= Pikrolimni =

Pikrolimni (Greek Πικρολίμνη 'bitter lake') may refer to:

- Pikrolimni (lake), a lake in Central Macedonia, Greece
- Pikrolimni (municipality), a former municipality, now a municipal unit, based around the lake
