= Neolepetopsis occulta =

Conservation status
- Least Concern (IUCN 3.1)

Scientific classification
- Kingdom: Animalia
- Phylum: Mollusca
- Class: Gastropoda
- Subclass: Patellogastropoda
- Family: Neolepetopsidae
- Genus: Neolepetopsis
- Species: N. occulta

Binomial name
- Neolepetopsis occulta McLean, 1990

Species of gastropod

Neolepetopsis occulta is a species of sea snail, a true limpet, a marine gastropod mollusk in the family Neolepetopsidae, one of the families of true limpets.

== Distribution ==
Green Seamount

== Habitat ==
hydrothermal vents
