= Paralepetopsis floridensis =

Scientific classification
- Kingdom: Animalia
- Phylum: Mollusca
- Class: Gastropoda
- Subclass: Patellogastropoda
- Family: Neolepetopsidae
- Genus: Paralepetopsis
- Species: P. floridensis

Binomial name
- Paralepetopsis floridensis McLean, 1990

Species of gastropod

Paralepetopsis floridensis is a species of sea snail, a true limpet, a marine gastropod mollusc in the family Neolepetopsidae, one of the families of true limpets.

Paralepetopsis floridensis is the type species in the genus Paralepetopsis.

== Distribution ==
West of the coast of Florida between continental slope and continental rise, at the base of continental slope

== Habitat ==
Cool, hypersaline and sulphide seeps
