= Pikrolimni (lake) =

Endorheic, alkaline salt lake in Kilkis prefecture, Greece

- Πικρολίμνη (Greek)
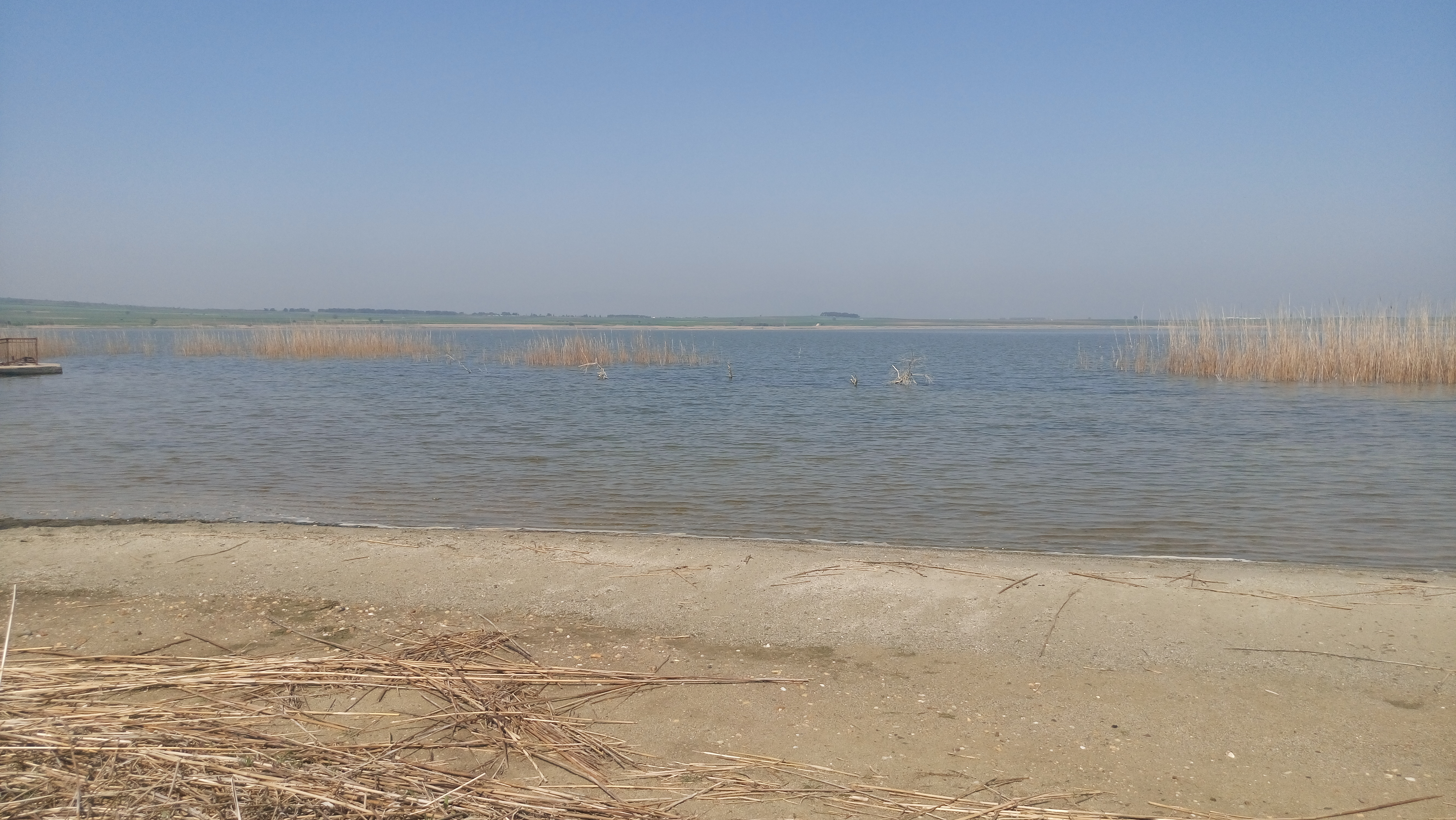
- View of lake Pikrolimni

- Location of Pikrolimni within Greece
- Location: Kilkis, Central Macedonia, Greece
- Coordinates: 40°50′05″N 22°48′46″E
- Type: hypersaline lake
- Etymology: "Bitter lake" (in Greek)
- Primary inflows: none (endorheic)
- Catchment area: 42.5 km^{2} (16.4 sq mi)
- Basin countries: Greece
- Designation: Natura 2000 protected area CORINE biotope
- Max. length: 2.4 km (1.5 mi)
- Max. width: 2.3 km (1.4 mi)
- Surface area: 3.7 km^{2} (1.4 sq mi) (average)
- Average depth: 0.7 m (2 ft 4 in)
- Max. depth: 1.5 m (4 ft 11 in)
- Salinity: 153‰
- Shore length^{1}: 8.5 km (5.3 mi)
- Surface elevation: 50 m (160 ft)
- Frozen: never
- Settlements: Nea Filadelfeia; Mikrokampos
- Website: Natura 2000 SDF
- ^{1} Shore length is not a well-defined measure.

Lake Pikrolimni (Greek: Πικρολίμνη 'bitter lake') is an endorheic, alkaline salt lake in Kilkis prefecture, Greece. It is located on the border of the Kilkis and Thessaloniki regional units, about 40 km northwest of Thessaloniki. The lake is hypersaline, has rather shallow waters (0.5–0.7 m) and a shoreline of about 8.5 km. The water surface area shows significant seasonal variation (3.2–4.5 km^{2}) due to evaporation in the summer months, with an average value of 3.7 km^{2}.

Pikrolimni is the only salt lake in Greece and constitutes a biotope with rare halophytic vegetation surrounded by common reeds, which is home to various common and endangered bird species. The habitat has been listed since 1996 as a Natura 2000 site of community interest and special protection area, while also protected by the Ramsar convention.

The lake was known in ancient times as Chalastra (Ancient Greek: Χαλάστρα), a famous source of natron and trona for Graeco-Roman glassmaking. In modern times it has been a site of pelo- and balneotherapy, with a spa specialising in such treatments using the lake's briny water and characteristic black mud.

== Location and origin ==
The lake is located about 40 km northwest of Thessaloniki and 25 km south of Kilkis, at the border between the former municipalities of Pikrolimni and Kallithea (now merged into Kilkis and Oraiokastro municipalities, respectively). The lake is surrounded by villages Nea Filadelfeia, Mikrokampos, the homonymous Pikrolimni, Xylokeratia and Mpakeika.

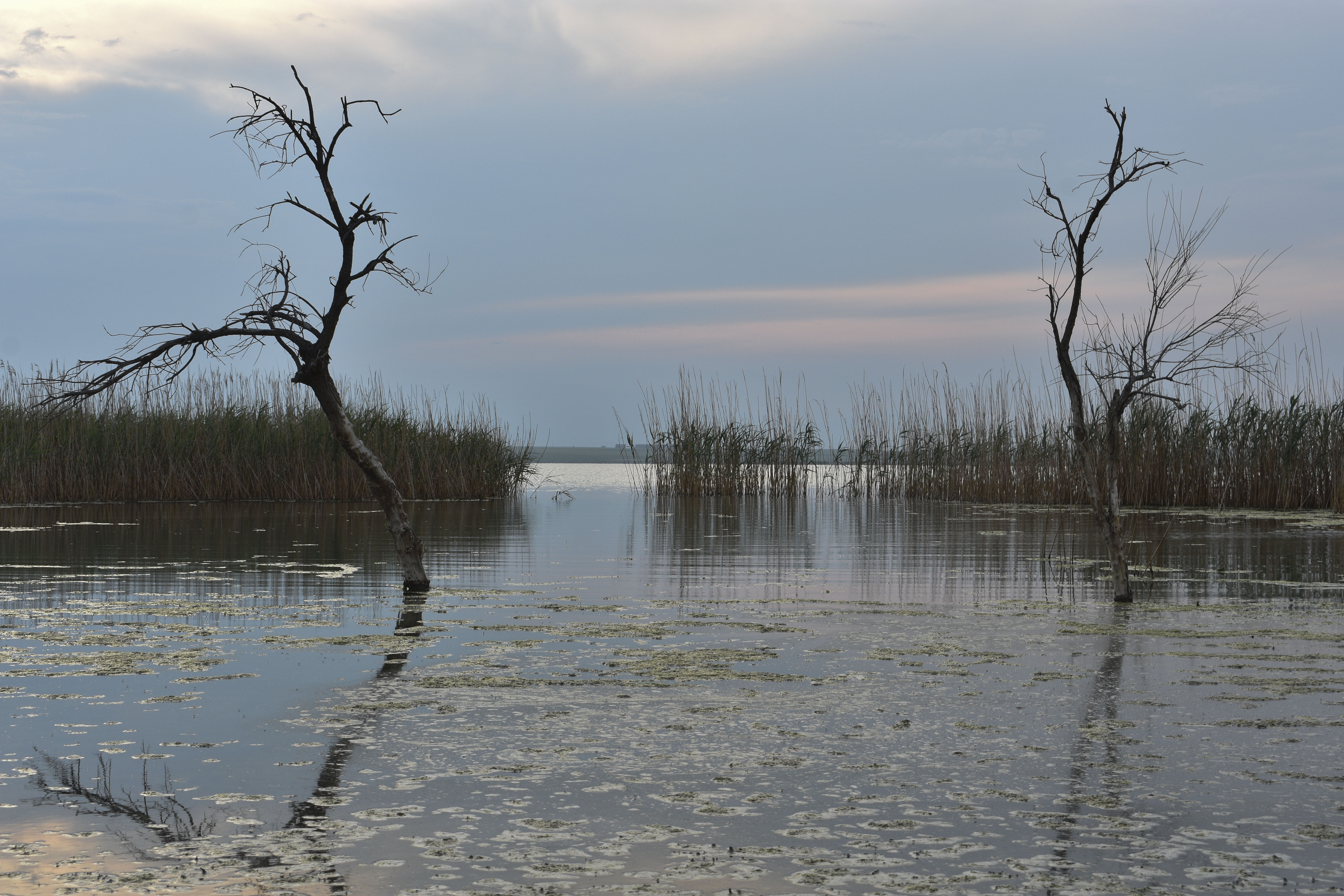
The flooded Pikrolimni lake as it appears during the winter months

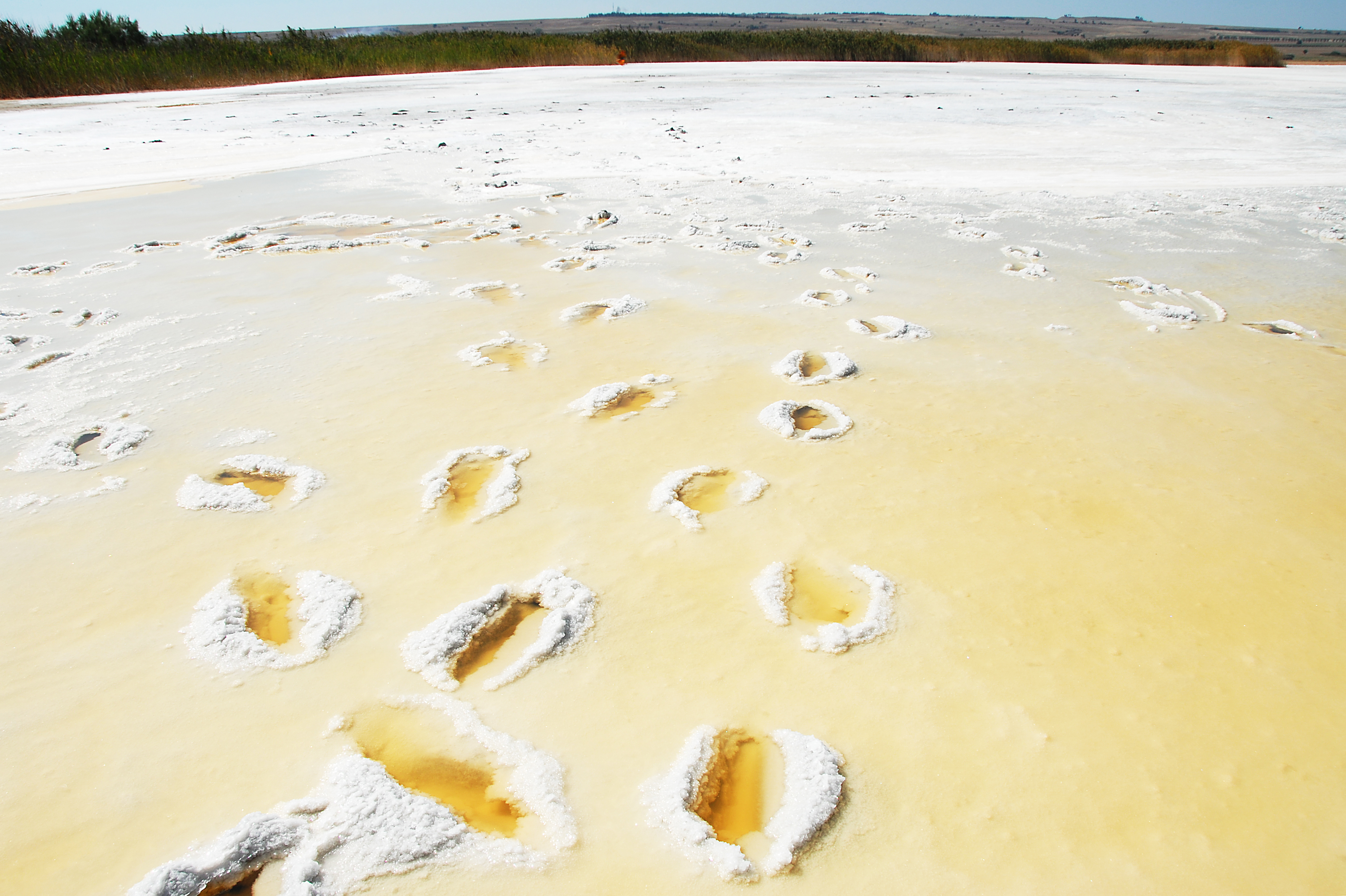
Outer parts of the lake (with salts from evaporation) dried during the summer

Multiple studies using hydrologic isotope analysis prove that the origin of the water in the lake is almost exclusively meteoric. This makes the lake truly endorheic and not cryptorheic, with the dominant process of water exchange being evaporation during the summer months followed by flooding from precipitation in the winter.

The cause of the famously high salinity of the lake is from the percolation and deep circulation of the shallow lake water in volcano-sedimentary rocks found in the region's underground, with mineral dissolution helped by the local hydrothermal gradient.

== History ==
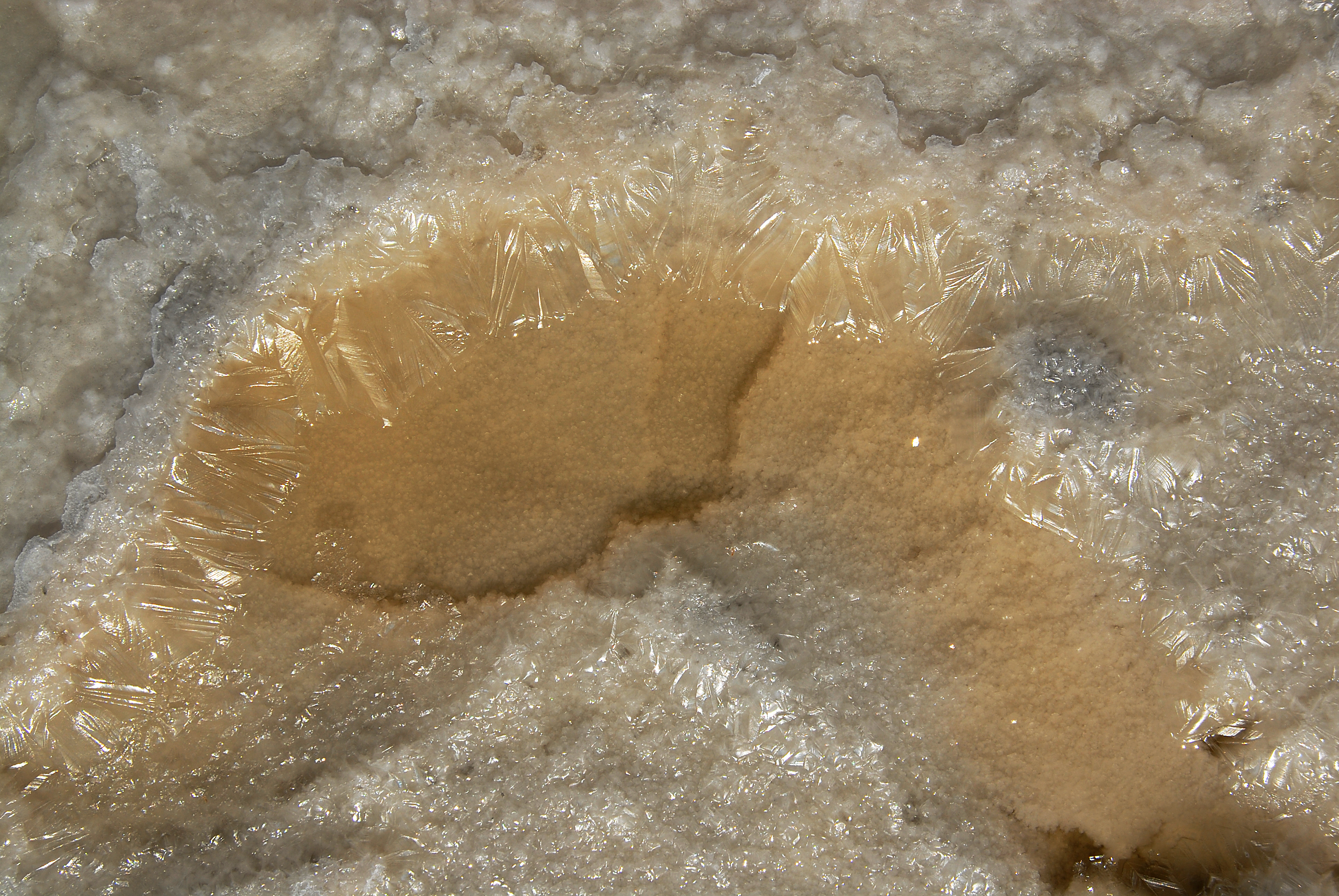
Natural evaporite formed in Pikrolimni, such as the ones used for the production of ancient chalestraion nitron.

Pikrolimni has been identified as the location of the ancient lake Chalastra based on archaeological finds in the vicinity and geochemical-hydrological evidence matching exactly with descriptions of the Macedonian lake by ancient authors such as Pliny the Elder.

From Chalastra the ancient Greeks extracted a type of natron specifically called chalestraion [nitron] (Ancient Greek: χαλεστραῖον [νίτρον], Latin: nitrum chalestricum) which was used extensively in Hellenistic and Roman times as a source of soda and flux in glassmaking. The processing of the lake's evaporites to yield the natron and trona mixture was done by the residents of the nearby ancient city of Clitae (Ancient Greek: Κλῖται), the ruins of which have been found in a small distance from Pikrolimni, near the modern village of Xylokeratia.

Chalestraion natron is first mentioned by Plato in the Republic (book 4, section 430a). Although the main source of natron in antiquity was Egypt's "valley of natron" (Wadi El Natrun), the rarer chalestraion nitron was praised, particularly by Pliny, as being of much higher quality and optical clarity.

Although it is hard to prove when natron extraction from Pikrolimni stopped, this can be assumed to be near the 9th century AD when plant ash replaced natron as the basic material for glassmaking in Europe and the Near East.

In recent years, as a result of a series of earthquakes in the 1960s and 1970s the lake shrunk by 150–200 m in length and width, but has been steadily growing towards its former size with each passing yearly evaporation-precipitation cycle. The most notable modern development around Pikrolimni is the creation of a spa hotel specialising in mud bath treatments (pelotherapy) on the southeast shore of the lake.

== Chemistry ==
The water of the lake is characterised as brine, with a very high average salinity of 153‰ (i.e. there are 153 g of salt per kg of lake water). In comparison, this is about five times the salinity of the Mediterranean Sea and half that of the Dead Sea. Of course, evaporation in the summer and flooding in the winter create significant variation of water volume (and hence salt concentration) throughout the year, with 153 g·kg^{−1} being only the average value.

The brine consists of a high proportion of sodium chloride and sulfate, as well as appreciable amounts of carbonates and bicarbonates which in addition to hypersaline, make the lake alkaline. The pH of the waters has a value around 9.3 (slightly higher than neutral pH 7 or seawater mean pH 8).

The pH, presence of species such as SO^{2−}_{4} and CO^{2−}_{3} along with the high chloride:bromide ratio make Pikrolimni's water consistency considerably different from marine water, reflecting its non-marine origin from meteoric waters with dissolved volcanic sediments.

Major ions in Pikrolimni waters and some major solids in Pikrolimni loam
Ion (aqueous)	Concentration in water (g/kg)	Solid (in loam)	Component of dry peloid (g/kg)
Cl^{−}	60.3	SiO_{2}	379
Na^{+}	56.4	Al_{2}O_{3}	161
SO^{2−}_{4}	26.9	NaCl	78
HCO^{−}_{3}	4.1	Fe_{2}O_{3}	65
CO^{2−}_{3}	4.1	Na_{2}CO_{3}	28
K^{+}	0.3	Na_{2}SO_{4}	25
Others	0.5	Others	264

The physical and chemical properties of the black mud at the bottom of the lake have been also studied due to its application as a peloid. The solid (dry) component is classified as sandy loam, containing on average 71% sand, 24% silt and 5% clay. Chemically, the main component is silica, with additional major contributions from alumina, sodium chloride, iron(III) oxide, sulfate and carbonate salts. These are found as minerals like quartz, clay minerals (mainly kaolinite with some montmorillonite and illite), halite, thenardite, burkeite, calcite, muscovite and albite.

== Pelotherapy ==
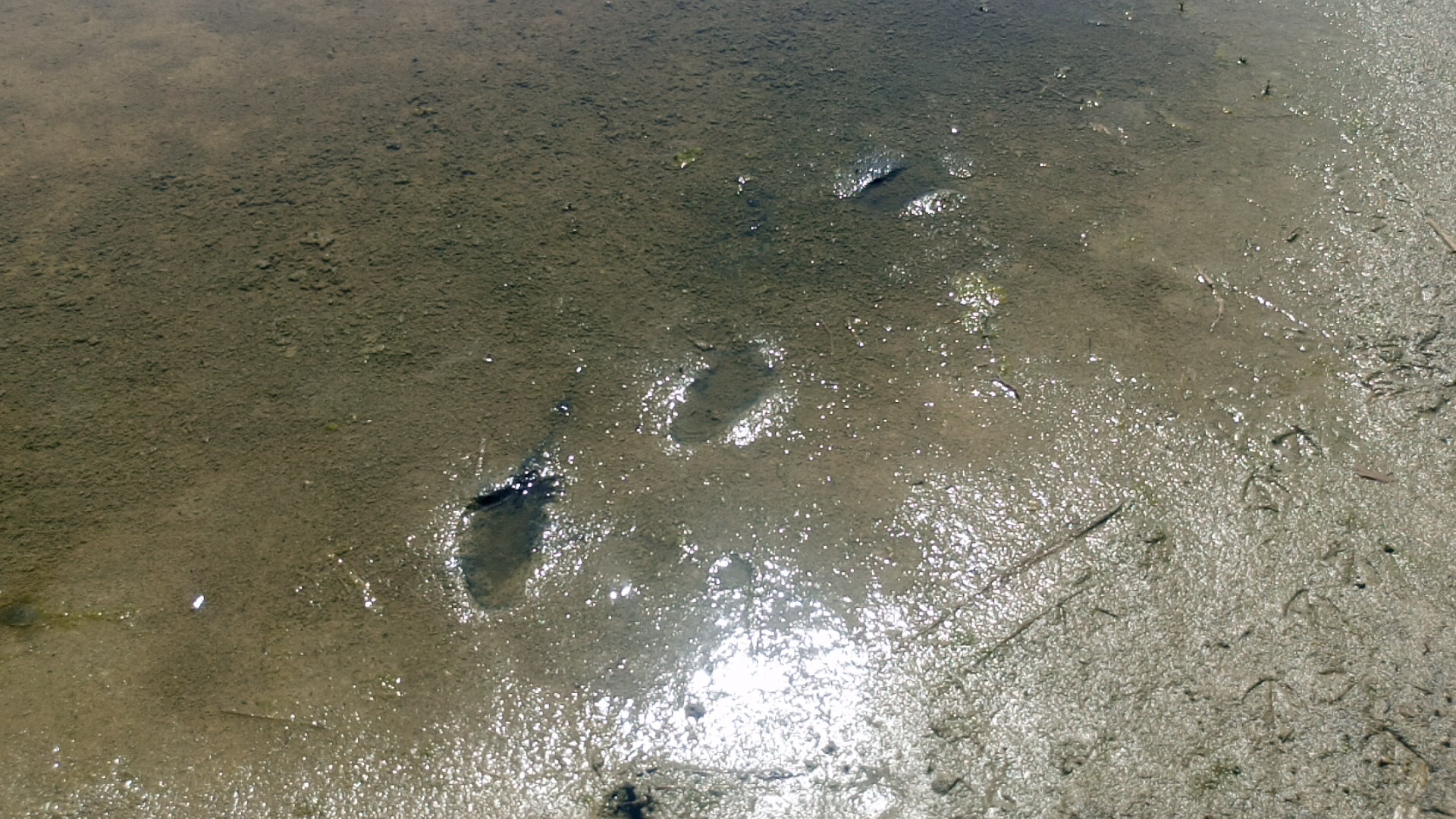
The black mud of Pikrolimni used in pelotherapy (seen with footprints of local wildlife)

In addition to the lake's saline water being used in balneotherapy, the black mud found on the lake's north shore has been promoted as a peloid (therapeutic mud) for use in pelotherapy (mud therapy). Pelotherapy can have medical or cosmetic purposes; a mixture of the peloid with lake brine is claimed to possess a beneficial effect on certain pathologies, skin appearance and to a lesser extent overall health when applied in a bath or as a cataplasm.

Specifically for peloids derived from Pikrolimni, their grain coarseness requires a sieving process before application, and their dark colour originates from the surface interaction of amorphous clay minerals with organic matter. Additionally, the concentration of potentially toxic through skin absorption elements Cr, Ni, Cu, Zn, Cd, As and Pb has been examined to determine the suitability of the lake's muds as safe peloid treatments; they all lie within normal ranges except for As and Pb, which are found slightly enriched but comparable to other therapeutic muds and judged to be of "no significant concern".

== Ecological habitat ==
The hypersaline lake itself, its muddy shore and the surrounding vibrantly vegetated endorrheic basin comprise an important habitat for the local flora and fauna of Pikrolimni, a protected Ramsar wetland which is also a designated Corine biotope and since 1996 Natura 2000 site of community interest (for flora) and special protection area (for avians).

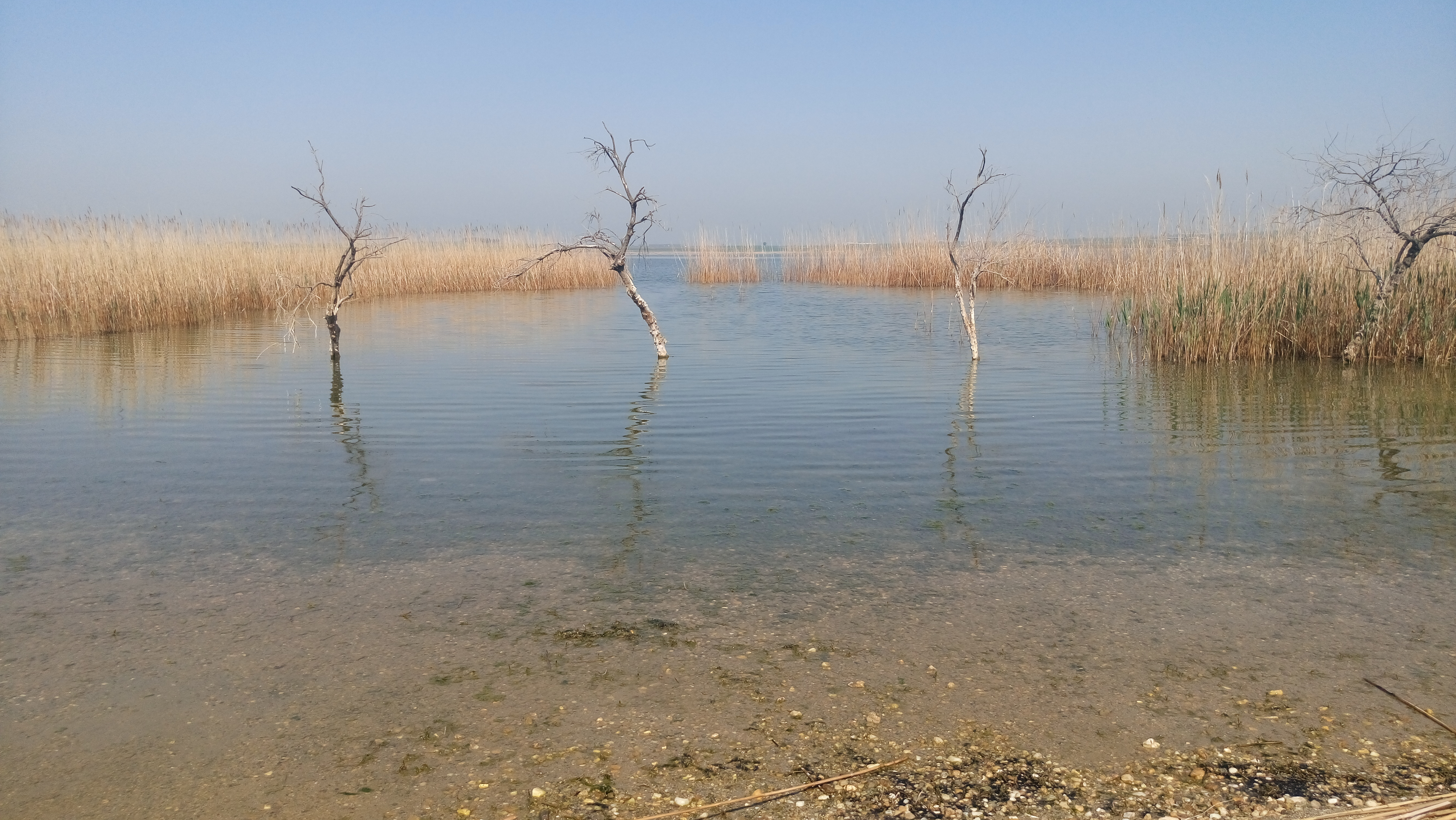
Common reeds and halophilic vegetation in Pikrolimni

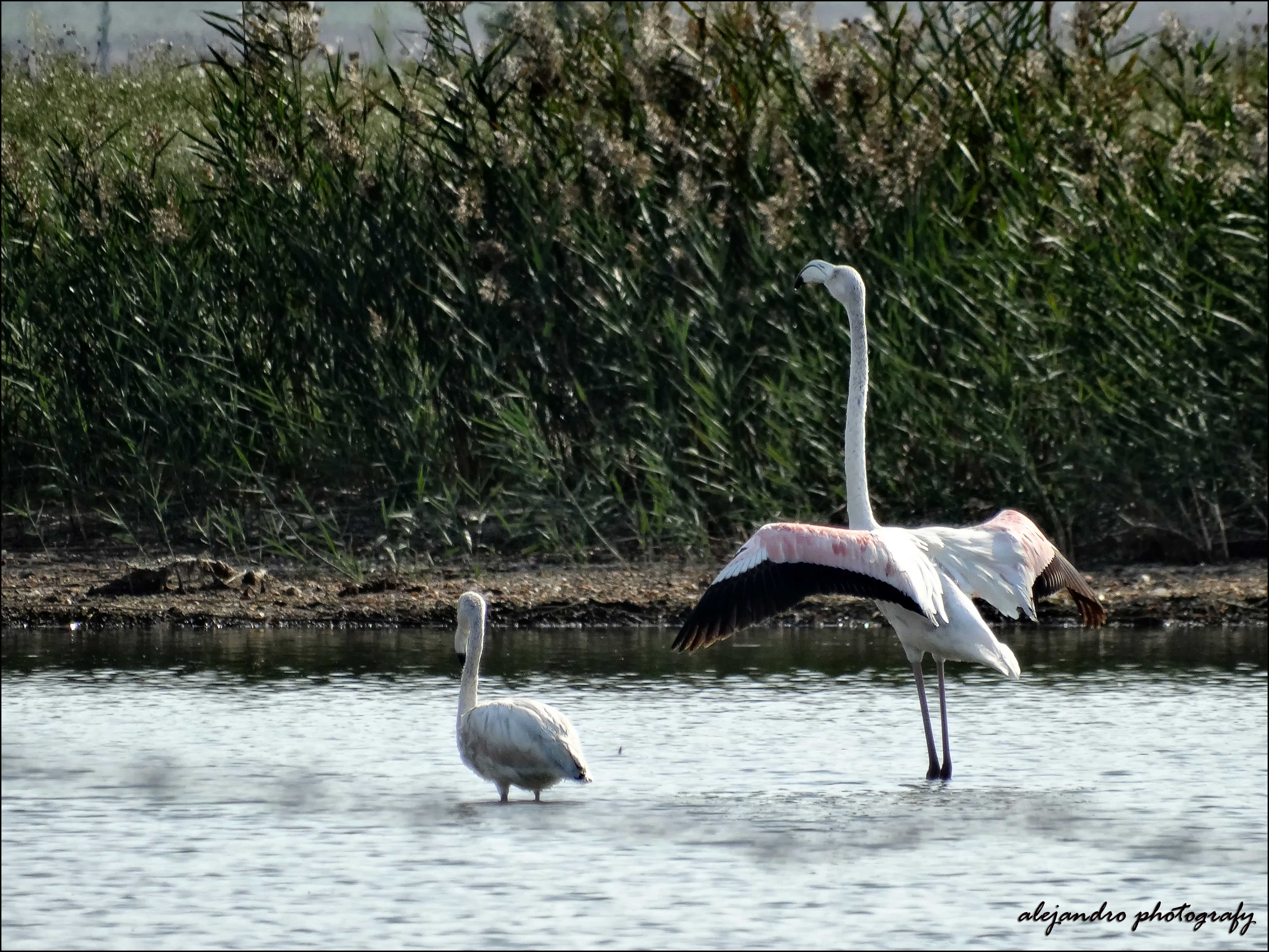
A pair of flamingos near the lake shore

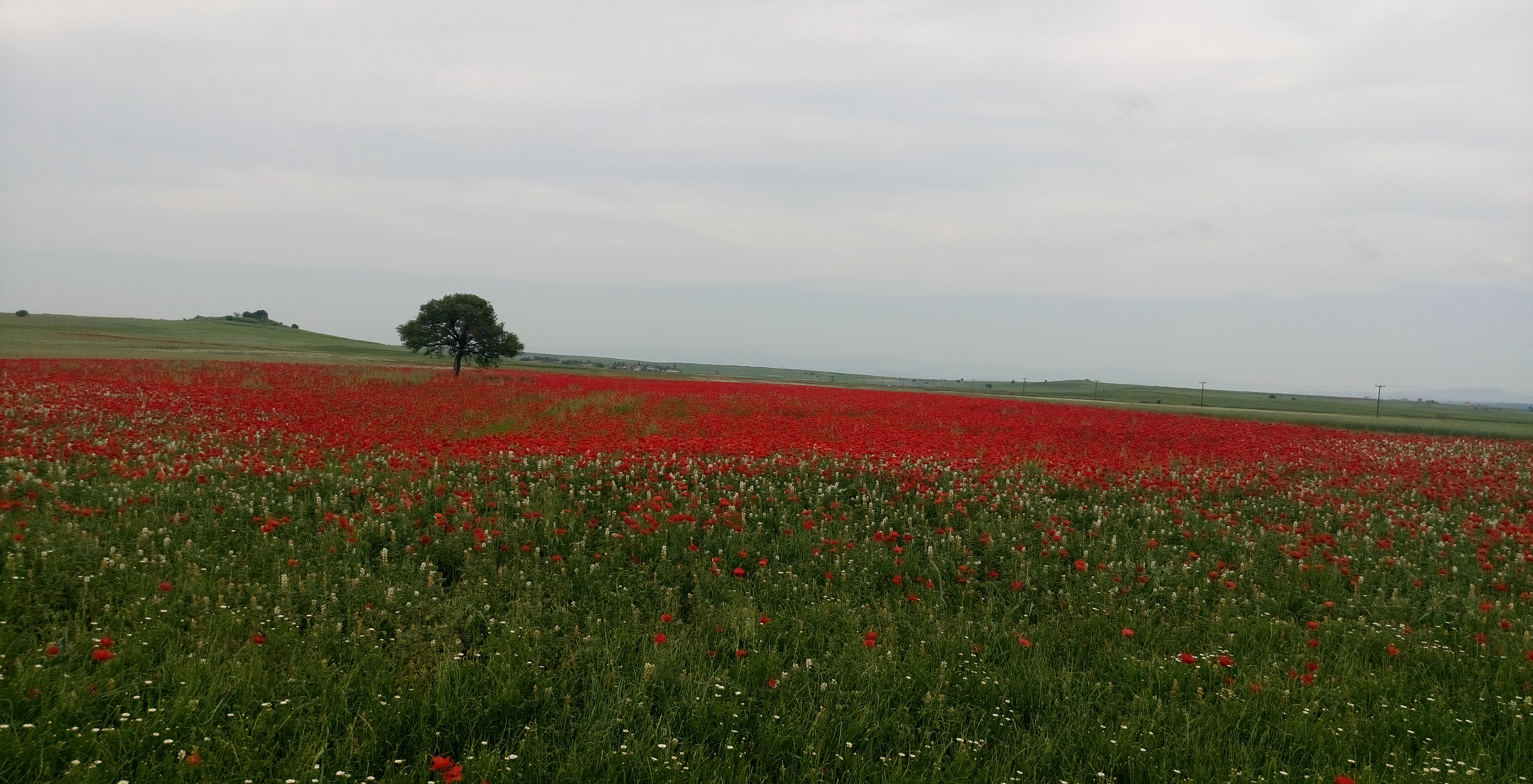
A field of poppies within the lake's endorheic basin

With respect to vegetation, the halophytes of the lake are both unusual and characteristic as the very different chemical composition of the water necessitates the differentiation from coastal halophytic growth. The most notable halophytes of Pikrolimni are the alkali grass (Puccinellia convoluta), pricklegrass (Crypsis aculeata), herbaceous seablite (Suaeda maritima), (Camphorosma annua), buck's-horn plantain (Plantago coronopus), Siberian statice (Limonium gmelinii), sandspurry (Spergularia nicaeensis) and tall wheatgrass (Elymus elongatus). These are accompanied by scattered reed bed formations of the common reed (Phragmites australis).

Regarding fauna, Pikrolimni is an important site for the breeding, passage and wintering of waterbirds as well as raptors, with more than 47 bird species listed in the Natura 2000 special protection area's data form. Some representative avians that can be found in the lake biotope include the greater flamingo (Phoenicopterus roseus) in large flocks, Dalmatian pelican (Pelecanus crispus), great crested grebe (Podiceps cristatus), Eurasian curlew (Numenius arquata), little grebe (Tachybaptus ruficollis), merlin (Falco columbarius) and short-toed snake eagle (Circaetus gallicus). Animals other than birds which can be found around the lake include reptiles, i.e. multiple species of toads, treefrogs and water snakes, or mammals such as the red fox (Vulpes vulpes), common weasel (Mustela nivalis) and even the endangered European ground squirrel (Spermophilus citellus).

== See also ==
- Hypersaline lake, the lake classification in which Pikrolimni belongs
- Lake Natron, a famous source of natron in modern times
- List of bodies of water by salinity
