= Green Sea =

Green Sea may refer to:

- Green Sea, South Carolina, U.S.
  - Green Sea Airport
- Operation Green Sea, an amphibious attack on Guinea in 1970

== See also ==
- Sea of green (disambiguation)
- Greenland Sea
- Green Seamount
- Codium fragile, or green sea fingers
- Zoanthus sociatus, or green sea mat
