= List of bodies of water by salinity =

This is a list of bodies of water by salinity that is limited to natural bodies of water that have a stable salinity above 0.05%, at or below which water is considered fresh.

Water salinity often varies by location and season, particularly with hypersaline lakes in arid areas, so the salinity figures in the table below should be interpreted as an approximate indicator.

Salinity, g/100 g (%)	Name	Type	Region or countries	Refs
20.0–50.0	Lake Elton	salt lake	Volgograd Oblast, Russia	
43.3	Gaet'ale Pond	salt lake	Ethiopia	
40.0	Don Juan Pond	salt lake	Antarctica	
40.0	Lake Retba	salt lake	Senegal	
35.0	Garabogazköl	lagoon	Turkmenistan	
34.8	Lake Assal	salt lake	Djibouti	
33.7	Dead Sea	salt lake	Israel, Jordan, Palestine	
32.4	Lake Tuz (Tuz Gölü)	salt lake	Turkey	
31.7	Great Salt Lake, North Arm	salt lake	Great Basin, Utah, United States	
30.0	Lake Baskunchak	salt lake	Astrakhan Oblast, Russia	
30.0	Lake Sărat	salt lake	Brăila, Romania	
8.50–28.0	Lake Urmia	salt lake	Iran	
27.0	Deep Lake	salt lake	Antarctica	
18.0	Little Manitou Lake	salt lake	Canada	
15.3	Lake Pikrolimni	salt lake	Greece	
0.00–14.6	Lake Vanda	meromictic lake	Antarctica	
14.2	Great Salt Lake, South Arm	salt lake	Great Basin, Utah, United States	
12.0	Lake Abert	salt lake	Great Basin, Oregon, United States	
9.50	Lake Techirghiol	salt lake	Romania	
8.80	Mono Lake	salt lake	Great Basin, California, United States	(as of 2015)
3.8-7.1	Lake Bardawil	lagoon	North Sinai Governorate, Egypt	
6.60	Hamelin Pool	lagoon	Australia	
4.40	Salton Sea	salt lake	Great Basin, California, United States	
4.10–4.50	Great Bitter Lake	salt lake	Egypt	
3.80	Mediterranean Sea	mediterranean sea	Southern Europe, Levant, North Africa	
3.60–4.10	Red Sea	mediterranean sea	Egypt, Sudan, Arabian Peninsula, Horn of Africa	
3.00–4.00	Lake Natron	salt lake	Tanzania	
3.40–3.60	World Ocean	ocean	Worldwide	
3.50+	Lake Eyre	endorheic lake	Australia	(Note: When full, Lake Eyre salinity is the same as oceans; due to a 45cm thick salt layer when dry, it rises as water evaporates.)
3.40	Lough Hyne	marine lake	Republic of Ireland	
2.80–3.20	Beaufort Sea	marginal sea	North of Alaska and Canada	
2.20	Sea of Marmara	mediterranean sea	Between the Balkan Peninsula and the Anatolian peninsula	
3.17	Chilika Lake	lagoon	India	
1.30–2.30	Black Sea	mediterranean sea	Between Europe and Asia - Balkan Peninsula, Eastern Europe, Anatolia, Caucasus	
2.30	Lake Van	salt lake	Turkey	
1.40	Qinghai Lake	salt lake	China	
1.25	Caspian Sea	salt lake	Eastern Europe/ Western Asia	
1.14	Sarygamysh Lake	salt lake	Turkmenistan, Uzbekistan	
1.00–1.20	Sea of Azov	mediterranean sea	Ukraine, Russia	
0.8–1.0	Baltic Sea	marginal sea	Northern Europe	(Note: Some bays have considerably lower salinity.)
0.59	Issyk Kul	salt lake	Kyrgyzstan, Central Asia	(Note: Deeper water areas of lake Issyk Kul have higher salinity)

== See also ==
- List of brackish bodies of water

== Bibliography ==
- Johanna Laybourn-Parry; Jemma L. Wadham (2014). Antarctic Lakes. Oxford University Press. pp. 92–94. ISBN 978-0-19-967049-9.
