= Sea of green =

Sea of green may refer to:

- Sea of Green, a Canadian rock band
- Sea of green (SOG), a method of Cannabis cultivation
- "Sea of Green", a song by the Sword from the album Used Future

== See also ==
- Green Sea (disambiguation)
- "Yellow Submarine" (song), by the Beatles, produced in 1966
- Iranian Green Movement
