= Eulepetopsis =

Scientific classification
- Kingdom: Animalia
- Phylum: Mollusca
- Class: Gastropoda
- Subclass: Patellogastropoda
- Family: Neolepetopsidae
- Genus: Eulepetopsis; McLean, 1990

Genus of gastropods

Eulepetopsis is a genus of sea snails, the true limpets, marine gastropod mollusks in the family Neolepetopsidae.

== Species ==
Species within the genus Eulepetopsis include:

- Eulepetopsis crystallina C. Chen, Y.-D. Zhou, H. K. Watanabe, R. Y. Zhang & C. S. Wang, 2021
- Eulepetopsis vitrea McLean, 1990
