= Paralepetopsis clementensis =

Scientific classification
- Kingdom: Animalia
- Phylum: Mollusca
- Class: Gastropoda
- Subclass: Patellogastropoda
- Family: Neolepetopsidae
- Genus: Paralepetopsis
- Species: P. clementensis

Binomial name
- Paralepetopsis clementensis McLean, 2008

Species of gastropod

Paralepetopsis clementensis is a species of sea snail, a true limpet, a marine gastropod mollusc in the family Neolepetopsidae, one of the families of true limpets.

== Distribution ==
Northeastern Pacific Ocean

== Habitat ==
Whale bone
