= Neolepetopsis =

Scientific classification
- Kingdom: Animalia
- Phylum: Mollusca
- Class: Gastropoda
- Subclass: Patellogastropoda
- Family: Neolepetopsidae
- Genus: Neolepetopsis; McLean, 1990

Genus of gastropods

Neolepetopsis is a genus of sea snails, the true limpets, marine gastropod mollusks in the family Neolepetopsidae.

== Species ==
Species within the genus Neolepetopsis include:

- Neolepetopsis densata McLean, 1990
- Neolepetopsis gordensis McLean, 1990
- Neolepetopsis nicolasensis McLean, 2008
- Neolepetopsis occulta McLean, 1990
- Neolepetopsis verruca McLean, 1990
