= List of brackish bodies of water =

Bodies of water of brackish nature are found around the world in a wide variety of settings, shapes and sizes. The following is a list of notable bodies of brackish water.

== Brackish seas ==
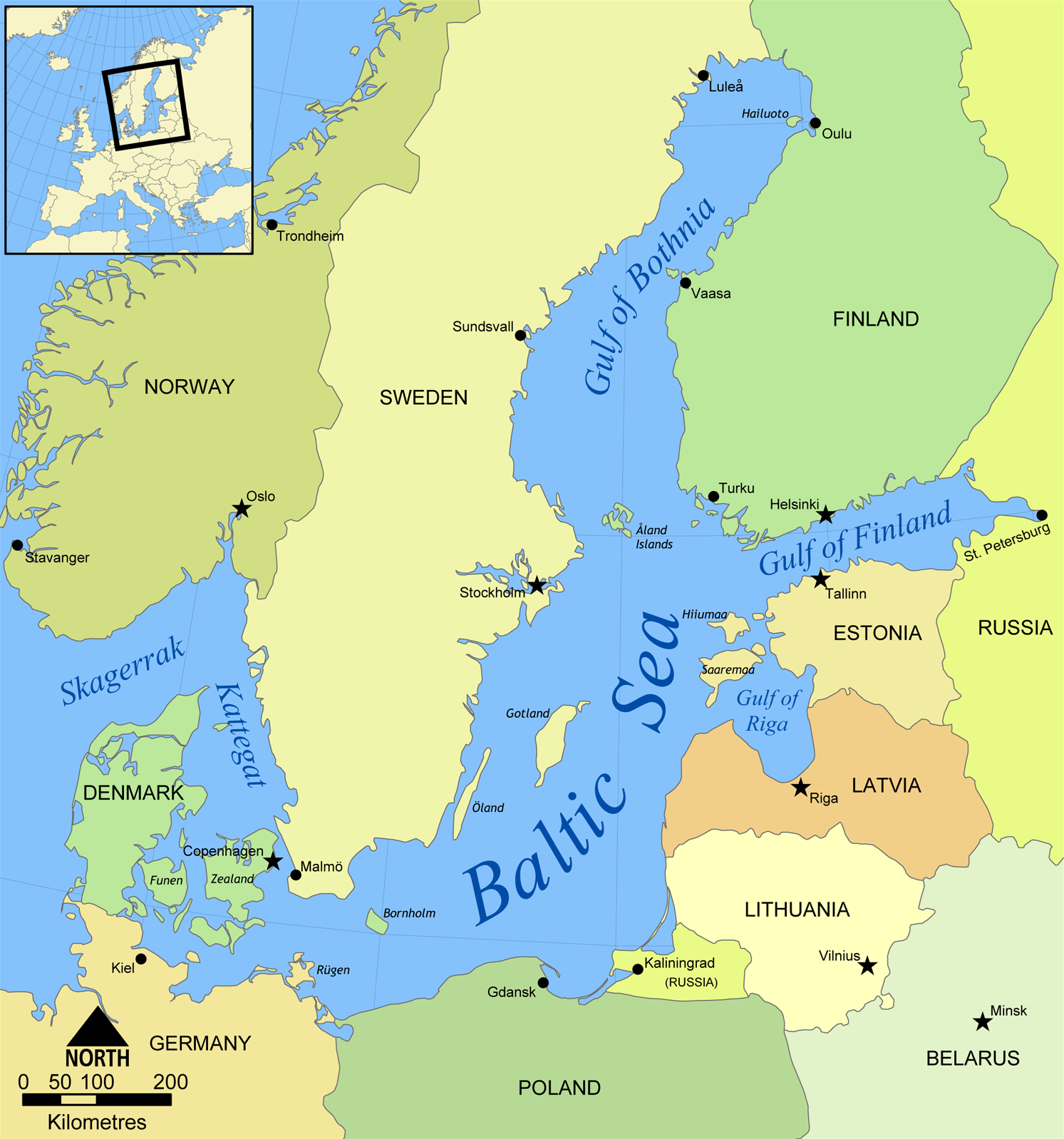
Map of the Baltic Sea

- Baltic Sea (the world’s largest inland brackish sea)
- Black Sea
- Hudson Bay and James Bay
- Salish Sea
- Ariake Sea

== Brackish lakes ==
=== Africa ===
- Lake Turkana in Kenya and Ethiopia

=== Americas ===
- Laguna de Oviedo in the Dominican Republic
- Lake Manitoba in Manitoba, Canada
- Lake Monroe in Florida, United States
- Lake Titicaca, in the Andes on the border between Bolivia and Peru
- Lake Texoma, on the border between Oklahoma and Texas, United States

=== Asia ===
- Caspian Sea
- Issyk Kul in Kyrgyzstan
- Pangong Tso Ladakh, India
- Lake Van, in eastern Turkey

=== Europe ===
- Loch of Stenness in Scotland
- Lake Mogil'noe on Kildin Island, north of Murmansk, Russia
- Lake Vouliagmeni located south of Athens, Vouliagmeni, Greece

== Tidal lagoons, marshes, and deltas ==
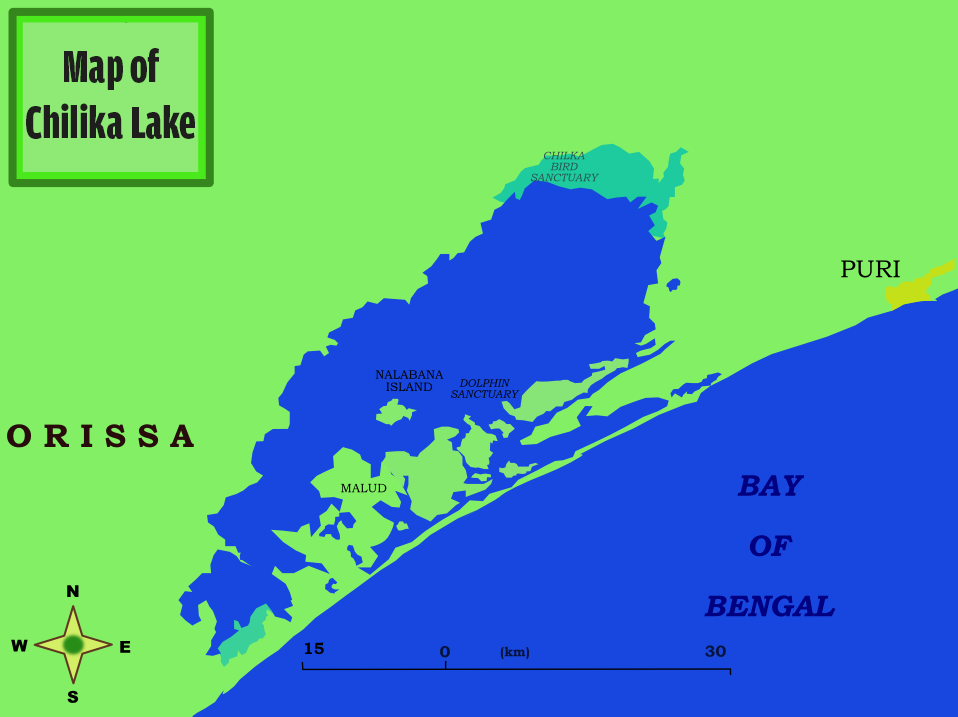
Map of Lake Chilka, India's largest lake, classified as a brackish water body

=== Africa ===
- Lagos Lagoon in Lagos, Nigeria
- Lake Burullus in the Nile Delta, Egypt

=== Americas ===
- Barnegat Bay in New Jersey, United States
- Bras d'Or Lake on Cape Breton Island in Nova Scotia, Canada
- Budi Lake in Araucanía, Chile
- Indian River Lagoon in Florida, United States
- Lake Maracaibo in Zulia State, Venezuela
- Lagoa dos Patos in Rio Grande do Sul state, Brazil
- Laguna de Términos in Campeche, Mexico
- Lake Pontchartrain in Louisiana, United States
- Simpson Bay Lagoon on the island of Saint Martin
- Rodeo Lagoon in Marin County, California

=== Asia ===
- Chilika Lake in Odisha, India
- Kaliveli Lake in Tamil Nadu, India
- The Kerala Backwaters, a series of lagoons and lakes in Kerala, India
- Muthupet Lagoon in Tamil Nadu, India
- Pulicat Lake in Andhra Pradesh, India
- The Rann of Kutch between Gujarat, India and Sindh, Pakistan
- Lake Shinji in Japan
- Lake Hamana in Japan
- Lake Saroma in Japan

=== Europe ===
- The Burgas Lakes near the Bulgarian Black Sea Coast
- The Fleet lagoon in Dorset, England
- Loch Etive in Scotland
- Loch Long in Scotland
- Parts of the Rhône Delta, France: an area known as the Camargue
- Widewater, a land-locked lagoon near Lancing, England

=== Oceania ===
- Kiritimati Lagoon in Kiribati
- Lake Ellesmere / Te Waihora in Canterbury, New Zealand

== Estuaries ==
- Amazon River, empties so much freshwater into the Atlantic Ocean that it reduces the salinity of the sea for hundreds of kilometres
- Chesapeake Bay in Maryland and Virginia. It is the drowned river valley of the Susquehanna River. It is the largest estuary in the United States.
- Delaware Bay, an extension of the Delaware River in New Jersey and Delaware, the United States
- Great Bay, an extension of the Piscataqua River in Portsmouth, New Hampshire, United States
- The Lower Hudson River in New York and New Jersey, the United States
- East River and Harlem River in New York, the United States
- Lingding Yang, Guangdong, China
- Lake Charles in Lake Charles, Louisiana, United States
- Lake Maurepas in Louisiana, United States
- Lake Pontchartrain in Louisiana, United States
- Miramichi River, New Brunswick, Canada
- Mobile Bay, Alabama, United States (also the only known place in the world where jubilees regularly occur [see Mobile Bay Jubilee])
- Port Royal Sound part of Beaufort County, South Carolina, United States, The Lowcountry Estuarium – Estuary, Marsh, & Creek Life – South Carolina Coast
- Ringkøbing Fjord in Midtjylland, Denmark
- Río de la Plata in Argentina and Uruguay.
- Saint Lawrence and Saguenay Rivers, the part downstream from Île d'Orléans and Saguenay respectively, Canada
- San Francisco Bay and San Pablo Bay adjacent to San Francisco in California, United States
- The Thames Estuary in South East England, United Kingdom
- The Tagus Estuary near Lisbon, Portugal
- The Reversing Falls of the Saint John River, Saint John, New Brunswick, Canada.

== See also ==
- List of bodies of water by salinity
