= Gaet'ale Pond =

Small lake in the Afar Region of Ethiopia

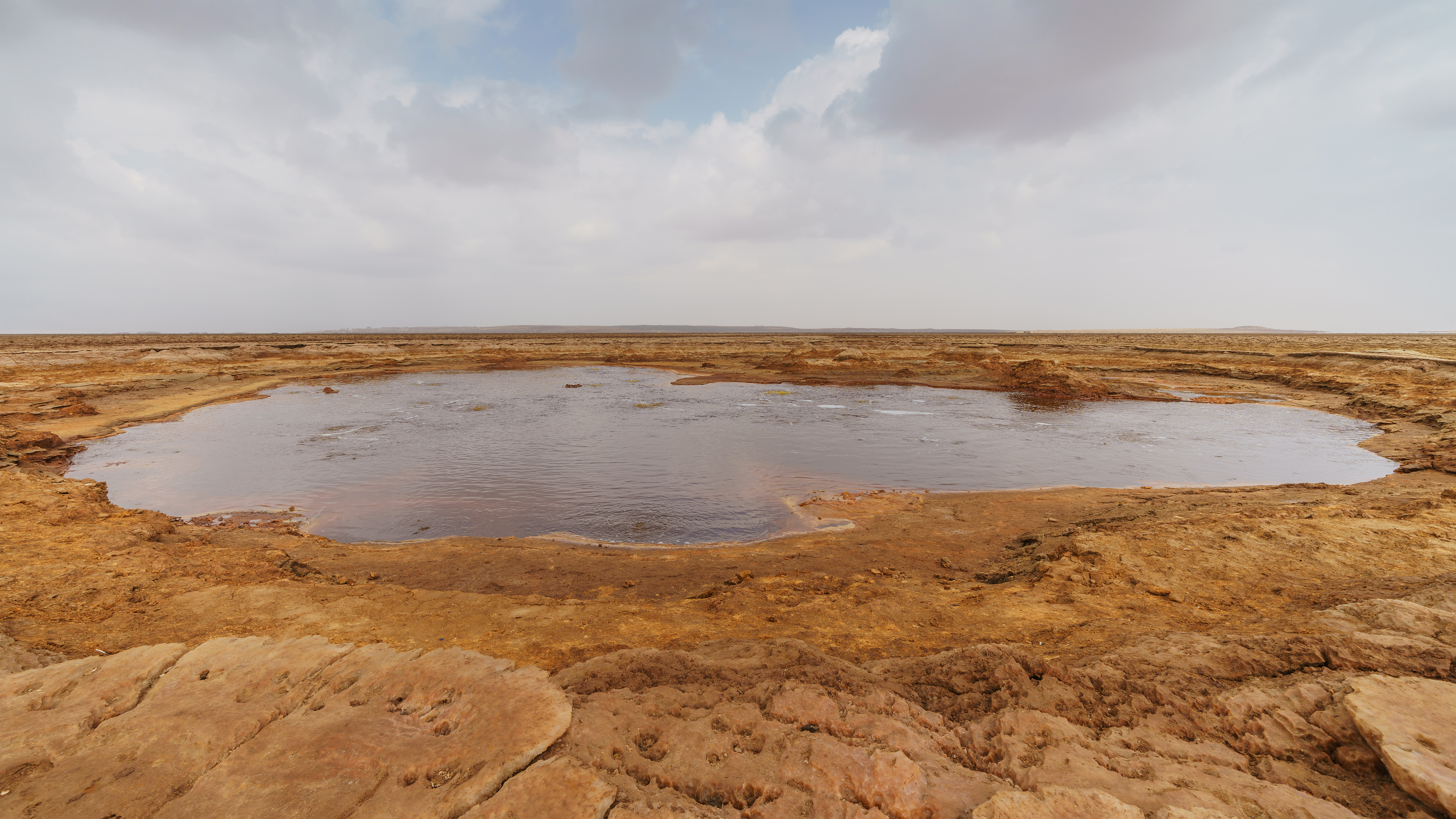
- General view

- Location within Ethiopia
- Location: Afar Region, Ethiopia
- Coordinates: 14°12′48″N 40°19′17″E
- Type: Hypersaline lake
- Primary outflows: None
- Max. length: 60 m (200 ft)
- Max. width: 40 m (130 ft)
- Salinity: 433 g/kg

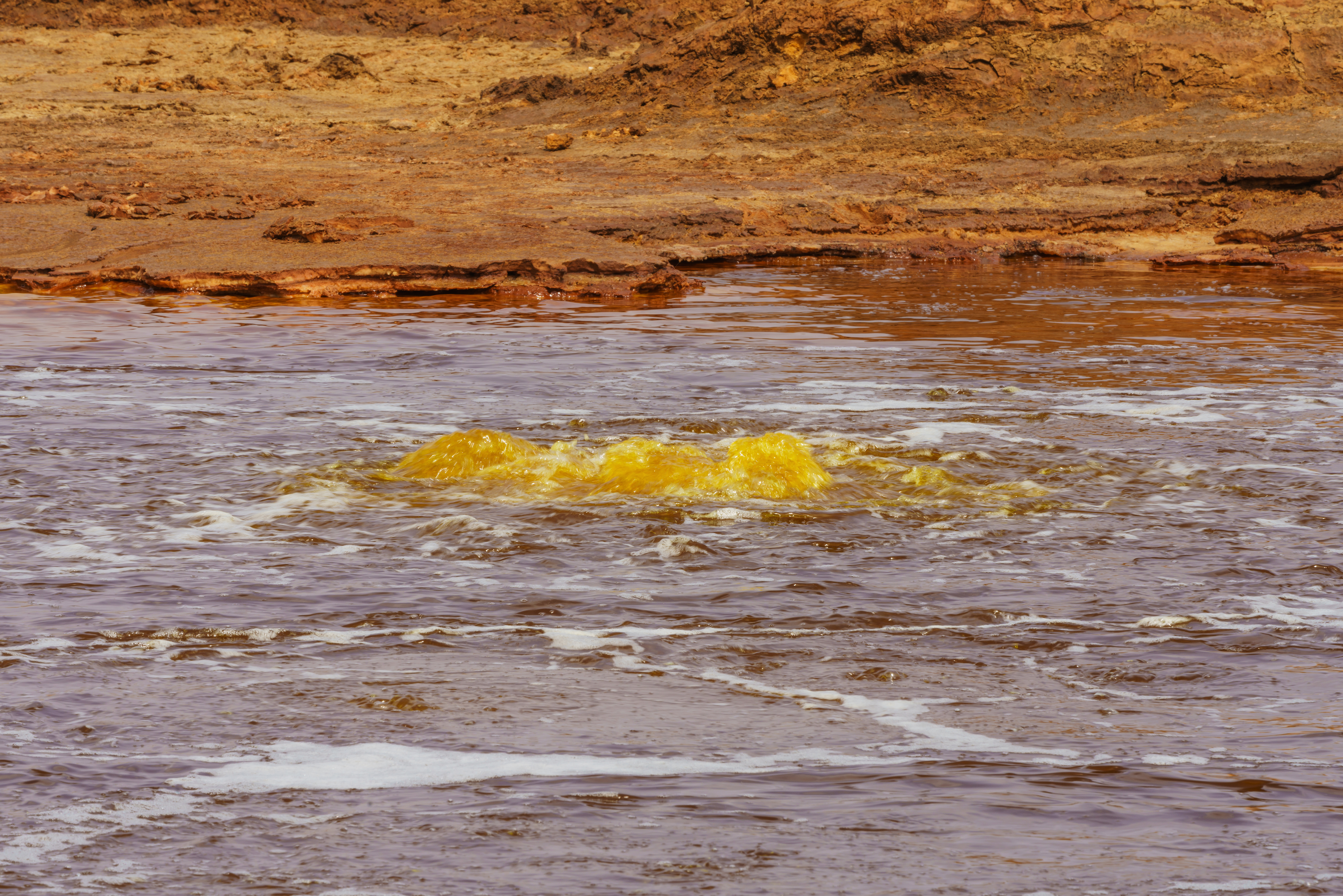
Hot spring in the pond

Gaet'ale Pond is a small hypersaline lake located near the Dallol crater in the Danakil Depression (Afar Region, Ethiopia). It is located over a hot spring of tectonic origin and has no apparent inlet or outlet streams. The water of Gaet'ale Pond has a salinity of 43%, making it the saltiest water body on Earth.

== Location and origin ==
Gaet'ale Pond is the largest of a series of small ponds located approximately 4 kilometres (2.5 mi) southeast of Dallol springs. It is crescent-shaped with a diameter of about 60 metres (200 ft).

According to residents of the nearby village of Ahmed'ela, an earthquake in January 2005 reactivated a thermal spring and the pond was created. For this reason, its temperature of 50–55 °C (122–131 °F) is hotter than the environment.

== Composition of the water ==
The salts in the water of Gaet'ale Pond are mainly composed by calcium chloride at 2.72 mol/kg and magnesium chloride at 1.43 mol/kg. It also contains small amounts of Na^{+}, K^{+} and NO^{−}_{2} ions. The total amount of dissolved solids content is 433 g/kg, or 43.3%. It also contains traces of iron(III) that form a complex with chloride, giving the water a characteristic yellow color.

Bubbles of odorless gas are emitted from the lake surface. It is likely volcanically-produced carbon dioxide. Bird and insect corpses have been found around the pond, and it has been proposed that the gas may be harmful for small animals or humans.
