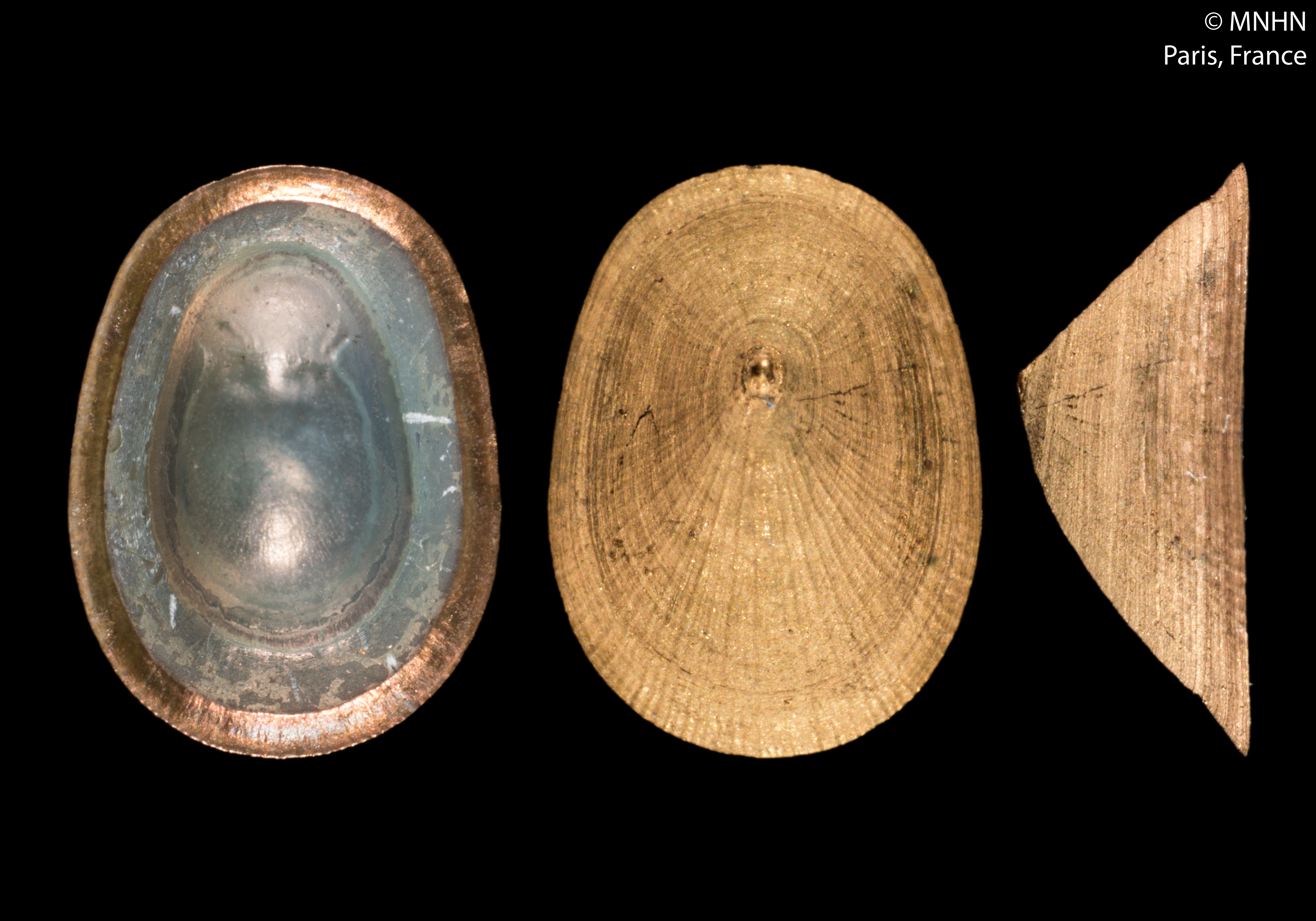
- Shell of Paralepetopsis ferrugivora (holotype at MNHN, Paris)

Scientific classification
- Kingdom: Animalia
- Phylum: Mollusca
- Class: Gastropoda
- Subclass: Patellogastropoda
- Superfamily: Lottioidea
- Family: Neolepetopsidae
- Genus: Paralepetopsis; McLean, 1990

Type species
- Paralepetopsis floridensis J. H. McLean, 1990

= Paralepetopsis =

Genus of gastropods

Paralepetopsis is a genus of sea snails, the true limpets, marine gastropod mollusks in the family Neolepetopsidae.

== Species ==
Species within the genus Paralepetopsis include:

- Paralepetopsis clementensis McLean, 2008
- Paralepetopsis ferrugivora Warén & Bouchet, 2001
- Paralepetopsis floridensis McLean, 1990
- Paralepetopsis lepichoni Warén & Bouchet, 2001
- Paralepetopsis rosemariae Beck, 1996
- Paralepetopsis sasakii Warén & Bouchet, 2009
- Paralepetopsis tunnicliffae McLean, 2008
