= Clitae (Macedonia) =

Town of ancient Macedonia

Coordinates: 40°51′38″N 22°48′50″E

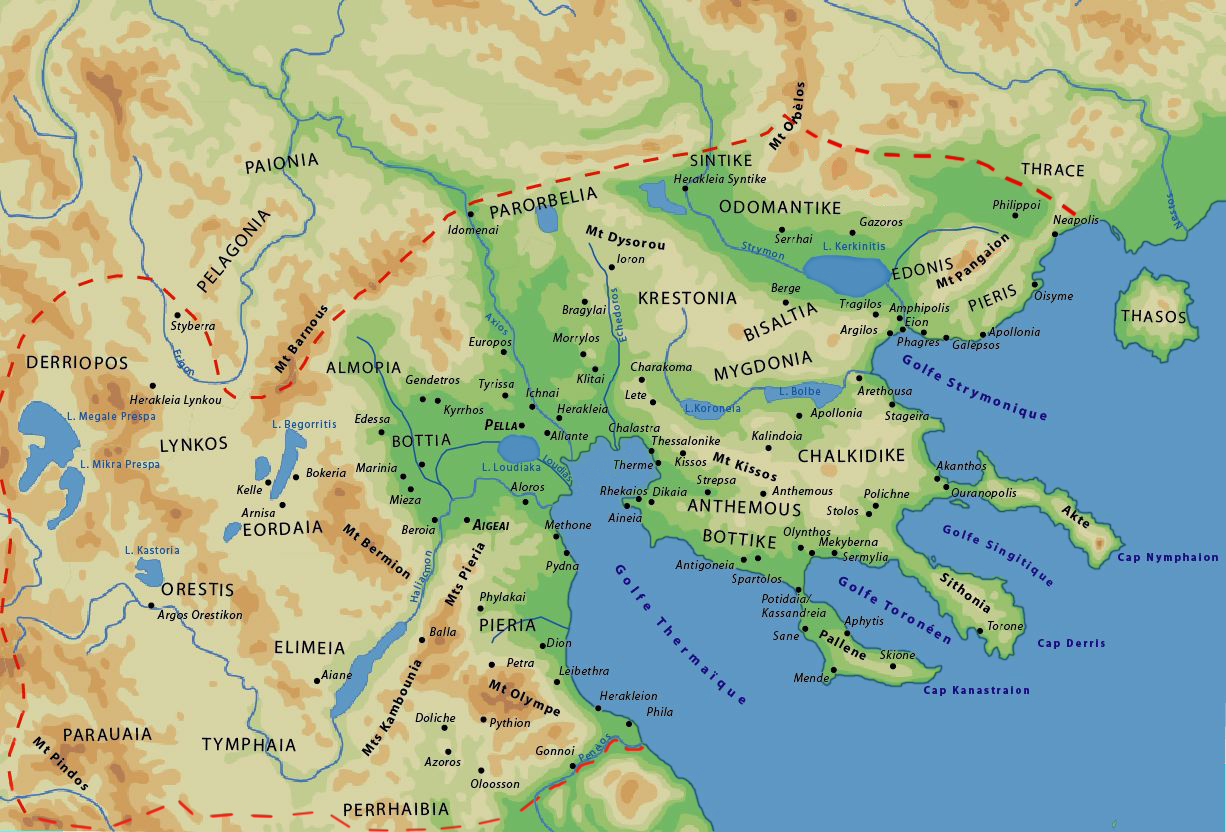
Macedonia and the Chalcidice

Clitae or Klitai (Ancient Greek: Κλῖται) was a town of ancient Macedonia, the site of the Roman breakthrough of the Macedonian line during the Roman conquest of Macedonia. Some have identified the town as the Chaetae (Χαῖται) – "Κλ" being mistaken for "Χα" – in Ptolemy.

In the Delphic Theorodochoi inscription (230 BC), published by André Plassart, there is a mention of a man who was named Phaneas Solonos (Ancient Greek: Φανέας Σόλωνος) from Clitae.

Clitae is mentioned by Pliny the Elder as a centre of natron production from the ancient lake Chalastra (Ancient Greek: Χαλάστρα), which is identified as the salt lake now known as Pikrolimni. The chalestraion nitron (Ancient Greek: χαλεστραῖον [νίτρον]) produced in Clitae and used in Graeco-Roman glassmaking is mentioned by Plato in the Republic (430a) and praised for its high quality by Pliny.

Combined with the identification of lake Chalastra with Pikrolimni and glassware found in the vicinity, the ruins of Clitae are considered to lie in a site near the modern village Xylokeratia of Kilkis prefecture, Greece.
