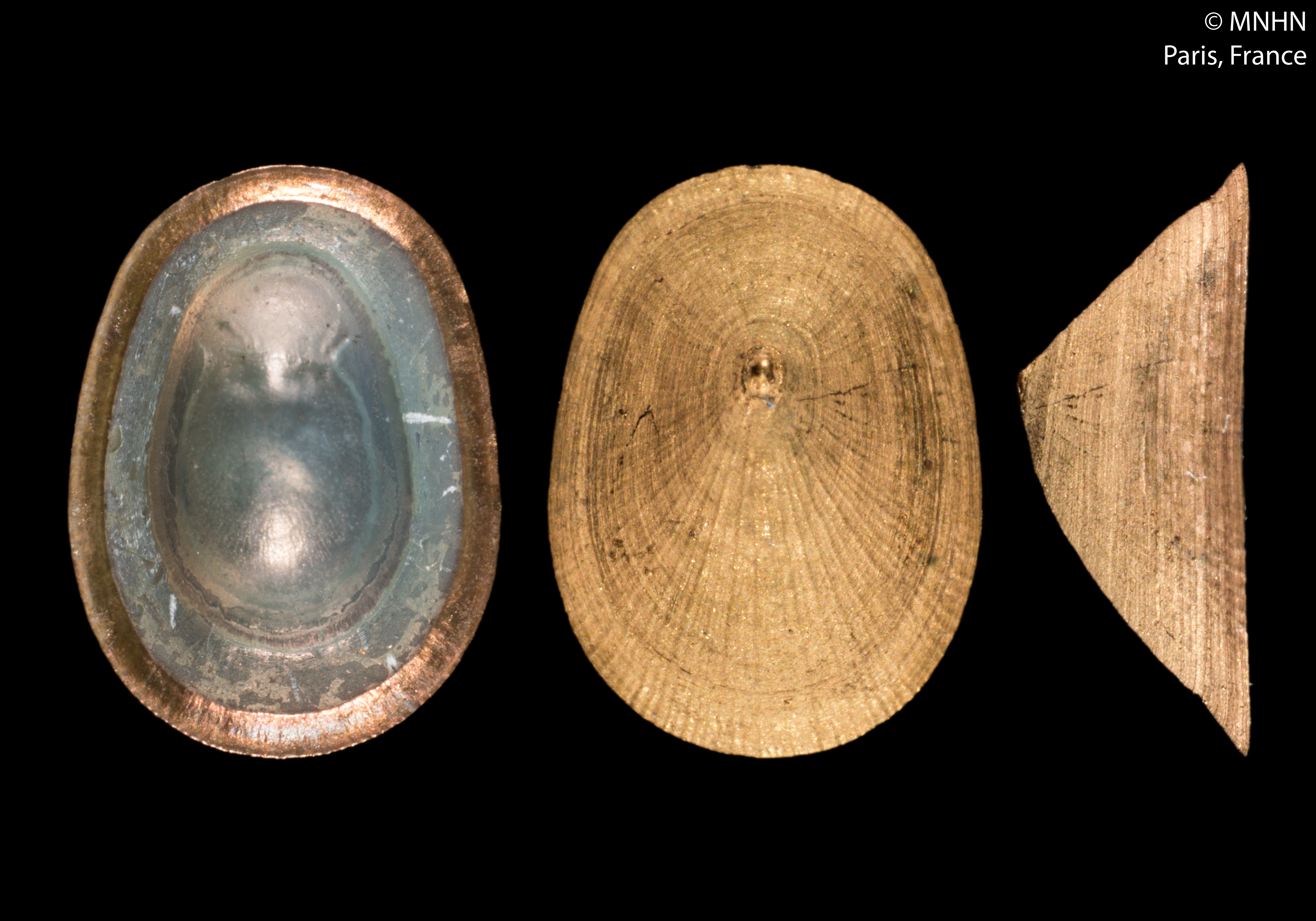
- Shell of Paralepetopsis ferrugivora (holotype at MNHN, Paris)

Conservation status
- Near Threatened (IUCN 3.1)

Scientific classification
- Kingdom: Animalia
- Phylum: Mollusca
- Class: Gastropoda
- Subclass: Patellogastropoda
- Family: Neolepetopsidae
- Genus: Paralepetopsis
- Species: P. ferrugivora

Binomial name
- Paralepetopsis ferrugivora Warén & Bouchet, 2001

= Paralepetopsis ferrugivora =

Species of gastropod

Paralepetopsis ferrugivora is a species of sea snail, a true limpet, a marine gastropod mollusc in the family Neolepetopsidae, one of the families of true limpets.

== Description ==
The largest reported specimen was 9.2 mm in diameter.

== Habitat ==
The species is normally found in deep-sea hydrothermal vents and seeps. They have been found in the Mid-Atlantic Ridge. They can survive in water from 2.52–4.96 degrees Celsius, and at depths from 1,620–3,500 feet (490–1,070 m).
