= Paralepetopsis tunnicliffae =

Conservation status
- Vulnerable (IUCN 3.1)

Scientific classification
- Kingdom: Animalia
- Phylum: Mollusca
- Class: Gastropoda
- Subclass: Patellogastropoda
- Family: Neolepetopsidae
- Genus: Paralepetopsis
- Species: P. tunnicliffae

Binomial name
- Paralepetopsis tunnicliffae McLean, 2008

Species of gastropod

Paralepetopsis tunnicliffae is a species of sea snail, a true limpet, a marine gastropod mollusc in the family Neolepetopsidae, one of the families of true limpets.

== Distribution ==
Northeastern Pacific Ocean

== Habitat ==
Hydrothermal vents
