= Lake Elton =

Lake Elton Эльтон
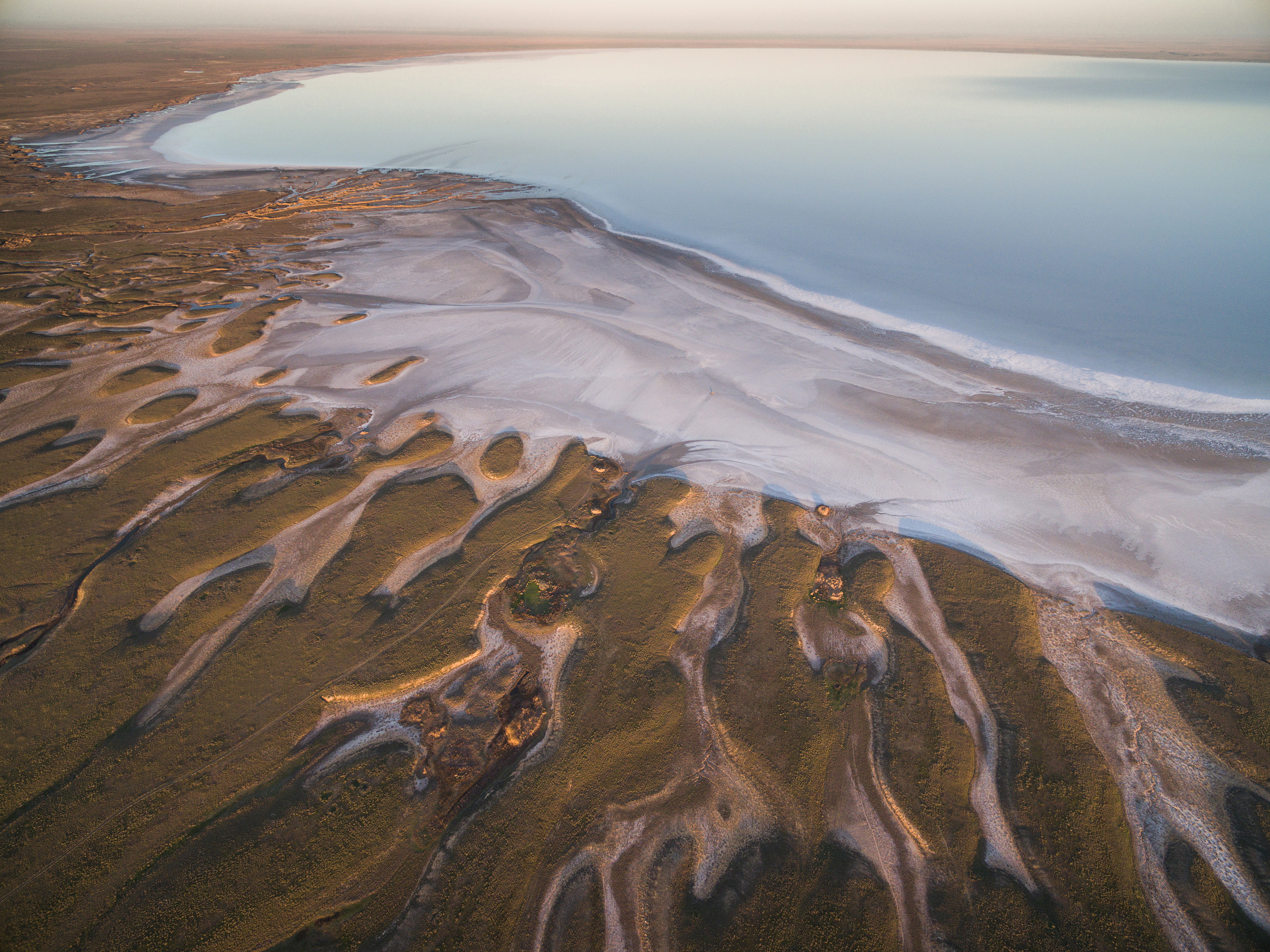
- The shores of Lake Elton

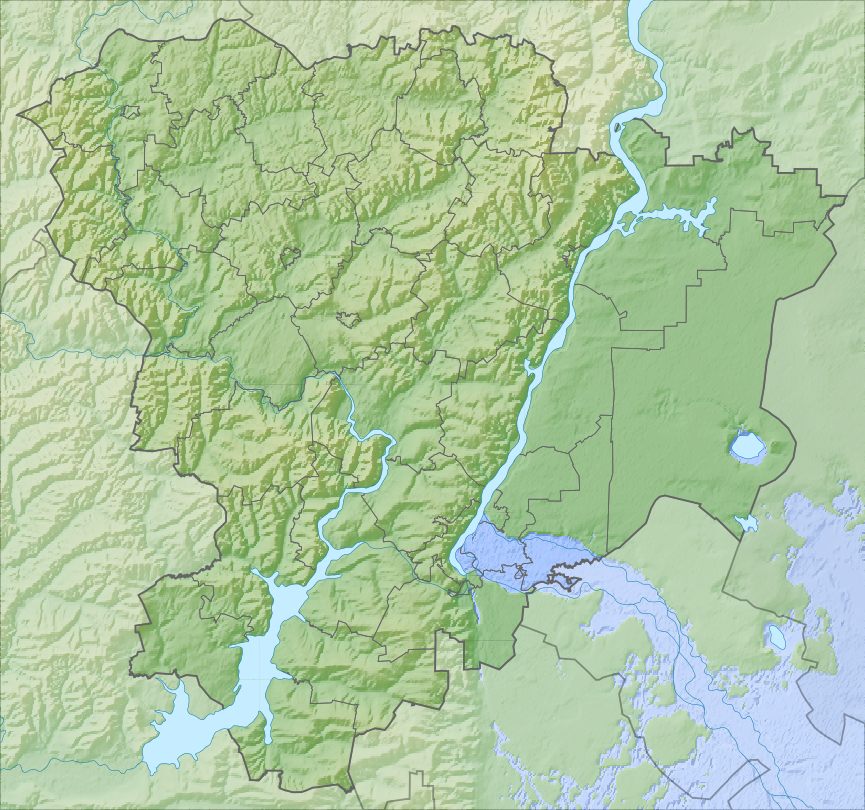
- Location within Russia Lake Elton; Эльтон (Volgograd Oblast) Lake Elton; Эльтон (Continental Asia)
- Location: Volgograd Oblast
- Coordinates: 49°8′0″N 46°40′0″E
- Type: Hypersaline lake
- Basin countries: Russia
- Surface area: 152 km^{2} (59 sq mi)
- Max. depth: 0.6 m (2 ft 0 in)
- Surface elevation: −18 m (−59 ft)

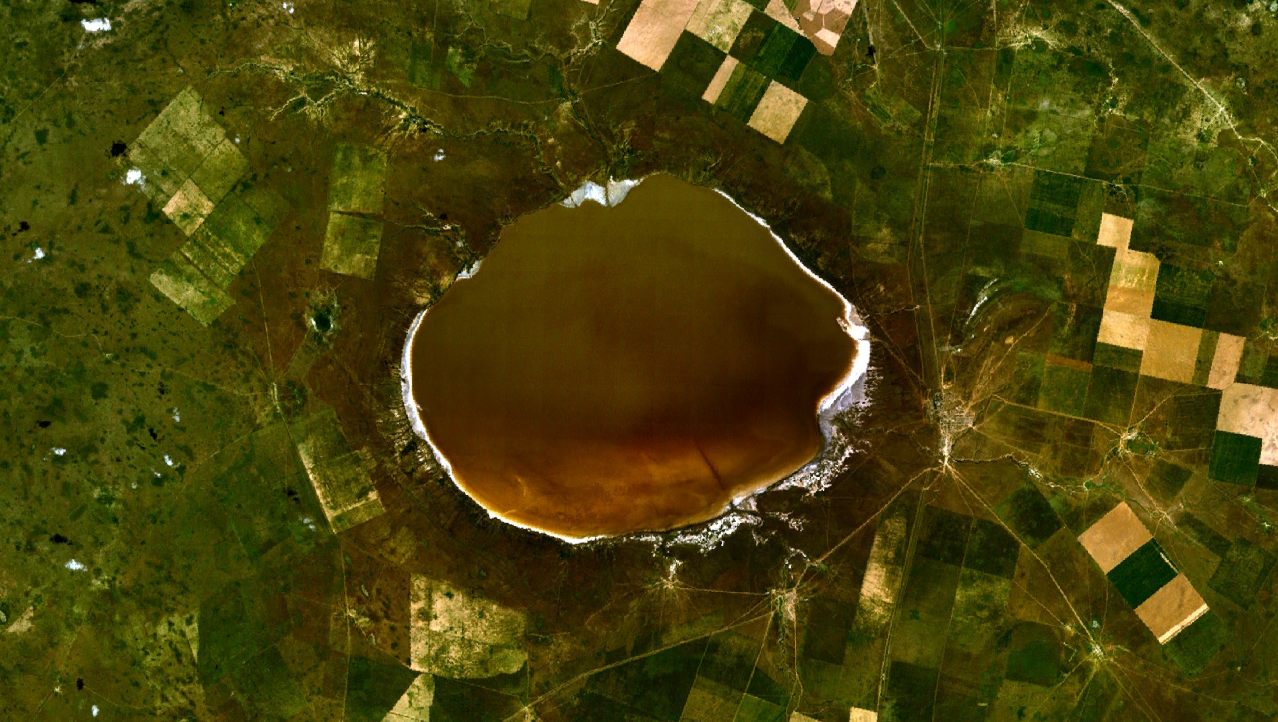
Satellite view of Lake Elton

Lake Elton (Russian: Эльтон; Kazakh: Эльтон, romanized: Elton) is a salt lake in Volgograd Oblast, Russia, near the border with Kazakhstan. It has an area of 152 square kilometres (59 sq mi) and is normally about 0.1 metres (4 in) deep, and about 0.7 to 0.8 metres (28 to 31 in) in spring. Its surface is 18 metres (60 ft) below sea level. The lake's name originates from the Mongol language: “Altyn-Nor” (Golden Bottom). Long ago local nomads used the lake's mineral-rich mud for skin and respiratory treatments. For centuries, Lake Elton was a favorite location for Russian rulers and nobles. One can still see remnants of Catherine II's "bath” there.

It is the largest mineral lake in Europe and one of the most mineralized in the world. The lake is filled with a saturated salt solution. Mineralization is 200–500 grams per litre (27–67 oz/US gal). Salt, extracted from the lake since the early 18th century, is used for the production of magnesium chloride. The water contains Dunaliella salina algae that give a reddish shade to the lake. At the bottom of the lake are salt deposits (mainly NaCl, KCl) and beneath them, a layer of mineral hydrogen sulfide mud.

== Transportation ==
A bus ride can be taken from Volgograd (6 hours mostly because of long stops in rural towns) and also by train from Saratov and Astrakhan (also 6 hours) can lead travelers to the area.

== History ==
Salt was excavated from Elton beginning in the early eighteenth century. Before 1865 the government was the excavator; from 1865 to 1882 the lake was heavily used by private businesses.

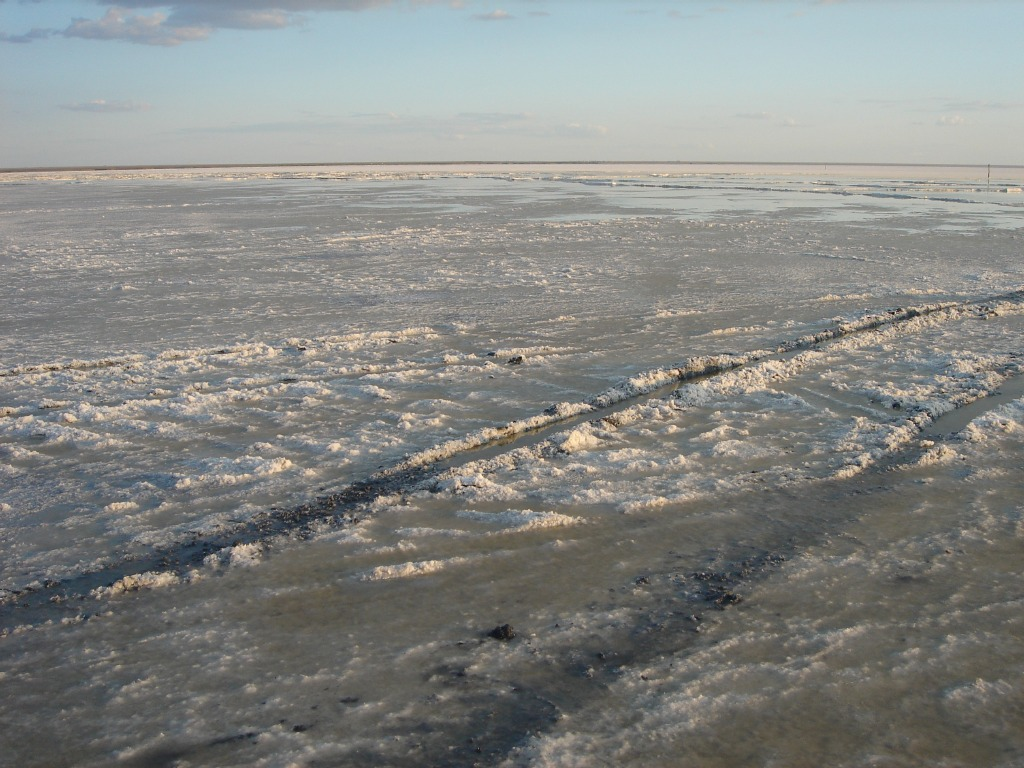
Image of the surface of the lake showing salt deposits

A spa resort has been located near the lake since 1910 and a sanatorium since 1945. Sulfide silt mud and brine from Elton are claimed to have anti-inflammatory, detoxifying, analgesic, relaxing and revitalizing properties.

== Elton Ultra Trail Run ==
The Elton Ultra Trail is one of Russia's toughest races. There are two distances of 38 kilometres (24 mi) and 160 kilometres (100 mi). It was first organized in 2014.

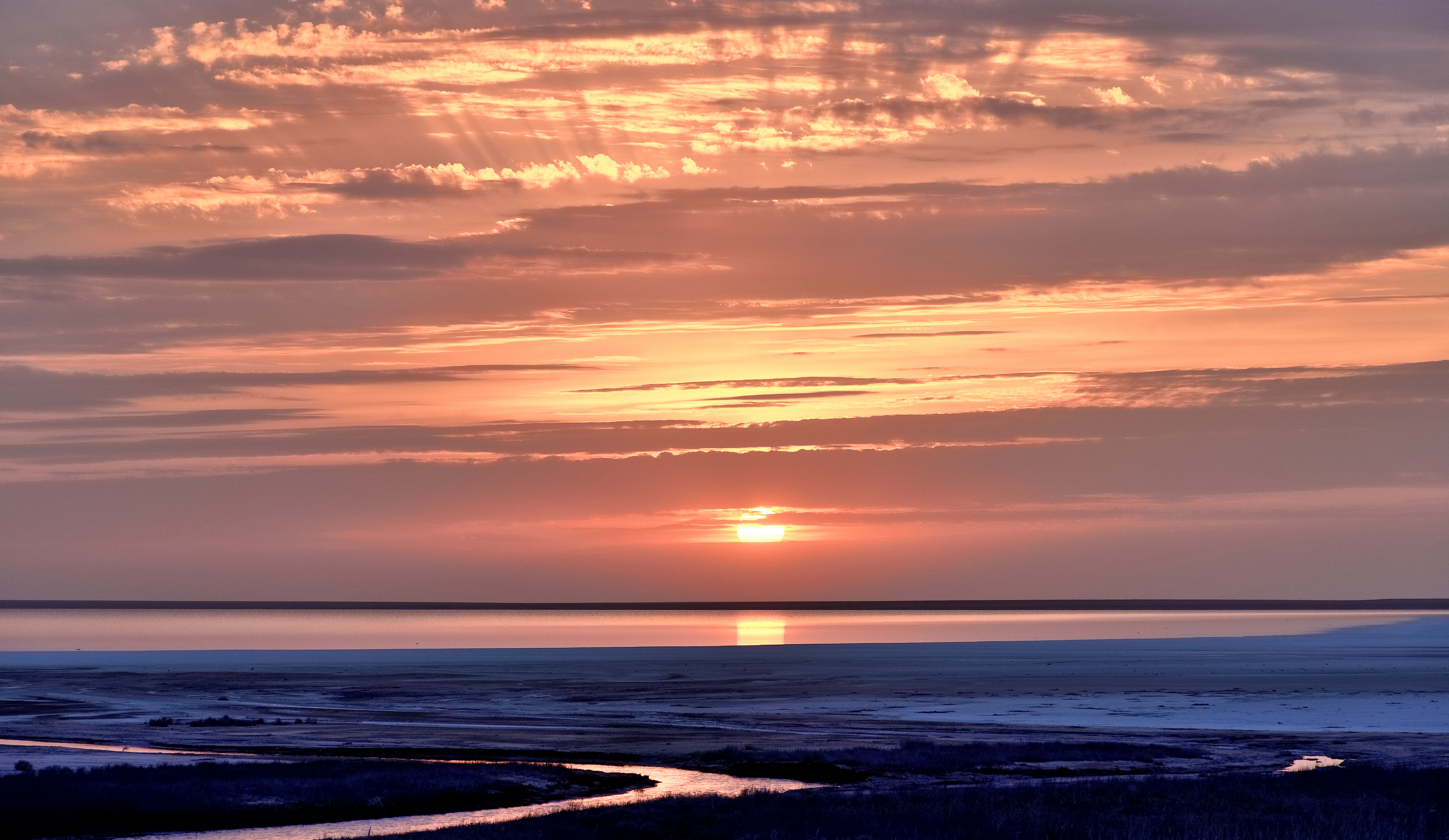
Sunset over Lake Elton

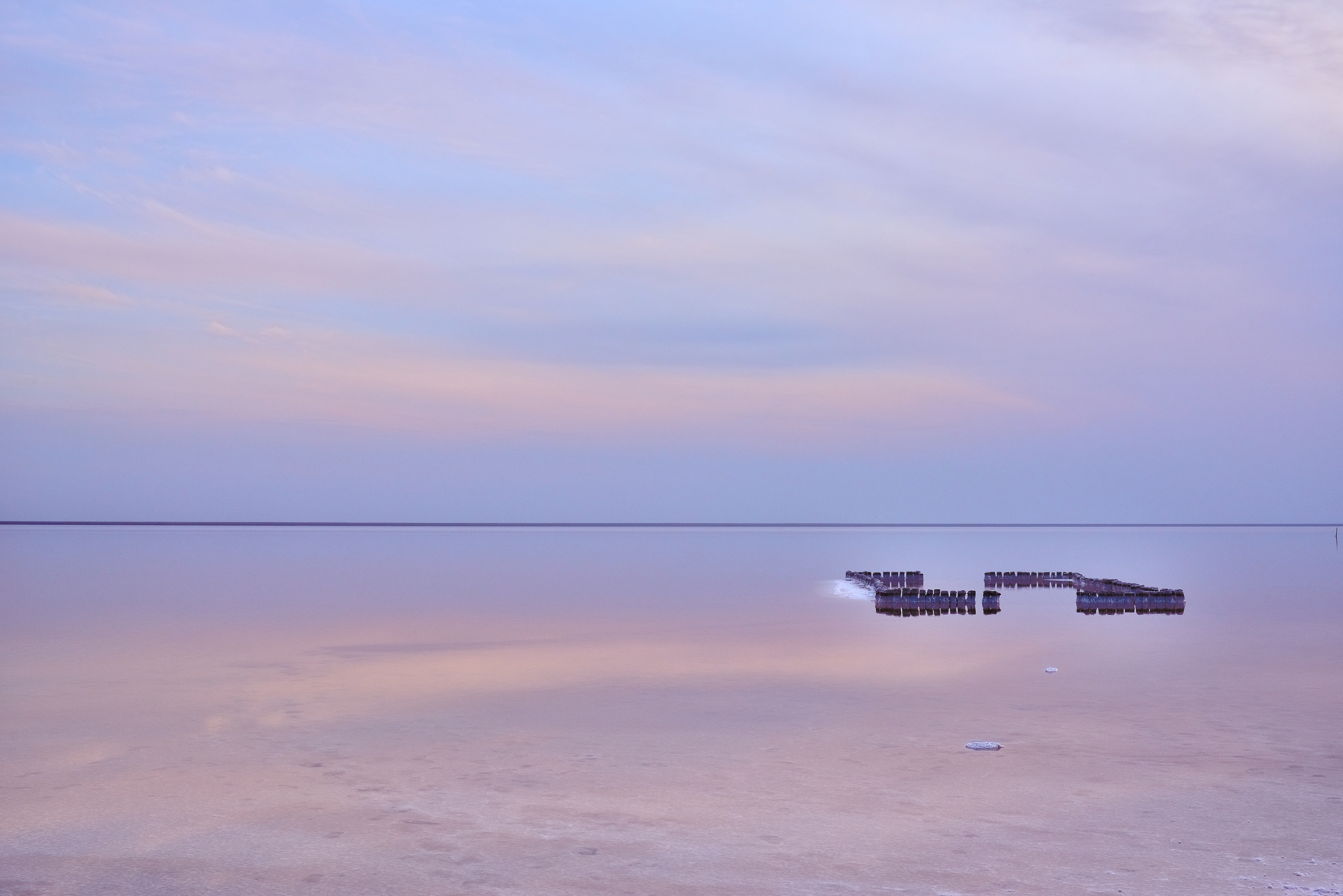
Salty sunset on the lake Elton
