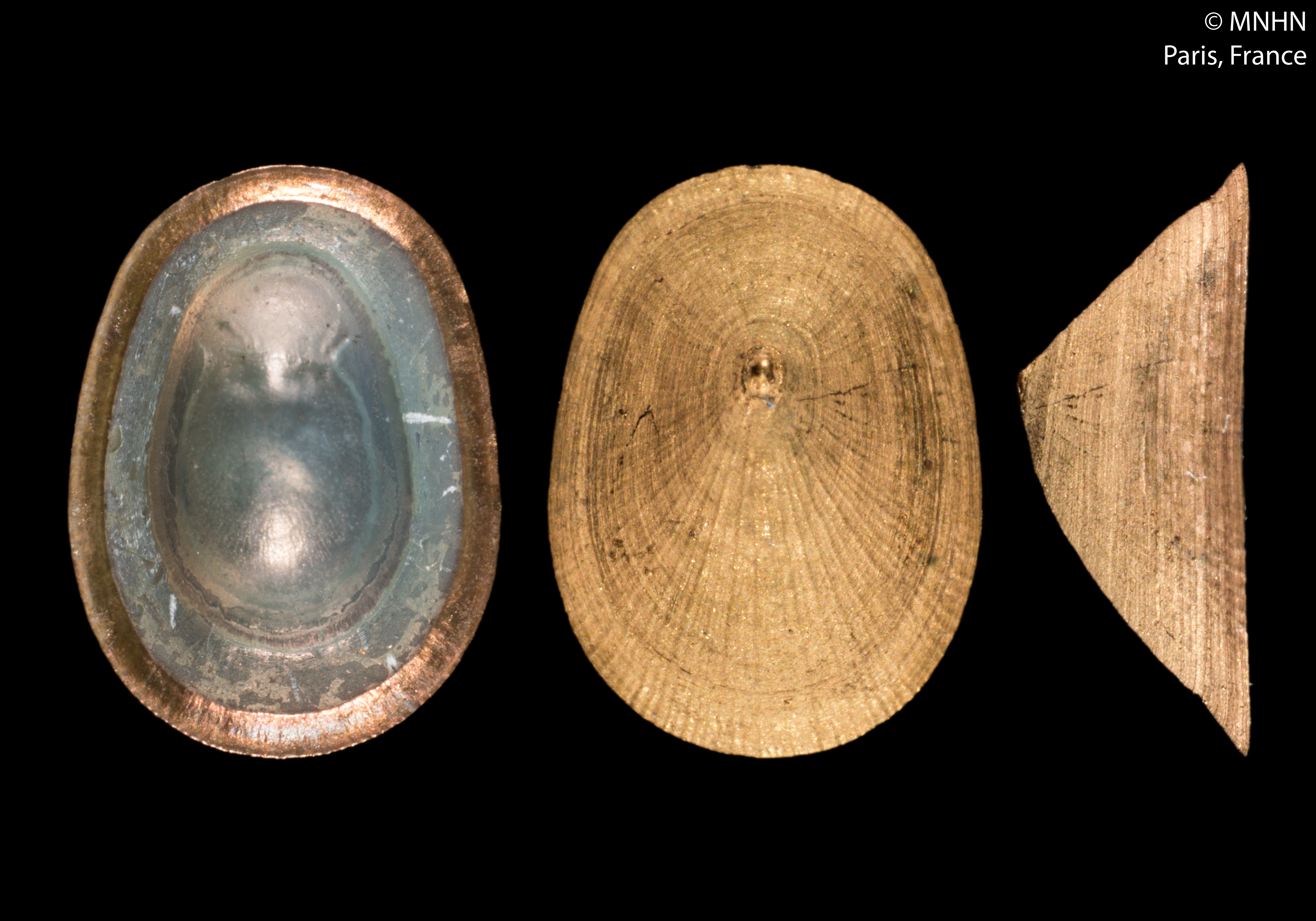
- Paralepetopsis ferrugivora

Scientific classification
- Kingdom: Animalia
- Phylum: Mollusca
- Class: Gastropoda
- Subclass: Patellogastropoda
- Superfamily: Lottioidea
- Family: Neolepetopsidae; McLean, 1990

= Neolepetopsidae =

Family of gastropods

Neolepetopsidae is a family of small deep sea sea snails or true limpets, marine gastropod mollusks in the subclass Patellogastropoda (according to the taxonomy of the Gastropoda by Bouchet & Rocroi, 2005).

This family has no subfamilies.

== Etymology ==
The name of the family Neolepetopsidae is composed of the prefix neo, which means "new", and the word Lepetopsidae, which is the name of an extinct family of true limpets, from which the species within Neolepetopsidae probably evolved.

== Taxonomy ==
Two Neolepetosidae species Eulepetopsis vitrea and Paralepetopsis floridensis were genetically analyzed by Harasewych & McArthur (2000), who confirmed placement of Neolepetopsidae within Acmaeoidea/Lottioidea based on analysis of partial 18S rDNA.

Neolepetopsidae belongs to superfamily Neolepetopsoidea according to the taxonomy of the Gastropoda by Bouchet & Rocroi, 2005).

Neolepetopsoidea was synonymized with Lottioidea so Neolepetopsidae was moved to superfamily Lottioidea in World Register of Marine Species.

== Distribution ==
The distribution of the Neolepetopsidae includes the Northeastern Pacific, the western Pacific (Paralepetopsis rosemariae) and the Mid-Atlantic Ridge.

== Habitat ==
These limpets live in the deep sea. Their habitat includes hydrothermal vents, whalebone (baleen) and whale-fall habitats.

== Genera ==
There are currently known 3 genera and altogether 12 species in Neolepetopsidae:

- Neolepetopsis McLean, 1990 - type genus
  - Neolepetopsis gordensis McLean, 1990 - type species
  - Neolepetopsis densata McLean, 1990
  - Neolepetopsis nicolasensis McLean, 2008 - from whalebone
  - Neolepetopsis verruca McLean, 1990
  - Neolepetopsis occulta McLean, 1990
- Eulepetopsis McLean, 1990
  - Eulepetopsis crystallina C. Chen, Y.-D. Zhou, H. K. Watanabe, R. Y. Zhang & C. S. Wang, 2021
  - Eulepetopsis vitrea McLean, 1990
- Paralepetopsis McLean, 1990
  - Paralepetopsis floridensis McLean 1990 - type species
  - Paralepetopsis clementensis McLean, 2008 - from whalebone
  - Paralepetopsis ferrugivora Warén & Bouchet, 2001
  - Paralepetopsis lepichoni Warén & Bouchet, 2001 - from Nankai Trench
  - Paralepetopsis rosemariae Beck, 1996
  - Paralepetopsis sasakii Warén & Bouchet, 2009
  - Paralepetopsis tunnicliffae McLean, 2008 - from hydrothermal vent
