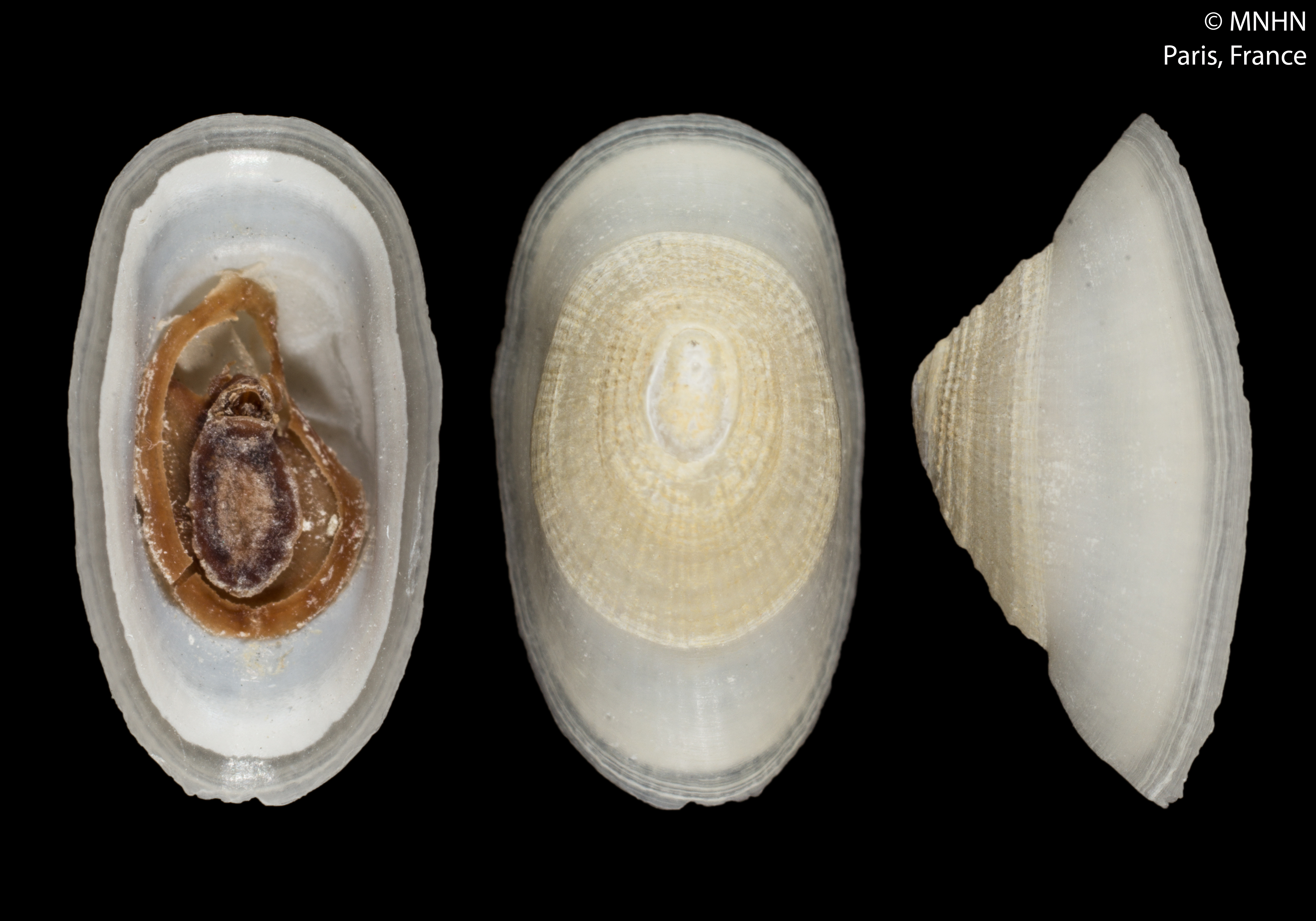
- Shell of Paralepetopsis sasakii (holotype at MNHN, Paris)

Scientific classification
- Kingdom: Animalia
- Phylum: Mollusca
- Class: Gastropoda
- Subclass: Patellogastropoda
- Family: Neolepetopsidae
- Genus: Paralepetopsis
- Species: P. sasakii

Binomial name
- Paralepetopsis sasakii Warén & Bouchet, 2009

= Paralepetopsis sasakii =

Species of gastropod

Paralepetopsis sasakii is a species of sea snail, a true limpet, a marine gastropod mollusc in the family Neolepetopsidae, one of the families of true limpets.

The specific name sasakii is in honor of Takenori Sasaki, the malacologist from the University Museum, the University of Tokyo.

== Distribution ==
This small impet occurs at methane seeps in deep water off the Congo River.
