= Neolepetopsis nicolasensis =

Scientific classification
- Kingdom: Animalia
- Phylum: Mollusca
- Class: Gastropoda
- Subclass: Patellogastropoda
- Family: Neolepetopsidae
- Genus: Neolepetopsis
- Species: N. nicolasensis

Binomial name
- Neolepetopsis nicolasensis McLean, 2008

Species of gastropod

Neolepetopsis nicolasensis is a species of sea snail, a true limpet, a marine gastropod mollusk in the family Neolepetopsidae, one of the families of true limpets.

== Distribution ==
northeastern Pacific Ocean

== Habitat ==
whale bone
