= Eulepetopsis vitrea =

Conservation status
- Near Threatened (IUCN 3.1)

Scientific classification
- Kingdom: Animalia
- Phylum: Mollusca
- Class: Gastropoda
- Subclass: Patellogastropoda
- Family: Neolepetopsidae
- Genus: Eulepetopsis
- Species: E. vitrea

Binomial name
- Eulepetopsis vitrea McLean, 1990

Species of gastropod

Eulepetopsis vitrea is a species of sea snail, a true limpet, a marine gastropod mollusk in the family Neolepetopsidae, one of the families of true limpets. It lives in the Galapagos Rift and the East Pacific Rise, and can be found in hydrothermal vents.
