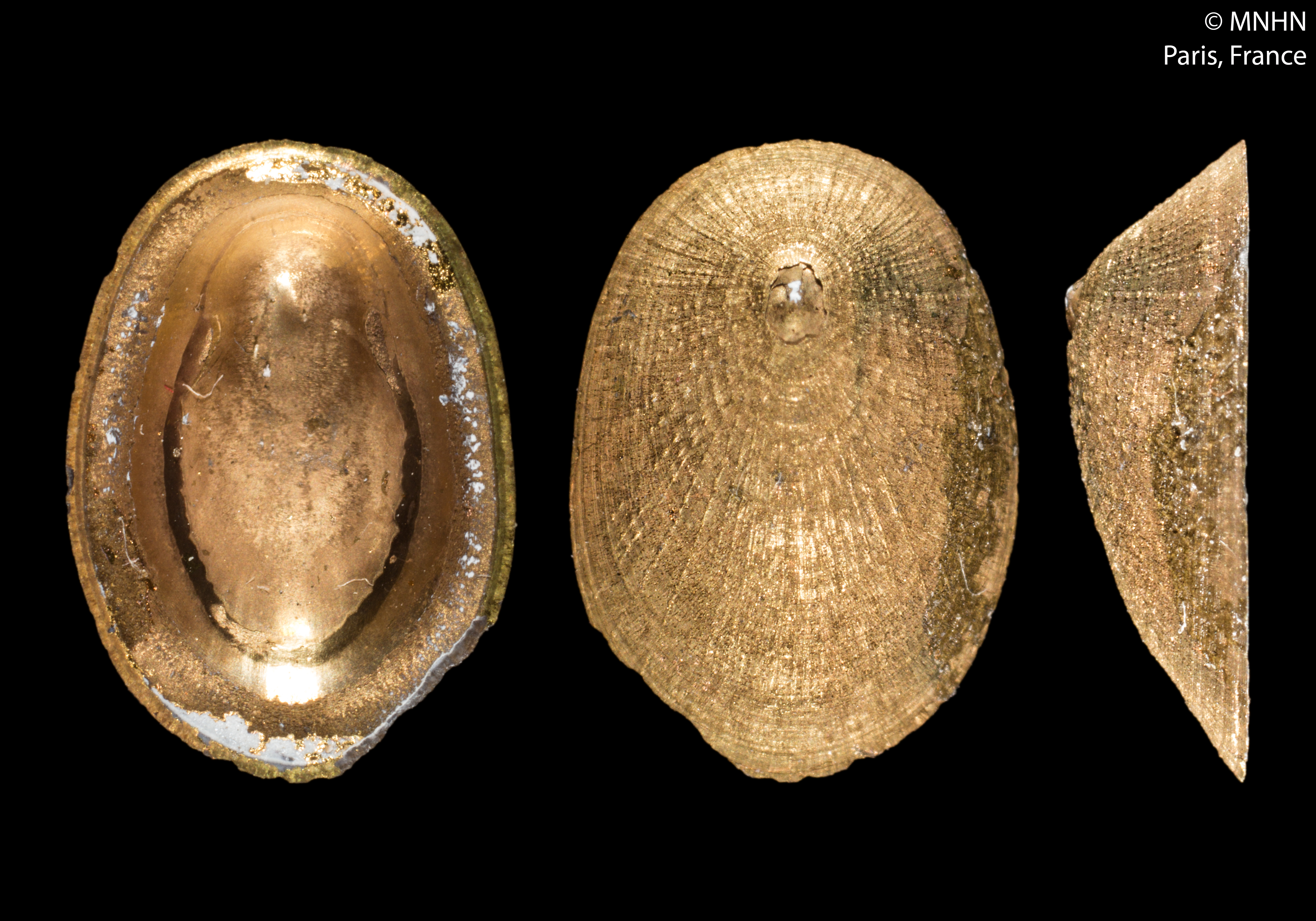
- Shell of Paralepetopsis lepichoni (holotype at MNHN, Paris)

Scientific classification
- Kingdom: Animalia
- Phylum: Mollusca
- Class: Gastropoda
- Subclass: Patellogastropoda
- Family: Neolepetopsidae
- Genus: Paralepetopsis
- Species: P. lepichoni

Binomial name
- Paralepetopsis lepichoni Warén & Bouchet, 2001

= Paralepetopsis lepichoni =

Species of mollusk

Paralepetopsis lepichoni is a species of sea snail, a true limpet, a marine gastropod mollusC in the family Neolepetopsidae, one of the families of true limpets. It is part of the subclass of Gastropoda called Vetigastropoda.

== Description ==
Paralepetopsis lepichoni does not develop apical cusps.

== Distribution ==
Paralepetopsis lepichoni was discovered in Nankai Trough off south-eastern Honshu, Japan.
