= Brackish water =

Water with salinity between freshwater and seawater

Brackish water, sometimes termed brack water, is water occurring in a natural environment that has more salinity than freshwater, but not as much as seawater. It may result from mixing seawater (salt water) and fresh water, as in estuaries, or it may occur in brackish fossil aquifers. The word comes from the Middle Dutch root brak. Certain human activities can produce brackish water, in particular civil engineering projects such as dikes and the flooding of coastal marshland to produce brackish water pools for freshwater prawn farming. Brackish water is also the primary waste product of the salinity gradient power process. Because brackish water is hostile to the growth of most terrestrial plant species, without appropriate management it can be damaging to the environment, such as in the case of shrimp farming.

Technically, brackish water contains between 0.5 and 30 grams of salt per liter—more often expressed as 0.5 to 30 parts per thousand (‰), which is a specific gravity of between 1.0004 and 1.0226. Thus, brackish covers a range of salinity regimes and is not considered a precisely defined condition. It is characteristic of many brackish surface waters that their salinity can vary considerably over space or time. Water with a salt concentration greater than 30‰ is considered saline.

== Brackish water habitats ==
=== Estuaries ===
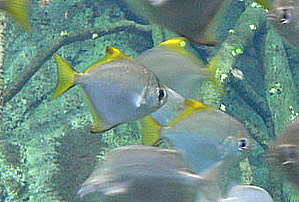
A brackish water fish: Monodactylus argenteus

Brackish water conditions commonly occur when fresh water meets seawater. In fact, the most extensive brackish water habitats worldwide are estuaries, where a river meets the sea.

The River Thames flowing through London is a classic river estuary. The town of Teddington a few miles west of London marks the boundary between the tidal and non-tidal parts of the Thames, although it is still considered a freshwater river about as far east as Battersea insofar as the average salinity is very low and the fish fauna consists predominantly of freshwater species such as roach, dace, carp, perch, and pike. The Thames Estuary becomes brackish between Battersea and Gravesend, and the diversity of freshwater fish species present is smaller, primarily roach and dace; euryhaline marine species such as flounder, European seabass, mullet, and smelt become much more common. Further east, the salinity increases and the freshwater fish species are completely replaced by euryhaline marine ones, until the river reaches Gravesend, at which point conditions become fully marine and the fish fauna resembles that of the adjacent North Sea and includes both euryhaline and stenohaline marine species. A similar pattern of replacement can be observed with the aquatic plants and invertebrates living in the river.

This type of ecological succession from freshwater to marine ecosystem is typical of river estuaries. River estuaries form important staging points during the migration of anadromous and catadromous fish species, such as salmon, shad and eels, giving them time to form social groups and to adjust to the changes in salinity. Salmon are anadromous, meaning they live in the sea but ascend rivers to spawn; eels are catadromous, living in rivers and streams, but returning to the sea to breed. Besides the species that migrate through estuaries, there are many other fish that use them as "nursery grounds" for spawning or as places young fish can feed and grow before moving elsewhere. Herring and plaice are two commercially important species that use the Thames Estuary for this purpose.

Estuaries are also commonly used as fishing grounds and as places for fish farming or ranching. For example, Atlantic salmon farms are often located in estuaries, although this has caused controversy, because in doing so, fish farmers expose migrating wild fish to large numbers of external parasites such as sea lice that escape from the pens the farmed fish are kept in.

=== Mangroves ===
Another important brackish-water habitat is the mangrove swamp or mangal. Many, though not all, mangrove swamps fringe estuaries and lagoons where the salinity changes with each tide. Among the most specialised residents of mangrove forests are mudskippers, fish that forage for food on land, and archerfish, perch-like fish that "spit" at insects and other small animals living in the trees, knocking them into the water where they can be eaten. Like estuaries, mangrove swamps are extremely important breeding grounds for many fish, with species such as snappers, halfbeaks, and tarpon spawning or maturing among them. Besides fish, numerous other animals use mangroves, including such species as the saltwater crocodile, American crocodile, proboscis monkey, diamondback terrapin, and the crab-eating frog, Fejervarya cancrivora (formerly Rana cancrivora). Mangroves represent important nesting sites for numerous bird groups such as herons, storks, spoonbills, ibises, kingfishers, shorebirds and seabirds.

Although often plagued with mosquitoes and other insects that make them unpleasant for humans, mangrove swamps are very important buffer zones between land and sea, and are a natural defense against hurricane and tsunami damage in particular.

The Sundarbans and Bhitarkanika Mangroves are two of the largest mangrove forests in the world, both on the coast of the Bay of Bengal.

=== Brackish seas and lakes ===
Some seas and lakes are brackish. The Baltic Sea is a brackish sea adjoining the North Sea. Originally the Eridanos river system prior to the Pleistocene, since then it has been flooded by the North Sea but still receives so much freshwater from the adjacent lands that the water is brackish. As seawater is denser, the water in the Baltic is stratified, with seawater at the bottom and freshwater at the top. Limited mixing occurs because of the lack of tides and storms, with the result that the fish fauna at the surface is freshwater in composition while that lower down is more marine. Cod are an example of a species only found in deep water in the Baltic, while pike are confined to the less saline surface waters.

The Caspian Sea is the world's largest lake and contains brackish water with a salinity about one-third that of normal seawater. The Caspian is famous for its peculiar animal fauna, including one of the few non-marine seals (the Caspian seal) and the great sturgeons, a major source of caviar.

Hudson Bay is a brackish marginal sea of the Arctic Ocean, it remains brackish due to its limited connections to the open ocean, very high levels of freshwater surface runoff input from the large Hudson Bay drainage basin, and low rate of evaporation due to being completely covered in ice for over half the year.

In the Black Sea the surface water is brackish with an average salinity of about 17–18 parts per thousand compared to 30 to 40 for the oceans. The deep, anoxic water of the Black Sea originates from warm, salty water of the Mediterranean.

Lake Texoma, a reservoir on the border between the U.S. states of Texas and Oklahoma, is a rare example of a brackish lake that is neither part of an endorheic basin nor a direct arm of the ocean, though its salinity is considerably lower than that of the other bodies of water mentioned here. The reservoir was created by the damming of the Red River of the South, which (along with several of its tributaries) receives large amounts of salt from natural seepage from buried deposits in the upstream region. The salinity is high enough that striped bass, a fish normally found only in salt water, has self-sustaining populations in the lake.

=== Brackish marsh ===
Brackish marshes develop from salt marshes where a significant freshwater influx dilutes the seawater to brackish levels of salinity. This commonly happens upstream from salt marshes by estuaries of coastal rivers or near the mouths of coastal rivers with heavy freshwater discharges in conditions of low tidal ranges.

=== Other brackish bodies of water ===
- Anchialine pool – Landlocked body of water with underground connection to the sea

== Human uses ==
Brackish water is used by humans in many different sectors. It is commonly used as cooling water for power generation and in a variety of ways in the mining, oil, and gas industries. Once desalinated it can also be used for agriculture, livestock, and municipal uses. Brackish water can be treated using reverse osmosis, electrodialysis, and other filtration processes.

== See also ==
- List of brackish bodies of water
- Biosalinity – Use of salty water for irrigation
- Brackish-water aquarium
- Desalination – Removal of salts from water
- Halocline – Stratification of a body of water due to salinity differences
