= Neolepetopsis gordensis =

Conservation status
- Vulnerable (IUCN 3.1)

Scientific classification
- Kingdom: Animalia
- Phylum: Mollusca
- Class: Gastropoda
- Subclass: Patellogastropoda
- Family: Neolepetopsidae
- Genus: Neolepetopsis
- Species: N. gordensis

Binomial name
- Neolepetopsis gordensis McLean, 1990

Species of gastropod

Neolepetopsis gordensis is a species of sea snail, a true limpet, a marine gastropod mollusk in the family Neolepetopsidae, one of the families of true limpets.

Neolepetopsis gordensis is the type species in the genus Neolepetopsis.

The specific name gordensis comes from Gorda Ridge, where this species was found.

== Distribution ==
Gorda Ridge
