= Pikrolimni (municipality) =

Pikrolimni Πικρολίμνη
- Municipal unit
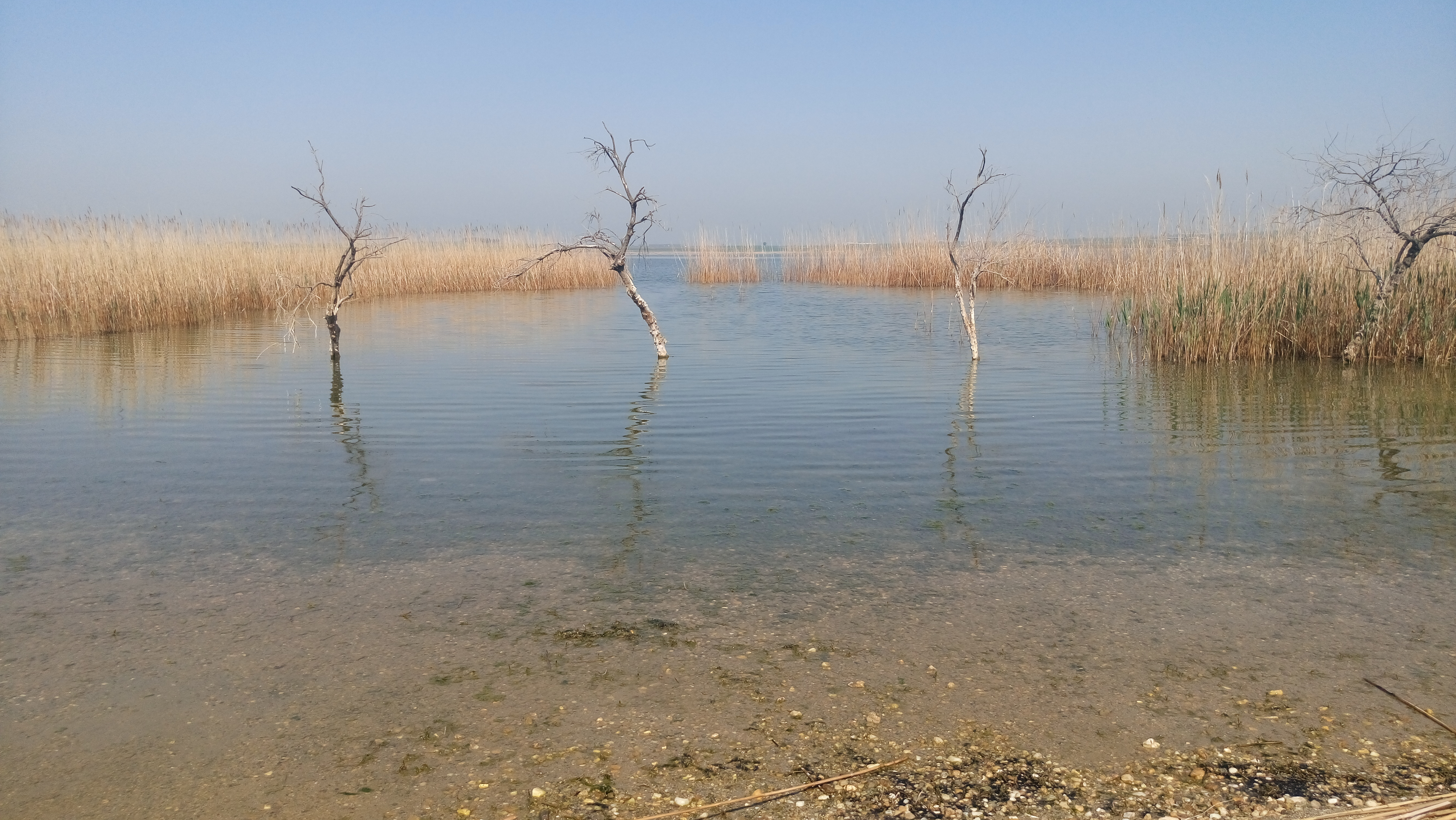
- Lake Pikrolimni, known for its high salinity and pelotherapeutic properties, as well as an endangered bird habitat

- Location within the regional unit

- Location within Greece
- Coordinates: 40°52′N 22°48′E
- Country: Greece
- Administrative region: Central Macedonia
- Regional unit: Kilkis
- Municipality: Kilkis

Area
  - Municipal unit: 164.1 km^{2} (63.4 sq mi)

Population (2021)
  - Municipal unit: 4,297
  - Municipal unit density: 26.19/km^{2} (67.82/sq mi)
- Time zone: UTC+2 (EET)
  - Summer (DST): UTC+3 (EEST)
- Vehicle registration: ΚΙ

Pikrolimni (Greek: Πικρολίμνη) is a former municipality in the Kilkis regional unit, Greece. Since the Kallikratis Plan for local government reform was implemented in 2011, Pikrolimni is administrated as part and constitutes a municipal unit of the municipality of Kilkis. The municipal unit has an area of 164.06 km^{2}, and its population in the 2021 census was 4,297, down from 7,395 in 2001. The seat of the municipality was Mikrokampos.

The namesake of the region, as well as its most famous attraction, is the salt lake Pikrolimni which has been historically important as a source of natron in antiquity and recognised to this day for its pelo- and balneotherapeutic properties.

== Subdivisions ==
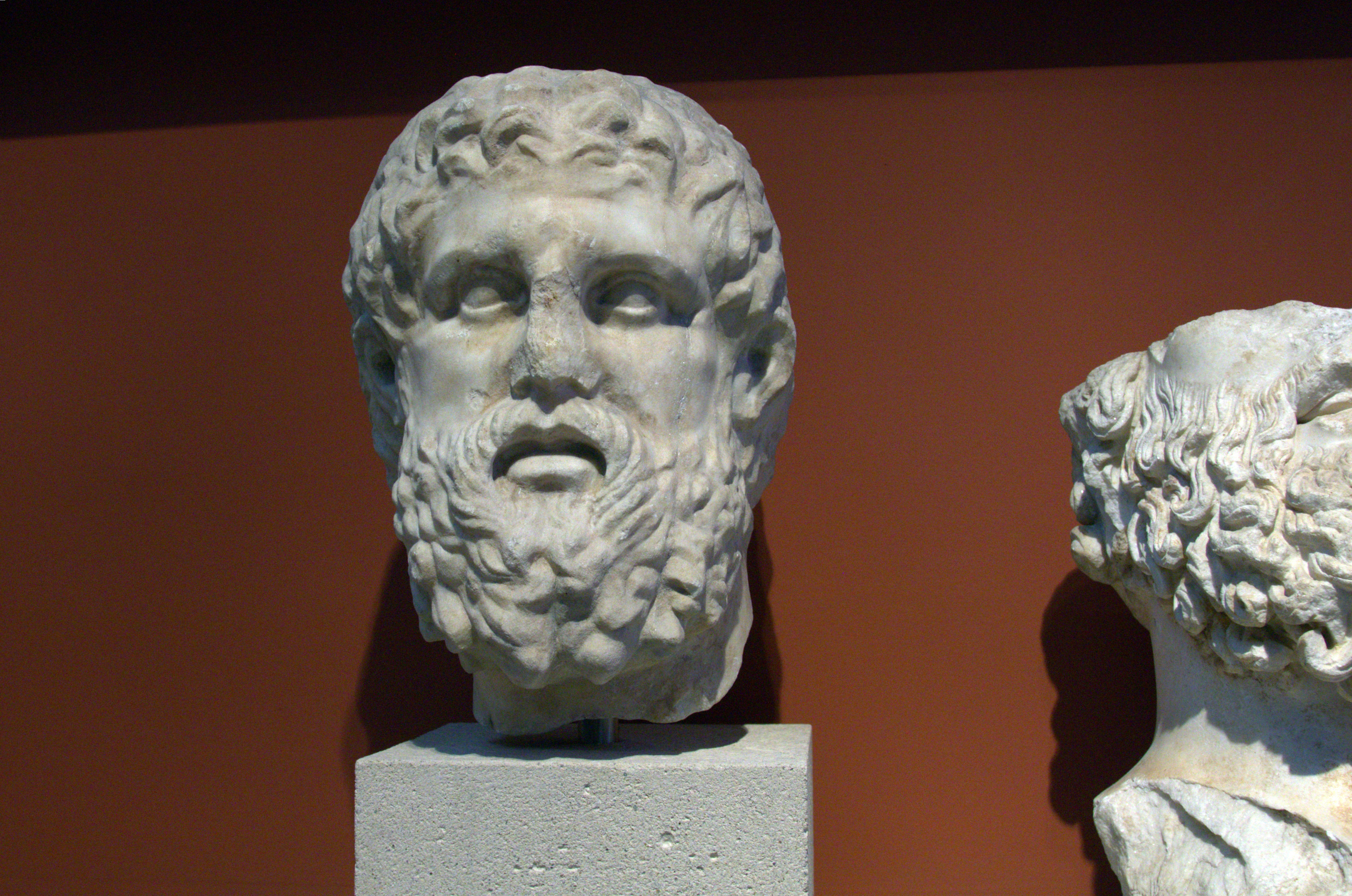
Head from statue of Asclepius at his sanctuary in ancient Morrylos (late 4th c. B.C.), found in Ano Apostoloi

The current municipal unit (and former municipality) is subdivided into the following communities:

- Mikrokampos, containing the village Mikrokampos (Μικρόκαμπος), earlier called Ali Hodzhalar from which chieftains of the Greek Struggle for Macedonia Ioannis Koutsokostas and Evlampios Vyziinos hailed.
- Anthofyto, containing the village Anthofyto (Ανθόφυτο), earlier name Sari Pazar, near which a prehistoric toumba and settlement named "Anthofyto A" has been discovered.
- Mavroneri, containing villages:

Mavroneri (Μαυρονέρι), originally the Turkish-inhabited Kara Bunar, repopulated in 1928 by Greek refugees from Asia Minor after the population exchange as a result of the Treaty of Lausanne.
Ano Apostoloi (Άνω Απόστολοι), earlier name just Apostoloi or Paliokklisia (15th century AD), near the ancient Macedonian town of Morrylos, home of a cult of Asclepius.
Mesoi Apostoloi (Μέσοι Απόστολοι), founded in 1924 near Apostoloi by Greek refugees from Asia Minor and the Pontus.

- Neo Agioneri, containing the village Neo Agioneri (Νέο Αγιονέρι), also known as Nea Varlantza/Verlatza, founded in 1926 by Cappadocian Greek refugees from Cappadocia.
- Neo Gynaikokastro, containing villages:

Neo Gynaikokastro (Νέο Γυναικόκαστρο), older names Avret Hisar and Nea Dimitra, in the vicinity of the 14th century castle built by Andronikos III Palaiologos and since 1926 populated by Greek refugees from Eastern Thrace (Çatalca district) and the Caucasus.
Vakoufi (Βακούφι), first officially listed as a settlement in 1940.
Kato Apostoloi (Κάτω Απόστολοι), locally also called Thrakiotiko, founded in 1922 near Apostoloi by Greek refugees from Eastern Thrace (hence the local name).
Kokartza (Κοκάρτζα), populated in 1928 by Greek refugees from Asia Minor.

- Palaio Agioneri, containing the village Palaio Agioneri (Παλαιό Αγιονέρι), earlier name just Agioneri or Verlatza, repopulated in the early 1920s by Pontic Greek refugees mainly from the Caucasus.
- Xylokeratia, containing villages:

Xylokeratia (Ξυλοκερατιά), older name Hadzhilar, located near the ruins of the ancient city Clitae (centre of ancient natron production from lake Pikrolimni) and by the early 20th century inhabited by Bulgarians and Turks before the population exchanges in the aftermath of the Balkan and Greco-Turkish wars; afterwards repopulated by Greek refugees mostly from Eastern Rumelia (southern Bulgaria).
Mpakeika (Μπακαίικα), near a different prehistotic settlement (location Lofos Karditsa), first officially listed as a settlement in 1961.
Pikrolimni (Πικρολίμνη), previously known as Gyolbash, originally Bulgarian-inhabited until repopulated by Greek refugees from Asia Minor, Eastern Thrace and the Pontus as a result of population exchange.
