= Nea Filadelfeia, Thessaloniki =

Nea Filadelfeia Νέα Φιλαδέλφεια
- Community
- Location within Greece
- Coordinates: 40°47.9′N 22°50.4′E
- Country: Greece
- Administrative region: Central Macedonia
- Regional unit: Thessaloniki
- Municipality: Oraiokastro
- Municipal unit: Kallithea

Area
  - Community: 12.624 km^{2} (4.874 sq mi)
- Elevation: 75 m (246 ft)

Population (2021)
  - Community: 770
  - Density: 61/km^{2} (160/sq mi)
- Time zone: UTC+2 (EET)
  - Summer (DST): UTC+3 (EEST)
- Postal code: 545 00
- Area code: +30-231
- Vehicle registration: NA to NX

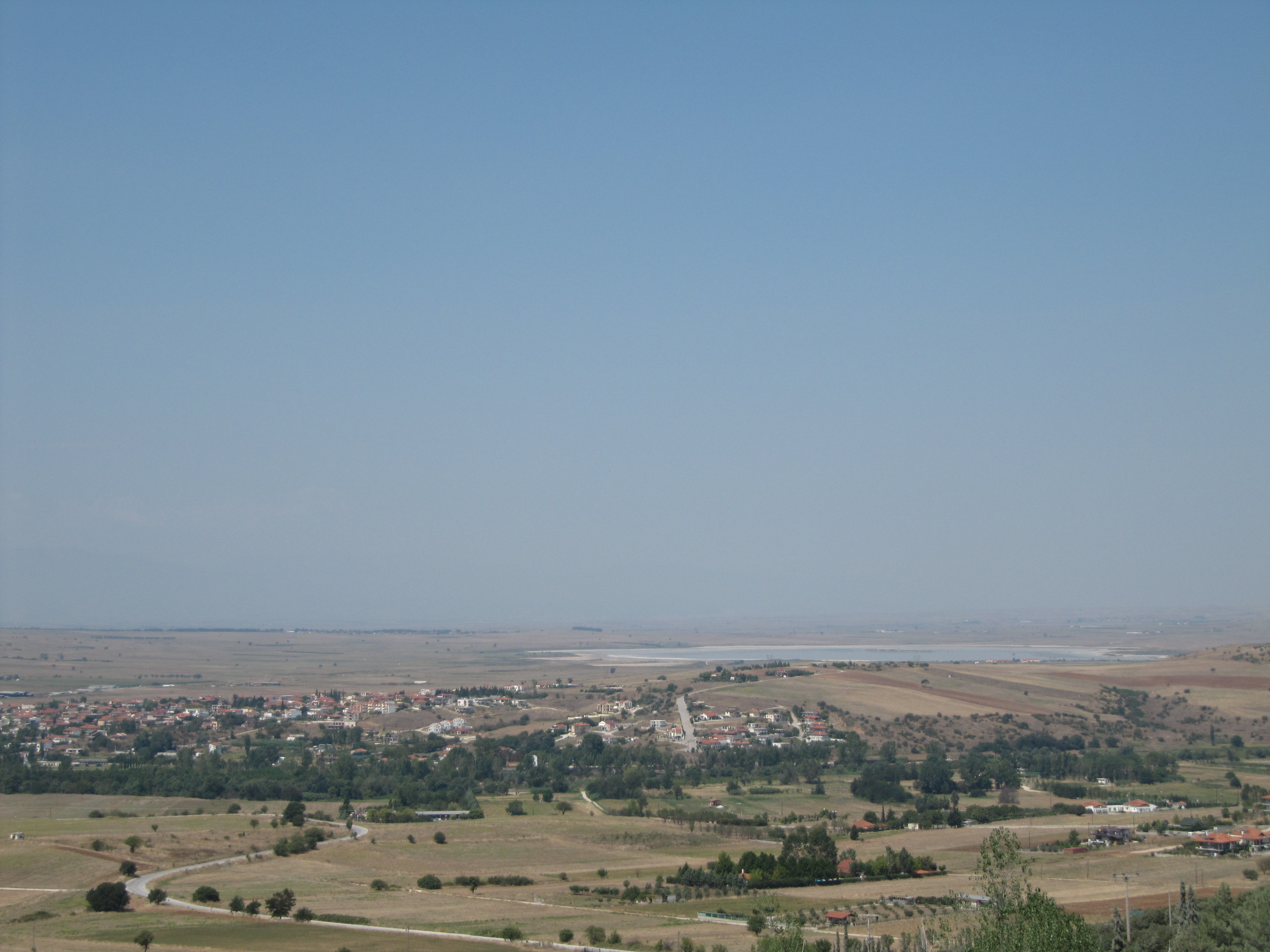
Panoramic view of Nea Filadelfeia.

Nea Filadelfeia (Greek: Νέα Φιλαδέλφεια), known before 1927 as Naresh (Greek: Νάρες), is a village and a community of the Oraiokastro municipality. Before the 2011 local government reform it was part of the municipality of Kallithea, of which it was a municipal district. The 2021 census recorded 770 inhabitants in the village. The community of Nea Filadelfeia covers an area of 12.624 km^{2}.

== Transport ==
The village is served by a station on Thessaloniki–Alexandroupoli line.

== See also ==
- List of settlements in the Thessaloniki regional unit
