= Green Seamount =

Underwater volcano off the western coast of Mexico

- Location within Mexico
- Summit depth: 2,100 ft (640 m)
- Height: 535 ft (163 m)
- Summit area: 17 km^{3} (4 cu mi)

Location
- Coordinates: 20°48.89′N 109°17.89′W
- Country: Mexico

Geology
- Type: Seamount (underwater volcano)
- Age of rock: up to 260,000 years old

Green Seamount is a small seamount (an underwater volcano) off the western coast of Mexico. It and the nearby Red Seamount were visited in 1982 by an expedition using DSV Alvin, which observed the seamount's sedimentary composition, sulfur chimneys, and biology. Thus, Green Seamount is well-characterized for such a small feature.

== Geology ==
Green Seamount has a minimal sedimentary cover (0–10 cm (0.0–3.9 in) of unusually fine sands, with the exception of its more thickly covered caldera (where it was over 50 cm (20 in) thick). Green Seamount is also home to a small number of hydrothermal vents near its caldera wall, which Alvin observed (on Red Seamount) to be oxide-rich with temperatures of 13.5 °C (56 °F), very low temperatures for a hydrothermal vent. Non-hydrothermal sediments on the volcano were observed to be light, "cream-colored" carbonates thinly masked in a finer gray and green sediment.

The expedition also noted sulfur mounds near the caldera and pit crater walls; these are unusual because, unlike most mid-ocean ridge seamounts, Green's "sulfur chimneys" contain a high amount of silicon, iron, copper, and quartz, but are poor in zinc. The complicated process that created the vents occurred between 140,000 and 70,000 years ago, and by looking at the sulfur chimneys scientists can estimate that it has taken about 260,000 years for the Green Seamount to reach its present height. There is also an iron-manganese crust on a small off-axis seamount that adjoins Green Seamount, a configuration common with sulfur-rich seamounts.

== Biology ==
Green Seamount is not very biologically diverse. The only fauna observed at its hydrothermal sites were single-celled, fan-shaped xenophyophores, and some shrimp. Still, marks of biological life were plentiful wherever sediments were 5 cm (2 in) or more deep. The xenophyophores in particular were of a type that was found on many of the seamounts in the eastern Pacific region. Alvin took two samples, a sponge of the Hexactinellid family and barnacles of the Sessilia order, back to the surface for analysis.
