= Hypersaline lake =

Landlocked body of water that contains concentrations of salts greater than the sea

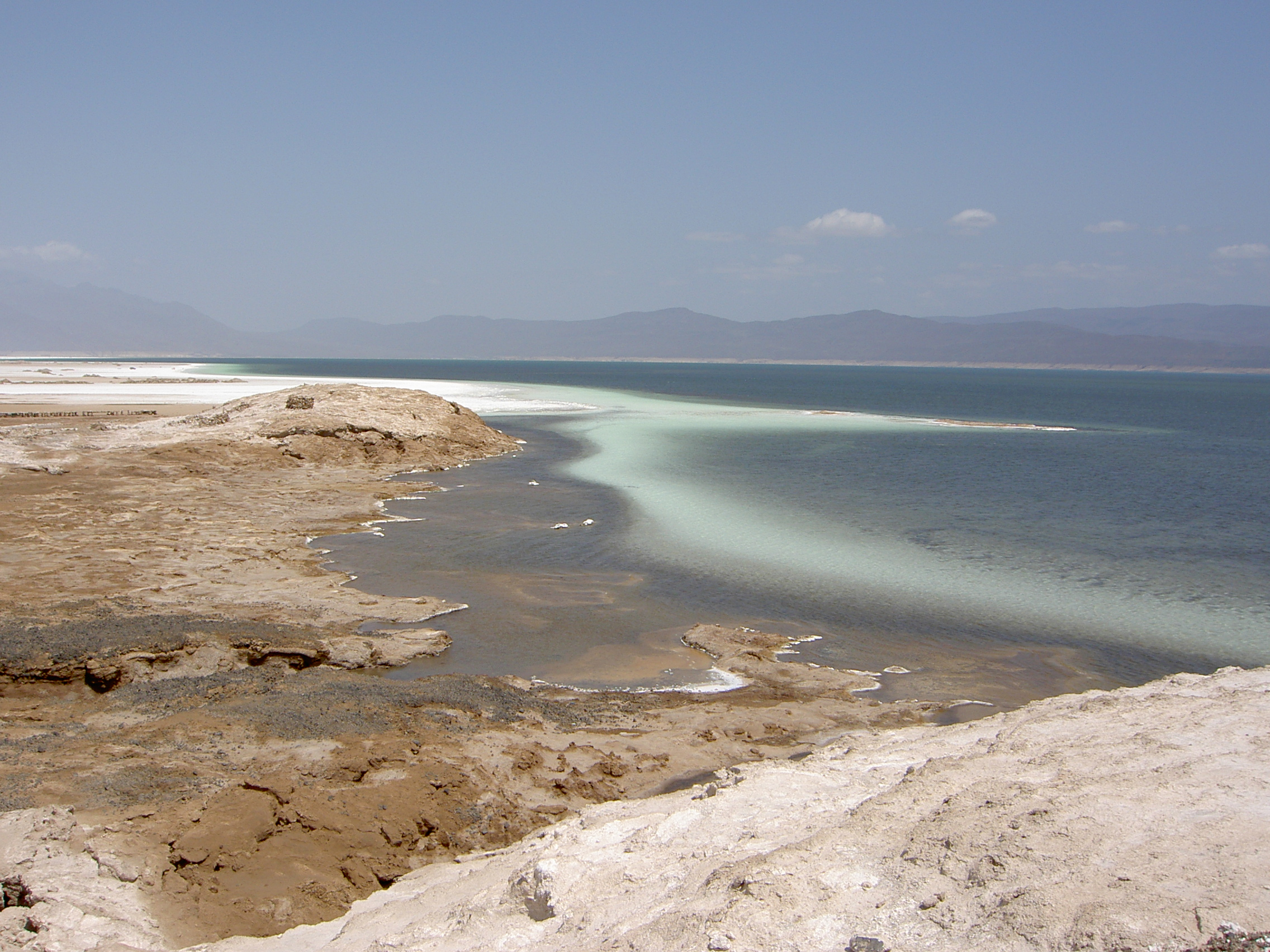
Lake Assal, one of the most saline lakes outside of Antarctica

A hypersaline lake is a landlocked body of water that contains significant concentrations of sodium chloride, brines, and other salts, with saline levels surpassing those of ocean water (3.5%, i.e. 35 grams per litre or 0.29 pounds per US gallon).

Specific microbial species can thrive in high-salinity environments that are inhospitable to most lifeforms, including some that are thought to contribute to the color of pink lakes. Some of these species enter a dormant state when desiccated, and some species are thought to survive for over 250 million years.

The water in hypersaline lakes has great buoyancy due to its high salt content.

Hypersaline lakes are found on every continent, especially in arid or semi-arid regions.

In the Arctic, the Canadian Devon Ice Cap contains two subglacial lakes that are hypersaline. In Antarctica, there are larger hypersaline water bodies, lakes in the McMurdo Dry Valleys such as Lake Vanda with salinity of over 35% (i.e. 10 times as salty as ocean water).

The most saline water body in the world is the Gaet'ale Pond, located in the Danakil Depression in Afar, Ethiopia. The water of Gaet'ale Pond has a salinity of 43%, making it the saltiest water body on Earth (i.e. 12 times as salty as ocean water). Previously, it was considered that the most saline lake outside of Antarctica was Lake Assal, in Djibouti, which has a salinity of 34.8% (i.e. 10 times as salty as ocean water). The best-known hypersaline lakes are the Dead Sea (34.2% salinity in 2010) and the Great Salt Lake in the state of Utah, US (5–27% variable salinity). The Dead Sea, dividing Israel and the West Bank from Jordan, is the world's deepest hypersaline lake. The Great Salt Lake, while having nearly three times the surface area of the Dead Sea, is shallower and experiences much greater fluctuations in salinity. At its lowest recorded water levels, it approaches 7.7 times the salinity of ocean water, but when its levels are high, its salinity drops to only slightly higher than that of the ocean.

== See also ==
- Brine pool – Accumulation of brine in a seafloor depression
- Halocline – Stratification of a body of water due to salinity differences
- Halophile – organism that thrives in high salt concentrations
- List of bodies of water by salinity
- Pink lake
- Salt lake – one with a concentration of salts and minerals significantly higher than most lakes
