= Haloferax larsenii =

Scientific classification
- Domain: Archaea
- Kingdom: Methanobacteriati
- Phylum: Methanobacteriota
- Class: Halobacteria
- Order: Haloferacales
- Family: Haloferacaceae
- Genus: Haloferax
- Species: H. larsenii

Binomial name
- Haloferax larsenii Xue-Wei Xu et al. 2007

Species of archaeon

Haloferax larsenii is a gram-negative, aerobic, neutrophilic, extremely halophilic archaeon. It was named in honor of Professor Helge Larsen, who pioneered research on halophiles.

== Discovery ==
Haloferax larsenii was isolated from a solar saltern in the Zhoushan archipelago, Zhejiang Province, China. The researchers who discovered this species isolated three strains of H. larsenii. When this species was discovered, the genus Haloferax comprised Haloferax volcanii, H. mediterranei, H. denitrificans, H. gibbonsii, H. alexandrinus, H. lucentense, and H. sulfurifontis. Since this time, H. prahovense, H. elongans, and H. mucosum have been discovered, which totals to 11 species in the genus.

== Diversity ==
Like most species in Haloferax, H. larsenii was isolated from an extremely salty environment consisting of a mixture of mud and brine.

=== Phylogenetic position ===
The species has been placed in a phylogeny:

- - Haloferax elongans
  - Haloferax larsenii
- - Haloferax sulfurifontis
  - - Haloferax mucosum
    - - Haloferax prahovense
      - - - Haloferax gibbonsii
          - Haloferax lucentensis
        - - Haloferax denitrificans
          - - Haloferax volcanii
            - - Haloferax alexandrinus

== Characteristics ==
Cells of H. larsenii are extremely pleomorphic and irregularly shaped with a diameter of 0.8-1.5 μm. Motility of cells has been noted, but flagella have not been observed by electron microscopy. The major polar lipids are the C_{20}C_{20} derivatives of phosphatidylglycerol, phosphatidylglycerol phosphate methyl ester, diglycosyl glycerol diether, and sulfated diglycosyl diether. The DNA G+C content of DNA of the ZJ206^{T} strain is 62.2±0.8 mol% as determined by thermal denaturation.

When grown on complex agar medium, colonies appeared orange-red, smooth, circular, elevated, and 1–2 mm in diameter. Colonies can grow with NaCl concentrations of 1.0-4.8 M, with optimum growth between 2.2 and 3.4 M. However, saturated NaCl inhibits growth in liquid medium. The optimum pH for growth is 6.5-7.0 and the optimum temperature for growth is 42-45 °C. Anaerobic growth occurs on nitrate with the production of gas; nitrate is reduced to nitrite.

Glucose, glycerol, mannose, starch, maltose, sucrose, glutamate, alanine, ornithine, fumarate, malate, pyruvate, succinate, and lactate substrates support growth. Growth is not sustained on arabinose, lactose, mannitol, rhamnose, sorbitol, galactose, ribose, xylose, arginine, lysine, aspartate, glycine, acetate, propionate, and citrate.

Sensitivity to novobiocin, bacitracin, anisomycin, aphidicolin, and rifampicin have been observed. However, no sensitivity has been shown to ampicillin, penicillin, chloramphenicol, erythromycin, neomycin, nalidixic acid, nystatin, tetracycline, streptomycin, or kanamycin.

Furthermore, H. larsenii was shown to form indole, hydrolyze gelatin, starch, and Tweens 40 and 80; produce acid from glycerol, maltose, glucose, fructose, and sucrose; and form H_{2}S from thiosulfate.
