= Halorubrum vacuolatum =

Scientific classification
- Domain: Archaea
- Kingdom: Methanobacteriati
- Phylum: Methanobacteriota
- Class: Halobacteria
- Order: Haloferacales
- Family: Halorubraceae
- Genus: Halorubrum
- Species: H. vacuolatum

Binomial name
- Halorubrum vacuolatum (Mwatha and Grant 1993) Kamekura et al. 1997

Synonyms
- Natronobacterium vacuolatum Mwatha and Grant 1993

Species of haloarchaeon

Halorubrum vacuolatum is an extremely halophilic archaeon in the genus Halorubrum that was originally isolated from Lake Magadi in Kenya. It inhabits hypersaline environments and is commonly found in alkaline habitats such as salt lakes and soda lakes.

== Overview ==
Halorubrum vacuolatum is an extreme halophile adapted to environments with high salt concentrations and often alkaline conditions. As a member of the haloarchaea, it is able to survive extreme osmotic stress through specialized adaptations.

Like other species in the genus Halorubrum, it is an aerobic heterotroph that utilizes organic compounds for growth. Cells have been observed to contain gas vesicles. Gas vesicles help the cell remain buoyant and regulate its position in the water column.

Research on H. vacuolatum and related haloarchaea has contributed to understanding microbial adaptation to extreme environments and has potential applications in biotechnology, particularly due to the stability of enzymes under high-salt conditions.

== Scientific classification ==
Halorubrum vacuolatum is classified within the domain Archaea, phylum Euryarchaeota, class Halobacteria, order Haloferacales, family Halorubraceae, and genus Halorubrum.

Members of the family Halorubraceae are distinguished from other haloarchaea based on their placement in phylogenetic trees and shared molecular features identified through genomic analysis. This family comprises a group of extremely halophilic archaea and includes related genera such as Halobaculum, Halohasta, Halolamina, and Halonotius, which share evolutionary relationships within the order Haloferacales.

Members of this taxonomic group belong to haloarchaea adapted to life in hypersaline environments. These organisms are commonly found in habitats such as salt lakes and solar salterns, where they play a significant role in microbial communities at high salt concentrations and share physiological adaptations that enable them to maintain osmotic balance and cellular function under extreme salinity.

== Morphology ==
Halorubrum vacuolatum is a halophilic archaeon that exhibits morphological characteristics typical of members of the genus Halorubrum. Cells are short rod-shaped during exponential growth and become spherical in the stationary phase.

Cells of H. vacuolatum have been observed to contain large gas vesicles. These structures allow cells to remain suspended and regulate their position in the water column.

Colonies of haloarchaea, including species of Halorubrum, are often pigmented, which can give them a red or pink coloration. These pigments can protect cells from ultraviolet radiation and oxidative damage.

Like other haloarchaea, H. vacuolatum maintains cellular stability in high-salt conditions through adaptations to osmotic stress.

== Discovery and classification ==
=== Initial discovery ===
Halorubrum vacuolatum was originally isolated from Lake Magadi in Kenya, a hypersaline and alkaline soda lake in the East African Rift Valley. The organism was first described as Natronobacterium vacuolatum based on its physiological and morphological characteristics, including its haloalkaliphilic nature, bright pink pigmentation, and the presence of gas vesicles.

The species was identified as a member of a group of haloalkaliphilic archaea adapted to environments with both high salinity and high pH, such as soda lakes. Early classification of such organisms relied primarily on phenotypic characteristics, including morphology, biochemical properties, and membrane lipid composition.

=== Reclassification ===
Subsequent phylogenetic analysis, particularly comparisons of 16S ribosomal RNA gene sequences, demonstrated that Natronobacterium vacuolatum is more closely related to members of the genus Halorubrum than to other species of Natronobacterium. These analyses, based on phylogenetic tree reconstruction and sequence similarity, provide the primary method for determining evolutionary relationships among haloarchaea.

Phylogenetic tree reconstruction and sequence comparisons showed that the species clustered with members of Halorubrum, supporting its transfer to that genus. As a result, Kamekura and colleagues proposed reclassification of the species as Halorubrum vacuolatum. This analysis indicates that Halorubrum vacuolatum is most closely related to other species within the genus Halorubrum, as determined by 16S rRNA-based phylogenetic analysis.

== Growth conditions ==
Halorubrum vacuolatum is an extremely haloalkaliphilic archaeon that requires high salinity and alkaline conditions for growth, consistent with its original isolation from Lake Magadi, a hypersaline soda lake in the Kenyan Rift Valley. Like other members of the genus Halorubrum, it thrives in environments with NaCl concentrations exceeding 2 M, where optimal growth often occurs at salinities approaching saturation. These organisms employ a “salt-in” osmoadaptation strategy, maintaining high intracellular concentrations of potassium and chloride ions to balance external osmotic pressure and stabilize cellular proteins. Additionally, H. vacuolatum's growth has been observed in mesophilic temperature ranges similar to other Halorubrum species, typically between 30°C and 45°C. As an aerobic heterotroph, H. vacuolatum relies on organic substrates for growth. Like other members of the genus Halorubrum, H. vacuolatum can utilize a variety of carbon sources, although growth rates may vary depending on the availability and composition of surrounding nutrients.

In addition to osmotic stress, hypersaline environments expose cells to high levels of solar radiation and low oxygen solubility. As a haloarchaeon, H. vacuolatum has evolved multiple adaptations to tolerate these conditions, including highly acidic proteins and gas vesicles that provide buoyancy in stratified water columns. These physiological traits enable H. vacuolatum to thrive in extreme environments that would otherwise be inhospitable to most other microorganisms.

== Genome and sequencing information ==
Genomic information for H. vacuolatum remains limited relative to other members of the genus, as current knowledge is based on a draft genome assembly of the type strain (H. vacuolatum DSM 8800) and ribosomal RNA gene sequences available in public databases. However, the classification of H. vacuolatum is strongly supported by comparative analysis of 16S rRNA gene sequences, which places the species within the genus Halorubrum. Analysis of 16S rRNA gene sequences led to the reclassification of H. vacuolatum from its original classification as Natronobacterium vacuolatum, as phylogenetic and phenotypic analyses demonstrated a closer evolutionary relationship with haloarchaeal taxa in the genus Halorubrum. Like other haloarchaea, ribosomal gene sequencing remains the primary molecular marker for archaeal systematics and the identification and classification of H. vacuolatum, given the relative scarcity of whole genome sequencing for this species.

Other comparative genomics studies of Halorubrum species provide additional context for interpreting the genome of H. vacuolatum. Since members of the genus exhibit substantial genetic diversity, including variation in gene content associated with metabolic pathways, genome analyses suggest that H. vacuolatum likely undergoes frequent genetic recombination and possesses flexible accessory genomes that may contribute to its adaptation to hypersaline environments. However, given that the genome of H. vacuolatum is represented primarily by a draft assembly at this moment, additional sequencing efforts will be required to fully characterize its genomic features and strain-specific adaptations.

== Metabolism ==
Like other members of the genus Halorubrum and related haloarchaea, H. vacuolatum is an aerobic heterotroph. As such, species within this group utilize a variety of organic compounds, including amino acids, sugars, and other low-molecular-weight substrates, as carbon and energy sources. Similar to how genomic and sequencing information for H. vacuolatum is limited, direct metabolic studies of H. vacuolatum are also scarce, but comparative analyses show that Halorubrum species exhibit variability in metabolic pathways, including differences in carbon, nitrogen, and sulfur metabolism, suggesting metabolic flexibility within the genus. This flexibility enables H. vacuolatum to adapt to fluctuating nutrient conditions in hypersaline environments like Lake Magadi.

In addition to heterotrophy, haloarchaea can supplement their energy production through light-driven processes, as many species possess retinal-based proton pumps, such as bacteriorhodopsin, that generate a proton motive force used for ATP synthesis. This form of phototrophy does not involve carbon fixation but could enhance energy efficiency under nutrient-limited conditions. Haloarchaea also play important roles in biogeochemical cycling within hypersaline ecosystems. Members of the genus Halorubrum exhibit metabolic capabilities associated with carbon, nitrogen, and sulfur transformations, contributing to nutrient turnover in saline environments. The metabolic activity of H. vacuolatum is shaped by environmental stressors, which select for specialized enzymes and physiological adaptations that maintain cellular function under extreme conditions. Although these systems have not been directly confirmed in H. vacuolatum, their widespread occurrence among haloarchaea and Halorubrum species suggests they may contribute to its metabolic characteristics.

== Ecology ==
Halorubrum vacuolatum inhabits hypersaline and alkaline conditions found in environments like soda lakes. This is consistent with its original isolation from Lake Magadi, Kenya. These environments are characterized by high salt concentrations, elevated pH, intense solar radiation, and low nutrient availability, conditions that strongly limit biodiversity and favor the dominance of extremophilic microorganisms. Within such ecosystems, haloarchaea, including members of the genus Halorubrum, often constitute a significant proportion of the microbial community and contribute to the overall structure and function of hypersaline habitats.

In these environments, Halorubrum species function primarily as aerobic heterotrophs and play a role in the degradation of organic matter and recycling of carbon within microbial communities and nutrient cycling processes. Comparative studies also suggest that members of the genus contribute to nitrogen and sulfur cycling through diverse metabolic pathways, supporting ecosystem-level nutrient turnover. Hypersaline ecosystems commonly include other halophilic organisms such as algae (e.g., Dunaliella), and additional archaeal taxa, forming complex microbial consortia in which metabolic byproducts are exchanged among community members. Nevertheless, the ecological success of H. vacuolatum is supported by physiological adaptations that enable it to interact effectively with its environment. Some species, including H. vacuolatum, form gas vesicles that confer buoyancy, enabling cells to position themselves within stratified water columns to optimize access to light and oxygen. These adaptations, together with tolerance to extreme salinity and alkalinity, allow H. vacuolatum to persist in ecological niches that are inhospitable to most other microorganisms.

== Significance ==
Halorubrum vacuolatum and related haloarchaea are important model organisms for understanding how life can survive under extreme environmental conditions. These microorganisms inhabit hypersaline environments such as salt lakes and solar salterns, where salt concentrations far exceed those tolerated by most life forms. Studying their adaptations provides insight into mechanisms of cellular stability, protein function, and osmotic balance under extreme stress.

Gas vesicles found in some haloarchaea, including H. vacuolatum, provide buoyancy that allows cells to position themselves optimally within the water column. These structures have attracted interest for their potential applications in biomedical imaging and biotechnology.

Studying H. vacuolatum contributes to understanding the molecular and physiological adaptations that enable microorganisms to survive in extreme environments.
