= Halorubrum ezzemoulense =

Scientific classification
- Domain: Archaea
- Kingdom: Methanobacteriati
- Phylum: Methanobacteriota
- Class: Halobacteria
- Order: Haloferacales
- Family: Halorubraceae
- Genus: Halorubrum
- Species: H. ezzemoulense

Binomial name
- Halorubrum ezzemoulense Kharroub et al. 2006

Type strain
- 5'1 = DSM 17463 = CECT 7099

Synonyms
- Halorubrum chaoviator Mancinelli et al. 2009

Species of Halobacteria

Halorubrum ezzemoulense is a motile, gram-negative staining species of halophilic archaeon within the genus Halorubrum, known for its ability to thrive in hypersaline, or extremely salty, environments such as salt lakes and sabkhas. Originally isolated from the Ezzemoul salt lake in Algeria, it is adapted to extreme conditions, requiring high concentrations of salt for growth and survival.

== Taxonomy ==
Halorubrum is a genus of halophilic archaea within the family Halorubraceae, under the class Halobacteria. Members of this genus are among the most prominent and well-studied microorganisms in hypersaline environments.

=== Phylogenetic relatedness ===
Based on 16S rRNA gene sequence analysis, which identifies an organism by comparing a specific part its genetic code to other microbes, Halorubrum ezzemoulense is most closely related to Halorubrum chaoviator, sharing a 99.7% sequence identity. Multilocus sequence analysis (MLSA), a method to examine nucleotide differences, revealed > 98% sequence similarity among the two and eight additional Halorubrum species isolated from hypersaline environments in Iran and Namibia. These strains formed a monophyletic clade, meaning they share a common ancestor, in evolutionary trees using computational methods like neighbor-joining and maximum likelihood, showing they share a close relationship within the Halorubrum genus.

Due to their high genetic similarity, H. chaoviator was reclassified as a synonym of H. ezzemoulense, which retains naming priority. This reclassification was supported by multiple lines of evidence, including similarities in polar lipid (fat-like) composition, genome-based clustering for grouping sequence relatedness, and digital DNA–DNA hybridization (dDDH), a method to determine genetic relatedness by measuring how well strands of DNA from different organisms bind to each other. OrthoANI, a metric to calculate Average Nucleotide Identity (ANI) values and genome distance, ranged from 97.9% to 99.4%, and dDDH values ranged from 74.2% to 95.0%, both above the commonly accepted species thresholds of 95% for ANI and 70% for dDDH. These demonstrated insufficient divergence to consider them separate species.

The second closest relative is Halorubrum sodomense, based on the Halorubrum phylogenic tree. H. sodomense was first isolated from the Dead Sea and described by Oren in 1983. Exact OrthoANI and dDDH values between H. ezzemoulense and H. sodomense have not been specified, but they are lower than the species-level thresholds and thus, remain distinct species.

== Discovery and isolation ==
Halorubrum ezzemoulense was first isolated in 2006 by Kharroub and colleagues from a water sample collected from the hypersaline Ezzemoul sabkha in northeastern Algeria during a study of salt-adapted microbes. The researchers cultured samples using specialized high-salt media that mimicked the organism's natural environment and favored the growth of salt-loving archaea. Colonies were obtained through serial dilution and plating techniques, a standard method for isolating pure microbial strains. Among the isolated strains, one—designated 5.1^{T} (CECT 7099^{T} = DSM 17463^{T})—showed distinct genetic and physiological characteristics that led to its identification as a new species within the genus Halorubrum.

Halorubrum ezzemoulense was first isolated in 2006 by Kharroub and colleagues from a water sample collected from the hypersaline Ezzemoul sabkha in northeastern Algeria during a study of salt-adapted microbes. Colonies were obtained through serial dilution and plating, a standard method for isolating pure microbial strains. Among the isolated strains, one—designated 5.1^{T} (CECT 7099^{T} = DSM 17463^{T})—showed distinct genetic and physiological characteristics, leading to its identification as a new species within the genus Halorubrum.

H. ezzemoulense was officially described in 2006 by Kharroub et al., who performed various tests to confirm its uniqueness. These included analyzing its cell shape, salt tolerance, pigmentation, and its genetic makeup using 16S rRNA gene sequencing. Since then, H. ezzemoulense has been included in comparative genetic studies alongside other Halorubrum species isolated from similar saline environments.

== Morphology ==
Halorubrum ezzemoulense cells are gram-negative and rod-shaped, which is typical for many haloarchaea. These cells are motile due to the presence of their flagella, a tail-like feature in organisms that allows for motility. They form no spores, meaning they do not produce dormant, highly resistant structures for surviving extreme conditions—a usual trait in some bacteria but generally absent in archaea. Colonies on high-salt media are small and appear as short rods or ovoid forms, usually 1.5-3.0 μm in length and approximately 0.6 μm in diameter. These cells often occur separately or in irregular clusters; some may form short chains or aggregates of cells in culture. Their colonial pigmentation is reddish due to the production of carotenoid pigments (e.g., bacterioruberin) common in Halorubrum and other Haloarchaea.

== Physiology ==
Halorubrum ezzemoulense is an extreme halophile, requiring high concentrations of sodium chloride for optimal growth. Its optimum growth is in environments containing approximately 20% NaCl, though it can tolerate concentrations ranging from 15% to nearly 25%. This reliance on salt accurately reflects its natural habitat in saturated brines. However, they can also be isolated from environments with moderate salt concentrations to prevent the cells from lysing, or rupturing, from osmotic stress. Magnesium ions (Mg2+) are additionally required for growth to help stabilize cell structures in extreme salinity.

The optimum growth range for H. ezzemoulense is at 37-40 °C with moderate temperature growth. This organism is strictly anaerobic, meaning it relies on oxygen for respiration and does not grow anaerobically. It thrives at a neutral pH and can grow between pH 6.5-9.0, with favorable growth conditions at around pH 7.0-7.5. In accordance with its aerobic metabolism, it checks for the oxidase and catalase enzymes, which assist in detoxifying oxygen byproducts.

== Genomics ==
Halorubrum ezzemoulense has a multipartite, or segmented, genome made up of one main circular chromosome and two plasmids, which are smaller, extrachromosomal pieces of DNA. The main chromosome is approximately 3.1 megabases (Mb) long with a high G+C content of 68.46%, helping maintain DNA stability in high-salt environments. The organism also carries a large "megaplasmid" of about 606 kilobases (kbp) with 57.36% G+C content, and a smaller plasmid around 57 kbp with 54.66% G+C content. The total genome size is approximately 3.7 Mb, with an average G+C content of 61.9%.

=== Sequencing ===
The genome of strain Fb21, a representative of H. ezzemoulense isolated from an Iranian salt flat, was sequenced using Illumina MiSeq technology, a method known as whole-genome shotgun sequencing that reads and reassembles DNA fragments into full genome. The genome was then analyzed and annotated using the NCBI Prokaryotic Genome Annotation Pipeline (PGAP), which helps identify genes and their functions. This analysis predicted 3,443 protein-coding genes and 78 RNA genes. To better understand what these genes do, scientists used tools called Protein family (Pfam) and TIGRFAMs, which group proteins into families based on their structure and function.

=== KEGG Pathways ===
According to the Kyoto Encyclopedia of Genes and Genomes (KEGG), H. ezzemoulense is capable of performing glycolysis (breaking down sugars for energy), the tricarboxylic acid (TCA) cycle (or Krebs cycle), and the production of nucleotides and amino acids. The enzymes involved in oxidative phosphorylation and electron transport to produce energy using oxygen are consistent with its obligate aerobic nature.

== Ecology ==
The sabkha environment, characterized by extreme salinity, high solar radiation, and frequent desiccation, is representative of the specialized ecological niches inhabited by haloarchaea of the Halorubrum genus. Samples are typically collected from salt crust and brine at the surface of the lakebed, where organisms such as Halorubrum ezzemoulense dominate microbial populations due to their high salt tolerance.

The ability of H. ezzemoulense to produce bacterioruberin protects cells against oxidative stress and ultraviolet radiation. This pigmentation is ecologically significant since it contributes to the reddish hues often observed in hypersaline environments, such as in surface salt ponds during periods of high microbial activity.

Metabolic characteristics of H. ezzemoulense indicate a strictly aerobic chemoorganotrophic lifestyle. In other words, it requires oxygen to grow and relies on amino acids and other organic compounds for carbon and energy. Its ability to survive in very salty concentrations suggests it is well-adapted to habitats like salterns and salt lakes. Related Halorubrum species, such as Halorubrum lacusprofundi, have been found globally in various salty environments, including salt mines, saline soils, and solar salterns in Africa, Asia, Antarctica, and North America. These findings support the hypothesis that members of this genus, including H. ezzemoulense, are important contributors to microbial diversity and nutrient cycles of extreme saline ecosystems.

== Significance and applications ==
As an extremophile, Halorubrum ezzemoulense is a valuable model organism for studying microbial adaptation, resilience, and biodiversity. Like other salt-loving archaea, the cellular physiology of H. ezzemoulense, including its salt-in strategy for osmoregulation to keep cells stable in salty environments, acidic protein surfaces, and very stable membrane lipids, contributes to broader understanding of protein folding and enzyme activity under extreme ionic stress.

H. ezzemoulense also has implications for evolutionary biology. Extremophilic archaea are considered among the earliest life forms on Earth and are hypothesized to resemble organisms that existed near the last universal common ancestor (LUCA). Scientists can thus gather traits of ancient microbial life to better understand early biochemical pathways by examining metabolic features of halophiles.

In astrobiology, H. ezzemoulense is of interest due to its ability to survive in conditions similar to those found on Mars or Europa, where brine-like, subsurface water is thought to exist. These findings support hypotheses that life could exist in extra-terrestrial environments high salinity, radiation, and dryness. The production of the bacterioruberin pigment further suggests that these organisms could act as agents in life-detection models for space missions.

Moreover, H. ezzemoulense belongs to a group of archaea known to produce other special enzymes, called extremozymes, that are active in high-salt or high-temperature industrial processes. These enzymes are being explored for use in pharmaceuticals, saline wastewater treatment, food preservation, and bioplastic production. Recent reviews also highlight the emerging use of halophiles and thermophiles, organisms that survive in high temperatures, in the synthesis of polyhydroxyalkanoates (PHAs), which are biodegradable polymers that may help replace petrochemical plastics in various industries.

The genes of H. ezzemoulense may help scientists develop strains with resistance to oxidative stress and toxic compounds, making it a candidate for synthetic biology and developing industrial strains. Its genetics could also contribute to understanding microbial resilience, which is important for biotechnology and public health in the face of climate change and expanding saline environments.
