= Zodletone Mountain =

Mountain in Oklahoma, United States

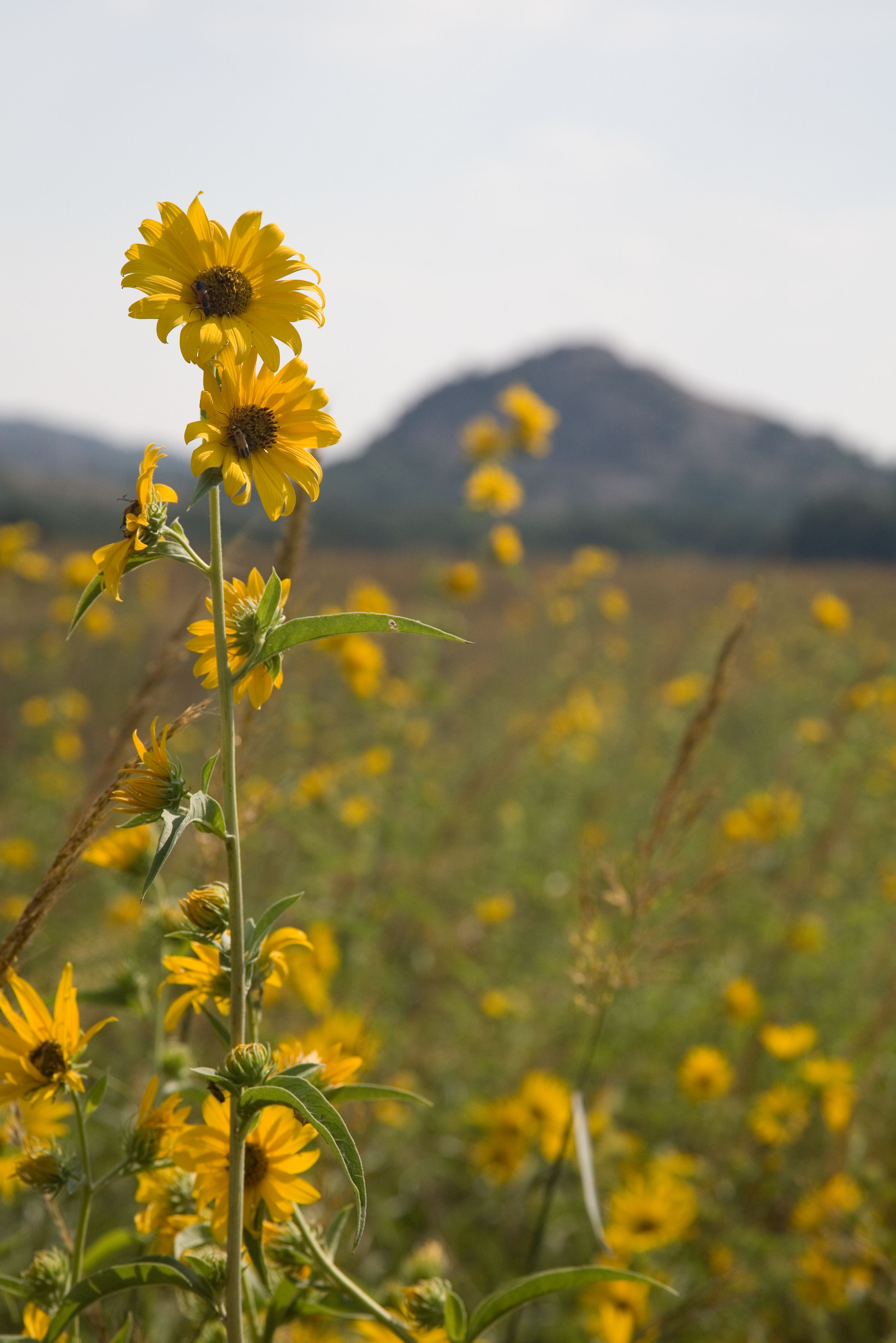
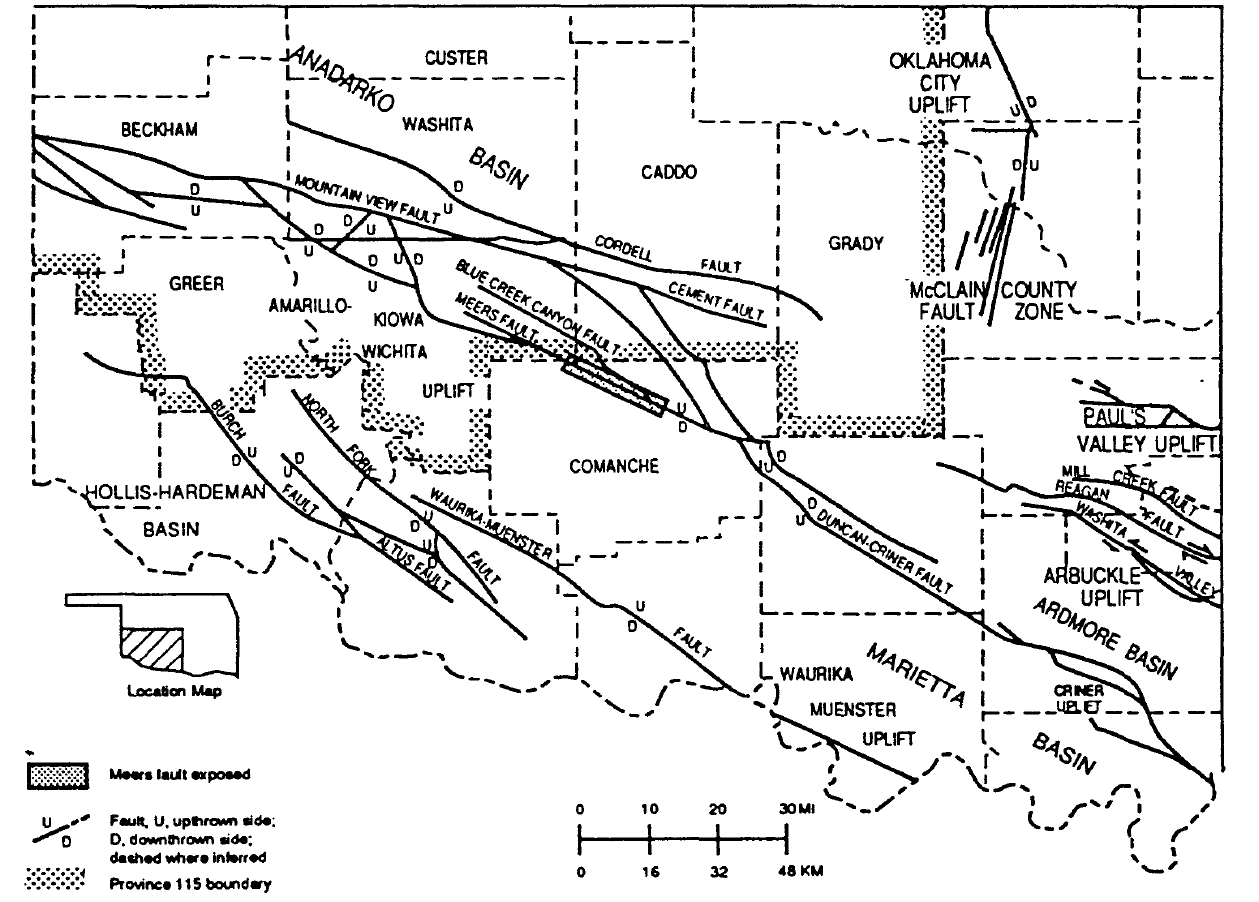
- Wichita Mountains Byway – View of Mount Zodletone from the southwest Map of the elevation displacements in the area of Wichita Mountains (in the south) / Anadarko Basin

Highest point
- Elevation: 499 m (1,637 ft) (236.22 ft over 1400.92 ft surrounding area)
- Isolation: 4.4 km → Bally Mountain
- Coordinates: 34°59′44″N 98°41′20″W

Geography
- Location within Oklahoma
- Location: Kiowa County, Oklahoma, United States
- Parent range: Slick Hills Range

Zodletone Mountain (with spelling variant Zadletone Mountain, occasionally also called Mount Zodletone) is a mountain in the United States. It is located in western Kiowa County just west of neighboring Caddo County in the southwestern part of the state of Oklahoma (about 120 miles from Oklahoma City). On the northern slope of the mountain is the sulfide-rich and strictly anaerobic artesian Zodletone Spring with a National Science Foundation (NSF) microbial observatory.

== Description ==
Zodletone Mountain rises approximately 500 meters (or 1640 feet) above sea level and 75 meters (or 229 feet) above the surrounding terrain. (Note: Topographic determination from DEM 3" data from Viewfinder Panoramas.) At its base, the mountain is approximately 1.9 kilometers (or 1.18 miles) wide. (Note: The largest extension of the contour around the topographical highlighting.) Located in the Anadarko Basin, the land surrounding Zodletone Mountain is predominantly flat. (Note: Determined from the intersection of all elevation data(DEM 3") of Viewfinder panoramas within a 10-kilometer radius.) As a result, the mountain is a prominent feature in the landscape. It is nearly entirely encircled by grassland and several lakes are situated in the region. (Note: According to GeoNames within a radius of 20 kilometers, compared to the average density of lakes on Earth.) Zodletone Mountain is the northernmost link of the Slick Hills Range. The highest point in the area is Bally Mountain, which stands at 1866.8 feet above sea level and is located 2.73 miles south of Mount Zodletone. (Note: The point that is highest above the local horizon according to the elevation data from GeoNames.) The population density of Zodletone Mountain is very low, with only about 2 inhabitants per square kilometer (247.105 acres). The ZIP Code delivery area is OK 73062. The nearest major city, Carnegie, is located 8.88 miles northeast of Zodletone Mountain.

=== Climate ===
The climate in this region is humid and subtropical, with an average temperature of 18 °C/64.4 °F. The hottest month is July, with 32 °C/89.6 °F average, while the coldest is January, with an average temperature of 2 °C/35.6 °F. The average annual rainfall is 783 millimeters/30.826 inches, with the wettest month being April, with 104 millimeters/4.094 inches of rain, and the driest being January, with only 25 millimeters/0.984-inch.

=== Directions ===
Follow Oklahoma 58 south of Carnegie for 6.83 miles. Then, turn west on a dirt road for 2.98 miles and continue south for about half a mile until you reach a white two-story farmhouse to obtain a visitor's permit (as of 1988).

== Zodletone Spring ==
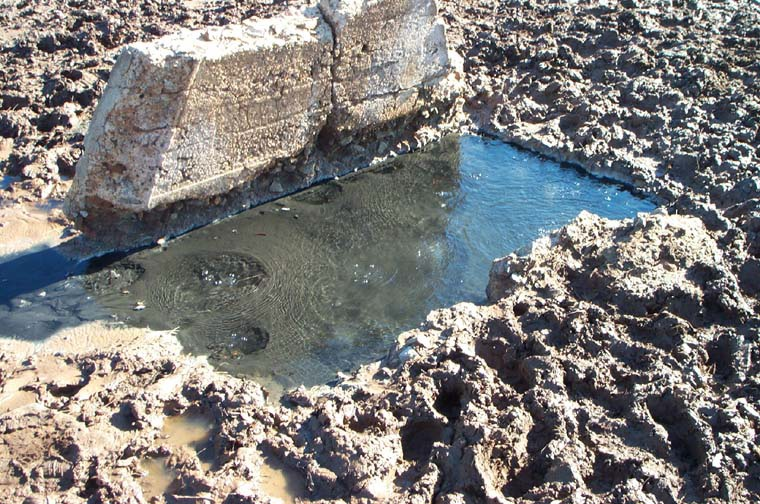
Zodleton Spring: sediments under the spring water

Located on the northern slope of Mount Zodletone, the Zodletone Spring is an artesian spring that features a National Science Foundation (NSF) microbial observatory. First described by Havens in 1983, the spring is a sulfide-rich and strictly anaerobic hydrocarbon seep that operates at low temperatures. The spring discharges approximately 2.11 gallons per minute over a distance of about 22 yards, where the water flows north over Stinking Creek into nearby Saddle Mountain Creek. The spring is a closed area of approximately 1 square meter filled with biomass and soft sediments to a depth of at least 6 inches. The spring water has a sulfide content of 8–10 mmol/L and contains 1.0–1.5 mmol of zero valent sulfur. The salinity, measured by the concentration of sodium chloride, is around 0.7–1.0%, which is significantly less than seawater (approximately 3.5%). These measurements, in the mats formed by the microbes, increase to 2–5%, and in the soil they can reach up to 25–30% at a depth of 2 in and 12 in, respectively. The hydrocarbons detected in high concentrations are short-chain alkanes, such as methane, ethane, and propane.

Since 2001, a team of scientists from the University of Oklahoma (OU) and Oklahoma State University (OSU) has been researching the microbial community (microbiome) at the Zodletone spring.

This spring has attracted geologists and environmental microbiologists thanks to the high sulfide and methane content of the spring water, which creates a diverse microbial mat environment along its course down the mountain, displaying unique geochemical and microbial processes.

A list of the minerals encountered there can be found at mindat.org. This environment shares many similarities with the conditions that existed on Earth almost two billion years ago when there was no oxygen in the atmosphere, and methane was abundant. Frequent sulfur reactions were likely to have occurred. Therefore, the spring and spring stream ecosystem provides an opportunity to study the biology and geochemistry of early Earth. Therefore, the investigations focus on the role of microorganisms, particularly bacteria and archaea, in hydrocarbon (petroleum) and sulfur metabolism, as well as micro-eukaryotes (eukaryotic microbes such as protists and microfungi).

=== Bacteria ===
Both known and new groups of bacteria were identified in the sample. These groups include Chlorobia (green sulfur bacteria), Chloroflexi (green non-sulfur bacteria), Planctomycetes (with isolate Zi62), Cyanobacteria (specifically order Oscillatoria), Saccharibacteria (formerly known as TM7, here with extremely high diversity), Parcubacteria (also known as OD1, with isolate ZFos45e05), the Microgenomates group (OP11), and Absconditabacteria (SR1). In addition, new bacterial phyla, Candidate division CSSED10-310 (provisional name), with its species Candidate division CSSED10-310 bacterium, and Ca. Krumholzibacteriota, with its species Ca. K. zodletonense, were found in the spring.

=== Archaea ===
Among the Archaea, Crenarchaeota were found in addition to an unexpected occurrence of Halobacteria (Euryarchaeota) in several places in spring, despite the fact that the water salinity is too low for them (although not in the mats and soil, as seen above). The following were identified:

- the genera Haloferax (with species H. sulfurifontis) and Halogranum from the order Haloferacales;
- the genera Haladaptatus (with species H. paucihalophilus) and Halosarcina from the order Halobacteriales.

Another archaeal group found at Zodleton Spring is that of the Asgard archaea, including:

- AMARA-1 sp016933055 (GTDB) with Ca. Lokiarchaeota archaeon isolate Zod_Metabat.1044 (NCBI);
- Ca. Thorarchaeota archaeon isolate Zod_maxbin.0292; MAG: Candidatus Krumholzibacterium zodletonense isolate 171, whole genome shotgun sequencing project;
- Ca. Heimdallarchaeota archaeon isolate Zod_Metabat.460.

Asgard archaea, particularly the Heimdall archaea, are considered potential candidates for illustrating the origin in the evolution of complex cellular organisms, or eukaryotes, in a process known as eukaryogenesis.

=== Protists and microfungi ===
The study unequivocally identified several protist groups, such as Cercozoa, Alveolata, and Stramenopile, among the microbial eukaryotes. The majority of the stramenopiles were classified as either belonging to the genus Cafeteria (order Bicosoecida) or the order Labyrinthulida (mucilages), despite their previous association with marine habitats.

The majority of the fungal sequences observed belong to ascomycete yeasts of the Saccharomycetales order or are closely related to basidiomycete yeasts from the Tremellales order. In addition, they found sequences from one of the Ustilaginomycetes (fire fungi) and a new group of fungi provisionally designated as LKM (also known as Zeuk1), named after the strain LKM11 from Lac Pavin (France).

=== Viruses ===
As of mid-January 2023, research on the Viruses in the Zodletone Spring ecosystem is still limited. However, the RNA sequence EMS013, which possibly belongs to the genus Cystovirus, along with two other examples, suggest the presence of RNA bacteriophages. The presence of protists from the genus Cafeteria suggests the possibility of the presence of accompanying viruses, such as the DNA giant virus Cafeteria roenbergensis virus (CroV).

== Bibliography ==
- Donovan, R. N.; Younger, P.; Ditzell, C. (1988), "Some aspects of the geology of Zodletone Mountain, southwestern Oklahoma", Centennial Field Guide Volume 4: South-Central Section of the Geological Society of America, vol. 4, Geological Society of America, pp. 99–102, doi:10.1130/0-8137-5404-6.99, ISBN 0-8137-5404-6.
- Elshahed, Mostafa S.; Senko, John M.; Najar, Fares Z.; Kenton, Stephen M.; Roe, Bruce A.; Dewers, Thomas A.; Spear, John R.; Krumholz, Lee R. (September 2003). "Bacterial Diversity and Sulfur Cycling in a Mesophilic Sulfide-Rich Spring". Applied and Environmental Microbiology. 69 (9): 5609–5621. doi:10.1128/AEM.69.9.5609-5621.2003.
- Elshahed, Mostafa S.; Youssef, Noha H.; Luo, Qingwei; Najar, Fares Z.; Roe, Bruce A.; Sisk, Tracy M.; Bühring, Solveig I.; Hinrichs, Kai-Uwe; Krumholz, Lee R. (August 2007). "Phylogenetic and Metabolic Diversity of Planctomycetes from Anaerobic, Sulfide- and Sulfur-Rich Zodletone Spring, Oklahoma". Applied and Environmental Microbiology. 73 (15): 4707–4716. doi:10.1128/AEM.00591-07.
- Hahn, C. Ryan; Farag, Ibrahim F.; Murphy, Chelsea L.; Podar, Mircea; Elshahed, Mostafa S.; Youssef, Noha H. (2022-04-26). Sousa, Filipa L.; Schleper, Christa M. (eds.). "Microbial Diversity and Sulfur Cycling in an Early Earth Analogue: From Ancient Novelty to Modern Commonality". mBio. 13 (2). doi:10.1128/mbio.00016-22.
- Krishnamurthy, Siddharth R.; Janowski, Andrew B.; Zhao, Guoyan; Barouch, Dan; Wang, David (24 March 2016). "Hyperexpansion of RNA Bacteriophage Diversity". PLOS Biology. 14 (3): e1002409. doi:10.1371/journal.pbio.1002409.
- Luo, Qingwei; Krumholz, Lee R.; Najar, Fares Z.; Peacock, Aaron D.; Roe, Bruce A.; White, David C.; Elshahed, Mostafa S. (October 2005). "Diversity of the Microeukaryotic Community in Sulfide-Rich Zodletone Spring (Oklahoma)". Applied and Environmental Microbiology. 71 (10): 6175–6184. doi:10.1128/AEM.71.10.6175-6184.2005. ISSN 0099-2240.
- Lynch, Erin A.; Langille, Morgan G. I.; Darling, Aaron; Wilbanks, Elizabeth G.; Haltiner, Caitlin; Shao, Katie S. Y.; Starr, Michael O.; Teiling, Clotilde; Harkins, Timothy T.; Edwards, Robert A.; Eisen, Jonathan A.; Facciotti, Marc T. (2012-07-24). "Sequencing of Seven Haloarchaeal Genomes Reveals Patterns of Genomic Flux". PLOS ONE. 7 (7): e41389. doi:10.1371/journal.pone.0041389. ISSN 1932-6203.
- Savage, Kristen N.; Krumholz, Lee R.; Gieg, Lisa M.; Parisi, Victoria A.; Suflita, Joseph M.; Allen, Jon; Philp, R. Paul; Elshahed, Mostafa S. (2010-03-19). "Biodegradation of low-molecular-weight alkanes under mesophilic, sulfate-reducing conditions: metabolic intermediates and community patterns: n-Propane and n-pentane degradation by sulfate reducers". FEMS Microbiology Ecology. 72 (3): 485–495. doi:10.1111/j.1574-6941.2010.00866.x.
- Spain, Anne M.; Elshahed, Mostafa S.; Najar, Fares Z.; Krumholz, Lee R. (2015-09-22). "Metatranscriptomic analysis of a high-sulfide aquatic spring reveals insights into sulfur cycling and unexpected aerobic metabolism". PeerJ. 3: e1259. doi:10.7717/peerj.1259. ISSN 2167-8359.
- Yadav, Archana; Hahn, C. Ryan; S. Elshahed, Mostafa; H. Youssefa, Noha (1 July 2021). "Five Metagenome-Assembled Genomes of the Rare Phylum CSSED10-310 from Zodletone Spring (Oklahoma, USA)". Microbiology Resource Announcement. 10 (26).
