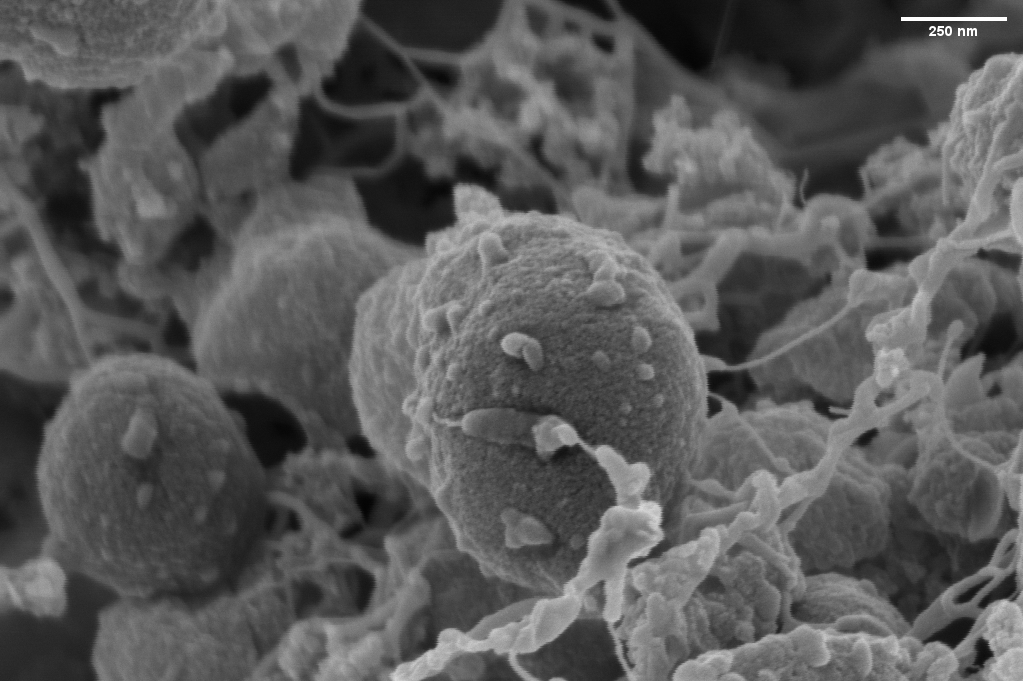
- SEM image of Haloferax mediterranei.

Scientific classification
- Domain: Archaea
- Kingdom: Methanobacteriati
- Phylum: Methanobacteriota
- Class: Halobacteria
- Order: Haloferacales
- Family: Haloferacaceae
- Genus: Haloferax
- Species: H. mediterranei

Binomial name
- Haloferax mediterranei (Rodriguez-Valera et al. 1983) Torreblanca et al. 1987

Synonyms
- Halobacterium mediterranei Rodriguez-Valera et al. 1983

= Haloferax mediterranei =

Species of bacterium

Haloferax mediterranei is a species of archaea in the family Haloferacaceae.

== Discovery ==
Haloferax mediterranei was discovered in 1983 in marine salterns in the village of Santa Pola, Spain. The species was initially named Halobacterium mediterranei, then renamed Haloferax mediterranei in 1986. Haloferax mediterranei is the fastest-growing known member of the Halobacteriales under optimal laboratory conditions, but it is relatively rare in the environment. The full genome of H. mediterranei was sequenced in 2012.

== Metabolism and Growth Conditions ==
Haloferax mediterranei is the fastest-growing archaeon in the Halobacteriales family, with generation times as low as 1.2 hours reported under optimal laboratory growth conditions. Haloferax mediterranei is able to use a variety of compounds as carbon and energy sources, and can accumulate materials to serve as a source of carbon and energy, as well as use organic and inorganic nitrogen sources. H. mediterranei is an extremely versatile microorganism that can anaerobically or aerobically, tolerate a wide range of salinities (between 10% and 32.5%), a wide range of pH values (between 5.75 and 8.75) and a wide range of temperatures (between 18 and 55 °C). It can also tolerate a variety of high metal concentrations, such as nickel, lithium, cobalt and arsenic, which are toxic to most organisms.

== Morphology and Cell Division ==
Haloferax mediterranei is an extremely pleomorphic organism, cells are usually flat disks. Like Haloferax volcanii, it performs cell division through the formation of an FtsZ ring.

== Biofilm and Exopolysaccharide formation ==
Haloferax mediterranei produces a mucous exopolysaccharide matrix that accumulates as a top layer in liquid medium. This is a widespread strategy in the microbial world that helps biofilms adhere to surfaces, as well as protects cells from pH and temperature variations and radiation. These exopolysaccharides have been studied as potential emulsifiers for industry. The unshaken biofilms of H. mediterranei in liquid cultures rapidly rearrange into a honeycomb formation pattern upon exposure to air, a phenomenon that has yet to be fully elucidated.

== PHA and PHB synthesis ==
H. mediterranei, when grown under phosphate limitation, produces polyhydroxyalkanoates, a type of biodegradable thermoplastic currently commercially produced using bacteria. It has been suggested that H. mediterranei is a good candidate for industrial production of biodegradable thermoplastics due to its fast growth, low contamination rates and ease of lysis. Deleting the genes responsible for exopolysaccharide synthesis results in a 20% increase in the amount of PHAs in the cell. Increasing the salt concentration of the media also increased the concentration of PHAs produced.

== Gas Vesicles ==
Like some other members of the Halobacteriales group, notably Halobacterium salinarum, Haloferax mediterranei produces gas vesicles, believed to act aiding buoyancy. The production of gas vesicles only occurs in high salt concentrations and once cells have reached stationary phase. By transforming 14 genes from the vac cluster of H. mediterranei into a gas-vesicle deficient archaeon H. volcanii, researchers found that H. volcanii is able to produce functional gas vacuoles.
