= Carol Litchfield =

American microbiologist (1936–2012)

Carol D. Litchfield
- Born: Carol Ann Darlene Ross; October 10, 1936; Cincinnati, Ohio
- Died: April 3, 2012 (aged 75); Arlington County, Virginia
- Education: University of Cincinnati (BS, MS); Texas A&M University (PhD)
- Spouse: Charles Carter Litchfield (m. 1960; died 2007)
- Scientific career
- Workplaces: Bangor University; Rutgers University; George Mason University

Carol Ann Darlene Litchfield (née Ross; October 10, 1936 – April 3, 2012) was an American microbiologist whose research focused on extremophile organisms, specifically halophiles. Carol Litchfield joined George Mason University's biology department in 1993, and was a research professor at the Department of Environmental Science and Policy from 2005 and 2010.

== Early life and education ==
Litchfield was born to Donald and Melba Ross on October 10, 1936. An avid fan of the Cincinnati Reds baseball team, Litchfield played softball throughout her childhood. She attended the University of Cincinnati, earning her Bachelor of Science in medical technology and Master of Science in microbiology.

After a few years of working as a research scientist at Texas A&M University, Litchfield enrolled in the university's organic chemistry PhD program. At that time, women were only allowed to attend Texas A&M if they were the wife of a student or employee, so she relied on her husband's employment in the biology department. Litchfield completed her postdoctoral studies in marine science at Bangor University.

== Academic career ==
After completing her postdoctoral research, Litchfield and her husband began teaching at Rutgers University. While Charles specialized in the soluble oils of marine mammals, Carol worked on oceanographic microbiology. During this period, Litchfield served on the New Jersey Governor's Panel on Coastal Waters. Litchfield and her post-doctoral student Russel Vreeland discovered the halophilic bacterial genus Halomonas in 1980 during a sampling trip in Bonaire. Among their isolates, they characterized the species Halomonas elongata, which has become the model organism for researching moderate halophiles.

After ten years of teaching at Rutgers, Litchfield began working in DuPont's environmental toxicology laboratories and founded Microbial Solutions, her consulting company for industrial microbiology. Recognizing her work on bioremediation, Litchfield was named to the US Department of Energy's Environmental Biotechnology Working Group in 1989.

In 1993, Litchfield joined the Department of Biology of George Mason University, later transitioning into its Department of Environmental Science and Policy.

== Honors and awards ==
From 2017 to 2018, Litchfield served as President of the Society of Industrial Microbiology and Biotechnology (SIMB), which awarded her its Charles Porter Prize in 2012. At its annual conference, SIMB organizes the Carol D. Litchfield Best Student Oral and Poster Presentation Awards in her memory. Her longtime collaborator, Mike Dyall-Smith, named a newly discovered halophilic bacterial species Halohasta litchfieldiae in her honor, as this bacteria was discovered in the salty waters of the Deep Lake in Vestfold Hills of Antarctica.

== Personal life ==
Upon her official retirement from George Mason University in 2008, Litchfield donated her collection of microbiology texts to the university. In her free time, Litchfield studied the history of salt, which she frequently presented at Society of Industrial Archaeology conferences.

Litchfield married biologist Charles Carter Litchfield in 1960, who died in 2007. In February 2012, Litchfield was diagnosed with pancreatic cancer, and on April 3, 2012, Litchfield died in her home in Arlington County, Virginia. In accordance with her wishes, her ashes, Cincinnati Reds visor, and "SALT BUG" vanity license plate were used to construct two pods that would support coral reef recovery. One pod was deployed off the southeastern coast of Florida, while the other was deposited in the Great Salt Lake of Utah.
