= Halorubrum salsolis =

Scientific classification
- Domain: Archaea
- Kingdom: Methanobacteriati
- Phylum: Methanobacteriota
- Class: Halobacteria
- Order: Haloferacales
- Family: Halorubraceae
- Genus: Halorubrum
- Species: H. salsolis

Binomial name
- Halorubrum salsolis

Species of archaeon

"Halorubrum salsolis" is an undescribed species of halobacteria which is known to live in the Great Salt Lake in the United States.

The microbe was named by two children who took part in a naming contest held by the discoverers of the organism in 2006; the children independently suggested salsolis as the species name for the microbe.

This halophilic extremophile lives in water 10 times saltier than the ocean. It contains carotenoids that make it resistant to ultraviolet rays.
