= Halorubrum alkaliphilum =

Scientific classification
- Domain: Archaea
- Kingdom: Methanobacteriati
- Phylum: Methanobacteriota
- Class: Halobacteria
- Order: Haloferacales
- Family: Halorubraceae
- Genus: Halorubrum
- Species: H. alkaliphilum

Binomial name
- Halorubrum alkaliphilum Feng et al. 2005

Synonyms
- Halorubrum novitatis

Species of archaeon

Halorubrum alkaliphilum is a halophilic Archaeon in the family of Halorubraceae.
