= Halorubrum distributum =

Scientific classification
- Domain: Archaea
- Kingdom: Methanobacteriati
- Phylum: Methanobacteriota
- Class: Halobacteria
- Order: Haloferacales
- Family: Halorubraceae
- Genus: Halorubrum
- Species: H. distributum

Binomial name
- Halorubrum distributum (Zvyagintseva and Tarasov 1989) Oren and Ventosa 1996

Synonyms
- Halobacterium distributum Zvyagintseva and Tarasov 1989; Halobacterium distributus (spelling variant); Halorubrobacterium distributum (Zvyagintseva and Tarasov 1989) Kamekura and Dyall-Smith 1996; Halorubrum arcis Xu et al. 2007; Halorubrum fuqingense; Halorubrum litoreum Cui et al. 2007; Halorubrum terrestre Ventosa et al. 2004

Species of archaeon

Halorubrum distributum is a halophilic Archaeon in the family of Halorubraceae.
