= H. californiensis =

H. californiensis may refer to:

- Halorubrum californiensis, a bacterium species in the genus Halorubrum
- Hesperodiaptomus californiensis, a crustacean species endemic to northern California
- Hypselodoris californiensis, the California blue dorid, a colourful sea slug species

== See also ==
- List of Latin and Greek words commonly used in systematic names § C
