= Halorubrum kocurii =

Scientific classification
- Domain: Archaea
- Kingdom: Methanobacteriati
- Phylum: Methanobacteriota
- Class: Halobacteria
- Order: Haloferacales
- Family: Halorubraceae
- Genus: Halorubrum
- Species: H. kocurii

Binomial name
- Halorubrum kocurii Gutiérrez et al., 2008

Halophilic archaean in the genus Halorubrum

Halorubrum kocurii is a halophilic archaean belonging to the genus Halorubrum. This genus contains a total of thirty-seven different species, all of which thrive in high-salinity environments. Archaea belonging to this genus are typically found in hypersaline environments due to their halophilic nature, specifically in solar salterns. Halorubrum kocurii is a rod-shaped, Gram-negative archaeon. Different from its closest relatives, Halorubrum kocurii is non-motile and contains no flagella or cilia. This archaeon thrives at high pH levels, high salt concentrations, and moderate temperatures. It has a number of close relatives, including Halorubrum aidingense, Halorubrum lacusprofundi, and more.

== Discovery ==
Halorubrum kocurii was first discovered in 2003 by M.C. Gutierrez and their team. Their aim was to isolate a halophilic archaeon that had not yet been identified. To do so, a sample was taken from the saline lake Lake Bagaejinnor in Inner Mongolia, China, in September of 2003. The sample was serially diluted and plated on plates with various mediums, including NaCl, MgCl₂, NaBr, etc. Eventually, a pure culture of the strain BG-1 (Halorubrum kocurri) was obtained and used for testing under which conditions the strain would see optimal growth. The researchers phenotypically characterized the strain following the guidelines of the minimal standards for the description of novel organisms in the order Halobacteriales. These guidelines were developed by researchers Oren, Ventosa, and Grant in 1997 and include tests of motility, morphological classification, nitrate reduction, starch hydrolysis, and more. Gutierrez and their team performed these tests on the BG-1 strain and its closest relatives in order to compare the results and determine the validity of Halorubrum kocurri as its own species.

== Taxonomy ==
Halorubrum kocurii belongs to the domain Archaea, the kingdom Euryarchaeota, the phylum Euryarchaeota, the class Halobacteria, the order Haloferacales, the family Halorubraceae, the genus Halorubrum, and the species Halorubrum kocurii. The Halorubrum genus currently consists of thirty-seven different species, making it the largest genus belonging to the Halobacteria class. Species belonging to this genus are typically rod-shaped and Gram-negative, and all species are aerobic chemoorganotrophs with some being motile. These microbes tend to be red or orange in color due to the abundance of bacterioruberin carotenoids found within them, but some are observed to be colorless. All species belonging to the genus Halorubrum are extremely halophilic and thrive best in environments with a concentration of NaCl between 1.0 and 5.2 M, but these microbes can grow at a variety of pH levels, with the genus containing both neutrophilic and alkaliphilic species. Through 16s rRNA sequencing, Halorubrum kocurii has been documented to have many close relatives, including Halorubrum aidingense, Halorubrum saccharovorum, Halorubrum lacusprofundi, and Halorubrum lipolyticum.

== Relatives ==
The closest relative of Halorubrum kocurii is Halorubrum aidingense with 98.8% genetic similarity. This organism was discovered in a saline lake called Aiding Lake in Xinjiang, China. This organism is rod-shaped, Gram-negative, and motile. It grows optimally at temperatures between 40 °C (104 °F) and 42 °C (108 °F), a pH level of 7.5, and a salt concentration of 15.2%. Halorubrum saccharovorum is an organism that is closely related to Halorubrum kocurii with a genetic similarity of 98.6%. This organism produces nitrite from nitrate without the production of gas. It is motile and grows optimally at a temperature of 50 °C (122 °F). The next closest relative of Halorubrum kocurri is Halorubrum lacusprofundi with a genetic similarity of 98.6%. This archaeon was isolated from Deep Lake in Antarctica and is extremely halophilic. The organism is unlike some in its genus due to its categorization as a haloalkaliphile and not a neutrophile. Furthermore, this archaeon is considered special due to its ability to grow at low temperatures. The next closest relative of Halorubrum kocurii is an archaeon called Halorubrum lipolyticum. This halophilic archaeon was first isolated from Aiby Salt Lake in Xinjiang, China. This organism is rod-shaped, motile, and Gram-negative, and has been known to have the ability to hydrolyze lipids. This archaeon grows optimally at NaCl concentrations of 1.7 to 4.8 M and temperatures between 45 °C (113 °F) and 48 °C (118 °F).

== Physiology ==
Halorubrum kocurii is a flat, rod-shaped halophile with an average length between 2–5 μm (7.9×10^{−5}–0.000197 in) and a width between .9–1.1 μm (3.5×10^{−5}–4.3×10^{−5} in). Halorubrum requires a high pH at around 6.0–9.0 and a hypersaline environment at 2.5–3.4 M NaCl for sustained growth. To adapt to a high salt concentration, Halorubrum kocurii contains high amounts of polar lipids in its membrane structure. This also provides heat protection for Halorubrum kocurii, which are found to grow in a range from 22–55 °C (72–131 °F). Halorubrum kocurii also requires an aerobic environment and is capable of aerobic respiration by oxidizing organic compounds for energy. Halorubrum kocurii is highly non-motile and contains no flagella or motor structures. Halorubrum kocurii can produce pigment in response to using oxidase for aerobic metabolism. Halorubrum kocurii also uses enzymes to protect itself from its hypersaline environment. Halorubrum kocurii uses catalase to break down hydrogen peroxide and urease to break down ammonia.

== Genomics ==
The entire genome of Halorubrum kocurii has not been sequenced. From 16s rRNA gene sequencing, Halorubrum kocurii was found to be evolutionary close to other Halorubrum species. From DNA–DNA hybridization studies, Halorubrum kocurii also contained high DNA–DNA similarity to these species: Halorubrum aidingense, Halorubrum lacusprofundi, and Halorubrum lipolyticum. The genomic DNA of Halorubrum kocurii contains 69.4% guanine and cytosine content. Halorubrum kocurii's high GC (guanine and cystone)-content protects them against hypersaline solutions.

== Metabolism ==
Halorubrum kocurii is a chemoorganotroph and uses organic compounds for energy and carbon sources. These compounds include simple sugars and amino acids. Halorubrum kocurii also conducts aerobic respiration by using oxygen in its electron transport chain to produce ATP. Halorubrum kocurii is capable of using urease to break down urea into ammonia and carbon dioxide for nitrogen sources. Halorubrum kocurii can also break down hydrogen peroxide and other highly reactive oxygen species using catalase.

== Biotechnological application ==
Halorubrum kocurii has the potential to be adopted into many industrial applications, including the food and pharmaceutical industries. Halorubrum kocurii's ability to produce oxidase, catalase, and urease can be used to stabilize and extend the shelf life of many products. Halorubrum kocurii's enzymes is capable of degrading pollutants. Halorubrum kocurii also has a high tolerance to temperatures, pH, and salt concentrations. Halorubrum kocurii has the potential to work as fertilizers and stimulants for growth in saline agriculture environments.
