= Halobaculum gomorrense =

Scientific classification
- Domain: Archaea
- Kingdom: Methanobacteriati
- Phylum: Methanobacteriota
- Class: Halobacteria
- Order: Haloferacales
- Family: Halorubraceae
- Genus: Halobaculum
- Species: H. gomorrense

Binomial name
- Halobaculum gomorrense Oren et al. 1995

Type strain
- ATCC 700876; DS2807; DSM 9297; JCM 9908

Species of archaeon

Halobaculum gomorrense is a rod-shaped extremely halophilic archaeon first isolated from the Dead Sea.
