= Haloferax chudinovii =

Scientific classification
- Domain: Archaea
- Kingdom: Methanobacteriati
- Phylum: Methanobacteriota
- Class: Halobacteria
- Order: Haloferacales
- Family: Haloferacaceae
- Genus: Haloferax
- Species: H. chudinovii

Binomial name
- Haloferax chudinovii Saralov et al. 2013

Species of bacterium

Haloferax chudinovii is a species of archaea in the family Haloferacaceae. The species was described in 2013.
