= Haloferax lucentense =

Scientific classification
- Domain: Archaea
- Kingdom: Methanobacteriati
- Phylum: Halobacteriota
- Class: Halobacteria
- Order: Haloferacales
- Family: Haloferacaceae
- Genus: Haloferax
- Species: H. lucentense

Binomial name
- Haloferax lucentense Gutierrez et al. 2004

Synonyms
- Haloferax alicantei (Holmes et al. 1997, not validly published); Haloferax lucentense (misspelling)

Species of archaea

Haloferax lucentense is a halophilic archaeon in the family of Haloferacaceae.
