= Halorubrum coriense =

Scientific classification
- Domain: Archaea
- Kingdom: Methanobacteriati
- Phylum: Methanobacteriota
- Class: Halobacteria
- Order: Haloferacales
- Family: Halorubraceae
- Genus: Halorubrum
- Species: H. coriense

Binomial name
- Halorubrum coriense (Kamekura and Dyall-Smith 1996) Oren and Ventosa 1996

Synonyms
- Halorubrobacterium coriense Kamekura and Dyall-Smith 1996; Halorubrobacterium coriensis (orthographic variant)

Species of archaeon

Halorubrum coriense is a halophilic Archaeon in the family of Halorubraceae.
