= Haloferax denitrificans =

Scientific classification
- Domain: Archaea
- Kingdom: Methanobacteriati
- Phylum: Methanobacteriota
- Class: Halobacteria
- Order: Haloferacales
- Family: Haloferacaceae
- Genus: Haloferax
- Species: H. denitrificans

Binomial name
- Haloferax denitrificans (Tomlinson et al. 1986) Tindall et al. 1989

Synonyms
- Halobacterium denitrificans Tomlinson et al. 1986

Species of bacterium

Haloferax denitrificans is a species of archaea in the family Haloferacaceae.
