= Halorubrum californiense =

Scientific classification
- Domain: Archaea
- Kingdom: Methanobacteriati
- Phylum: Methanobacteriota
- Class: Halobacteria
- Order: Haloferacales
- Family: Halorubraceae
- Genus: Halorubrum
- Species: H. californiense

Binomial name
- Halorubrum californiense Pesenti et al. 2008

Type strain
- CECT 7256; DSM 19288; JCM 14715; SF3-213

Synonyms
- Halorubrum californiensis (orthographic variant); Halorubrum crystallum

Species of archaeon

Halorubrum californiense is a halophilic Archaeon in the family of Halorubraceae. It was isolated from saline environments solar saltern in Newark, California.
