= Halorubrum orientale =

Scientific classification
- Domain: Archaea
- Kingdom: Methanobacteriati
- Phylum: Methanobacteriota
- Class: Halobacteria
- Order: Haloferacales
- Family: Halorubraceae
- Genus: Halorubrum
- Species: H. orientale

Binomial name
- Halorubrum orientale Castillo et al. 2006

Synonyms
- Halorubrum orientalis (orthographic variant)

Species of archaeon

Halorubrum orientale is a halophilic Archaeon in the family of Halorubraceae.
