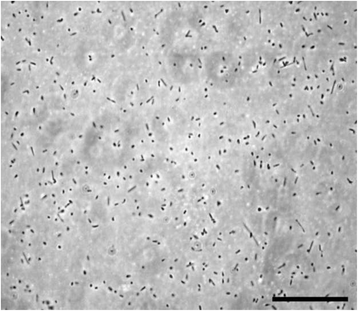
- Halorubrum lacusprofundi

Scientific classification
- Domain: Archaea
- Kingdom: Methanobacteriati
- Phylum: Methanobacteriota
- Class: Halobacteria
- Order: Haloferacales
- Family: Halorubraceae
- Genus: Halorubrum; McGenity and Grant 1996

Type species
- Halorubrum saccharovorum (Tomlinson & Hochstein 1977) McGenity & Grant 1996

Species
- See text

Synonyms
- Halorubrobacterium Kamekura and Dyall-Smith 1996

= Halorubrum =

Genus of archaea

Halorubrum is a genus of archaea in the family Halorubraceae. Halorubrum species are usually halophilic and can be found in waters with high salt concentration such as the Dead Sea or Lake Zabuye.

== Genetic exchange ==
A population of the haloarchaea Halorubrum in its natural high salt concentration environment exchanged genetic information frequently by recombination. This population exhibited a degree of linkage equilibrium approaching that of a sexual population.

== Species ==
Halorubrum ejinorense was first isolated from Lake Ejinor in Inner Mongolia, China.

Halorubrum lacusprofundi was first isolated in the 1980s from Deep Lake, Antarctica. Its genome, sequenced in 2008, consists of two chromosomes (one 2.74 Mb and the other 0.53 Mb) and one plasmid (0.43 Mb). Its β-galactosidase enzyme has been extensively studied to understand how proteins function in low-temperature, high-saline environments. One strain of H. lacusprofundi contains a plasmid for horizontal gene transfer, which takes place via a mechanism that uses vesicle-enclosed virus-like particles.

Halorubrum sodomense was first identified in the Dead Sea in 1980. It requires a higher concentration of Mg^{2+} ions for growth than related halophiles. Its cell surface membrane contains Archaerhodopsin-3 (AR3), a photoreceptor protein which harvests the energy from sunlight to establish a proton motive force that is used for ATP synthesis. Mutants of AR3 are widely used as tools in optogenetics for neuroscience research.

Halorubrum tibetense was first isolated from Lake Zabuye in Tibet, China.

Halorubrum xinjiangense was first isolated from Xiao-Er-Kule Lake in Xinjiang, China.

Proposed species

Several species and novel binomial names have been proposed, but not validly published. published.

- "Halorubrum africanae" Kharroub et al. 2007b and "Halorubrum constantinense" Kharroub et al. 2007b were isolated in Algeria and proposed as new species in 2007 and 2005.
- "Halorubrum alimentarium" Nam et al. 2008 nom. nud. and "Halorubrum koreense" Nam et al. 2008 nom. nud. are the proposed names for the undescribed strains B43 and B6, appearing in a publication of 2008.
- "Halorubrum halotolerans" Sabet et al. 2009 is the proposed name for an undescribed strain isolated from solar salterns in Baja California in 2009.
- Halorubrum hochstenium is the proposed name for the full genome of the undescribed strain ATCC 700873, supplied to databases in 2014.
- "Halorubrum jeotgali" Roh et al. 2007b was isolated from samples of traditional Korean seafood and proposed as new species in 2007. Halorubrum cibarium was proposed in the same publication. It was proposed again under the name H. cibi and accepted in 2009.
- "Halorubrum kribbense" Nkamga, Henrissat & Drancourt 2017 and "Halorubrum norisence" Nkamga, Henrissat & Drancourt 2017 are proposed names of unisolated strains from the human gut microbiome, referenced in a publication in 2017.
- H. miltondacostae Albuquerque et al. 2025
- "Halorubrum salipaludis" Gong et al. 2021 was first published in 2021.
- "Halorubrum salsolis"
- Halorubrum salsamenti was isolated from salt brine and proposed as new species in 2017.
- "Halorubrum sfaxense" Trigui et al. 2011 was isolated in Tunisia and proposed as new species in 2017.
- "Halorubrum tropicale" was isolated in Puerto Rico and proposed as new species in 2016.

=== Phylogeny ===
The currently accepted taxonomy is based on the List of Prokaryotic names with Standing in Nomenclature (LPSN) and National Center for Biotechnology Information (NCBI).

16S rRNA based LTP_07_2026

- Halorubrum
  - - - H. vacuolatum (Mwatha & Grant 1993) Kamekura et al. 1997
      - - H. gandharaense Kondô et al. 2015
        - H. luteum Hu et al. 2008
    - - - H. alkaliphilum Feng et al. 2005
        - H. tibetense Fan et al. 2004
      - - H. glutamatedens Xu et al. 2019
        - - H. aquaticum Gutierrez et al. 2011
          - - H. aethiopicum Gibtan et al. 2018
            - - H. rubrum Qiu et al. 2014
              - - H. cibi Roh & Bae 2009
                - H. halodurans Corral et al. 2016
  - - - H. distributum (Zvyagintseva & Tarasov 1989) Oren & Ventosa 1996
      - - H. ejinorense Castillo et al. 2007
        - - H. tebenquichense Lizama et al. 2002
          - - H. hochsteinianum Vreeland et al. 2024
            - - - H. salinarum Han et al. 2022
                - H. xinjiangense Feng et al. 2004
              - - H. coriense (Kamekura & Dyall-Smith 1996) Oren & Ventosa 1996
                - - H. ezzemoulense Kharroub et al. 2006
                  - - - H. miltondacostae Albuquerque et al. 2025
                      - H. sodomense (Oren 1983) McGenity & Grant 1996
                    - - H. californiense Pesenti et al. 2008
                      - H. trapanicum (Petter 1931) McGenity & Grant 1996
    - - - H. amylolyticum Sun et al. 2019
        - - H. persicum Corral et al. 2015
          - H. saccharovorum (Tomlinson & Hochstein 1977) McGenity & Grant 1996
      - - - H. pallidum Chen et al. 2016
          - - H. laminariae Han & Cui 2015
            - H. salinum Zhang & Cui 2014
        - - H. lipolyticum Cui et al. 2006
          - - - H. kocurii Gutierrez et al. 2008
              - - H. lacusprofundi (Franzmann et al. 1989) McGenity & Grant 1996
                - H. salsamenti Chen et al. 2019
            - - H. halophilum Yim et al. 2014
              - - - H. orientale Castillo et al. 2006
                  - H. trueperi Chen et al. 2017
                - - H. aidingense Cui et al. 2006
                  - - H. yunnanense Chen et al. 2015
                    - - H. depositum Chen et al. 2019
                      - H. rutilum Yin et al. 2016

53 marker proteins based GTDB 11-RS232

- Halorubrum
  - H. vacuolatum
  - - - - H. alkaliphilum
        - H. tibetense
      - - - H. glutamatedens
          - - H. aquaticum
            - H. cibi
        - - H. halodurans
          - - H. aethiopicum
            - H. rubrum
    - - - - H. trapanicum
          - - H. hochsteinianum
            - H. tebenquichense
        - - - H. ejinorense
            - H. sodomense
          - - - H. californiense
              - - H. distributum
                - "H. ruber" Hwang et al. 2022
            - - - H. ezzemoulense
                - - H. coriense
                  - H. miltondacostae
              - - H. xinjiangense
                - - H. salinarum
                  - H. tropicale Sanchez-Nieves et al. 2016
      - - - H. laminariae
          - H. salinum
        - - - H. aidingense
            - - H. trueperi
              - - H. depositum
                - - H. rutilum
                  - H. yunnanense
          - - H. lacusprofundi
            - - - H. kocurii
                - H. lipolyticum
              - - - H. persicum
                  - H. salsamenti
                - - H. saccharovorum
                  - - "H. salipaludis" Gong et al. 2021
                    - - H. amylolyticum
                      - H. halophilum

== See also ==
- List of Archaea genera
