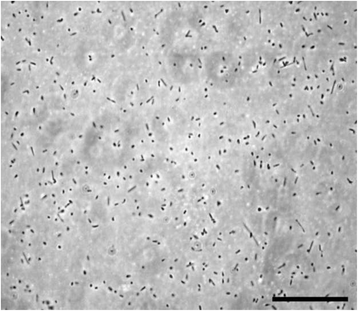

Scientific classification
- Domain: Archaea
- Kingdom: Methanobacteriati
- Phylum: Methanobacteriota
- Class: Halobacteria
- Order: Haloferacales
- Family: Halorubraceae
- Genus: Halorubrum
- Species: H. lacusprofundi

Binomial name
- Halorubrum lacusprofundi Franzmann et al. 1989

Synonyms
- Halobacterium lacusprofundi Franzmann et al. 1989

= Halorubrum lacusprofundi =

Species of archaeon

Halorubrum lacusprofundi is a rod-shaped, halophilic Archaeon in the family of Halorubraceae. It was first isolated from Deep Lake in Antarctica in the 1980s.

== Genome ==
Several strains of H. lacusprofundi have been discovered. The genome sequencing of the strain ACAM 32 was completed in 2008. The organism's genome consists of two circular chromosomes and a single circular plasmid. Chromosome I contains 2,735,295 base pairs encoding 2,801 genes and chromosome II contains 525,943 base pairs encoding 522 genes. The single plasmid contains 431,338 base pairs encoding 402 genes. At least one strain of H. lacusprofundi (R1S1) contains a plasmid (pR1SE) that enables horizontal gene transfer, which takes place via a mechanism that uses vesicle-enclosed virus-like particles.

== Research ==
Its β-galactosidase enzyme has been extensively studied to understand how proteins function in low-temperature, high-saline environments.
