= H. orientalis =

H. orientalis may refer to:

- Helleborus orientalis, a flowering plant species
- Heleophryne orientalis, the Eastern ghost frog, a frog species endemic to South Africa
- Huaxiagnathus orientalis, a theropod dinosaur species from the Lower Cretaceous of China
- Hyacinthus orientalis, the common hyacinth, garden hyacinth or Dutch hyacinth, a perennial flowering plant species native to southwestern Asia, in southern and central Turkey, northwestern Syria, Lebanon and northern Israel
- An orthographic variant of Halorubrum orientale, a halophilic archaeon.

== See also ==
- Orientalis (disambiguation)
