= Haloferax mucosum =

Scientific classification
- Domain: Archaea
- Kingdom: Methanobacteriati
- Phylum: Methanobacteriota
- Class: Halobacteria
- Order: Haloferacales
- Family: Haloferacaceae
- Genus: Haloferax
- Species: H. mucosum

Binomial name
- Haloferax mucosum (Allen et al. 2008)

Species of bacterium

Haloferax mucosum is a species of archaea in the family Haloferacaceae.
