= Lake Zabuye =

Zabuye Lake
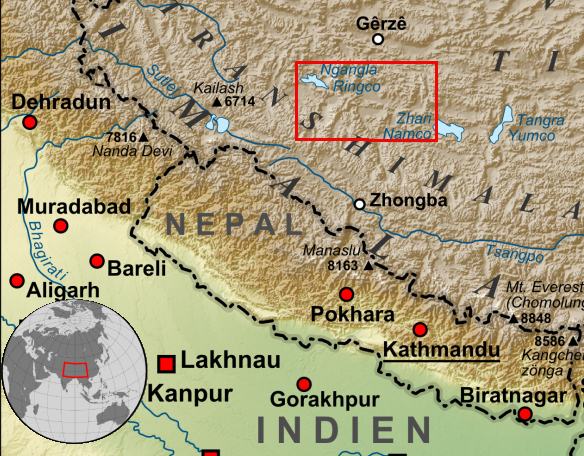

- Location within Tibet

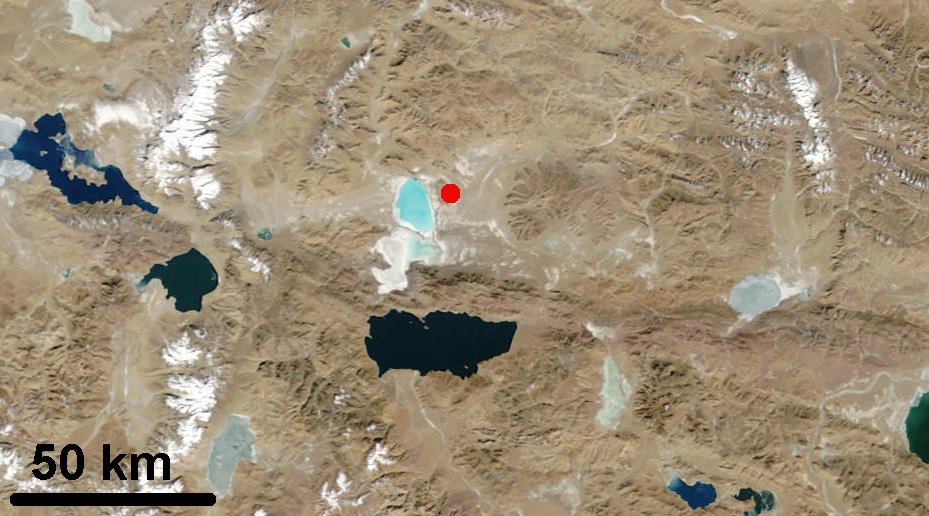
- The lake is marked with the red dot
- Location: Tibetan Plateau / Shigatse Prefecture
- Coordinates: 31°26′51″N 84°3′28″E
- Type: Cretaceous-Eocene, brine lake
- Primary inflows: From Rianglinag snow-covered mountains
- Primary outflows: Landlocked
- Basin countries: Tibet Autonomous Region, China
- Surface area: 247 km^{2} (100 sq mi)
- Average depth: 0.7 m (2.3 ft)
- Max. depth: 2.0 m (6.6 ft)
- Surface elevation: 4,421 m (14,505 ft)
- Islands: Two sub basins linked by a channel

Zabuye Lake is a hypersaline, landlocked soda lake located at an elevation of 4,400 metres (14,400 ft) in the Shigatse Prefecture of Tibet Autonomous Region, 1,050 km (650 mi) from Lhasa. The lake gives its name to the mineral zabuyelite (lithium carbonate, Li_{2}CO_{3}), which was discovered here in 1987 and has been mined since 2004–2005. In 2008, the salt mine at the lake was regarded as the major source of lithium in China.

== Etymology ==
The name of Zabuye Lake is also spelt as Drangyer, Zabayu, Zhabuye, Chabyêr or Chabyer, Tabie or Tchapia sometimes with an addition of "Tsaka" or "caka", which means "salt lake" in Tibetan.

== Geography and geology ==
The lake is located in the Gangdise Mountains (also known as the Lunggar Mountains) deep in the Tibetan Plateau. It is one of 251 salt lakes in Tibet. It is divided into the northern (98 km^{2}) and the southern (149 km^{2}) sub-basins, which are linked by a narrow channel. The southern part is semi-dry and appears white in satellite images. The northern part is fed from two inlets on east and on the west, by the snow melt of the Rianglinag Mountains (6,364 metres (20,879 ft)). The catchment area is 6,680 km^{2}, and the lake is surrounded by mountains with a height of 4,600–5,200 m above sea level. The lake is fed by rain, underground water and melting ice. Paleo-lake shore deposits in the area include sand banks, spits and barriers, and interbarrier lakes and lake shore deltas that form a cliff along the lake, in different tectonogeomorphological positions in the lake basin. This accumulation of sediments illustrates the dynamic nature of the lake system and its paleoclimatic characteristics.

Apart from lithium carbonate, the lake has high content of borax and also contains mirabilite and other alkali metal salts with a total content of 360–410 g/L. The approximate elemental concentrations in the brine in g/L are as follows: Na (160), K (60), Li (1.5), Rb (0.25), Cs (0.1), SO_{4} (20), CO_{3} (90), Cl (120), Br (3), I (0.02), B (3). The water density is about 1.4 g/cm^{3} and pH about 10. The lithium content, 1.53 g/L, nearly corresponds to the solubility limit of lithium carbonate in water and is second highest in the world.

The climate is very dry, with an annual precipitation of 199 mm (7.8 in) and evaporation of 2342 mm that has resulted in a gradual shrinking of the lake. The shrinking is revealed by terrace deposits above the present lake level. Up to 14 layers can be distinguished, but only the bottom seven have been evaluated with radiocarbon dating; their age increases from about 5,000 to 24,000 years from bottom to top. The layers from 10 to 14 rise above 4,600 meters and suggest that long ago, the lake was open and had a much larger area.

== Lithium production ==
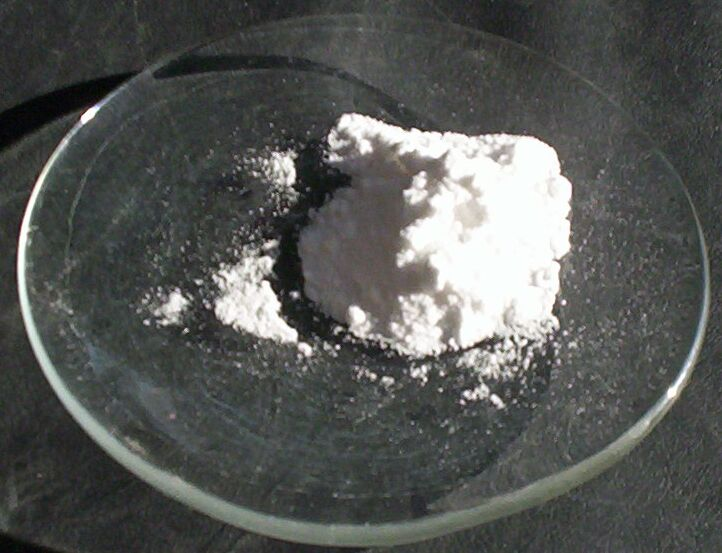
Lithium carbonate

The production of zabuyelite from the salt lake water began in 2004–2005, after exploration work for the mineral was initiated in 1982. In 1984, lithium was found in micro-fine sediments of the lake and considered amenable to refining in large quantities. Production started from a brine grading 0.12% Li. The company involved with the extraction, Zabuye (Shenzhen) Lithium Trading Co., Ltd., was established in 1999, employs 11–50 people and has the sales volumes of the order $10 million. It has a plant at the lake which had the total capacity of 5,000 tonnes and produced 1,556.5 tonnes of lithium carbonate in 2008. Its capacity was projected to increase to 20,000 tonnes in the near future. The company claims a reserve of 1.53 million tonnes Li (8.3 million tonnes of carbonate) but this estimate is considered as overly optimistic.

Tibet Mineral Development is investing CNY 1.084 billion to enhance production of lithium from Lake Zabuye. Under this project, the lake is expected to produce 20,000 tonnes of lithium salt, 5,000 tonnes of lithium chloride, 500 tonnes of lithium metal, 200 tonnes of high-purity lithium, 30 tonnes of lithium products and 490 tonnes of other lithium compounds per year. The anticipated annual revenue from this expansion is estimated to be CNY 639 million. In August 2021, the Tibet Mineral Development announced its intention to invest in the second phase of the Zabuye Salt Lake Green Comprehensive Development and Utilization Project, specifically the 10,000 Tons of Battery-grade Lithium Carbonate Project, with an expected investment of RMB 2 billion.
