= Haloferax elongans =

Scientific classification
- Domain: Archaea
- Kingdom: Methanobacteriati
- Phylum: Methanobacteriota
- Class: Halobacteria
- Order: Haloferacales
- Family: Haloferacaceae
- Genus: Haloferax
- Species: H. elongans

Binomial name
- Haloferax elongans (Allen et al. 2008)

Species of bacterium

Haloferax elongans is a species of archaea in the family Haloferacaceae.
