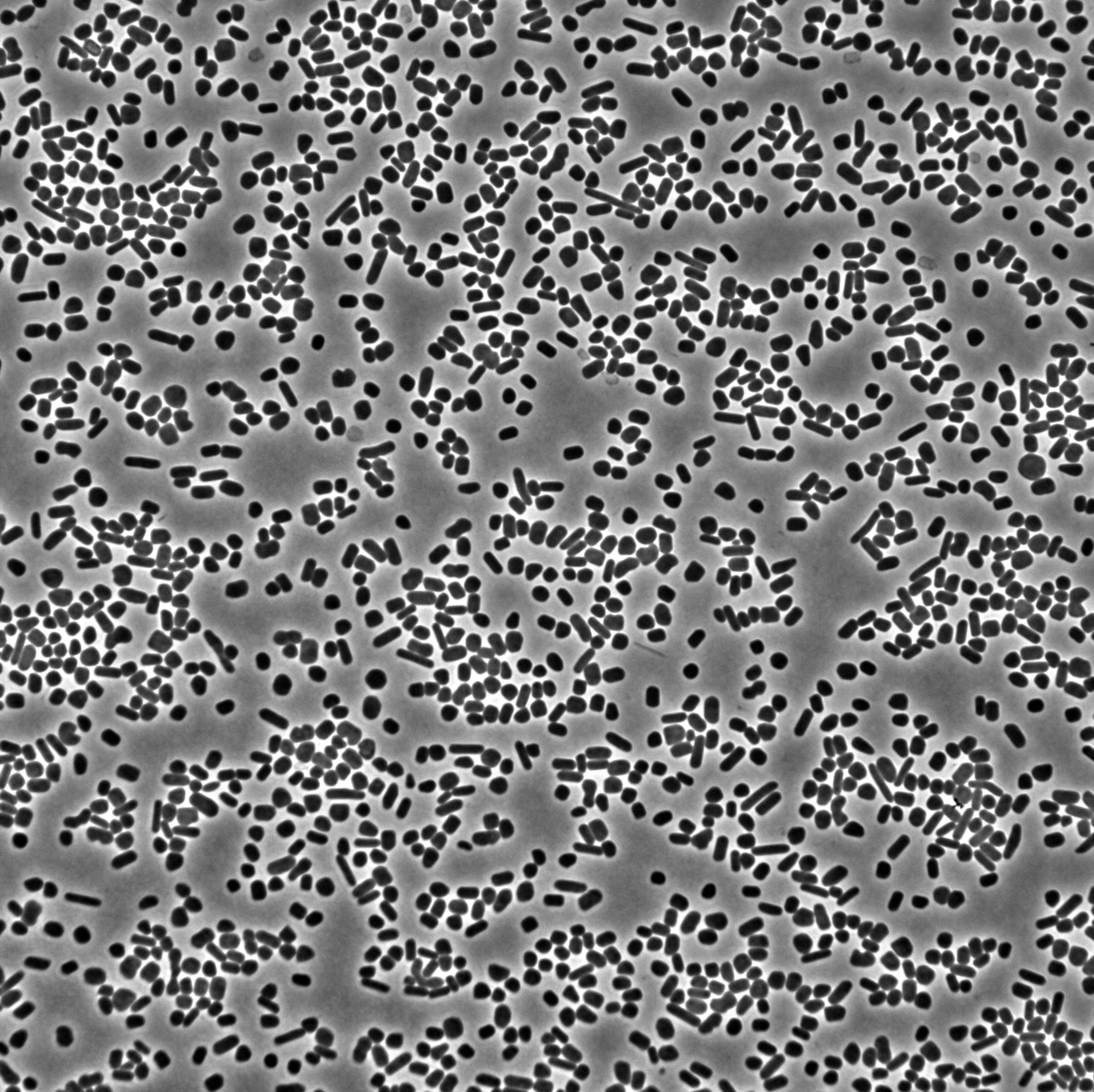
- A lab-grown culture of Haloferax volcanii imaged under an agarose pad using phase contrast microscopy

Scientific classification
- Domain: Archaea
- Kingdom: Methanobacteriati
- Phylum: Methanobacteriota
- Class: Halobacteria
- Order: Haloferacales
- Family: Haloferacaceae
- Genus: Haloferax
- Species: H. volcanii

Binomial name
- Haloferax volcanii (Mullakhanbhai and Larsen, 1975) Torreblanca et al., 1986

Synonyms
- Halobacterium volcanii Mullakhanbhai and Larsen, 1975

= Haloferax volcanii =

Species of Halobacteria

Haloferax volcanii is a species of archaean in the genus Haloferax in the Archaea.

== Description and significance ==
Haloferax volcanii is a halophilic mesophile archaeon that can be isolated from hypersaline environments such as: the Dead Sea, the Great Salt Lake, and oceanic environments with high sodium chloride concentrates. Haloferax volcanii is noteworthy because it can be cultured without much difficulty, rare for an extremophile. H. volcanii is chemoorganotrophic, metabolizing sugars as a carbon source. It is primarily aerobic, but is capable of anaerobic respiration under anoxic conditions. Recently an isolate of this species was studied by researchers at University of California, Berkeley, as part of a project on the survival of haloarchaea on Mars.

== Genome structure ==
The genome of H. volcanii consists of a large (4 Mb), multicopy chromosome and several megaplasmids. The complete genome of the wild-type strain of H. volcanii (DS2) consists of about 4130 genes.

The genome has been completely sequenced and a paper discussing it was published in 2010. The molecular biology of H. volcanii has been extensively studied for the last decade in order to discover more about DNA replication, DNA repair and RNA synthesis. The archaeal proteins used in these processes are extremely similar to Eukaryotic proteins and so are studied primarily as a model system for these organisms. H. volcanii undergoes prolific horizontal gene transfer through a mechanism of "mating"- cell fusion.

== Cell structure and metabolism ==
Reproduction among H. volcanii occurs asexually by binary fission. This practice is similar to that of other Archaea and, indeed, that of bacteria.

Like many archaea, H. volcanii cells have no cell wall and therefore are dependent on other mechanisms, such as their S-layer and cytoskeletal proteins, for structure. An individual H. volcanii archaeon can vary from 1-3 micrometers in diameter. They are pleomorphic, generally transitioning from motile, elongated rod shapes to stationary, biofilm-generating disk shapes as the culture ages. Additionally, biofilms generated by H. volcanii are capable of rapidly producing honeycomb patterns when exposed to changes in humidity. The membranes of this organism are made of the typical ether linked membrane lipids found solely in archaea and also contain a high level of carotenoids including lycopene, which gives them their distinctive red color.

Haloferax volcanii use a salt in method to maintain osmostasis, rather than the typical compatible solutes method seen in bacteria. This method involves the maintenance of a high degree of potassium ions in the cell to balance the sodium ions outside. For this reason, H. volcanii has a complex ion regulation system.

Haloferax volcanii will optimally grow between 42 & 45 °C in 1.5–2.5 M NaCl and complex nutrient medium. It will still grow at 37 °C, but still requires the concentrated NaCl and complex medium.

Due to the salt in method cytoplasmic proteins are structured to fold in the presence of high ionic concentrations. As such, they typically have a large number of charged residues on the exterior section of the protein and very hydrophobic residues forming a core. This structure considerably increases their stability in saline and even high temperature environments but comes at some loss of processivity compared to bacterial homologs.

Haloferax volcanii respire as their sole source of ATP, unlike several other halobateriacae, such as Halobacterium salinarum they are incapable of photophosphorylation as they lack the necessary bacteriorhodopsin.

== Ecology ==
Isolates of H. volcanii are commonly found in high-salinity aquatic environments, such as the Dead Sea. Their precise role in the ecosystem is uncertain, but the carbohydrates contained within these organisms potentially serve many practical purposes. Because of their ability to maintain homeostasis in spite of the salt around them, H. volcanii could be an important player in advancements in biotechnology. As it is likely that H. volcanii and comparable species are ranked among the earliest living organisms, they also provide information related to genetics and evolution.

=== Dead Sea ===
The Dead Sea contains a very high concentration of sodium, magnesium, and calcium salts. This combination makes the sea an ideal environment for extremophiles such as H.volcanii. The Dead Sea has a diverse community of microorganisms, though the field tests completed by Kaplan and Friedman reported that H.volcanii had the largest numerical presence within the community. It is common to find higher numbers of the halophile during the summer, as the Dead Sea is much warmer, averaging around 37 degrees Celsius, and thus more conducive to bacterial blooms. Unfortunately, the Dead Sea is becoming less hospitable to extremophiles such as H. volcanii due to increasing salinity, credited to both natural factors and human activities. As the predominant environment for Haloferax volcanii, the change in salinity places the species at risk.

== DNA damage and repair ==
In prokaryotes the DNA genome is organized in a dynamic structure, the nucleoid, which is embedded in the cytoplasm. Exposure of Haloferax volcanii to stresses that damage the DNA cause compaction and reorganization of the nucleoid. Compaction depends on the Mre11-Rad50 protein complex that is employed in the homologous recombinational repair of DNA double-strand breaks. Delmas et al. proposed that nucleoid compaction is part of a DNA damage response that accelerates cell recovery by helping DNA repair proteins to locate targets, and by facilitating the search for intact DNA sequences during homologous recombination.

== Genetic exchange ==
It has been shown that H. volcanii, can undergo a process of genetic exchange by mixing cells together on a solid, nitrocellulose membrane. The process of transduction and transformation were ruled out, leaving conjugation as a potential transfer mechanism. This mechanism is thought to be novel from other known forms, as genetic exchange does not seem to be unidirectional like in classic forms of conjugation of other prokaryotic systems.

Prolonged contact between cells is required as cells grown in liquid media, while being agitated, show no genetic transfer. Electron microscopy experiments have captured images of H. volcanii cells attached to each other via multiple cytoplasmic bridge-like structures and it is thought that this is the apparent method of genetic exchange. The protein machinery directly involved in the formation of these bridges and transfer of DNA is yet to be discovered though a study publishing RNAseq data hints at various proteins involved. Others have also shown that manipulating environmental salt concentrations, global glycosylation, and cell surface lipidation alter the rate of the genetic transfer.

This archaeal DNA conjugation system has been shown to even work in an interspecies manner as H. volcanii and the closely related species H. mediterranei are able to exchange genetic information by this process at a similar level to intraspecies exchange. Unless selecting for the need to recombine the exchanging chromosomes, recombination is not required for survival of the exchanging cells. This can lead to the formation of hybrid cells which contain two distinct chromosomes.

CRISPR may also be playing a role in the regulation of this genetic transfer as cells are shown to acquire new spacers into their CRISPR arrays during this process.

== Astrobiology ==
The conditions in which Haloferax volcanii survives—high salinity and high radiation—are very similar to the conditions found on Mars's surface. Consequently, the organism is currently being used to test the survivability of earth-native extremophiles on Mars. Advances in this field could lead to a greater understanding of the possibility and development of extraterrestrial life.

== See also ==
- Archaea
- Homologous recombination
- Extremophile
- FtsZ

== Sources ==
- Duggin, Iain G.; Aylett, Christopher H. S.; Walsh, James C.; Michie, Katharine A.; Wang, Qing; Turnbull, Lynne; Dawson, Emma M.; Harry, Elizabeth J.; Whitchurch, Cynthia B.; Amos, Linda A.; Löwe, Jan (December 2014). "CetZ tubulin-like proteins control archaeal cell shape". Nature. 519 (7543): 362–5. doi:10.1038/nature13983. PMC 4369195. PMID 25533961.
- Walsh, James C.; Angstmann, Christopher N.; Bisson-Filho, Alexandre W.; Garner, Ethan C.; Duggin, Iain G.; Curmi, Paul M. G. (June 2019). "Division plane placement in pleomorphic archaea is dynamically coupled to cell shape". Molecular Microbiology. 112 (3): 785–799. doi:10.1111/mmi.14316. PMC 6736733. PMID 31136034.
