= Halogranum =

Scientific classification
- Domain: Archaea
- Kingdom: Methanobacteriati
- Phylum: Methanobacteriota
- Class: Halobacteria
- Order: Haloferacales
- Family: Haloferacaceae
- Genus: Halogranum; Cui et al. 2010

Type species
- Halogranum rubrum Cui et al. 2010

Species
- H. amylolyticum; H. gelatinilyticum; H. rubrum; H. salarium

Genus of archaea

Halogranum (common abbreviation Hgn.) is a genus of halophilic archaea in the family Haloferacaceae.

== Phylogeny ==
The currently accepted taxonomy is based on the List of Prokaryotic names with Standing in Nomenclature (LPSN) and National Center for Biotechnology Information (NCBI).

16S rRNA based LTP_07_2026

- Halogranum
  - H. gelatinilyticum Cui et al. 2011
  - - H. amylolyticum Cui et al. 2011
    - - H. rubrum Cui et al. 2010
      - H. salarium Kim et al. 2012

53 marker proteins based GTDB 11-RS232

- Halogranum
  - H. gelatinilyticum
  - - H. amylolyticum
    - H. rubrum [incl. H. salarium]

== See also ==
- List of Archaea genera
