= Zabuyelite =

Carbonate mineral

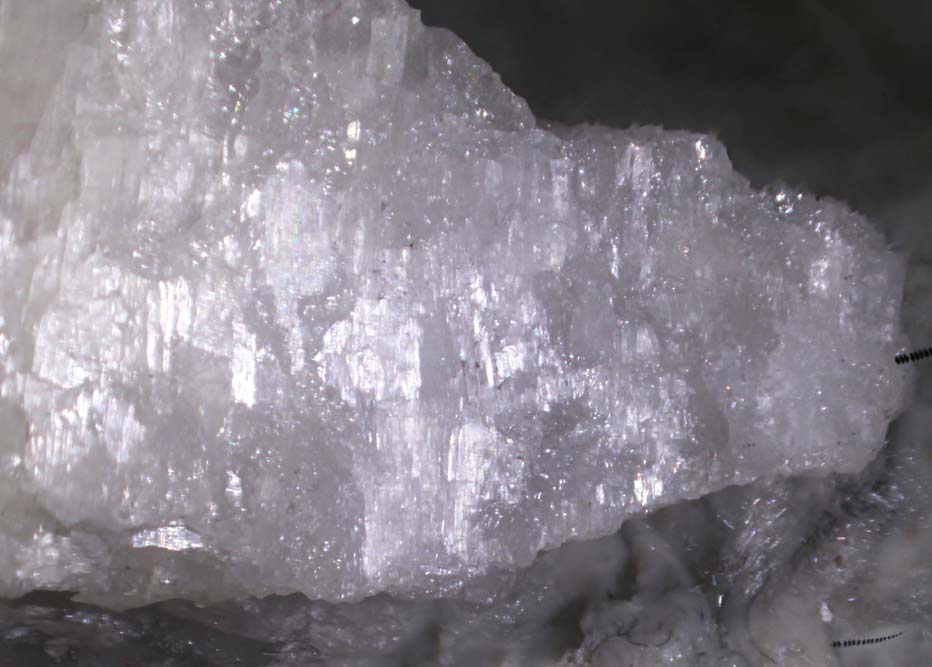
- Zabuyelite crystals found in spodumene

General
- Category: Carbonate mineral
- Formula: Li_{2}CO_{3}
- IMA symbol: Zab
- Strunz classification: 5.AA.05
- Crystal system: Monoclinic
- Crystal class: Prismatic (2/m) (same H-M symbol)
- Space group: C2/c

Identification
- Formula mass: 73.89 g/mol
- Color: Colorless
- Cleavage: {100} perfect; {011} good
- Tenacity: Brittle
- Mohs scale hardness: 3
- Streak: White
- Specific gravity: 2.09
- Optical properties: Biaxial (–)
- Refractive index: n_{α} = 1.4285, n_{β} = 1.5672, n_{γ} = 1.5743
- Birefringence: δ = 0.1458
- Pleochroism: none
- 2V angle: 25°

Zabuyelite is the natural mineral form of lithium carbonate, with a formula Li_{2}CO_{3}. It was discovered in 1987 at Lake Zabuye, Tibet, after which it is named. It forms colorless vitreous monoclinic crystals.

It occurs as inclusions within halite in lithium rich evaporites and as solid phase in fluid inclusions in the mineral spodumene. Associated minerals include halite, gaylussite and northupite in the Tibet locality.

In addition to the Tibetan salt lake it has been reported from Bikita and Kamativi in Zimbabwe, from Kings Mountain, Cleveland County, North Carolina, US and the Tanco pegmatite, Bernic Lake, Manitoba, Canada.
