= Halobaculum =

Scientific classification
- Domain: Archaea
- Kingdom: Methanobacteriati
- Phylum: Methanobacteriota
- Class: Halobacteria
- Order: Haloferacales
- Family: Halorubraceae
- Genus: Halobaculum; Oren et al. 1995

Type species
- Halobaculum gomorrense Oren et al. 1995

Species
- See text

Genus of archaea

Halobaculum (common abbreviation: Hbl.) is a genus of archaeans in the family Halorubraceae.

== Phylogeny ==
The currently accepted taxonomy is based on the List of Prokaryotic names with Standing in Nomenclature (LPSN) and National Center for Biotechnology Information (NCBI).

16S rRNA based LTP_07_2026

- Halobaculum
  - H. magnesiiphilum
  - - H. roseum
    - - - H. litoreum
        - - H. halobium
          - H. limi
      - - H. gomorrense
        - - - H. lipolyticum
            - H. rubrum
          - - H. saliterrae
            - - H. marinum
              - H. rarum

53 marker proteins based GTDB 11-RS232

- Halobaculum
  - - H. limi Tan et al. 2024
    - - H. marinum Tan et al. 2024
      - - H. lipolyticum Tan et al. 2024
        - H. litoreum Tan et al. 2024
  - - H. gomorrense Oren et al. 1995
    - - - H. halobium Tan et al. 2024
        - - H. magnesiiphilum Shimoshige et al. 2013
          - H. roseum Chen et al. 2017
      - - H. rarum Zhu et al. 2025
        - - H. rubrum Dilmurat et al. 2022
          - H. saliterrae Myers & King 2020

== See also ==
- List of Archaea genera
