= Tibet Mineral Development =

Chinese state-owned mining company

Tibet Mineral Development Company Limited
- Type: Public; partly state-owned
- Traded as: SZSE: 000762
- Industry: Mining
- Founded: 1967; 59 years ago
- Headquarters: Lhasa, China
- Products: Chromite, copper, lithium carbonate, ferrochrome, chrome salts
- Parent: China Baowu Iron & Steel Group Company Limited
- Website: www.xizangkuangye.cn

Tibet Mineral Development Company Limited, known as Tibet Mining (Chinese: 西藏矿业, SZSE: 000762), is a partly state-owned enterprise engaged in the exploration, mining, processing, and sales of non-ferrous mineral resources in the Tibet Autonomous Region. The company focuses on chromium, copper, and increasingly lithium resources. It operates under the control of China Baowu Iron & Steel Group, one of the largest state-owned steel companies in China.

== History ==
The company originated with the creation of the Dongfeng Mine (Chinese: 东风矿) in 1967, a state-owned operation established under the direction of the central government. In 1984, with approval from the Ministry of Metallurgy and the People's Government of the Tibet Autonomous Region, the Dongfeng Mine team was relocated to Lobusha Township, Qusum County in Shannan, Tibet, where they initiated mining operations at the Lobusha Mine.

The company was restructured as Tibet Mineral Development in early 1997, bringing together various mineral-related assets in the region. On July 8, 1997, it was listed on the Shenzhen Stock Exchange.

On June 4, 2020, China Baowu Steel Group acquired Tibet Mining Assets Management Co., Ltd., making it the largest shareholder. The TAR SASAC became the secondary major shareholder.

== Mining Operations ==
=== Lobusha Chromite Mine ===
The Lobusha Mine (洛布夏铬铁矿) in Qusum County, Shannan, is Tibet Mining's flagship operation. It produces high-grade chromite ore, which is processed into ferrochrome alloy and chrome salt products. It has been in operation since the 1980s and continues to be one of the most significant chromite deposits in Tibet.

=== Zabuye Salt Lake Lithium Project ===
In 2021, Tibet Mining initiated Phase II of the Zabuye Salt Lake development project, aiming to construct a 10,000-ton battery-grade lithium carbonate plant. The RMB 2 billion project aims to capitalize on China's surging demand for lithium used in electric vehicle batteries.

The Zabuye Salt Lake is located in the western region of Tibet and is considered one of China's highest-grade lithium brine deposits. The lithium carbonate produced here is expected to supply China's growing battery materials industry.

=== Copper Exploration ===
Tibet Mining also engages in copper exploration and development activities, primarily within the southern regions of Tibet. While less developed than its chromium and lithium operations, copper remains a strategic resource in the company's portfolio and is expected to expand in the coming years.
