= Lithium carbonate =

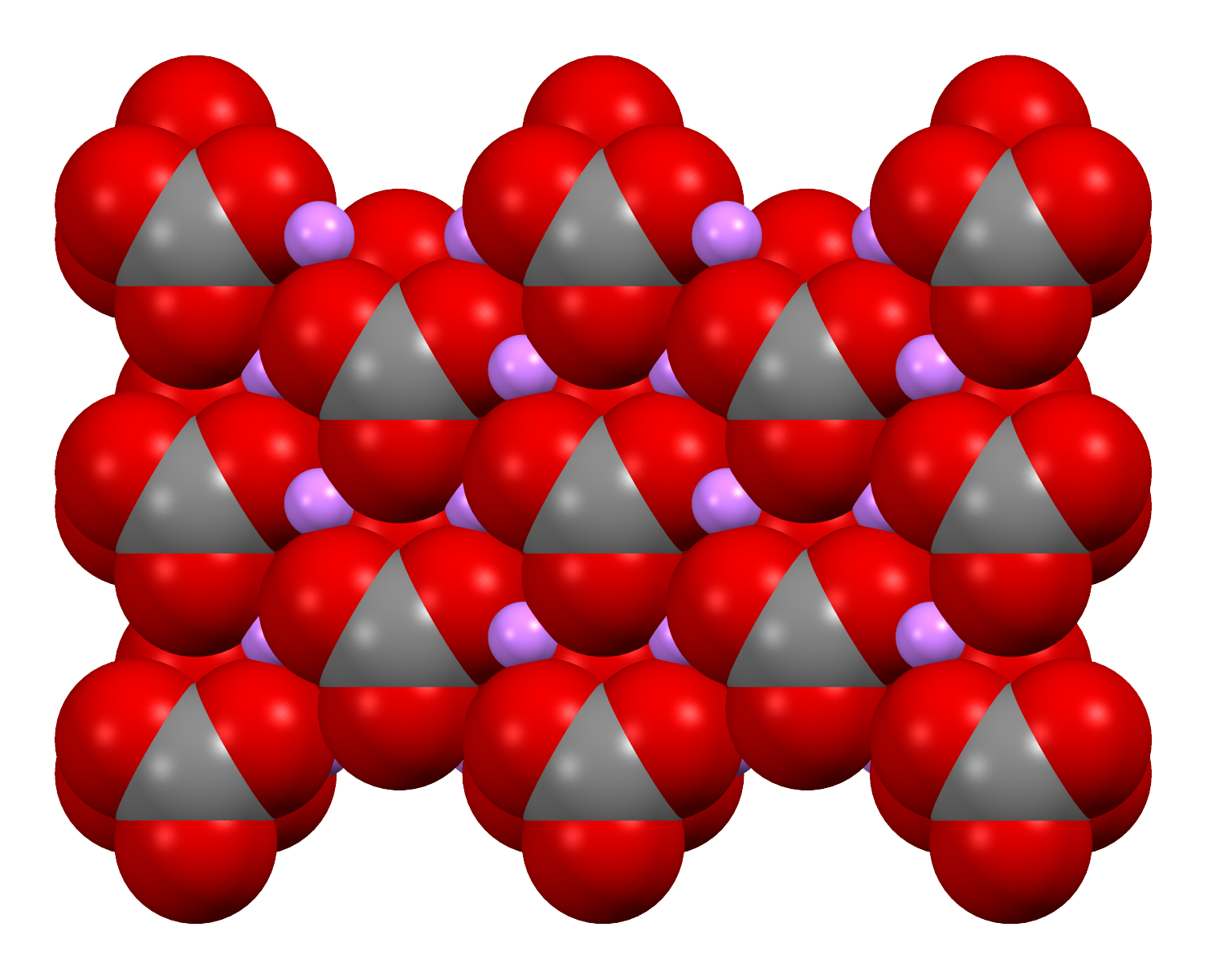

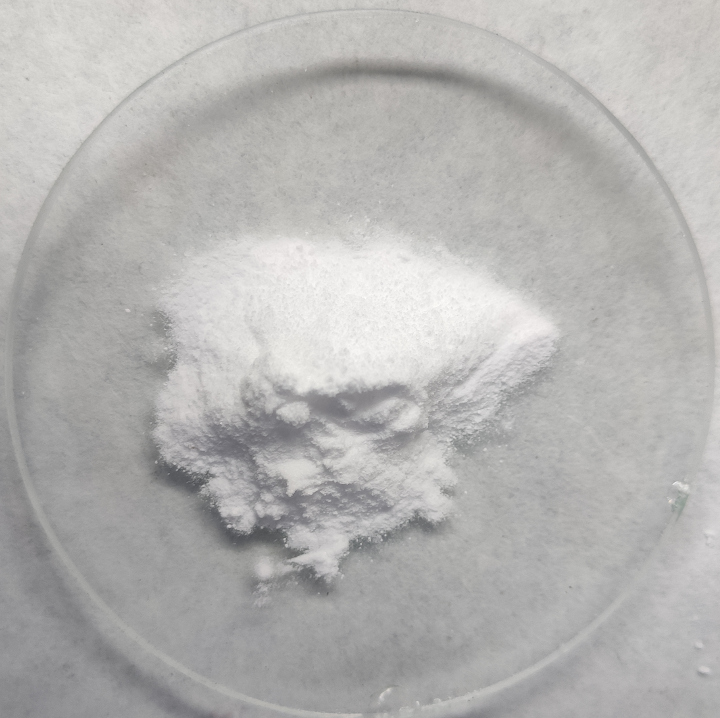

Names
- IUPAC name Lithium carbonate
- Other names Dilithium carbonate, Carbolith, Cibalith-S, Duralith, Eskalith, Lithane, Lithizine, Lithobid, Lithonate, Lithotabs Priadel, Zabuyelite

Identifiers
CAS Number	554-13-2
3D model (JSmol)	Interactive image
ChEBI	CHEBI:6504
ChEMBL	ChEMBL1200826
ChemSpider	10654
ECHA InfoCard	100.008.239
KEGG	D00801
PubChem CID	11125
RTECS number	OJ5800000
UNII	2BMD2GNA4V
CompTox Dashboard (EPA)	DTXSID1023784
- InChI: InChI=1S/CH2O3.2Li/c2-1(3)4;;/h(H2,2,3,4);;/q;2*+1/p-2 Key: XGZVUEUWXADBQD-UHFFFAOYSA-L; InChI=1/CH2O3.2Li/c2-1(3)4;;/h(H2,2,3,4);;/q;2*+1/p-2 Key: XGZVUEUWXADBQD-NUQVWONBAY
- SMILES: [Li+].[Li+].[O-]C([O-])=O

Properties
Chemical formula	Li_{2}CO_{3}
Molar mass	73.89 g/mol
Appearance	Odorless white powder
Density	2.11 g/cm^{3}
Melting point	723 °C (1,333 °F; 996 K)
Boiling point	1,310 °C (2,390 °F; 1,580 K); Decomposes from ~1300 °C
Solubility in water	1.54 g/100 mL (0 °C); 1.43 g/100 mL (10 °C); 1.29 g/100 mL (25 °C); 1.08 g/100 mL (40 °C); 0.69 g/100 mL (100 °C)
Solubility product (K_{sp})	8.15×10^{−4}
Solubility	Insoluble in acetone, ammonia, alcohol
Magnetic susceptibility (χ)	−27.0·10^{−6} cm^{3}/mol
Refractive index (n_{D})	1.428
Viscosity	4.64 cP (777 °C); 3.36 cP (817 °C)

Thermochemistry
Heat capacity (C)	97.4 J/mol·K
Std molar entropy (S^{⦵}_{298})	90.37 J/mol·K
Std enthalpy of formation (Δ_{f}H^{⦵}_{298})	−1215.6 kJ/mol
Gibbs free energy (Δ_{f}G^{⦵})	−1132.4 kJ/mol

Hazards
- Occupational safety and health (OHS/OSH)
Main hazards	Irritant
- GHS labelling
Pictograms	(GHS07: Exclamation mark)
Signal word	Warning
Hazard statements	H302, H319
Precautionary statements	P305+P351+P338
Flash point	Non-flammable
- Lethal dose or concentration (LD, LC)
LD_{50} (median dose)	525 mg/kg (oral, rat)
Safety data sheet (SDS)	ICSC 1109

Related compounds
Other cations	Sodium carbonate Potassium carbonate Rubidium carbonate Caesium carbonate
- Except where otherwise noted, data are given for materials in their standard state (at 25 °C [77 °F], 100 kPa). verify (what is ?) Infobox references

Lithium carbonate is an inorganic compound, the lithium salt of carbonic acid with the formula Li_{2}CO_{3}.

Lithium carbonate is an important industrial chemical. It is a precursor to compounds used in lithium-ion batteries.

Glasses derived from lithium carbonate are useful in ovenware. Lithium carbonate is a common ingredient in both low-fire and high-fire ceramic glaze. It forms low-melting fluxes with silica and other materials. Its alkaline properties are conducive to changing the state of metal oxide colorants in glaze, particularly red iron oxide (Fe_{2}O_{3}). Cement sets more rapidly when prepared with lithium carbonate, and is useful for tile adhesives. When added to aluminium trifluoride, it forms LiF which yields a superior electrolyte for the processing of aluminium.

== Rechargeable batteries ==
Lithium carbonate-derived compounds are crucial to lithium-ion batteries. Lithium carbonate may be converted into lithium hydroxide as an intermediate. In practice, two components of the battery are made with lithium compounds: the cathode and the electrolyte. The electrolyte is a solution of lithium hexafluorophosphate, while the cathode uses one of several lithiated structures, the most popular of which are lithium cobalt oxide and lithium iron phosphate.

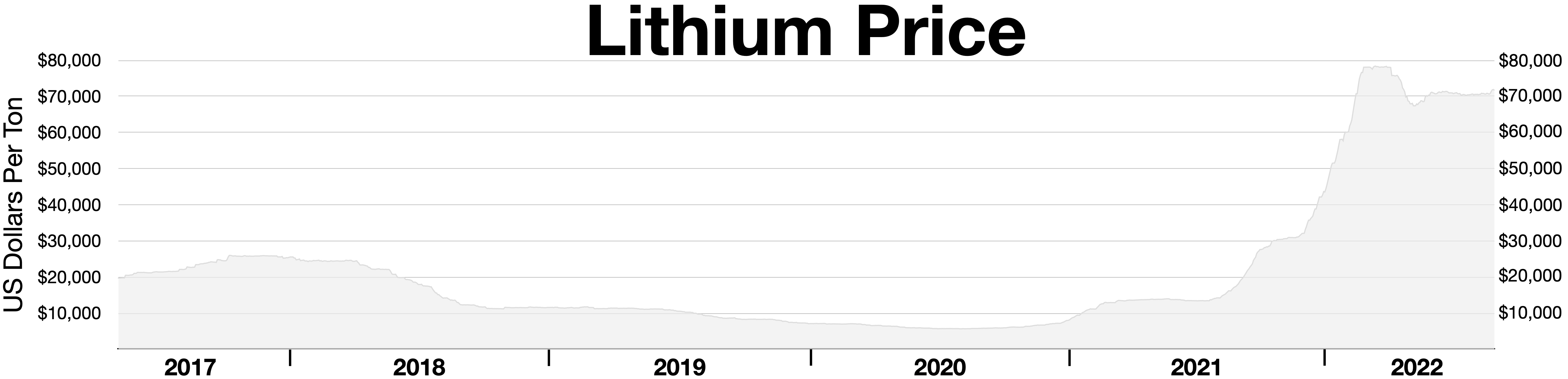
Lithium prices

== Medical uses ==
In 1843, lithium carbonate was used to treat bladder and kidney stones. In 1859, some doctors recommended the compound for a number of ailments, including gout, urinary calculi, rheumatism, mania, depression, and headache.

In 1948, John Cade discovered the anti-manic effects of lithium ions. This finding led to lithium carbonate's use as a psychiatric medication to treat mania, the elevated phase of bipolar disorder. Mogens Schou and others continued Cade's research. They found that lithium is effective against both mania and depression, and has preventative effects.

Lithium is also unique among medications in that it has anti-suicide properties in people with bipolar disorder or recurrent depression. It has been shown to dramatically reduce the risk of suicide by 87% in clinical trials. In addition to its effects on suicide, lithium also reduces the risk of death from all causes in people with mood disorders.

Prescription lithium carbonate from a pharmacy is suitable for use as medicine in humans but industrial lithium carbonate is not since it may contain unsafe levels of toxic heavy metals or other toxicants. After ingestion, lithium carbonate is dissociated into pharmacologically active lithium ions (Li^{+}) and (non-therapeutic) carbonate, with 300 mg of lithium carbonate containing approximately 8 mEq (8 mmol) of lithium ion. The usual dosage of lithium is 600-900 mg/day for the maintenance treatment of bipolar disorder.

The exact dose of lithium given varies depending on factors such as the patient's serum lithium concentrations, which must be closely monitored by a physician to avoid lithium toxicity and potential kidney damage (or even kidney failure) from lithium-induced nephrogenic diabetes insipidus. Dehydration and certain drugs, including NSAIDs such as ibuprofen, can increase serum lithium concentrations to unsafe levels whereas other drugs, such as caffeine, may decrease concentrations.

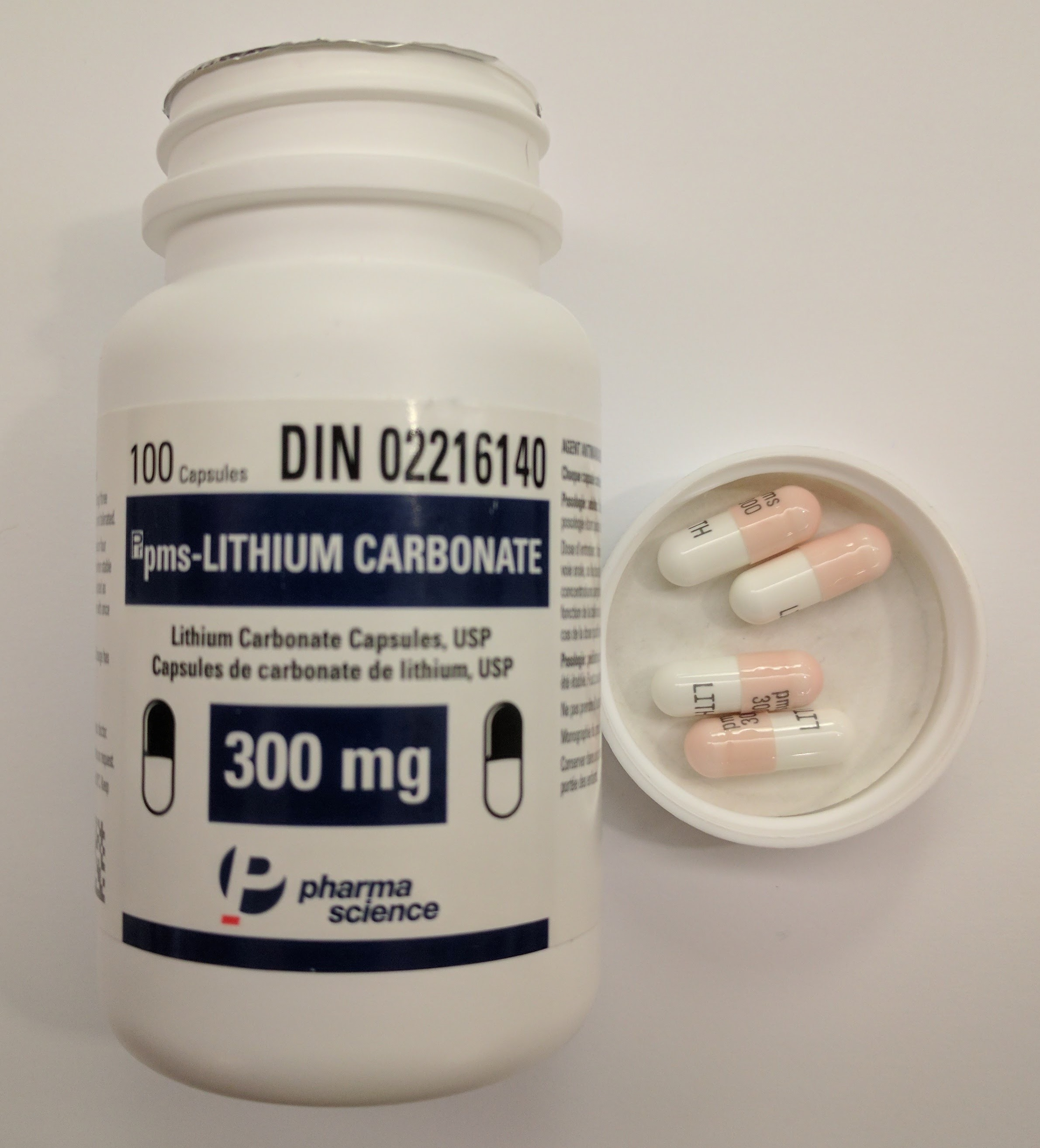
Lithium carbonate capsules.

In contrast to the elemental ions sodium, potassium, and calcium, there is no known cellular mechanism specifically dedicated to regulating intracellular lithium. Lithium can enter cells through epithelial sodium channels. Lithium ions interfere with ion transport processes that relay and amplify messages carried to the cells of the brain. Mania is associated with irregular increases in protein kinase C (PKC) activity within the brain. Lithium carbonate and sodium valproate, another drug conventionally used to treat the disorder, act in the brain by inhibiting PKC's activity and help to produce other compounds that also inhibit the PKC. Lithium carbonate's mood-controlling properties are not fully understood.

=== Health risks ===
Taking lithium salts has risks and side effects. Extended use of lithium to treat mental disorders has been known to lead to acquired nephrogenic diabetes insipidus. Lithium toxicity can affect the central nervous system and renal system and can be lethal at levels above 2.0 mmol/L. Over a prolonged period, lithium can accumulate in the principal cells of the collecting duct and interfere with antidiuretic hormone (ADH), which regulates the water permeability of principal cells in the collecting tubule. The medullary interstitium of the collecting duct system naturally has a high sodium concentration and attempts to maintain it. There is no known mechanism for cells to distinguish lithium ions from sodium ions, so damage to the kidney's nephrons may occur if lithium concentrations become too high as a result of dehydration, hyponatremia, an unusually low sodium diet, or certain drugs.

== Red pyrotechnic colorant ==
Lithium carbonate is used to impart a red color to fireworks.

== Properties and reactions ==
Unlike sodium carbonate, which forms at least three hydrates, lithium carbonate exists only in the anhydrous form. Its solubility in water is low relative to other lithium salts. The isolation of lithium from aqueous extracts of lithium ores capitalizes on this poor solubility. Its apparent solubility increases 10-fold under a mild pressure of carbon dioxide; this effect is due to the formation of the metastable lithium bicarbonate, which is more soluble:

Li_{2}CO_{3} + CO_{2} + H_{2}O ⇌ 2 LiHCO_{3}

The extraction of lithium carbonate at high pressures of CO_{2} and its precipitation upon depressurizing is the basis of the Quebec process.

Lithium carbonate can also be purified by exploiting its diminished solubility in hot water. Thus, heating a saturated aqueous solution causes crystallization of Li_{2}CO_{3}.

Lithium carbonate, and other carbonates of group 1, do not decarboxylate readily. Li_{2}CO_{3} decomposes at temperatures around 1300 °C.

== Production ==
Lithium carbonate is made from primarily two sources: spodumene and petalite ores, and underground brine pools. About 82,000 tons were produced in 2020, showing significant and consistent growth.

=== From underground brine reservoirs ===
In the Salar de Atacama in the Atacama Desert of Northern Chile, lithium carbonate and lithium hydroxide are produced from brine.

The process pumps lithium rich brine from below ground into shallow pans for evaporation. The brine contains many different dissolved ions, and as their concentration increases, salts precipitate out of solution and sink. The remaining supernatant liquid is used for the next step. The sequence of pans may vary depending on the concentration of ions in a particular source of brine.

In the first pan, halite (sodium chloride or common salt) crystallizes. This has little economic value and is discarded. The supernatant, with ever increasing concentration of dissolved solids, is transferred successively to the sylvinite (sodium potassium chloride) pan, the carnallite (potassium magnesium chloride) pan and finally a pan designed to maximize the concentration of lithium chloride. The process takes about 15 months. The concentrate (30-35% lithium chloride solution) is trucked to Salar del Carmen. There, boron and magnesium are removed (typically residual boron is removed by solvent extraction and/or ion exchange and magnesium by raising the pH above 10 with sodium hydroxide) then in the final step, by addition of sodium carbonate, the desired lithium carbonate is precipitated out, separated, and processed.

Some of the by-products from the evaporation process may also have economic value.

There is considerable attention to the use of water in this water poor region. SQM commissioned a life-cycle analysis (LCA) which concluded that water consumption for SQM's lithium hydroxide and carbonate is significantly lower than the average consumption by production from the main ore-based process, using spodumene. A more general LCA suggests the opposite for extraction from reservoirs.

The majority of brine based production is in the "lithium triangle" in South America.

=== From "geothermal" brine ===
A potential source of lithium is the leachates of geothermal wells, carried to the surface. Recovery of lithium has been demonstrated in the field; the lithium is separated by simple precipitation and filtration. The process and environmental costs are primarily those of the already-operating well; net environmental impacts may thus be positive.

The brine of United Downs Deep Geothermal Power project near Redruth is claimed by Cornish Lithium to be valuable due to its high lithium concentration (220 mg/L) with low magnesium (<5 mg/L) and total dissolved solids content of <29g/L, and a flow rate of 40-60l/s.

=== From ore ===
α-spodumene is roasted at 1100 °C for 1h to make β-spodumene, then roasted at 250 °C for 10 minutes with sulfuric acid.

As of 2020, Australia was the world's largest producer of lithium intermediates, all based on spodumene.

In recent years mining companies have begun exploration of lithium projects throughout North America, South America and Australia to identify economic deposits that can potentially bring new supplies of lithium carbonate online to meet the growing demand for the product.

=== From clay ===
In 2020 Tesla Motors announced a revolutionary process to extract lithium from clay in Nevada using only salt and no acid. This was met with skepticism.

=== From end-of-life batteries ===
A few small companies are recycling spent batteries, focusing on recovering copper and cobalt. Some recover lithium carbonate alongside the compound Li_{2}Al_{4}(CO_{3})(OH)_{12}⋅3H_{2}O also.

=== Other ===
In April 2017 MGX Minerals reported it had received independent confirmation of its rapid lithium extraction process to recover lithium and other valuable minerals from oil and gas wastewater brine.

Electrodialysis has been proposed to extract lithium from seawater, but it is not commercially viable.

== Natural occurrence ==
Natural lithium carbonate is known as zabuyelite. This mineral is connected with deposits of some salt lakes and some pegmatites.

== Lithium carbonate equivalent ==
Lithium carbonate equivalent, abbreviated LCE, is an industry standard for lithium compounds whose lithium content is expressed in weight-equivalent of lithium carbonate. The term is commonly used in the lithium mining industry.

== See also ==
- Lithium (medication)
