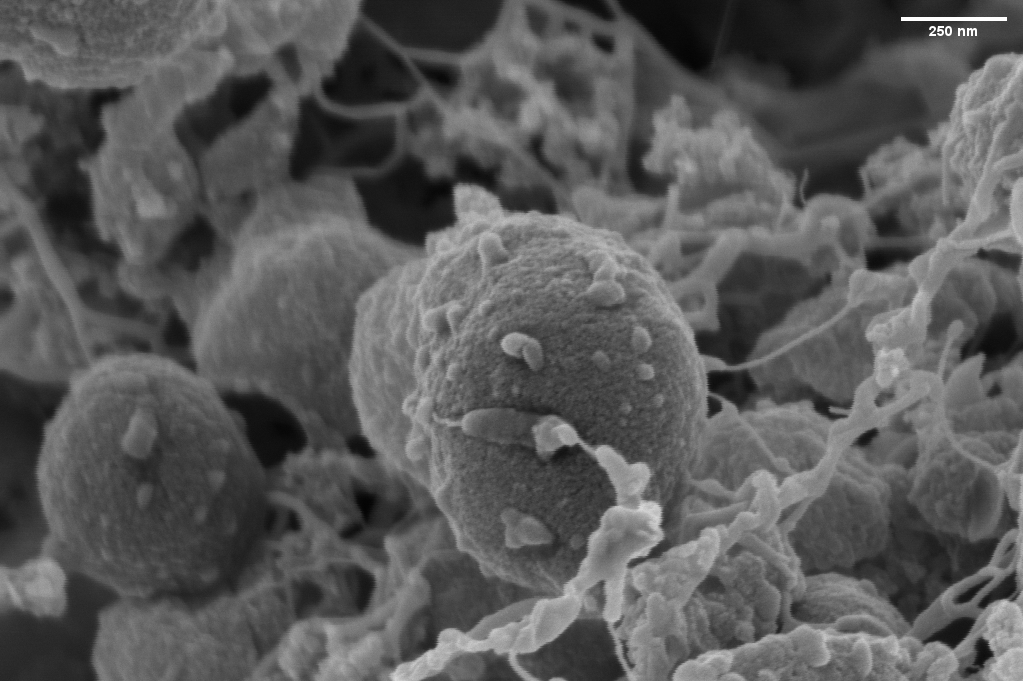
- SEM image of Haloferax mediterranei.

Scientific classification
- Domain: Archaea
- Kingdom: Methanobacteriati
- Phylum: Methanobacteriota
- Class: Halobacteria
- Order: Haloferacales
- Family: Haloferacaceae
- Genus: Haloferax; Torreblanca et al. 1986

Type species
- Haloferax volcanii (Mullakhanbhai & Larsen 1975) Torreblanca et al. 1986

Species
- See text

= Haloferax =

Genus of archaea

Haloferax (common abbreviation: Hfx.) is a genus of halobacteria in the order Haloferacaceae.

== Genetic exchange ==
Cells of H. mediterranei and cells of the related species H. volcanii can undergo a process of genetic exchange between two cells which involves cell fusion resulting in a heterodiploid cell (containing two different chromosomes in one cell). Although this genetic exchange ordinarily occurs between two cells of the same species, it can also occur at a lower frequency between an H. mediterranei and an H. volcani cell. These two species have an average nucleotide sequence identity of 86.6%. During this exchange process, a diploid cell is formed that contains the full genetic repertoire of both parental cells, and genetic recombination is facilitated. Subsequently, the cells separate, giving rise to recombinant cells.

== Taxonomy ==
As of 2022, 13 species are validly published under the genus Haloferax.

Proposed species

Several species and novel binomial names have been proposed, but not validly published.

- "Haloferax antrum" Enache et al. 2006, "Haloferax opilio" Enache et al. 2006, "Haloferax rutilus" Enache et al. 2006 and "Haloferax viridis" Enache et al. 2006 were isolated from Romanian salt lakes and first proposed as new species in 2006. Only H. prahovense, that was proposed along them has since been validly published.
- "Haloferax berberensis" Kharroub et al. 2005e was isolated in Algeria and proposed as new species in 2005.
- Haloferax litoreum, Haloferax marinisediminis and Haloferax marinum were first published in 2021, but are not accepted as of 2022.
- Haloferax marisrubri and Haloferax profundi were first published in 2020, but is not accepted as of 2022.
- Haloferax massilisiensis or Haloferax massiliense was first published in 2016 and again in 2018 as human associated halophilic archaeon. As of 2022, this species is not accepted.

=== Phylogeny ===
The currently accepted taxonomy is based on the List of Prokaryotic names with Standing in Nomenclature (LPSN) and National Center for Biotechnology Information (NCBI).

16S rRNA based LTP_07_2026

- Haloferax
  - H. namakaokahaiae
  - - - H. marinum
      - - H. litoreum
        - H. marinisediminis
    - - - H. elongans
        - H. larsenii
      - - H. sulfurifontis Elshahed et al. 2004
        - - - H. mediterranei
            - H. mucosum
          - - - H. chudinovii
              - H. denitrificans
            - - H. lucentense corrig. Gutierrez et al. 2004
              - - H. gibbonsii
                - - H. prahovense
                  - - H. alexandrinus Asker & Ohta 2002
                    - H. volcanii

53 marker proteins based GTDB 11-RS232

- Haloferax
  - H. namakaokahaiae McDuff et al. 2017
  - - - H. elongans Allen et al. 2008
      - H. larsenii Xu et al. 2007
    - - - - H. litoreum Cho et al. 2025
          - "H. profundi" Zhang et al. 2020
        - - H. marinisediminis Cho et al. 2025
          - H. marinum Cho et al. 2025
      - - - H. mediterranei (Rodriguez-Valera et al. 1983) Torreblanca et al. 1987
          - H. mucosum Allen et al. 2008
        - - H. prahovense Enache et al. 2007
          - - H. gibbonsii Juez et al. 1986
            - - H. chudinovii Saralov et al. 2014
              - - H. denitrificans (Tomlinson et al. 1986) Tindall et al. 1989 [incl. H. sulfurifontis]
                - - H. volcanii (Mullakhanbhai & Larsen 1975) Torreblanca et al. 1986
                    [incl. H. alexandrinus, H. lucentense]
                  - - "H. marisrubri" Zhang et al. 2020
                    - "H. massiliensis" Khelaifia & Raoult 2016

Unassigned Haloferax:

- "H. antrum" Enache et al. 2006
- "H. berberensis" Kharroub et al. 2005e
- "H. opilio" Enache et al. 2006
- "H. rutilus" Enache et al. 2006
- "H. viridis" Enache et al. 2006

== Industrial biotechnology ==
Several Haloferax species, especially Haloferax mediterranei have gained eminence for their ability to serve as an efficient chassis for bioproduction. H. mediterranei is a well-known producer of polyhydroxyalkanoates, a sustainable and biodegradable bioplastic. They have been studied for the production of several value-added products such as bioplastics, pigments and exoenzymes. H. mediterranei is capable of accumulating high amounts of both homopolymer PHAs and co-polymer PHAs from a wide array of sustainable carbon substrates. Haloferax species have also been used to produce industrially relevant exoenzymes such as laccase for bioprocessing. Since they can thrive in extreme conditions of salinity, toxicity, heavy metal exposure and UV radiation, the fermentation costs are significantly lowered as the chance of contamination is reduced. In hypersaline environments like the Dead Sea & Great Salt Lake, Haloferax species shoulder most of the responsibility of denitrification. These strains could be leveraged for nitrogen removal systems designed to remediate saline effluents from fisheries, textile industries and food processing plants.

== See also ==
- Archaea
- List of Archaea genera
- Homologous recombination
- Extremophile
