= Halohasta =

Scientific classification
- Domain: Archaea
- Kingdom: Methanobacteriati
- Phylum: Methanobacteriota
- Class: Halobacteria
- Order: Haloferacales
- Family: Halorubraceae
- Genus: Halohasta; Mou et al. 2013

Type species
- Halohasta litorea Mou et al. 2013

Species
- H. litchfieldiae; H. litorea; H. salina

Genus of archaea

Halohasta (common abbreviation Hht.) is a genus of halophilic archaea in the family Halorubraceae.

== Phylogeny ==
The currently accepted taxonomy is based on the List of Prokaryotic names with Standing in Nomenclature (LPSN) and National Center for Biotechnology Information (NCBI).

16S rRNA based LTP_07_2026

- Halohasta
  - H. salina Cheng et al. 2023
  - - H. litchfieldiae Mou et al. 2013
    - H. litorea Mou et al. 2013

53 marker proteins based GTDB 11-RS232

- Halohasta
  - H. salina
  - - H. litchfieldiae
    - H. litorea

== See also ==
- List of Archaea genera
