= Deep Lake (Vestfold Hills, Antarctica) =

Lake in Antarctica

- Location within Antarctica
- Location: Antarctica
- Coordinates: 68°33′36.000″S 78°11′44.988″E
- Type: lake
- Max. depth: 36 meters (118 ft)

Deep Lake is a small hypersaline lake in the Vestfold Hills region of Antarctica.

Deep Lake's surface temperature on average ranges from -16 to 12 °C, with only a few meters at the lake's surface exceeding 0 °C for a few months of the year during the austral summer. Lake water temperatures can fall as low as -20 °C in winter, however the lake's water column is able to remain free of ice year-around due to the high salinity (~270 g/L) of the lake water. The archaeon Halorubrum lacusprofundi was first isolated from Deep Lake in the 1980s and is the first archaea domain member to be isolated from a cold environment. It has a max depth of 36 m (118 ft).
