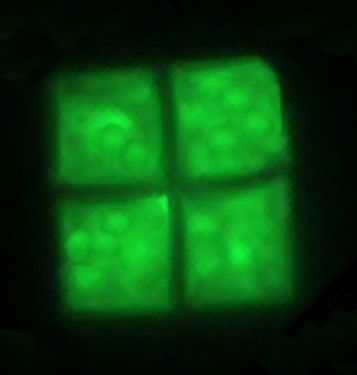
- Haloquadratum walsbyi

Scientific classification
- Domain: Archaea
- Kingdom: Methanobacteriati
- Phylum: Methanobacteriota
- Class: Halobacteria
- Order: Haloferacales
- Family: Haloferacaceae; Gupta et al. 2015

Genera
- See text

Synonyms
- Halorubraceae Gupta et al. 2016

= Haloferacaceae =

Family of bacteria

Haloferacaceae is a family of halophilic, chemoorganotrophic or heterotrophic archaea within the order Haloferacales. The type genus of this family is Haloferax. Its biochemical characteristics are the same as the order Haloferacales.

The name Haloferacaceae is derived from the Latin term Haloferax, referring to the type genus of the family and the suffix "-ceae", an ending used to denote a family. Together, Haloferacaceae refers to a family whose nomenclatural type is the genus Haloferax.

== Taxonomy and molecular signatures ==
As of 2021, Haloferacaceae contains 10 validly published genera. This family can be molecularly distinguished from other Halobacteria by the presence of five conserved signature proteins (CSPs) and four conserved signature indels (CSIs) present in the following proteins: thermosome, ribonuclease BN and hypothetical proteins.

== Phylogeny ==
The currently accepted taxonomy is based on the List of Prokaryotic names with Standing in Nomenclature (LPSN) and National Center for Biotechnology Information (NCBI).

16S rRNA based LTP_07_2026

- - - Natronoarchaeaceae
      - Natranaeroarchaeum
      - Natronoarchaeum
    - Halorubraceae
      - Halosubterraneus
      - - Haloparvum
        - - Halopenitus
          - Halorubrum
  - - other
    - - Haloferacaceae
        - - Salinirubrum
          - Natronorarus
        - - Halalkaliarchaeum
          - - - Halolamina
              - - Halorarum [incl. "Halonovum"]
                - Halobaculum
            - - - Salinirarus
                - Haloplanus
              - - - - Halalkalirubrum
                    - - Natronocalculus
                      - - Halohasta
                        - Halonotius
                  - - Halogranum
                    - - Halobium
                      - - Halegenticoccus
                        - Haloprofundus
                - - Salinigranum
                  - - Haloferax
                    - - Halopelagius
                      - - Halogeometricum
                        - - Haloquadratum
                          - Halobellus

53 marker proteins based GTDB 11-RS232

- Haloferacaceae
  - Salinirubrum corrig. Cui and Qiu 2014
  - - - - Salinirarus Zhang et al. 2025
        - Haloplanus Elevi Bardavid et al. 2007
      - - - Haloprofundus Zhang et al. 2017
          - - Halegenticoccus Liu et al. 2020
            - - Halobium Mori et al. 2016
              - Halogranum Cui et al. 2010
        - - Salinigranum Cui and Zhang 2014
          - - Haloferax Torreblanca et al. 1986
            - - Halopelagius Cui et al. 2010
              - - Halogeometricum Montalvo-Rodriguez et al. 1998
                - Haloquadratum Burns et al. 2007
                  [incl. Halobellus Cui et al. 2011]
    - - - Halolamina Cui et al. 2011
        - - "Ca. Halobonum" Ugalde et al. 2013
          - - Halorarum Tan et al. 2024
            - Halobaculum Oren et al. 1995
      - - - - Natronocalculus Sorokin et al. 2023
            - Halalkalirubrum Zuo et al. 2022
          - - Halohasta Mou et al. 2013
            - Halonotius Burns et al. 2010
        - - Halalkaliarchaeum Sorokin et al. 2019
          - - Halopenitus Amoozegar et al. 2012
            - - Haloparvum Chen et al. 2016
              - Halorubrum McGenity & Grant 1996

Unassigned Haloferacaceae:

- "Candidatus Halectosymbiota" corrig. Filker et al. 2014
- Halotolerantifilum Fisher et al. 2026

== See also ==
- List of Archaea genera
