= Halorubraceae =

Scientific classification
- Domain: Archaea
- Kingdom: Methanobacteriati
- Phylum: Methanobacteriota
- Class: Halobacteria
- Order: Haloferacales
- Family: Halorubraceae; Gupta et al. 2016

Genera
- See text

Family of archaea

Halorubraceae is a family of halophilic, chemoorganotrophic or heterotrophic archaea within the order Haloferacales. The type genus of this family is Halorubrum. Its biochemical characteristics are the same as the order Haloferacales.

The name Halorubraceae is derived from the Latin term Halorubrum, referring to the type genus of the family and the suffix "-ceae," an ending used to denote a family. Together, Halorubraceae refers to a family whose nomenclatural type is the genus Halorubrum.

== Current taxonomy and molecular signatures ==
As of 2021, Halorubraceae contains nine validly published genera. This family can be distinguished from other Halobacteria by the presence of four conserved signature proteins (CSPs).

== Phylogeny ==
The currently accepted taxonomy is based on the List of Prokaryotic names with Standing in Nomenclature (LPSN) and National Center for Biotechnology Information (NCBI).

16S rRNA based LTP_07_2026

- - - Natronoarchaeaceae
    - - Halorubraceae
        - Halosubterraneus
        - - Haloparvum
          - - Halopenitus
            - Halorubrum
  - - other
    - Haloferacaceae

53 marker proteins based GTDB 11-RS232

- Haloferacaceae
  - other
  - - other
    - - other
      - - other
        - - other
          - - Halopenitus Amoozegar et al. 2012
            - - Haloparvum Chen et al. 2016
              - Halorubrum McGenity & Grant 1996

== See also ==
- List of Archaea genera
