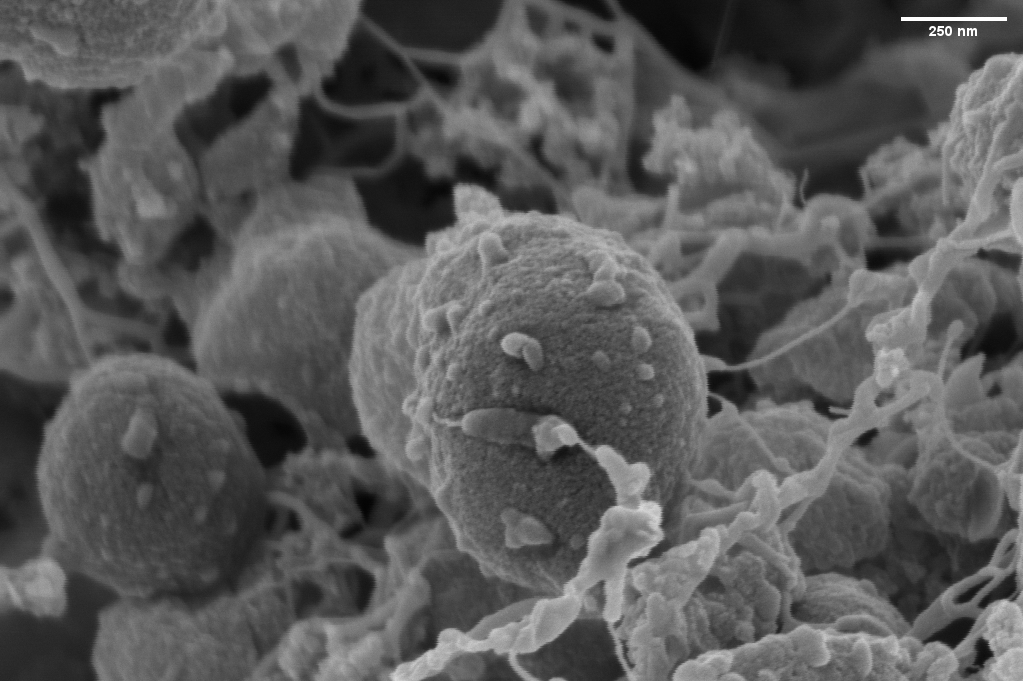
- SEM image of Haloferax mediterranei.

Scientific classification
- Domain: Archaea
- Kingdom: Methanobacteriati
- Phylum: Methanobacteriota
- Class: Halobacteria
- Order: Haloferacales; Gupta et al. 2015

Families
- Haloferacaceae; Halorubraceae

= Haloferacales =

Order of archaea

Haloferacales is an order of halophilic, chemoorganotrophic or heterotrophic archaea within the class Haloarchaea. The type genus of this order is Haloferax.

The name Haloferacales is derived from the Latin term Haloferax, referring to the type genus of the order and the suffix "-ales," an ending used to denote an order. Together, Haloferacales refers to an order whose nomenclatural type is the genus Haloferax.

== Biochemical characteristics and molecular signatures ==
Members are halophiles and can be chemoorganotrophs or heterotrophs and are isolated from high-salt environments such as marine solar salterns and the Dead Sea. Some members are motile and contain gas vesicles. Morphology is variable, including rod, coccus or flat square shapes. Members of this order grow optimally in neutral pH. The DNA G+C content for this order ranges between 55-66 mol%.

This order can be reliably distinguished from other Halobacteria by the presence of five conserved signature proteins (CSPs) and four conserved signature indels (CSIs) present in the following proteins: DNA gyrase B, prolyl t-RNA synthetase, acyl-CoA synthetase and aspartyl/glutamyl-tRNA amido-transferase subunit B.

== Historical systematics and current taxonomy ==
As of 2021, Haloferacales contains two families, Haloferacaceae and Halorubraceae. Members of this order was demarcated from the class Halobacteria, previously a large phylogenetically unrelated group of species with distinct biochemical characteristics and different ecological niches. The diverse range of morphological and physiological characteristics made it difficult to clarify the evolutionary relationship within the class beyond a genus level.

In 2015, Gupta et al. proposed the division of the class Halobacteria into the orders Halobacteriales, Haloferacales and Natrialbales based on comparative genomic analyses and the branching pattern of various phylogenetic trees constructed from several different datasets of conserved proteins and 16S rRNA sequences. Molecular markers, specifically conserved signature indels, specific to this order were also identified as evidence supporting the division independent of phylogenetic trees. Each order can be reliably distinguished from each other and other species based on the presence of these CSIs.

== Phylogeny ==
The currently accepted taxonomy is based on the List of Prokaryotic names with Standing in Nomenclature (LPSN) and National Center for Biotechnology Information (NCBI).

16S rRNA based LTP_07_2026

- - - Natronoarchaeaceae
    - Halorubraceae
  - - other
    - Haloferacaceae

53 marker proteins based GTDB 11-RS232

- Haloferacaceae [incl. Halorubraceae]

== See also ==
- List of Archaea genera
