= Methylocystis heyeri =

Scientific classification
- Domain: Bacteria
- Kingdom: Pseudomonadati
- Phylum: Pseudomonadota
- Class: Alphaproteobacteria
- Order: Hyphomicrobiales
- Family: Methylocystaceae
- Genus: Methylocystis
- Species: M. heyeri

Binomial name
- Methylocystis heyeri Dedysh et al. 2007

Type strain
- DSM 16984, H2, VKM B-2426

Species of bacterium

Methylocystis heyeri is a Gram-negative, aerobic, methanotrophic and non-motile bacterium species from the genus of Methylocystis that has been isolated from Sphagnum peat in the Großer Teufelssee in Germany.
