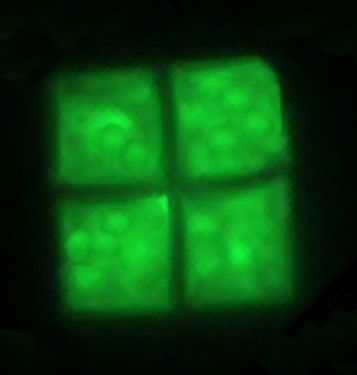

Scientific classification
- Domain: Archaea
- Kingdom: Methanobacteriati
- Phylum: Methanobacteriota
- Class: Halobacteria
- Order: Haloferacales
- Family: Haloferacaceae
- Genus: Haloquadratum; Burns et al. 2007

Type species
- Haloquadratum walsbyi Burns et al. 2007

Species
- H. walsbyi

= Haloquadratum =

Genus of archaea

Haloquadratum (common abbreviation: Hqr.) is a genus of archaean, belonging to the family Haloferacaceae. The first species to be identified in this group, Haloquadratum walsbyi, is unusual in that its cells are shaped like square, flat boxes.

This halophilic archaean, discovered in 1980 by A.E. Walsby in the Gavish Sabkha, a coastal hypersaline pool (sabkha) on the Sinai Peninsula in Egypt, was not cultured until 2004.

The cells typically contain polyhydroxyalkanoate (PHA) granules, as well as large numbers of refractile, gas-filled vacuoles which provide buoyancy in a watery environment and may help to position the cells to maximize light-harvesting. The cells may join with others to form fragile sheets up to 40 micrometres wide.

H. walsbyi can be found anywhere in hypersaline waters. When sea water evaporates, high concentration and precipitation of calcium carbonate and calcium sulfate result, leading to a hypersaline sodium chloride-rich brine. Further evaporation results in the precipitation of sodium chloride or halite, and then to a concentrated magnesium chloride brine termed bittern. During the final stage of halite formation, before magnesium chloride concentration causes the brine to become sterile, H. walsbyi flourishes and can make up 80% of the brine's biomass.

== Description and significance ==
H. walsbyi was first discovered in 1980 by A.E. Walsby in the Gavish Sabkha, a coastal brine pool in the Sinai peninsula, Egypt, and formally described by Burns et al. in 2007. The organisms were notable because of their extremely thin (around 0.15 μm), square-shaped structure. It was not cultivated in the lab until 2004.

== Genome structure ==
The mapping of H. walsbyi's genome has been completed, giving a better understanding of the organism's genealogy and taxonomy, and the role it plays in the ecosystem. A genomic comparison of the Spanish and Australian isolates (strains HBSQ001 and C23^{T}) strongly suggests a rapid global dispersion, as they are so similar and have retained gene order (synteny).

== Cell structure and metabolism ==
H.walsbyi has a unique cell shape – that of an extremely thin square, its best-known characteristic. The cells possess an abundance of intracellular refractile bodies known as gas vacuoles – vacuoles filled with gas which provide buoyancy – maintaining upper position in the water column. Individual square cells are joined with others to form large sheets, sometimes as large as 40 μm. These sheets are extremely fragile and the connections between the cells are easily broken.

Its mode of metabolism is not completely known; complete genetic information will give researchers necessary insight.

== Ecology ==
H. walsbyi was first noticed and taken from saline pools in Egypt, but it can be found in hypersaline bodies of water all over the world. Evaporation of water in these pools leaves high concentrations of salt, making for its optimal growth environment. According to Bolhuis et al., "In this sense, they are the most hyperhalophilic organisms known, as further concentration of the magnesium salts (bitterns) leads to sterility of the brines." Its precise role in the ecosystem is not known for sure, but because of its unique morphology, learning more about it will surely provide some information on the evolution and morphological adaptation of archaeans.

== Phylogeny ==
The currently accepted taxonomy is based on the List of Prokaryotic names with Standing in Nomenclature (LPSN) and National Center for Biotechnology Information (NCBI).

16S rRNA based LTP_07_2026

- - - Halobellus rubicundus Hwang et al. 2025
    - - Haloquadratum walsbyi Burns et al. 2007
      - - Halobellus~1
          - Halobellus inordinatus Qui et al. 2013
          - Halobellus ramosii Perez-Davo et al. 2015
  - Halobellus s.s.

53 marker proteins based GTDB 11-RS232

- Haloquadratum
  - H. walsbyi (Walsby's square haloarchaeon)
  - all Halobellus species

== See also ==
- List of Archaea genera
