= Heterotroph =

Organism that ingests organic carbon for nutrition

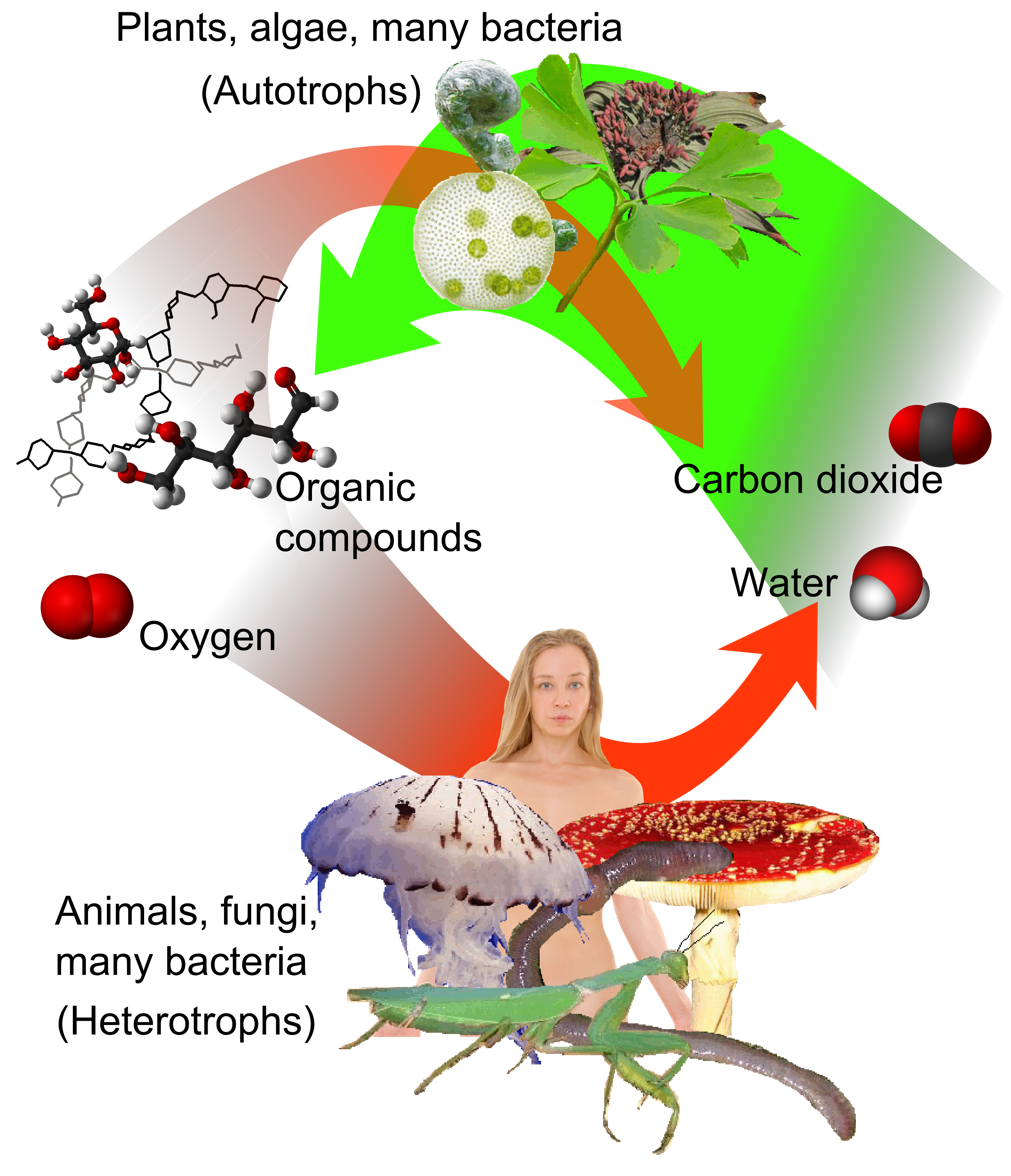
Cycle between autotrophs and heterotrophs. Autotrophs use light, carbon dioxide (CO_{2}), and water to form oxygen and complex organic compounds, mainly through the process of photosynthesis (green arrow). Both types of organisms use such compounds via cellular respiration to generate ATP and again form CO_{2} and water (two red arrows).

A heterotroph (/ˈhɛtərəˌtroʊf, -ˌtrɒf/; from Ancient Greek ἕτερος (héteros), meaning "other", and τροφή (trophḗ), meaning "nourishment") is an organism that cannot produce its own food, instead taking nutrition from other sources of organic carbon, mainly matter from other organisms. In the food chain, heterotrophs are primary, secondary and tertiary consumers, but not producers. Living organisms that are heterotrophic include most animals, all fungi, some bacteria and protists, and many parasitic plants. The term heterotroph arose in microbiology in 1946 as part of a classification of microorganisms based on their type of nutrition. The term is now used in many fields, such as ecology, in describing the food chain. Heterotrophs occupy the second and third trophic levels of the food chain while autotrophs occupy the first trophic level.

Heterotrophs may be subdivided according to their energy source. If the heterotroph uses chemical energy, it is a chemoheterotroph (e.g., humans and mushrooms). If it uses light for energy, then it is a photoheterotroph (e.g., Haloquadratum walsbyi and green non-sulfur bacteria).

Heterotrophs represent one of the two mechanisms of nutrition (trophic levels), the other being autotrophs (auto = self, troph = nutrition). Autotrophs use energy from sunlight (photoautotrophs) or oxidation of inorganic compounds (lithoautotrophs) to convert inorganic carbon dioxide to organic carbon compounds and energy to sustain their life. Comparing the two in basic terms, heterotrophs (such as animals) eat either autotrophs (such as plants) or other heterotrophs, or both.

Detritivores are heterotrophs which obtain nutrients by consuming detritus (decomposing plant and animal parts as well as feces). Saprotrophs (also called lysotrophs) are chemoheterotrophs that use extracellular digestion in processing decayed organic matter. The process is most often facilitated through the active transport of such materials through endocytosis within the internal mycelium and its constituent hyphae.

== Types ==
Heterotrophs can be organotrophs or lithotrophs.

- Organoheterotrophs exploit reduced carbon compounds (organics) as electron sources, such as carbohydrates, fats, and proteins from plants and animals.
- Lithoheterotrophs, on the other hand, use inorganic compounds such as ammonium, nitrite, or sulfur, to obtain electrons.

Another way of classifying different heterotrophs is by assigning them as chemotrophs or phototrophs. Phototrophs utilize light to obtain energy and carry out metabolic processes, whereas chemotrophs use the energy obtained by the oxidation of chemicals from their environment.

- Photoorganoheterotrophs, such as Rhodospirillaceae and purple non-sulfur bacteria synthesize organic compounds using sunlight coupled with oxidation of organic substances. They use organic compounds to build structures. They do not fix carbon dioxide and apparently do not have the Calvin cycle.
- Chemolithoheterotrophs like Oceanithermus profundus obtain energy from the oxidation of inorganic compounds, including hydrogen sulfide, elemental sulfur, thiosulfate, and molecular hydrogen.

Mixotrophs (or facultative chemolithotroph) can use either carbon dioxide or organic carbon as the carbon source, meaning that mixotrophs have the ability to use both heterotrophic and autotrophic methods. Although mixotrophs have the ability to grow under both heterotrophic and autotrophic conditions, C. vulgaris have higher biomass and lipid productivity when growing under heterotrophic compared to autotrophic conditions.

Heterotrophs, by consuming reduced carbon compounds, are able to use all the energy that they obtain from food for growth and reproduction, unlike autotrophs, which must use some of their energy for carbon fixation. Both heterotrophs and autotrophs alike are usually dependent on the metabolic activities of other organisms for nutrients other than carbon, including nitrogen, phosphorus, and sulfur, and can die from lack of food that supplies these nutrients. This applies not only to animals and fungi but also to bacteria.

== Origin and diversification ==
The chemical origin of life hypothesis suggests that life originated in a prebiotic soup with heterotrophs. The summary of this theory is as follows: early Earth had a highly reducing atmosphere and energy sources such as electrical energy in the form of lightning, which resulted in reactions that formed simple organic compounds, which further reacted to form more complex compounds and eventually resulted in life. Alternative theories of an autotrophic origin of life contradict this theory.

The theory of a chemical origin of life beginning with heterotrophic life was first proposed in 1924 by Alexander Ivanovich Oparin, and eventually published "The Origin of Life." It was independently proposed for the first time in English in 1929 by John Burdon Sanderson Haldane. While these authors agreed on the gasses present and the progression of events to a point, Oparin championed a progressive complexity of organic matter prior to the formation of cells, while Haldane had more considerations about the concept of genes as units of heredity and the possibility of light playing a role in chemical synthesis (autotrophy).

Evidence grew to support this theory in 1953, when Stanley Miller conducted an experiment in which he added gasses that were thought to be present on early Earth – water (H_{2}O), methane (CH_{4}), ammonia (NH_{3}), and hydrogen (H_{2}) – to a flask and stimulated them with electricity that resembled lightning present on early Earth. The experiment resulted in the discovery that early Earth conditions were supportive of the production of amino acids, with recent re-analyses of the data recognizing that over 40 different amino acids were produced, including several not currently used by life. This experiment heralded the beginning of the field of synthetic prebiotic chemistry, and is now known as the Miller–Urey experiment.

On early Earth, oceans and shallow waters were rich with organic molecules that could have been used by primitive heterotrophs. This method of obtaining energy was energetically favorable until organic carbon became more scarce than inorganic carbon, providing a potential evolutionary pressure to become autotrophic. Following the evolution of autotrophs, heterotrophs were able to utilize them as a food source instead of relying on the limited nutrients found in their environment. Eventually, autotrophic and heterotrophic cells were engulfed by these early heterotrophs and formed a symbiotic relationship. The endosymbiosis of autotrophic cells is suggested to have evolved into the chloroplasts while the endosymbiosis of smaller heterotrophs developed into the mitochondria, allowing the differentiation of tissues and development into multicellularity. This advancement allowed the further diversification of heterotrophs. Today, many heterotrophs and autotrophs also utilize mutualistic relationships that provide needed resources to both organisms. One example of this is the mutualism between corals and algae, where the former provides protection and necessary compounds for photosynthesis while the latter provides oxygen.

However this hypothesis is controversial as CO_{2} was the main carbon source at the early Earth, suggesting that early cellular life were autotrophs that relied upon inorganic substrates as an energy source and lived at alkaline hydrothermal vents or acidic geothermal ponds. Simple biomolecules transported from space was considered to have been either too reduced to have been fermented or too heterogeneous to support microbial growth. Heterotrophic microbes likely originated at low H_{2} partial pressures. Bases, amino acids, and ribose are considered to be the first fermentation substrates.

Heterotrophs are currently found in each domain of life: Bacteria, Archaea, and Eukarya. Domain Bacteria includes a variety of metabolic activity including photoheterotrophs, chemoheterotrophs, organotrophs, and heterolithotrophs. Within Domain Eukarya, kingdoms Fungi and Animalia are entirely heterotrophic, though most fungi absorb nutrients through their environment. Most organisms within Kingdom Protista are heterotrophic while Kingdom Plantae is almost entirely autotrophic (except for few myco-heterotrophic, parasitic and carnivorous plants). Lastly, Domain Archaea varies immensely in metabolic functions and contains many methods of heterotrophy.

== Flowchart ==
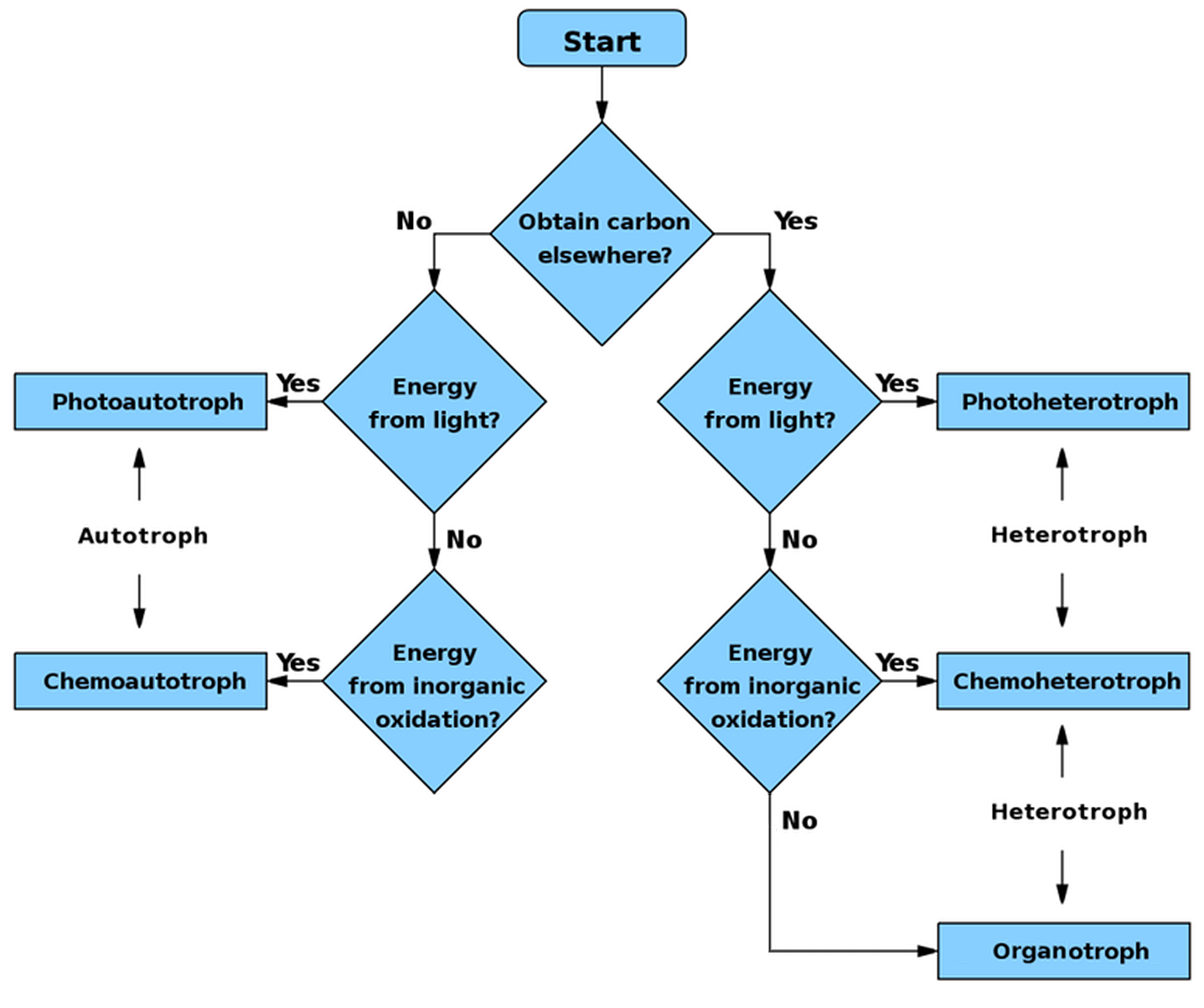
Flowchart to determine if a species is autotroph, heterotroph, or a subtype

- Autotroph
  - Chemoautotroph
  - Photoautotroph
- Heterotroph
  - Chemoheterotroph
  - Photoheterotroph

== Ecology ==
Many heterotrophs are chemoorganoheterotrophs that use organic carbon (e.g. glucose) as their carbon source, and organic chemicals (e.g. carbohydrates, lipids, proteins) as their electron sources. Heterotrophs function as consumers in food chain: they obtain these nutrients from saprotrophic, parasitic, or holozoic nutrients. They break down complex organic compounds (e.g., carbohydrates, fats, and proteins) produced by autotrophs into simpler compounds (e.g., carbohydrates into glucose, fats into fatty acids and glycerol, and proteins into amino acids). They release the chemical energy of nutrient molecules by oxidizing carbon and hydrogen atoms from carbohydrates, lipids, and proteins to carbon dioxide and water, respectively.

They can catabolize organic compounds by respiration, fermentation, or both. Fermenting heterotrophs are either facultative or obligate anaerobes that carry out fermentation in low oxygen environments, in which the production of ATP is commonly coupled with substrate-level phosphorylation and the production of end products (e.g. alcohol, CO_{2}, sulfide). These products can then serve as the substrates for other bacteria in the anaerobic digestion, and be converted into CO_{2} and CH_{4}, which is an important step for the carbon cycle for removing organic fermentation products from anaerobic environments. Heterotrophs can undergo respiration, in which ATP production is coupled with oxidative phosphorylation. This leads to the release of oxidized carbon wastes such as CO_{2} and reduced wastes like H_{2}O, H_{2}S, or N_{2}O into the atmosphere. Heterotrophic microbes' respiration and fermentation account for a large portion of the release of CO_{2} into the atmosphere, making it available for autotrophs as a source of nutrient and plants as a cellulose synthesis substrate.

Respiration in heterotrophs is often accompanied by mineralization, the process of converting organic compounds to inorganic forms. When the organic nutrient source taken in by the heterotroph contains essential elements such as N, S, P in addition to C, H, and O, they are often removed first to proceed with the oxidation of organic nutrient and production of ATP via respiration. S and N in organic carbon source are transformed into H_{2}S and NH_{4}^{+} through desulfurylation and deamination, respectively. Heterotrophs also allow for dephosphorylation as part of decomposition. The conversion of N and S from organic form to inorganic form is a critical part of the nitrogen and sulfur cycle. H_{2}S formed from desulfurylation is further oxidized by lithotrophs and phototrophs while NH_{4}^{+} formed from deamination is further oxidized by lithotrophs to the forms available to plants. Heterotrophs' ability to mineralize essential elements is critical to plant survival.

Most opisthokonts and prokaryotes are heterotrophic; in particular, all animals and fungi are heterotrophs. Some animals, such as corals, form symbiotic relationships with autotrophs and obtain organic carbon in this way. Furthermore, some parasitic plants have also turned fully or partially heterotrophic, while carnivorous plants consume animals to augment their nitrogen supply while remaining autotrophic.

Animals are classified as heterotrophs by ingestion, fungi are classified as heterotrophs by absorption.

== Heterotroph Impacts on Biogeochemical Cycles ==
Heterotrophs, organisms that obtain energy and carbon by consuming organic matter, are vital parts of Earth's biogeochemical cycles particularly in the carbon, nitrogen, and sulfur cycles. Their metabolic activities impact the processing and cycling of elements through ecosystems and the biosphere.

Heterotrophs are key players in the carbon cycle, acting as both consumers and decomposers. They release carbon dioxide (CO_{2}) into the atmosphere through respiration, contributing to a large portion of carbon dioxide emissions. This process makes carbon available for autotrophs, who can fix carbon through photosynthesis or chemosynthesis. This circulation supports the continuous cycling of carbon between organic and inorganic forms.

Heterotrophic organisms contribute to key processes in the nitrogen cycle like ammonification, the conversion of organic nitrogen to ammonia, and denitrification, the reduction of nitrate and the release of nitrogen gas to the atmosphere. These processes can be known as secondary metabolism in heterotrophs. Heterotrophic microorganisms are essential in the mineralization of organic compounds containing nitrogen. Through deamination, they convert organic nitrogen to ammonium (NH4+), which can be further oxidized by lithotrophs into forms available to plants. Similarly, desulfurylation by heterotrophs transforms organic sulfur into hydrogen sulfide (H_{2}S), which is then oxidized by lithotrophs and phototrophs, contributing to the sulfur cycle.

The ability of heterotrophs to break down complex organic compounds is fundamental to nutrient cycling in ecosystems. By decomposing dead organic matter, they release essential elements like phosphorus through dephosphorylation, making these nutrients available for other organisms. This process is critical for maintaining soil fertility and supporting plant growth. Heterotrops connect the flow of energy and organic matter across ecosystems. Their biological processes link with atmospheric, chemical and geological systems.

Heterotrophs form intricate relationships with autotrophs in ecosystems. While they depend on autotrophs for energy-rich organic compounds, heterotrophs support autotrophic growth by releasing minerals and carbon dioxide (CO_{2}). This interdependence is exemplified in symbiotic relationships, such as those between corals and algae, where nutrient exchange benefits both partners. Their metabolic processes depend on each other and traces of organic compounds.

The biogeochemical activities of heterotrophs are thus integral to ecosystem functioning, influencing the availability of nutrients, the composition of the atmosphere, and the productivity of both terrestrial and aquatic environments.
