= Methylosinus sporium =

Scientific classification
- Domain: Bacteria
- Kingdom: Pseudomonadati
- Phylum: Pseudomonadota
- Class: Alphaproteobacteria
- Order: Hyphomicrobiales
- Family: Methylocystaceae
- Genus: Methylosinus
- Species: M. oligotropha

Binomial name
- Methylosinus oligotropha Bowman et al. 1993

Type strain
- 5, ACM 3306, ATCC 35069, DSM 17706, IMET 10545, NCIB 11126, NCIMB 11126, UNIQEM 60

Species of bacterium

Methylopila oligotropha is a methanotroph bacterium species from the genus of Methylopila which has been isolated from a groundwater aquifer.
