= Methylocystis bryophila =

Scientific classification
- Domain: Bacteria
- Kingdom: Pseudomonadati
- Phylum: Pseudomonadota
- Class: Alphaproteobacteria
- Order: Hyphomicrobiales
- Family: Methylocystaceae
- Genus: Methylocystis
- Species: M. bryophila

Binomial name
- Methylocystis bryophila Belova et al. 2013

Type strain
- DSM 21852, H2s, VKM B-2545

Species of bacterium

Methylocystis bryophila is a Gram-negative, aerobic, facultatively methanotrophic and non-motile bacterium species from the genus of Methylocystis which has been isolated from Sphagnum peat from the Großer Teufelssee in Germany.
