= Coarse woody debris =

Dead wood in terrestrial environments

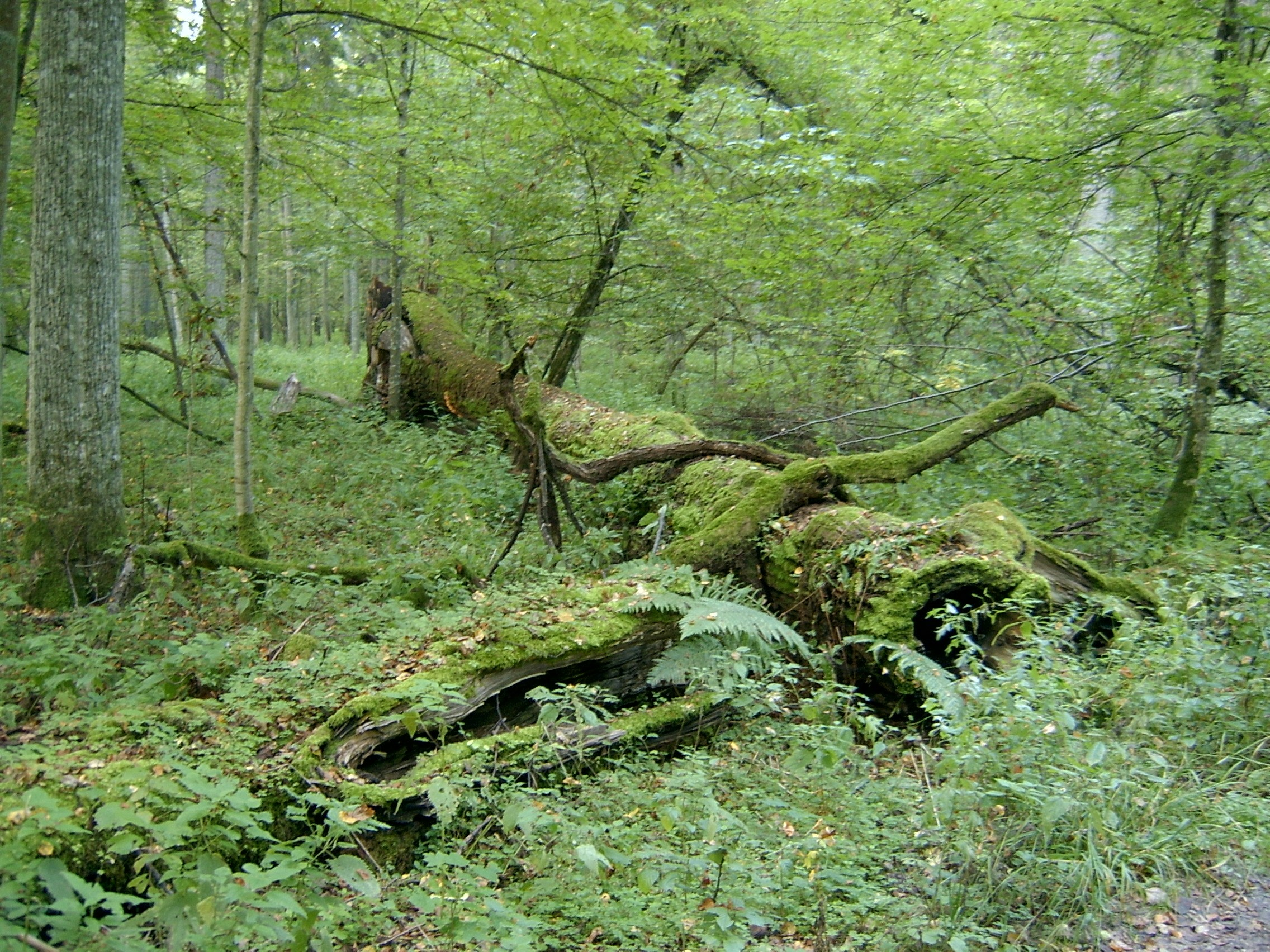
Coarse woody debris in Białowieża Forest, Poland

Coarse woody debris (CWD) or coarse woody habitat (CWH) refers to fallen dead trees and the remains of large branches on the ground in forests and in rivers or wetlands. A dead standing tree, known as a snag, provides many of the same functions as coarse woody debris. The minimum size required for woody debris to be defined as "coarse" varies by author, ranging from 2.5–20 cm (1–8 in) in diameter.

Since the 1970s, forest managers worldwide have considered it best environmental practice to allow dead trees and woody debris to remain in woodlands, recycling nutrients trapped in the wood and providing food and habitat for a wide range of organisms, thereby improving biodiversity. The amount of coarse woody debris is an important criterion for the evaluation and restoration of temperate deciduous forest. Coarse woody debris is also important in wetlands, particularly in deltas where woody debris accumulates.

== Sources ==
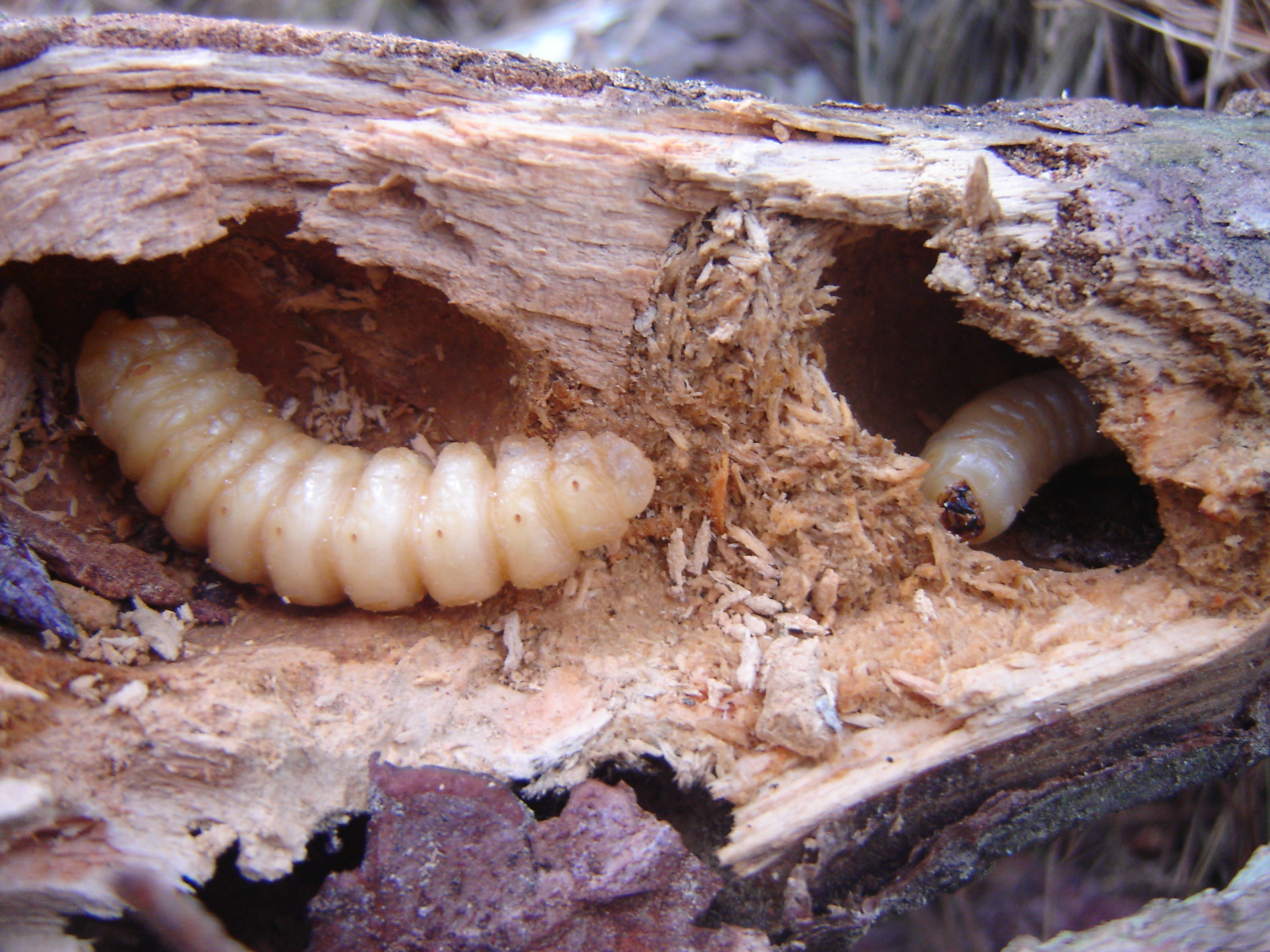
Huhu beetle larvae (Prionoplus reticularis) consuming CWD in New Zealand

Coarse woody debris comes from natural tree mortality, plant pathology, insects, wildfire, logging, windthrows and floods.

Ancient, or old growth, forest, with its dead trees and woody remains lying where they fell to feed new vegetation, constitutes the ideal woodland in terms of recycling and regeneration. In healthy temperate forests, dead wood comprises up to thirty per cent of all woody biomass. In recent British studies, woods managed for timber had between a third and a seventh less fallen debris than unmanaged woods that had been left undisturbed for many years, while in recently coppiced woods the amount of CWD was almost zero.

In old growth Douglas fir forests of the Pacific Northwest of North America, CWD concentrations were found to be from 72 metric tons/hectare (64,000 pounds/acre) in drier sites to 174 t/ha (155,000 lb/acre) in moister sites. Australian native forests have mean CWD concentrations ranging from 19 t/ha (17,000 lb/acre) to 134 t/ha (120,000 lb/acre), depending on forest type.

== Benefits ==
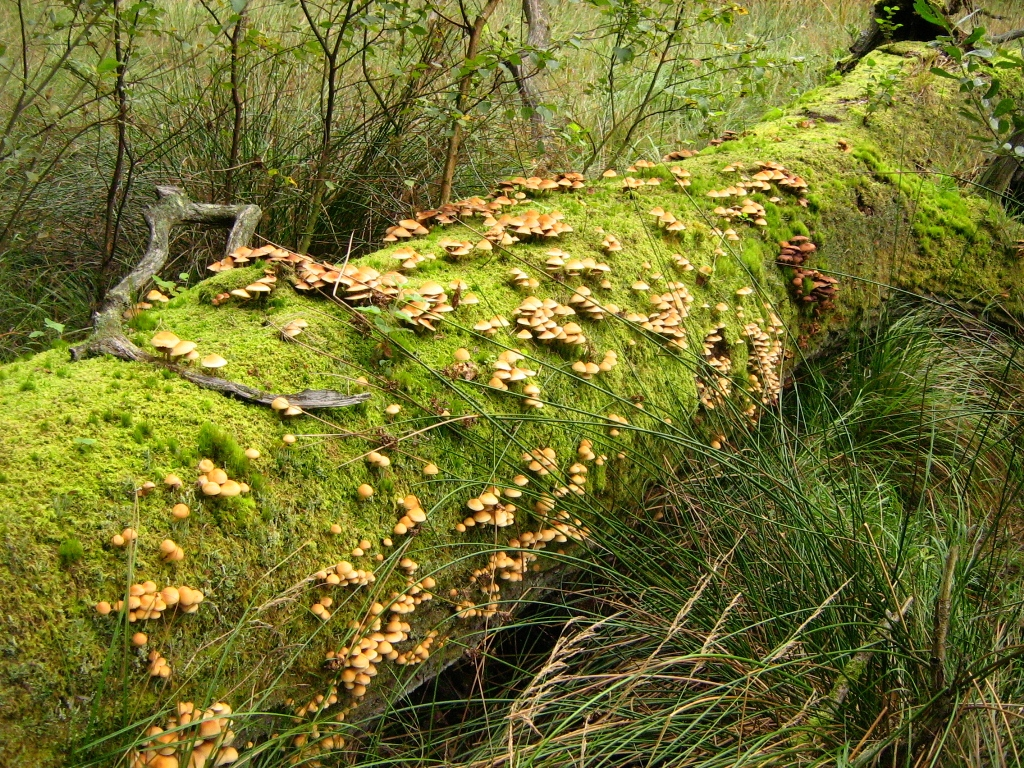
Fungi sprouting from fallen log, Germany

=== Nutrient cycling ===
Coarse woody debris and its subsequent decomposition recycles nutrients that are essential for living organisms, such as carbon, nitrogen, potassium, and phosphorus. Saprotrophic fungi and detritivores such as bacteria and insects directly consume dead wood, releasing nutrients by converting them into other forms of organic matter which may then be consumed by other organisms. It has almost no physiologically important nutrients, so must be first enriched for consumption by transport of nutrients from outside. Thus CWD is important actor contributing to soil nutrients cycles. CWD, while itself not particularly rich in nitrogen, contributes nitrogen to the ecosystem by acting as a host for nonsymbiotic free-living nitrogen-fixing bacteria.

Scientific studies show that coarse woody debris can be a significant contributor to biological carbon sequestration. Trees store atmospheric carbon in their wood using photosynthesis. Once the trees die, fungi and other saprotrophs transfer some of that carbon from CWD into the soil. This sequestration can continue in old-growth forests for hundreds of years.

=== Habitat ===
By providing both food and microhabitats for many species, coarse woody debris helps to maintain the biodiversity of forest ecosystems. Up to forty percent of all forest fauna is dependent on CWD. Studies in western North America showed that only five per cent of living trees consisted of living cells by volume, whereas in dead wood it was as high as forty percent by volume, mainly fungi and bacteria. Colonizing organisms that live on the remains of cambium and sapwood of dead trees aid decomposition and attract predators that prey on them and so continue the chain of metabolizing the biomass.

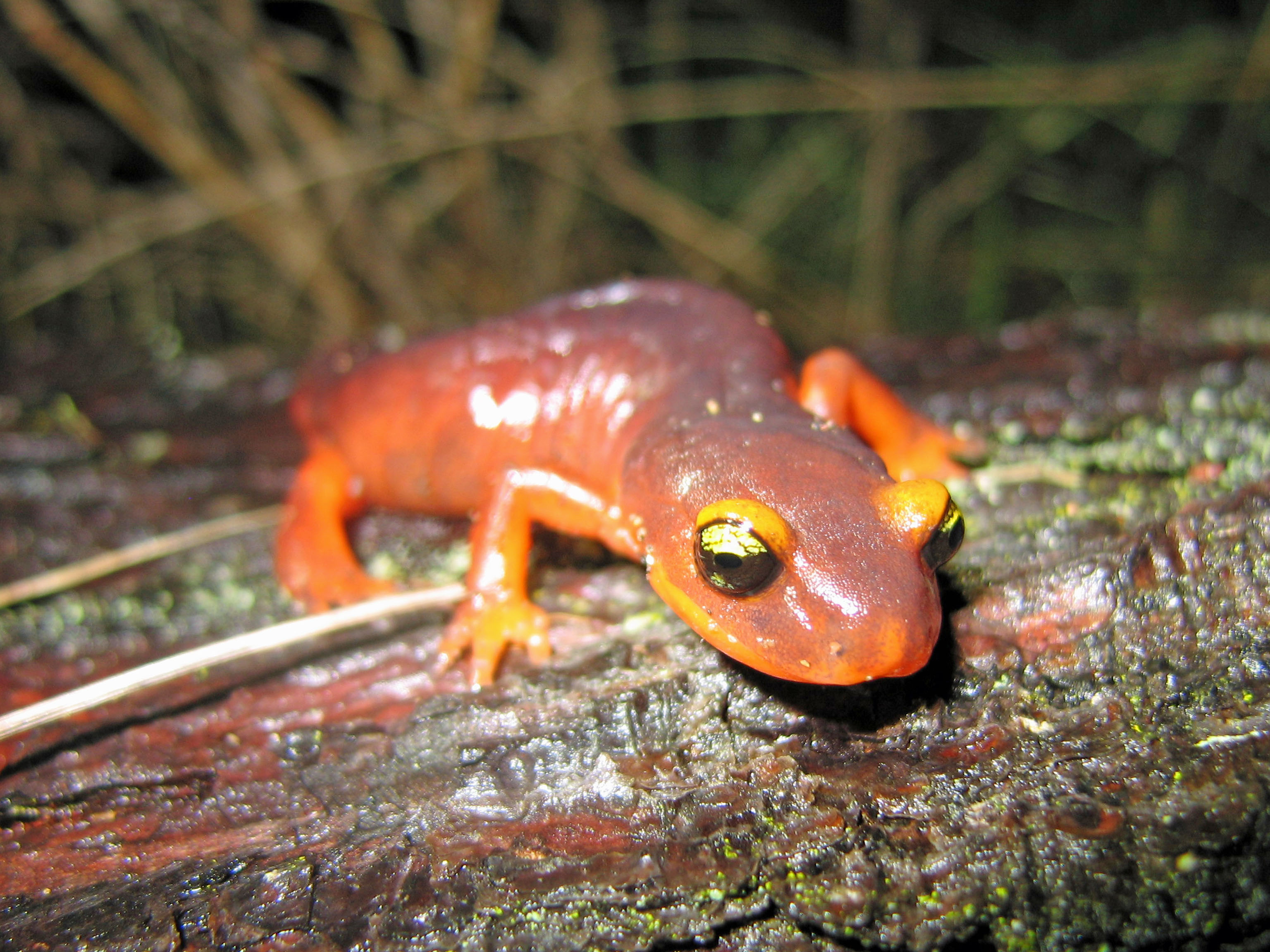
Ensatina eschscholtzii, a species of salamander associated with CWD in western North America

The list of organisms dependent on CWD for habitat or as a food source includes bacteria, fungi, lichens, mosses and other plants, and in the animal kingdom, invertebrates such as termites, ants, beetles, and snails, amphibians such as salamanders, reptiles such as the slow-worm, as well as birds and small mammals. One third of all woodland birds live in the cavities of dead tree trunks. Woodpeckers, tits, chickadees, and owls all live in dead trees, and grouse shelter behind woody debris.

Some plants use coarse woody debris as habitat. Mosses and lichens may cover logs, while ferns and trees may regenerate on the top of logs. Large fragments of CWD that provide such habitat for herbs, shrubs, and trees are called nurse logs. CWD can also protect young plants from herbivory damage by acting as barriers to browsing animals. The persistence of coarse woody debris can shelter organisms during a large disturbance to the ecosystem such as wildfire or logging.

=== Rivers and wetlands ===
Fallen debris and trees in streams provide shelter for fish, amphibians and mammals by modifying the flow of water and sediment. Turtles of many species may also use coarse woody debris for basking. Musk turtles may lay their eggs under logs near wetlands.

=== Soil ===
Coarse woody debris, particularly on slopes, stabilizes soils by slowing downslope movement of organic matter and mineral soil. Leaves and other debris collect behind CWD, allowing for decomposition to occur. Infiltration of precipitation is improved as well. During dry weather, CWD slows evaporation of soil moisture and provides damp microhabitats for moisture-sensitive organisms.

== Wildfire ==
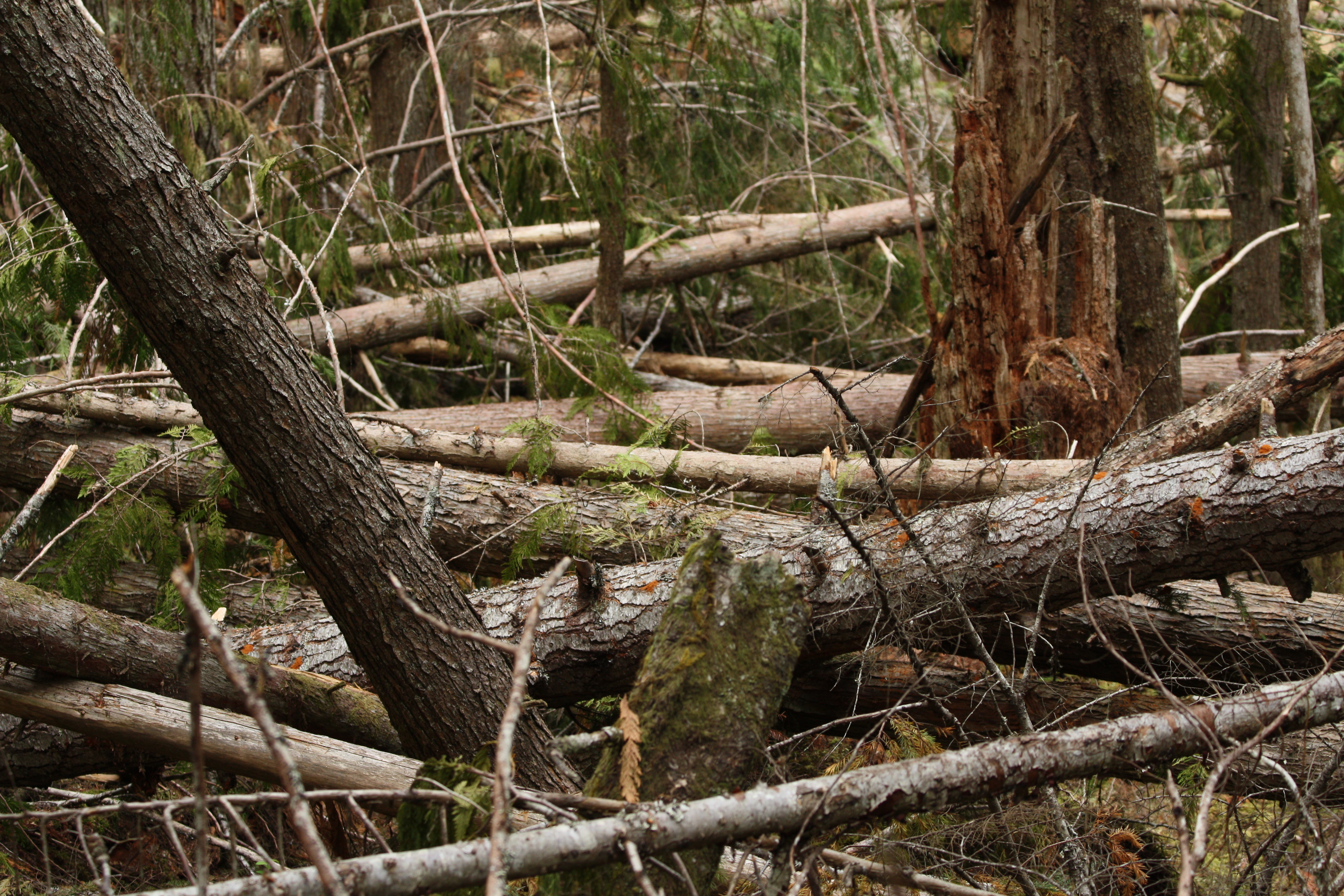
Coarse woody debris may contribute to the intensity of wildfire.

In fire-prone forests, coarse woody debris can be a significant fuel during a wildfire. High amounts of fuels can lead to increased fire severity and size. CWD may be managed to reduce fuel levels, particularly in forests where fire exclusion has resulted in the buildup of fuels. Reductions in CWD for fire safety should be balanced with the retention of CWD for habitat and other benefits. CWD of 3 to 8 inches (8 to 20 cm) in diameter is classified as 1000-hour fuel by fire managers, referring to the amount of time needed for the moisture content in the wood to come to equilibrium with the surrounding environment.

== Regional examples ==
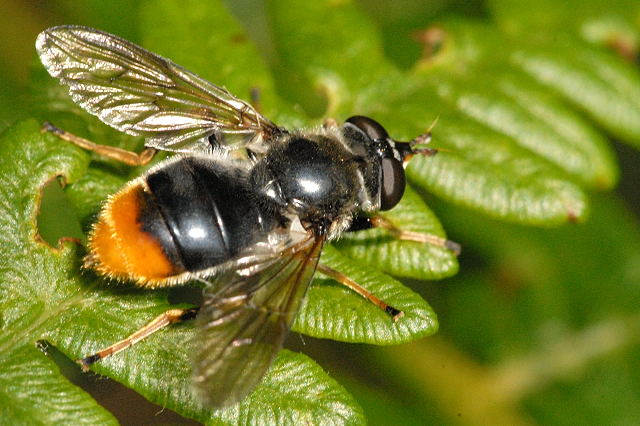
Blera fallax, Belgium

In Glen Affric, Scotland, the Trees for Life group found the black tinder fungus beetle (Bolitothorus reticulatus) is dependent on a particular fungus (Fomes fomentarius), which itself grows only on dead birch. Another insect, the pine hoverfly (Blera fallax), requires rotting Scots pine in order to reproduce.

In the temperate deciduous forests of eastern North America, CWD provides habitat ranging from salamanders to ferns. It is an important indicator for evaluating and restoring this type of forest.

In certain subtropical areas such as Australia where bushfire constitutes a major hazard, the amount of CWD left standing or lying is determined by what may be considered safe in the course of reasonable fire prevention. When fires occur, some invertebrates find shelter either within or beneath dead tree logs.

In Canada, bears seek out dead tree logs to tear open and look for and feed on ants and beetles, a fact that has encouraged the authorities to reserve a sufficient amount of coarse woody debris for these purposes. In North America, too, CWD is often used as barriers to prevent browsing deer and elk from damaging young trees.

== See also ==
- Large woody debris
- Plant litter
- Slash (logging)
- Soil life
- Tree hollow
