= Methylocystis rosea =

Methylocystis bryophila

Scientific classification
- Domain: Bacteria
- Kingdom: Pseudomonadati
- Phylum: Pseudomonadota
- Class: Alphaproteobacteria
- Order: Hyphomicrobiales
- Family: Methylocystaceae
- Genus: Methylocystis
- Species: M. bryophila

Binomial name
- Methylocystis bryophila Wartiainen et al. 2006

Type strain
- ATCC BAA-1196, DSM 17261, Hoefman R-43160, LMG 27835, SV97

Synonyms
- Methylocystis rhodochrous

Species of bacterium

Methylocystis rosea is a methanotrophic, Gram-negative, rod-shaped, non-spore-forming and non-motile bacterium species from the genus of Methylocystis which has been isolated from arctic wetland soil on the Svalbard Islands in Norway.
