= Methylocystis echinoides =

Scientific classification
- Domain: Bacteria
- Kingdom: Pseudomonadati
- Phylum: Pseudomonadota
- Class: Alphaproteobacteria
- Order: Hyphomicrobiales
- Family: Methylocystaceae
- Genus: Methylocystis
- Species: M. echinoides

Binomial name
- Methylocystis echinoides (ex Gal'chenko et al. 1977) Bowman et al. 1993

Type strain
- IC493s/5, IMET 10491, LMG 27198, NCIMB 13100, UNIQEM 25, VKM B-2128

Synonyms
- "Methylocystis echinoides" Gal'chenko et al. 1977

Species of bacterium

Methylocystis echinoides is a bacterium species from the genus of Methylocystis.
