= Methylocystis parvus =

Scientific classification
- Domain: Bacteria
- Kingdom: Pseudomonadati
- Phylum: Pseudomonadota
- Class: Alphaproteobacteria
- Order: Hyphomicrobiales
- Family: Methylocystaceae
- Genus: Methylocystis
- Species: M. parvus

Binomial name
- Methylocystis parvus Bowman et al. 1993

Type strain
- ACM 3309, ATCC 35066, IMET 10483, NCIMB 11129, OBBP, OBBP ACM3309, UNIQEM 38, VKM B-2129

Synonyms
- Methylocystis parva

Species of bacterium

Methylocystis parvus is a methylotroph (methane oxidizing) bacterium species from the genus of Methylocystis.
