= Methylocystis hirsuta =

Scientific classification
- Domain: Bacteria
- Kingdom: Pseudomonadati
- Phylum: Pseudomonadota
- Class: Alphaproteobacteria
- Order: Hyphomicrobiales
- Family: Methylocystaceae
- Genus: Methylocystis
- Species: M. hirsuta

Binomial name
- Methylocystis hirsuta Lindner et al. 2007

Type strain
- ATCC BAA-1344, CSC1, DSM 18500, Hoefman R-43155, LMG 27832

Species of bacterium

Methylocystis hirsuta is a Gram-negative, aerobic and methanotroph bacterium species from the genus of Methylocystis which has been isolated from a groundwater aquifer from Mountain View in California in the United States.
