= Howard Dalton =

British microbiologist

Sir Howard Dalton FRS
- Born: 8 February 1944; New Malden
- Died: 12 January 2008 (aged 63)
- Education: Queen Elizabeth College; University of Sussex
- Awards: Knight Bachelor
- Scientific career
- Workplaces: University of Warwick
- Thesis: Physiological Aspects of Growth of Azotobacter chroococcum in Continuous Culture (1968)
- Doctoral advisor: John Postgate

Sir Howard Dalton, FRS (8 February 1944 – 12 January 2008) was a British microbiologist. He served as the Chief Scientific Advisor to the UK's Department for Environment, Food and Rural Affairs (Defra) from March 2002 to September 2007.

== Education ==
Born in New Malden, Dalton was educated at Raynes Park County Grammar School and Queen Elizabeth College, University of London (now part of King's College London). He graduated in 1965 and went on to study at the University of Sussex with John Postgate, obtaining his PhD in 1968.

== Personal life ==
He was an atheist.

== Career and research ==
He worked as a postdoctoral researcher at Purdue University and the University of Sussex before joining the University of Warwick in 1973 as a lecturer in Biological Sciences. He was promoted to Professor in 1983. Dalton's main fields of interest concerned the physiology, genetics and biochemistry of organisms exhibiting methanotrophy. One of his main research interests was the particulate methane monooxygenase enzyme. His model organisms included Methylococcus capsulatus (Bath) and Methylosinus trichosporium OB3b.

He served as Chair of Biological Sciences at Warwick from 1999 to 2002 before being appointed to DEFRA. He returned full-time to the University in October 2007, and continued working there until his death.

== Awards and honours ==
He was elected a Fellow of the Royal Society (FRS) in 1993, was President of the Society for General Microbiology from 1997 to 2000, and was awarded the Leeuwenhoek medal lecture of the Royal Society in 2000. He was named a Knight Bachelor in the 2007 New Years Honours list. He was President of the Marine Biological Association from 2007 to 2008. He died suddenly in Royal Leamington Spa on 12 January 2008.
