= Albibacter helveticus =

Scientific classification
- Domain: Bacteria
- Kingdom: Pseudomonadati
- Phylum: Pseudomonadota
- Class: Alphaproteobacteria
- Order: Hyphomicrobiales
- Family: Methylocystaceae
- Genus: Albibacter
- Species: A. helveticus

Binomial name
- Albibacter helveticus (Doronina et al. 2000) Yang et al. 2016

Type strain
- CIP 106788, DM9, VKM B-2175, VKM B-2189

Synonyms
- Methylopila helvetica Doronina et al. 2000

Species of bacterium

Albibacter helveticus is a Gram-negative, aerobic, facultatively methanotrophic, non-spore-forming, neutrophilic and mesophilic bacterium species from the genus Albibacter which has been isolated from soil from Switzerland.
