= Halobellus =

Scientific classification
- Domain: Archaea
- Kingdom: Methanobacteriati
- Phylum: Methanobacteriota
- Class: Halobacteria
- Order: Haloferacales
- Family: Haloferacaceae
- Genus: Halobellus; Cui et al. 2011

Type species
- Halobellus clavatus Cui et al. 2011

Species
- See text

Genus of archaeon

Halobellus (common abbreviation: Hbs.) is a genus of halophilic archaea.

== Phylogeny ==
The currently accepted taxonomy is based on the List of Prokaryotic names with Standing in Nomenclature (LPSN) and National Center for Biotechnology Information (NCBI).

16S rRNA based LTP_07_2026

- - - Halobellus rubicundus Hwang et al. 2025
    - - Haloquadratum walsbyi Burns et al. 2007
      - - Halobellus~1
          - Halobellus inordinatus Qui et al. 2013
          - Halobellus ramosii Perez-Davo et al. 2015
  - - Halobellus s.s.
      - - H. marinus Zhu et al. 2025
        - - H. clavatus Cui et al. 2011
          - H. ruber Hwang et al. 2022
      - - H. limi Cui et al. 2012
        - - H. ordinarius Zhu et al. 2025
          - - - H. captivus Chen et al. 2020
              - H. rufus Cha et al. 2014
            - - H. salinus Cui et al. 2012
              - - H. litoreus Zhao et al 2014
                - H. rarus Zhang et al. 2014

53 marker proteins based GTDB 11-RS232

- Haloquadratum
  - H. walsbyi
  - - - Halobellus ruber
      - Halobellus salinus
    - - - Halobellus clavatus
        - Halobellus rubicundus
      - - - Halobellus marinus
          - Halobellus ordinarius
        - - Halobellus inordinatus [Halobellus ramosii]
          - - - Halobellus rufus
              - - Halobellus captivus
                - Halobellus salinisoli Cui et al. 2025
            - - Halobellus litoreus
              - - Halobellus limi
                - Halobellus rarus

== See also ==
- List of Archaea genera
