= Methylopila oligotropha =

Methylocystis oligotropha

Scientific classification
- Domain: Bacteria
- Kingdom: Pseudomonadati
- Phylum: Pseudomonadota
- Class: Alphaproteobacteria
- Order: Hyphomicrobiales
- Family: Methylocystaceae
- Genus: Methylopila
- Species: M. oligotropha

Binomial name
- Methylopila oligotropha Poroshina et al. 2014

Type strain
- CCUG 63805, 2395A, VKM B-2788

Species of bacterium

Methylopila oligotropha is a bacterium species from the genus Methylopila which has been isolated from soil from a salt mine in Solikamsk in Russia.
