= Albibacter methylovorans =

Scientific classification
- Domain: Bacteria
- Kingdom: Pseudomonadati
- Phylum: Pseudomonadota
- Class: Alphaproteobacteria
- Order: Hyphomicrobiales
- Family: Methylocystaceae
- Genus: Albibacter
- Species: A. methylovorans

Binomial name
- Albibacter methylovorans Doronina et al. 2001

Type strain
- DM10, DSM 13819, DSM 22840, VKM B-2236

Synonyms
- Albobacter methylovorans

Species of bacterium

Albibacter methylovorans is a methylotrophic, aerobic and facultatively autotrophic bacteria from the genus Microvirga which has been isolated from dichloromethane contaminated ground water in Switzerland.

== Etymology ==
New Latin noun methylum (from French méthyle, back-formation from French méthylène, coined from Greek noun methu, wine and Greek noun hulē, wood), the methyl group; New Latin pref. methylo-, pertaining to the methyl radical; Latin participle adjective vorans, devouring, eating; New Latin participle adjective methylovorans, digesting methyl groups.)
