= Methylopila henanensis =

Methylocystis henanensis

Scientific classification
- Domain: Bacteria
- Kingdom: Pseudomonadati
- Phylum: Pseudomonadota
- Class: Alphaproteobacteria
- Order: Hyphomicrobiales
- Family: Methylocystaceae
- Genus: Methylopila
- Species: M. henanensis

Binomial name
- Methylopila henanensis corrig. Wang et al. 2015

Synonyms
- Methylopila henanense Wang et al. 2015

Species of bacterium

Methylopila henanensis is a Gram-negative bacterium species from the genus Methylopila with a single flagellum.
