= Hansschlegelia beijingensis =

Scientific classification
- Domain: Bacteria
- Kingdom: Pseudomonadati
- Phylum: Pseudomonadota
- Class: Alphaproteobacteria
- Order: Hyphomicrobiales
- Family: Methylocystaceae
- Genus: Hansschlegelia
- Species: H. beijingensis

Binomial name
- Hansschlegelia beijingensis Zou et al. 2013

Type strain
- ACCC 05759, DSM 25481, PG04

Species of bacterium

Hansschlegelia beijingensis is a Gram-negative, aerobic and rod-shaped bacterium species from the genus Hansschlegelia which has been isolated from rhizosphere soil from a watermelon plant in Beijing in the Daxing District in China.
