= Methylopila jiangsuensis =

Methylocystis jiangsuensis

Scientific classification
- Domain: Bacteria
- Kingdom: Pseudomonadati
- Phylum: Pseudomonadota
- Class: Alphaproteobacteria
- Order: Hyphomicrobiales
- Family: Methylocystaceae
- Genus: Methylopila
- Species: M. jiangsuensis

Binomial name
- Methylopila jiangsuensis Li et al. 2011

Type strain
- ACCC 05406, DSM 22718, JZL-4, VKM B-2555

Species of bacterium

Methylopila jiangsuensis is a Gram-negative, aerobic, facultatively methanotrophic and non-spore-forming bacterium species from the genus Methylopila which has been isolated from activated sludge from a waste water treatment plant from Yangzhou in the Jiangsu Province in China.
