= Methylosinus-1 RNA motif =

Methylosinus-1
- Consensus secondary structure and sequence conservation of Methylosinus-1 RNA

Identifiers
- Symbol: Methylosinus-1
- Rfam: RF03108

Other data
- RNA type: Gene; sRNA
- SO: SO:0001263
- PDB structures: PDBe

The Methylosinus-1 RNA motif is a conserved RNA structure that was discovered by bioinformatics. Methylosinus-1 motif RNAs are found, as of 2018, only in the organism Methylosinus trichosporium strain OB3b. The motif occurs in six locations in this organism. A possible homolog also occurs in Methylosinus rosea SV97.

Methylosinus-1 RNAs likely function in trans as small RNAs. Because available examples of the Methylosinus-1 motif are so closely related to one another, there is limited scope to analyze the secondary structure of the RNA based on covariation. Therefore, it is possible that additional conserved structural elements are a part of Methylosinus-1 RNAs, but that these elements have not yet been detected.
