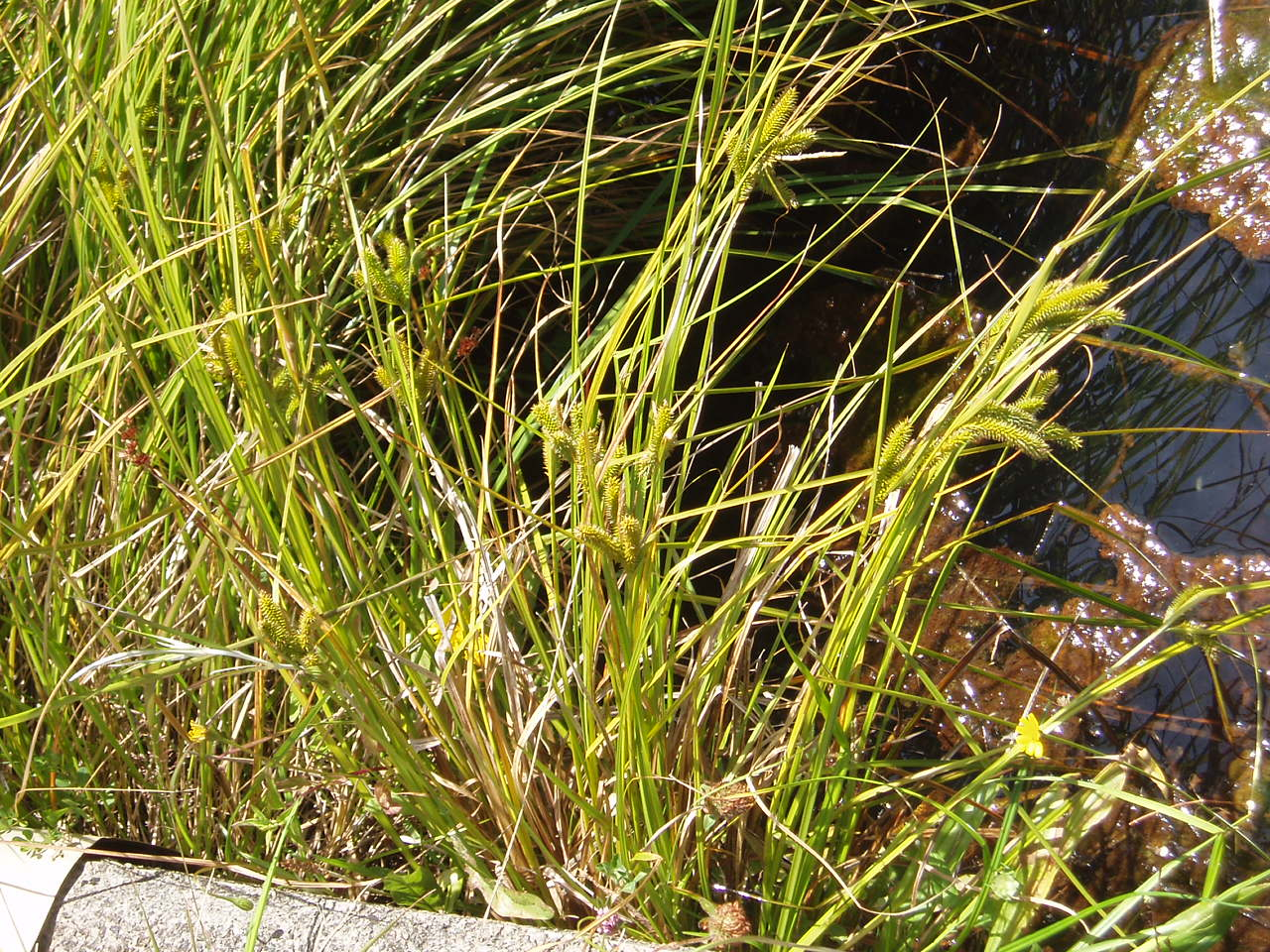

Scientific classification
- Kingdom: Plantae
- Clade: Tracheophytes
- Clade: Angiosperms
- Clade: Monocots
- Clade: Commelinids
- Order: Poales
- Family: Cyperaceae
- Genus: Carex
- Species: C. maorica

Binomial name
- Carex maorica Hamlin

= Carex maorica =

Species of grass-like plant

Carex maorica, commonly known as Māori sedge, is a sedge that is found on the North Island and South Island of New Zealand.

The sedge has a tufted habit and is green to yellow green in colour. The smooth to slightly scabrid culms have a trigonous cross-section and are typically 150 to 700 mm (5.9 to 27.6 in) in length and 1 to 2.5 mm (0.039 to 0.098 in) wide. The leaves can have a length up to 1 m (3 ft 3 in) and a width of 2 to 7 mm (0.079 to 0.276 in).

== See also ==
- List of Carex species
