= Methylopila capsulata =

Methylocystis capsulata

Scientific classification
- Domain: Bacteria
- Kingdom: Pseudomonadati
- Phylum: Pseudomonadota
- Class: Alphaproteobacteria
- Order: Hyphomicrobiales
- Family: Methylocystaceae
- Genus: Methylopila
- Species: M. capsulata

Binomial name
- Methylopila capsulata Doronina et al. 1998

Type strain
- ATCC 700716, DSM 6130, IM1, NCIMB 13895, VKM B-1606

Species of bacterium

Methylopila capsulata is a Gram-negative, aerobic, facultatively methylotrophic, non-spore-forming and motile bacterium species from the genus Methylopila which has been isolated from soil from Tashkent in Uzbekistan.
