= Hansschlegelia zhihuaiae =

Scientific classification
- Domain: Bacteria
- Kingdom: Pseudomonadati
- Phylum: Pseudomonadota
- Class: Alphaproteobacteria
- Order: Hyphomicrobiales
- Family: Methylocystaceae
- Genus: Hansschlegelia
- Species: H. zhihuaiae

Binomial name
- Hansschlegelia zhihuaiae Wen et al. 2011

Type strain
- CCTCC AB 206143, DSM 18984, KCTC 12880, S 113

Species of bacterium

Hansschlegelia zhihuaiae is a Gram-negative and aerobic bacterium species from the genus Hansschlegelia which has been isolated from polluted farmland soil in the Jiangsu Province in China.
