= Habit (biology) =

Characteristic growth or behavior

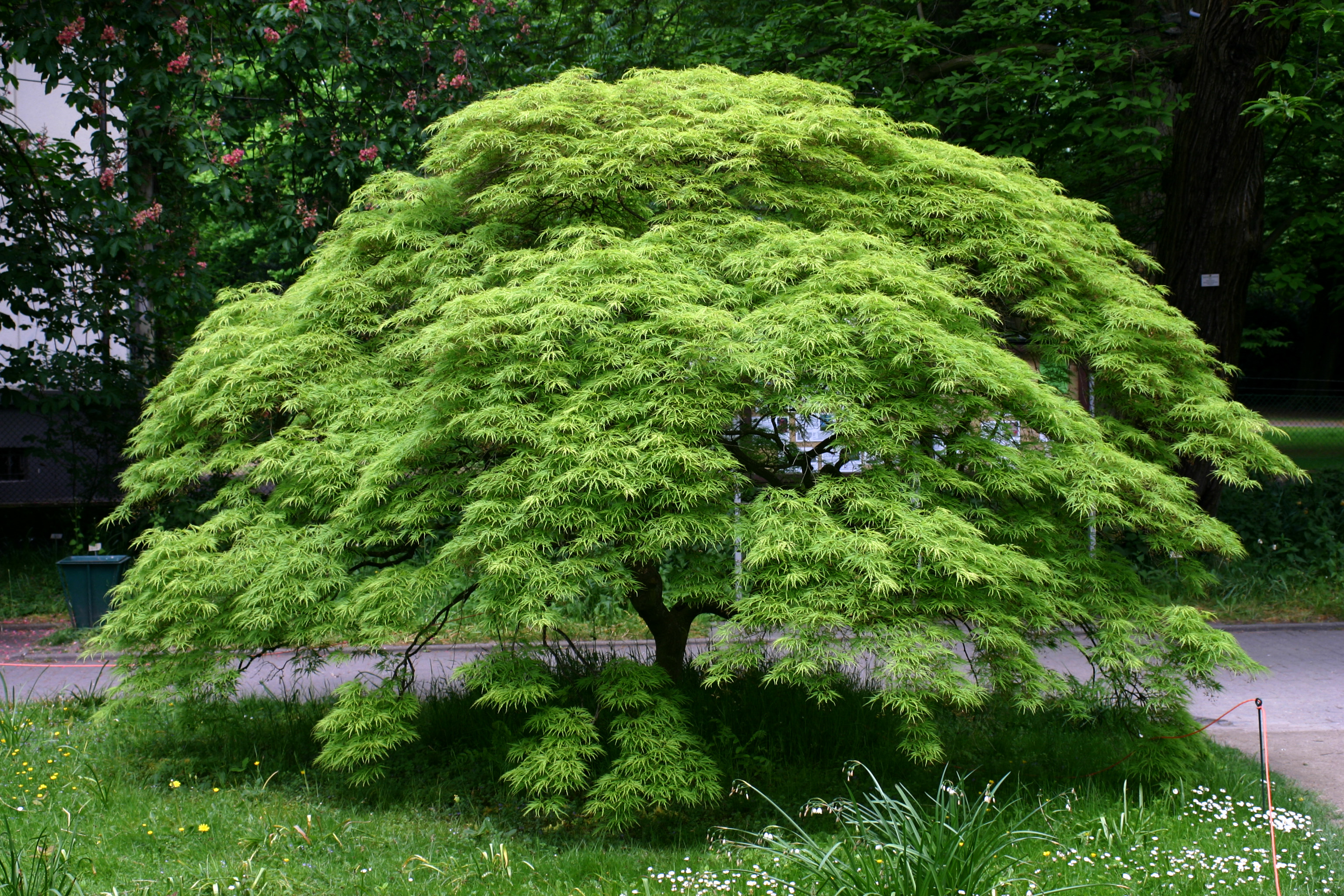
This cultivar of Japanese maple has a dome-like habit.

Habit, equivalent to habitus in some applications in biology, refers variously to aspects of behaviour or structure, as follows:

- In zoology (particularly in ethology), habit usually refers to aspects of more or less predictable behaviour, instinctive or otherwise, though it also has broader application. Habitus refers to the characteristic form or morphology of a species.
- In botany, the plant habit is the characteristic form in which a given species of plant grows.

== Behavior ==
In zoology, habit (not to be confused with habitus as described below) usually refers to a specific behavior pattern, either adopted, learned, pathological, innate, or directly related to physiology. For example:

- ...the [cat] was in the habit of springing upon the [door knocker] in order to gain admission...
- If these sensitive parrots are kept in cages, they quickly take up the habit of feather plucking.
- The spider monkey has an arboreal habit and rarely ventures onto the forest floor.
- The brittle star has the habit of breaking off arms as a means of defense.

Mode of life (or lifestyle, modus vivendi) is a concept related to habit, and it is sometimes referred to as the habit of an animal. It may refer to the locomotor capabilities, as in "(motile habit", sessile, errant, sedentary), feeding behaviour and mechanisms, nutrition mode (free-living, parasitic, holozoic, saprotrophic, trophic type), type of habitat (terrestrial, arboreal, aquatic, marine, freshwater, seawater, benthic, pelagic, nektonic, planktonic, etc.), period of activity (diurnal, nocturnal), types of ecological interaction, etc.

The habits of plants and animals often change responding to changes in their environment. For example: if a species develops a disease or there is a drastic change of habitat or local climate, or it is removed to a different region, then the normal habits may change. Such changes may be either pathological, or adaptive.

== Structure ==
In botany, habit is the general appearance, growth form, or architecture. For example:

- Many species of maple have a shrubby habit and may form bushes or hedges rather than trees.
- Certain alpine plants have been chosen for cultivation because of their dwarf habit.

Plants may be woody or herbaceous. The main types of woody plants are trees, shrubs and lianas. Climbing plants (vines) can be woody (lianas) or herbaceous (nonwoody vines). Plants can also be categorized in terms of their habit as subshrubs (dwarf shrub, bush), cushion plants and succulents.

There is some overlap between the classifications of plants according to their habit and their life-form.

Other terms in biology refer similarly to various taxa; for example:

- Fungi are described by their growth patterns: molds, yeasts, mushrooms and dimorphic fungi.
- Lichens structure is described their growth form: foliose, crustose, fruticose or gelatinous.
- Bryophytes structure is described as foliose or thallose.
- The structure of a given species of algae is referred to as its type or level of organization.
- Bacteria are described by their morphology or shape.
- Animal structure is described by its body plan, which encompasses the body symmetry, the type of germ layers and of body cavities.

Since the distinction between the concepts – mode of behavior and morphological form – are significant in zoology, the term habitus (from which the word habit derives) is used to describe form as distinct from behaviour (habit). The term habitus also occurs in botanical texts, but there it is used almost interchangeably with habit, because plant behaviour generally does not correspond closely to the concept of habits in the zoological sense.

== See also ==
- Animal migration
- Crystal habit
- Habit (psychology)
