= Hansschlegelia plantiphila =

Scientific classification
- Domain: Bacteria
- Kingdom: Pseudomonadati
- Phylum: Pseudomonadota
- Class: Alphaproteobacteria
- Order: Hyphomicrobiales
- Family: Methylocystaceae
- Genus: Hansschlegelia
- Species: H. plantiphila

Binomial name
- Hansschlegelia plantiphila Ivanova et al. 2010

Type strain
- NCIMB 14035, VKM B-2347, S1

Synonyms
- Schlegelia plantiphila

Species of bacterium

Hansschlegelia plantiphila is a Gram-negative, aerobic and non-motile bacterium species from the genus Hansschlegelia. Hansschlegelia plantiphila can utilize methanol.
