= Methylopila musalis =

Methylocystis musalis

Scientific classification
- Domain: Bacteria
- Kingdom: Pseudomonadati
- Phylum: Pseudomonadota
- Class: Alphaproteobacteria
- Order: Hyphomicrobiales
- Family: Methylocystaceae
- Genus: Methylopila
- Species: M. musalis

Binomial name
- Methylopila musalis Doronina et al. 2013

Type strain
- CCUG 61696, DSM 24986, MUSA, VKM B-2646

Species of bacterium

Methylopila musalis is a Gram-negative, aerobic, facultatively methanotrophic, rod-shaped non-spore-forming and motile bacterium species from the genus Methylopila which has been isolated from the banana from the tree Musa paradisiaca var. sapientum in Ecuador.
