= Heterotrophic nutrition =

Mode of nutrition

Heterotrophic nutrition is a mode of nutrition in which organisms depend upon other organisms for food to survive. They can't make their own food like Green plants. Heterotrophic organisms have to take in all the organic substances they need to survive.

All animals, certain types of fungi, and non-photosynthesizing plants are heterotrophic. In contrast, green plants, red algae, brown algae, and cyanobacteria are all autotrophs, which use photosynthesis to produce their own food from sunlight. Some fungi may be saprotrophic, meaning they will extracellularly secrete enzymes onto their food to be broken down into smaller, soluble molecules which can diffuse back into the fungus.

== Description ==
All eukaryotes except for green plants and algae are unable to manufacture their own food: They obtain food from other organisms. This mode of nutrition is also known as heterotrophic nutrition.

All heterotrophs (except blood and gut parasites) have to convert solid food into soluble compounds which are capable of being absorbed (digestion). Then the soluble products of digestion for the organism are being broken down for the release of energy (respiration). All heterotrophs depend on autotrophs for their nutrition. Heterotrophic organisms have only four types of nutrition.

Four Main Heterotrophic Nutrition Types
| Term | Description | Example(s) |
|---|---|---|
| Holozoic nutrition (Note: The word Holozic is made from two words: Greek holo - whole and zoikos - of animals. It means animals that eat their food whole.) | Complex food is taken into a specialist digestive system and broken down into small pieces to be absorbed. This consists of 5 stages, ingestion, digestion, absorption, assimilation and defecation. | Humans; carnivores; grazing animals |
| Saprobiontic / saprophytic nutrition | Organisms feed on dead organic remains of other organisms. | Many fungi |
| Parasitic nutrition | Organisms obtain food from other living organisms (the host), with the host receiving no benefit from the parasite. When a parasite is present inside the body of the host, it is known as an endoparasite. These parasites suck and feed on the blood of the host. | Ticks; Tapeworms |
| Symbiotic nutrition | Two organisms live in close association to benefit each other or one of the two benefits the other while it itself suffers neither loss nor does it gain. | Lichens; Rhizobium in the roots of leguminous plants |
