= Franz Daniel Kahn =

Franz Kahn FRS FRAS
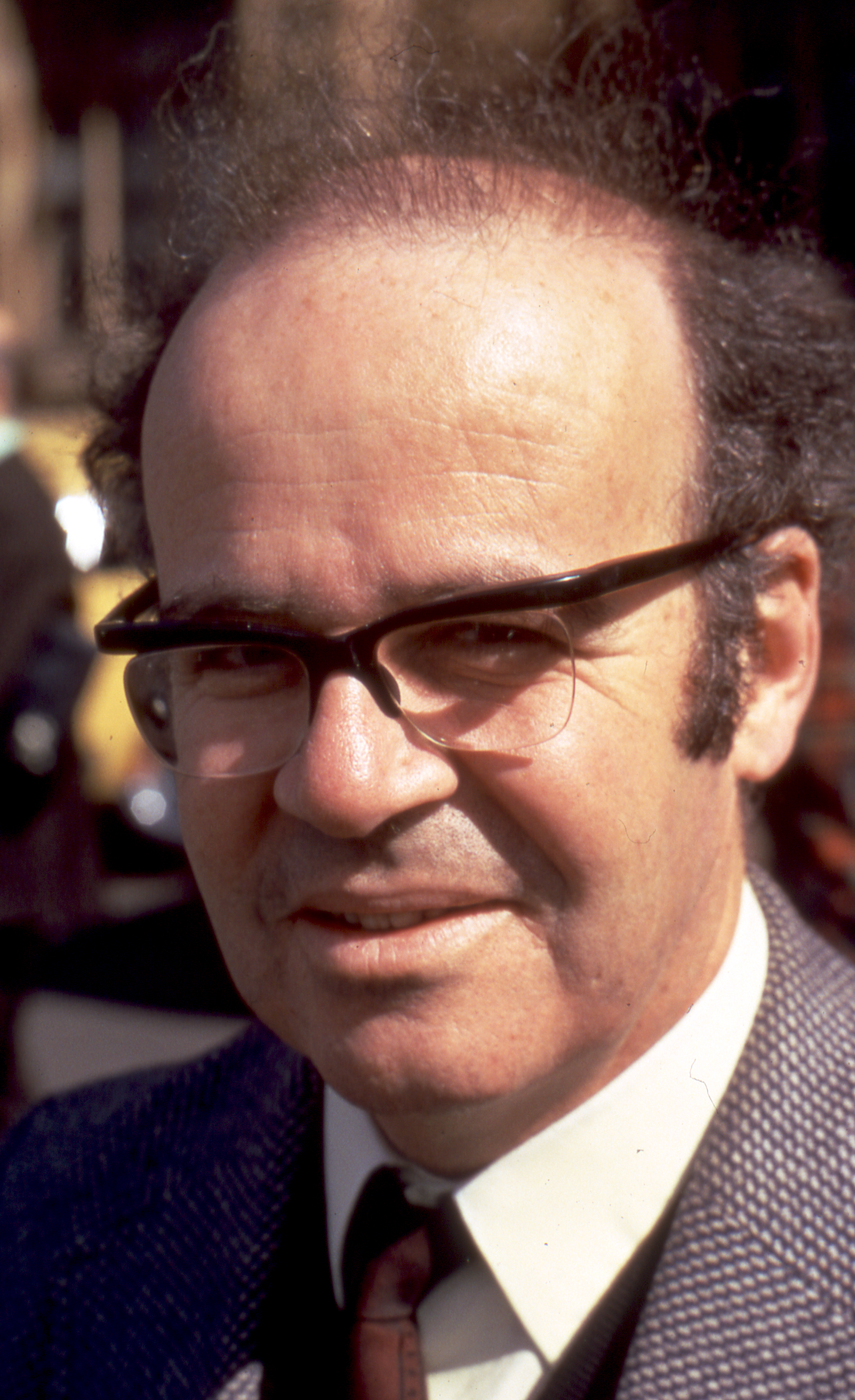
- Kahn in 1973
- Born: Franz Daniel Kahn; 13 May 1926; Nuremberg, Germany
- Died: 8 February 1998 (aged 71)
- Resting place: Manchester, UK
- Education: St Paul's School, London
- Alma mater: University of Oxford (BA, DPhil)
- Spouse: Carla Copeland (m. 1951–1981)
- Scientific career
- Fields: Astrophysics
- Workplaces: University of Manchester
- Thesis: Some problems concerning the luminosity and other properties of the upper atmosphere
- Doctoral advisor: Sydney Chapman
- Doctoral students: Wal Sargent; Tim O'Brien; Leon B. Lucy

Franz Daniel Kahn (1926–1998) was a British mathematician and astrophysicist at the University of Manchester. He was Professor of Astronomy from 1966 to 1993, then Emeritus thereafter in the School of Physics and Astronomy.

== Education ==
Kahn was educated at St Paul's School, London from 1940 to 1944, after which he secured an open scholarship to The Queen's College, Oxford. After graduating with first-class honours in mathematics in 1947 he moved to Balliol College, Oxford in 1948 as a Skynner senior student. He was awarded a Doctor of Philosophy degree in 1950 for research supervised by Sydney Chapman on the luminosity of the upper atmosphere.

== Research and career ==
According to his certificate of election as a Fellow of the Royal Society:

Franz Kahn has made many original contributions to plasma astrophysics, cosmical gas dynamics and the physics of star formation, with significant early papers on the structure of ionisation fronts and collision-free shocks. More recently he has done important work on stellar winds and galactic fountains, on planetary nebulae and on remnants of novae and supernovae. His versatility is shown by papers on the spiral structure of the Galaxy, on the nature of the Local Group and the account (with the late Carla Kahn) of the Einstein-de Sitter correspondence. Kahn's style is especially noteworthy for his skill in building simple mathematical models which bring out the essence of the physics.

=== Awards and honours ===
Kahn was elected a Fellow of the Royal Society (FRS) in 1993. He was also a Fellow of the Royal Astronomical Society (FRAS). In 1991 the International Astronomers Union named the asteroid Kahnia after him.

== Personal life ==
Kahn married Carla Copeland (Carla Kahn) in 1951 and had four children. Kahn died of a heart attack in Bourne End, Buckinghamshire, on 8 February 1998 and was buried in the Jewish cemetery in south Manchester. He was survived by his four children.
