= Methylocystis =

Scientific classification
- Domain: Bacteria
- Kingdom: Pseudomonadati
- Phylum: Pseudomonadota
- Class: Alphaproteobacteria
- Order: Hyphomicrobiales
- Family: Methylocystaceae
- Genus: Methylocystis (ex Whittenbury et al. 1970) Bowman et al. 1993

Type species
- M. parvus

Species
- M. bryophila Belova et al. 2013; M. echinoides (ex Gal'chenko et al. 1977) Bowman et al. 1993; M. heyeri Dedysh et al. 2007; M. hirsuta Lindner et al. 2007; M. parvus (ex Whittenbury et al. 1970) Bowman et al. 1993; M. rosea Wartiainen et al. 2006

Genus of bacteria

Methylocystis is a genus of bacteria from the family Methylocystaceae.
