= Albibacter =

Scientific classification
- Domain: Bacteria
- Kingdom: Pseudomonadati
- Phylum: Pseudomonadota
- Class: Alphaproteobacteria
- Order: Hyphomicrobiales
- Family: Methylocystaceae
- Genus: Albibacter; Doronina et al., 2001

Type species
- A. methylovorans Doronina et al., 2001

Species
- Albibacter helveticus (Doronina et al. 2000) Yang et al. 2016; Albibacter methylovorans Doronina et al. 2001

Genus of bacteria

Albibacter is a genus in the phylum Pseudomonadota (Bacteria).

== Etymology ==
The name Albibacter derives from:
Latin adjective albus, white; Neo-Latin masculine gender noun, bacter, nominally meaning "a rod", but in effect meaning a bacterium, rod; Neo-Latin masculine gender noun Albibacter, white rod.

== See also ==
- Bacterial taxonomy
- Microbiology
