= Methylosinus =

Scientific classification
- Domain: Bacteria
- Kingdom: Pseudomonadati
- Phylum: Pseudomonadota
- Class: Alphaproteobacteria
- Order: Hyphomicrobiales
- Family: Methylocystaceae
- Genus: Methylosinus; Bowman et al. 1993

Type species
- M. sporium

Species
- M. sporium M. trichosporium

Genus of bacteria

Methylosinus is a genus of bacteria from the family of Methylocystaceae.
