= List of fellows of the Royal Society elected in 1993 =

This is a list of fellows of the Royal Society elected in 1993.

== Fellows ==
1. Alan Astbury
2. Alan David Baddeley
3. Frederick Michael Burdekin
4. Timothy Hugh Clutton-Brock
5. David George Crighton (1942–2000)
6. Richard Anthony Crowther
7. Sir Howard Dalton (1944–2008)
8. Geoffrey Dearnaley (d. 2009)
9. Martin Evans
10. Ian Fleming
11. Ludwig Edward Fraenkel
12. Sir Richard Henry Friend
13. Christopher John Raymond Garrett
14. Keith Glover
15. Michael George Hall
16. David Rodney Roger Heath-Brown
17. John Hughes
18. Robin Francis Irvine
19. Patricia Ann Jacobs
20. Michael Joseph Kelly
21. Kevin Kendall
22. Franz Daniel Kahn (1926–1998)
23. Trevor Lamb
24. Sydney Leach
25. Angus John Macintyre
26. Michael Neuberger
27. Ian Newton
28. Colin Patterson (1933–1998)
29. Colin Trevor Pillinger
30. Ghillean Prance
31. Edward Osmund Royle Reynolds
32. John David Rhodes
33. James Cuthbert Smith
34. Brian Geoffrey Spratt
35. David John Stevenson
36. Bruce William Stillman
37. Andrew James Thomson
38. Peter John Twin
39. Anthony Edward Walsby
40. John William White

== Foreign members ==
1. Bruce Alberts
2. Lennart Axel Edvard Carleson
3. Richard R. Ernst
4. Jean-Marie Lehn
5. Motoo Kimura (1924–1994)
6. Edwin Ernest Salpeter (d. 2008)
