= Hansschlegelia =

Scientific classification
- Domain: Bacteria
- Kingdom: Pseudomonadati
- Phylum: Pseudomonadota
- Class: Alphaproteobacteria
- Order: Hyphomicrobiales
- Family: Methylocystaceae
- Genus: Hansschlegelia; Ivanova et al. 2010

Type species
- Hansschlegelia plantiphila

Species
- H. beijingensis; H. plantiphila; H. quercus; H. zhihuaiae

Genus of bacteria

Hansschlegelia is a genus of bacteria from the family Methylocystaceae.
