= Slash (logging) =

Residues created by forest harvesting

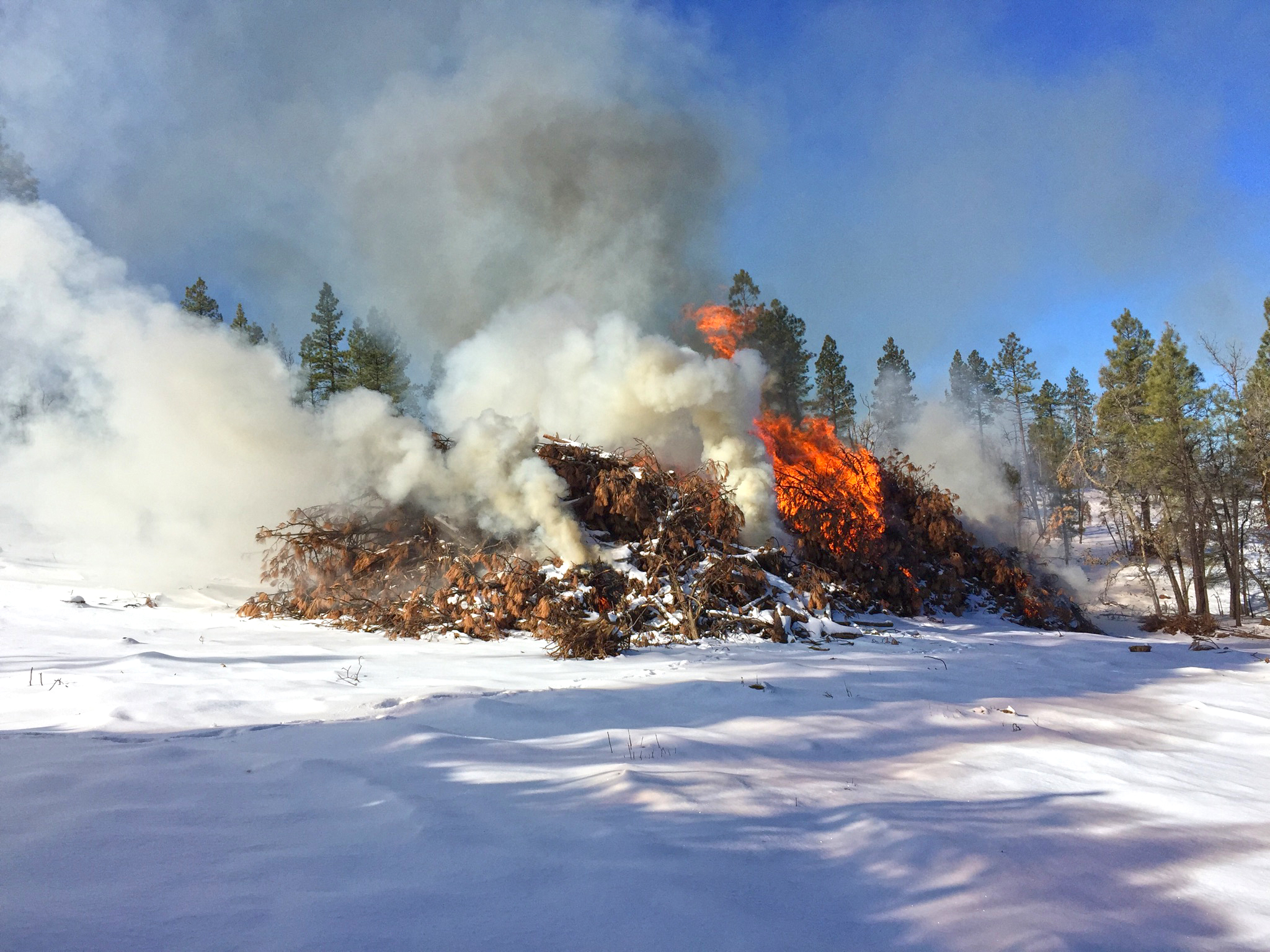
Slash being burned in Coconino National Forest

In forestry, slash, or slashings are coarse and fine woody debris generated during logging operations or through wind, snow or other natural forest disturbances. Slash generated during logging operations may increase fire hazard, and some North American states have passed laws requiring the treatment of logging slash. Logging slash can be chipped and used (for example) in the production of electricity or heat in cogeneration power-plants, or simply burned onsite.

Where logging takes place on soft ground, loggers can use the branches and tops of trees as part of the timber-harvesting process to provide a track for forest machines. Using slash in this manner reduces ground damage.

== See also ==
- Coarse woody debris
- Lignocellulosic biomass
