= A.E. Walsby =

English biologist

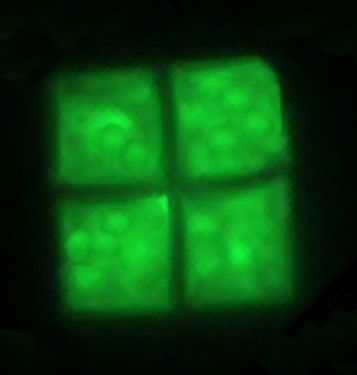
Haloquadratum walsbyi

Anthony Edward Walsby, FRS (1941 – April 14, 2024) was a Professor of Microbiology at the School of Biological Sciences, University of Bristol.

He was a researcher in the fields of Algae, Cyanobacteria, lake ecology, gas vesicles and genetics, covering the European lakes and Baltic Sea. He is noted for his discovery of Haloquadratum walsbyi in brine ponds on the Sinai Peninsula in 1980. He was elected Fellow of the Royal Society on 11 March 1993.

Specifically his research included:

- Gas vesicles of cyanobacteria: physiology; structure; molecular biology; ecology
- The natural selection of gas vesicles in relation to depth of lakes and oceans
- Population genetics of cyanobacteria using PCR on single filaments from lakes
- The cyanobacterium Planktothrix rubescens in stratified lakes
- Calculating the daily integrals of growth and photosynthesis in lakes

== Selected publications ==
- Fay, P., & Walsby, A. E. 1966. Metabolic activities of isolated heterocysts of the blue-green alga Anabaena cylindrica. Nature, 209(5018), 94-95.
- Walsby, A. E., & Eichelberger, H. H. 1968. The fine structure of gas-vacuoles released from cells of the blue-green alga Anabaena flos-aquae. Archiv für Mikrobiologie, 60, 76-83.
- Walsby, A. E. 1969. The permeability of blue-green algal gas-vacuole membranes to gas. Proceedings of the Royal Society of London. Series B. Biological Sciences, 173(1031), 235-255.
- Walsby, A. E. 1972. Structure and function of gas vacuoles. Bacteriological reviews, 36(1), 1-32.
- Walsby, A. E. 1974. The isolation of gas vesicles from blue-green algae. In Methods in enzymology (Vol. 31, pp. 678-686). Academic Press.
- Blaurock, A. E., & Walsby, A. E. 1976. Crystalline structure of the gas vesicle wall from Anabaena flos-aquae. Journal of molecular biology, 105(2), 183-199.
- Hayes, P. K., & Walsby, A. E. 1986. The inverse correlation between width and strength of gas vesicles in cyanobacteria. British phycological journal, 21(2), 191-197.
- Walsby, A. E., & Hayes, P. K. 1988. The minor cyanobacterial gas vesicle protein, GVPc, is attached to the outer surface of the gas vesicle. Microbiology, 134(10), 2647-2657.
- Walsby, A. E., & Hayes, P. K. 1989. Gas vesicle proteins. Biochemical Journal, 264(2), 313.
- Walsby, A.E. 1991. The mechanical properties of the Microcystis gas vesicle. Journal of General Microbiology 137, 2401–2408.
- Walsby, A.E., Revsbech, N.P. & Griffel, D.H. 1992. The gas permeability coefficient of the cyanobacterial gas vesicle wall. Journal of General Microbiology 138, 837–845.
- Buchholz, B.E.E., Hayes, P.K. & Walsby, A.E. 1993. The distribution of the outer gas vesicle protein, GvpC, on the Anabaena gas vesicle, and its ratio to GvpA. Journal of General Microbiology, 139, 2353–2363.
- Walsby, A.E. 1994. Gas vesicles. Microbiological Reviews, 58, 94-144.
- Kinsman, R., Walsby, A.E. & Hayes, P.K. 1995. GvpCs with reduced numbers of repeating sequence elements bind to and strengthen cyanobacterial gas vesicles. Molecular Microbiology, 17, 147–154.
- McMaster, T.J., Miles, M.J. & Walsby, A.E. 1996. Direct observation of protein secondary structure in gas vesicles by atomic force microscopy. Biophysics Journal, 70, 2432–2436.
- Walsby, A.E., Hayes, P.K., Boje, R. & Stal, L.J. 1997. The selective advantage of buoyancy provided by gas vesicles for planktonic cyanobacteria in the Baltic Sea. New Phytologist, 136, 407–417.
- Walsby, A.E., Avery, A. & Schanz, F. 1998. The critical pressures of gas vesicles in Planktothrix rubescens in relation to the depth of winter mixing in Lake Zurich, Switzerland. Journal of Plankton Research 20: 1357–1375.
- Walsby, AE. (2005) Archaea with square cells. Trends in Microbiology, 13, 193 - 195.
- Dunton, PG & Walsby, AE. (2005) The diameter and critical collapse pressure of gas vesicles in Microcystis are correlated with GvpCs of different length. FEMS Letters, 247, 37 - 43.
- Walsby, AE. (2005) Stratification by cyanobacteria in lakes: a dynamic buoyancy model indicates size limitations met by Planktothrix rubescens filaments. New Phytologist, Blackwell, 168 (2), 365 - 376.
- Walsby, AE & Holland, DP. (2006) Sinking velocities of phytoplankton measured on a stable density gradient by laser scanning. Journal of the Royal Society Interface, The Royal Society, 3 (8), 429 - 439.
- Dunton, PG, Mawby, WJ, Shaw, VA & Walsby, AE. (2006) Analysis of tryptic digests indicates regions of GvpC that bind to gas vesicles of Anabaena flos-aquae. Microbiology, Society for General Microbiology, 152 (6), 1661 - 1669.
- Walsby, AE & Dunton, PG. (2006) Gas vesicles in actinomycetes? Trends in Microbiology, Elsevier, 14 (3), 99 - 100.
- Walsby, AE. (2006) Gordon Elliott Fogg CBE, 26 April 1919 - 30 January 2005. Biographical Memoirs of Fellows of the Royal Society, Royal Society, 52, 97 - 116.
- Walsby, AE, Schanz, F & Schmidt, M. (2006) The Burgundy-blood phenomenon: a model of buoyancy change explains autumnal waterblooms of Planktothrix rubescens in Lake Zurich. New Phytologist, Blackwell, 169 (1), 109 - 122.
- Walsby, AE & Juttner, F. (2006) The uptake of amino acids by the cyanobacterium Planktothrix rubescens is stimulated by light at low irradiances. FEMS Microbiology Ecology, Blackwell, 58 (1), 14 - 22.
