= GvpA =

gvpA gas vesicle synthesis protein GvpA

Identifiers
- Organism: Halobacterium salinarum NRC-1
- Symbol: gvpA
- Entrez: 1446785
- Orthologs: NCBI: entry; OMA: entry
- RefSeq (Prot): NP_045970.1
- UniProt: P08958

Other data
- Chromosome: Genome: 0.02 - 0.02 Mb
Search for
- Structures: Swiss-model
- Domains: InterPro

GvpA

Identifiers
- Symbol: GvpA
- Pfam: PF00741
- InterPro: IPR000638
- PROSITE: PDOC00207
Available protein structures:
- PDB: IPR000638 PF00741 (ECOD; PDBsum)
- AlphaFold: IPR000638; PF00741

GvpA is a gas vesicle structural protein found in different phyla of bacteria and archaea for example in Halobacterium salinarum or Haloferax mediterranei. Gas vesicles are small, hollow, gas filled protein structures found in several cyanobacterial and archaebacterial microorganisms. They allow the positioning of the bacteria at a favourable depth for growth.

GvpA associates with GvpC, to build up gas vesicles, hollow protein structures which are used by planktonic organisms to perform vertical migration. GvpA makes up most of the structure, as so called "ribs", rigid β-sheets, whereas GvpC stabilizes the vesicle against collapse by crosslinking as α-helices.

== Sequence ==
The sequence of GVPa is extremely well conserved. GvpJ and gvpM, two proteins encoded in the cluster of genes required for gas vesicle synthesis in the archaebacteria Halobacterium salinarium and Halobacterium mediterranei (Haloferax mediterranei), have been found to be evolutionarily related to GVPa. The exact function of these two proteins is not known, although they could be important for determining the shape determination gas vesicles. The N-terminal domain of Aphanizomenon flos-aquae protein gvpA/J is also related to GVPa.

== Structure ==
GvpA of Halobacterium salinarum is a 76 amino acid long 8 kDa hydrophobic monomer.

Gas vesicles are hollow cylindrical tubes, closed by a hollow, conical cap at each end. Both the conical end caps and central cylinder are made up of 4-5 nm wide ribs that run at right angles to the long axis of the structure. Gas vesicles seem to be constituted of two different protein components, GVPa and GVPc. GVPa, a small protein of about 70 amino acid residues, is the main constituent of gas vesicles and form the essential core of the structure.
