= Methylosinus trichosporium =

Scientific classification
- Domain: Bacteria
- Kingdom: Pseudomonadati
- Phylum: Pseudomonadota
- Class: Alphaproteobacteria
- Order: Hyphomicrobiales
- Family: Methylocystaceae
- Genus: Methylosinus
- Species: M. trichosporium

Binomial name
- Methylosinus trichosporium Bowman et al. 1993

Type strain
- ACM 3311, ATCC 35070, IMET 10541, NCIMB 11131, OB3b, UNIQEM 75, VKM B-2117

Species of bacterium

Methylosinus trichosporium is an obligate aerobic and methane-oxidizing bacterium species from the genus of Methylosinus. Its native habitat is generally in the soil, but the bacteria has been isolated from fresh water sediments and groundwater as well. Because of this bacterium's ability to oxidize methane, M. trichosporium has been popular for identifying both the structure and function of enzymes involved with methane oxidation since it was first isolated in 1970 by Roger Whittenbury and colleagues. Since its discovery, M. trichosporium and its soluble monooxygenase enzyme have been studied in detail to see if the bacterium could help in bioremediation treatments.

== Biology ==
As a type II methanotroph, M. trichosporium relies on methane as its primary source of carbon and energy. A commonly used strain of this bacteria is strain OB3b, which is available through the American Type Culture Collection. Even though all methanotrophs can form particulate methane monooxygenase (pMMO), the ability to produce soluble methane monooxygenase (sMMO) is limited to type II methanotrophs. These enzymes perform the same purpose for cellular function, but sMMO has a much higher specificity compared to pMMO. Another key difference between the sMMO and pMMO is that they are produced under different conditions. In environments with concentrations of copper lower than 0.25 μM, sMMO is produced, but in higher concentrations of copper, sMMO production is lost and pMMO is produced.

== Applications in bioremediation ==
The ability to produce sMMO is of particular interest to researchers due to its ability to degrade trichloroethene (TCE) at a magnitude one order higher than other microbial cultures. For example, in one study on removal of TCE from sources at as high of concentration as 50 mg/mL, M. trichosporium was shown to be able to remove up to 99% of TCE. Despite the efficiency of sMMO, the products formed from degrading TCE are toxic to M. trichosporium. This bacterium already grows relatively slowly, so toxic effects of TCE degradation products have made it challenging to use M. trichosporium in bioremediation treatments. The effect of copper on strain OB3b's ability to produce sMMO is also a limiting effect of what environments M. trichosporium can be used in.
