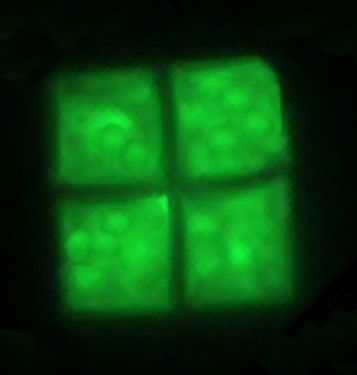
- Haloquadratum walsbyi (drawing, 2008)
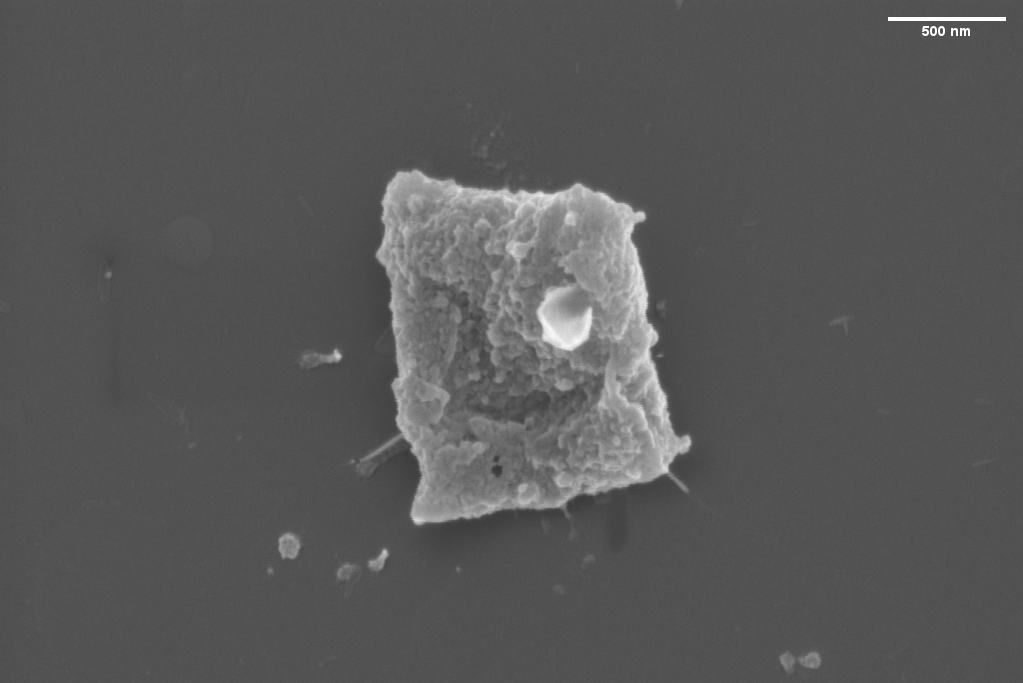
- Haloquadratum walsbyi (SEM image, 2023)

Scientific classification
- Domain: Archaea
- Kingdom: Methanobacteriati
- Phylum: Methanobacteriota
- Class: Halobacteria
- Order: Haloferacales
- Family: Haloferacaceae
- Genus: Haloquadratum
- Species: H. walsbyi

Binomial name
- Haloquadratum walsbyi Burns et al. 2007

= Haloquadratum walsbyi =

Species of halotolerant archaea

Haloquadratum walsbyi is a species of Archaea in the genus Haloquadratum, known for its square shape and halophilic nature.

First discovered in a brine pool in the Sinai Peninsula of Egypt, H. walsbyi is noted for its flat, square-shaped cells, and its unusual ability to survive in aqueous environments with high concentrations of sodium chloride and magnesium chloride. The species' genus name Haloquadratum translates from Greek and Latin as "salt square". This archaean is also commonly referred to as Walsby's Square Bacterium because of its unique square shape. In accordance with its name, H. walsbyi are most abundantly observed in salty environments.

Haloquadratum walsbyi is a phototrophic halophilic archaeon. It was the only recognized species of the genus Haloquadratum until 1999 when Haloarcula quadrata was reported as recovered from a brine pool. Haloquadratum walsbyi has a unique cellular structure that resembles an almost-perfectly flat-shaped figure.

The genus was first observed in 1980 by British microbiologist Anthony E. Walsby from samples taken from the Sabkha Gavish, a brine lake in southern Sinai, Egypt. The discovery was formally described in 2007 by Burns et al. Attempts to cultivate the archaea were unsuccessful until 2004 and resulted in the identification of Haloarcula quadrata, a separate species of square archaea that is distinct from H. walsbyi.

== Description ==
Haloquadratum walsbyi cells size at 2 to 5 microns and 100 to 200 nanometers thick. The archaea generally contain granules of polyhydroxyalkanoates and hold a number of refractive vacuoles filled with gas that ensure buoyancy in an aqueous environment, and allow for maximum light absorption. These gas vacuoles were discovered by Walsby in 1980 when determining the identity of intracellular refractive bodies in the archaean's structure. They gather in sheets up to 40 μm wide, but the connections between the cells are fragile and can easily be broken.

These organisms can be found in any stretch of salty water. During the evaporation of seawater, calcium carbonate (CaCO_{3}) and calcium sulfate (CaSO_{4}) precipitate first, leading to a brine rich in sodium chloride NaCl. If evaporation continues, NaCl precipitates in the form of halite, leaving a brine rich in magnesium chloride (MgCl_{2}). H. walsbyi prospers during the final phase of the precipitation of halite, and can constitute 80% of the biomass of this medium. H. walsbyi cells have been determined to be Gram-negative through staining and when grown in a laboratory the best determined conditions for growth is a media with 18% salts at a neutral pH.

The genome of H. walsbyi has been completely sequenced, allowing access to a better understanding of the phylogenetic and taxonomic classification of this organism and its role in the ecosystem. A genomic comparison of Spanish and Australian isolates (strains HBSQ001 and C23^{T}) strongly suggests a rapid global dispersion, as they are remarkably similar and have maintained the order of genes.

Its growth in the laboratory was obtained in a medium with very high chloride concentrations (greater than 2 mol · L^{−1} of MgCl_{2} and greater than 3 mol · L ^{−1}of NaCl ), making this organism among the most haloresistant known. Its optimum growth temperature is 40 °C (104 °F), making this archaea a mesophile.

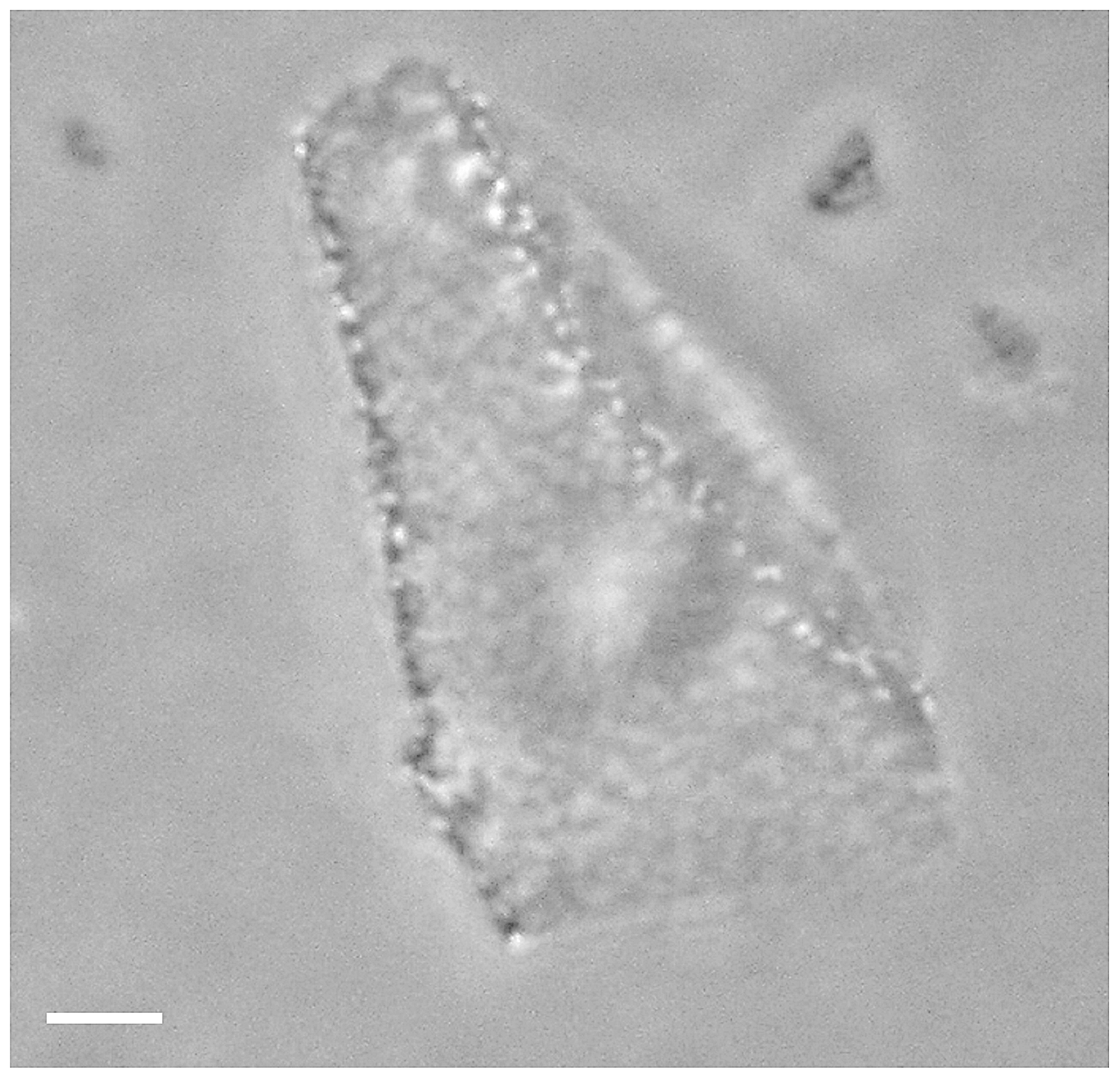
Optical phase-contrast microscopy image of a Haloquadratum walsbyi square cell. The numerous light dots are gas vesicles that allow flotation to the surface, most likely to acquire oxygen.
Scale bar 1 μm

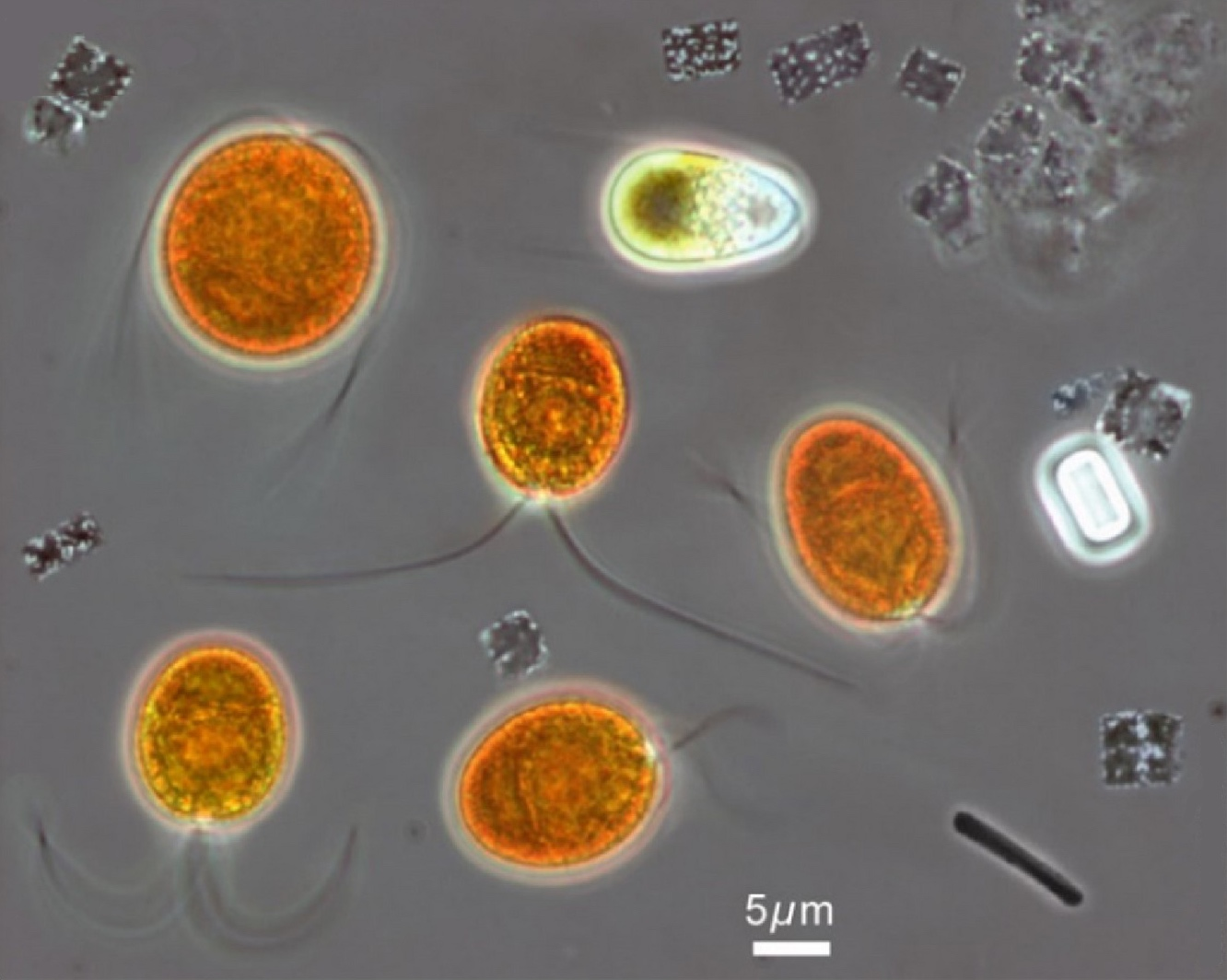
Microscopic image from the hypersaline Lake Tyrrell, in which orange chlorophyte Dunaliella salina can be tentatively identified, accompanied by a number of smaller Haloquadratum walsbyi, showing their flat square-shaped cells.

== Diversity ==
A surprisingly high amount of cells in salt brines around the world are Haloquadratum walsbyi, up to 80%. Experiments have been done to examine the genetic diversity in the salt brine environment. Seven different types of H. walsbyi's genomic island have been discovered in natural environments. After examining the metagenomic fosmid library for H. walsbyi, two types of the cell-wall associated islands were identified. The genes in these islands include those responsible for the synthesis of surface layer structures such as glycoproteins and genes responsible for the synthesis of cell envelopes. Homologous recombination is responsible for the maintaining the genes mentioned above and also the diversity of the metagenome in its natural environment. Surface structures on different H. walsbyi cells help to differentiate sources of lineage for the population as a whole. These differing structures also increase the diversity of the cells in their natural environment. These changes in cell structure may be due to the cells' attempts to reduce their susceptibility to attack by viruses. In 2009 an experiment was conducted in Australia to determine the diversity of H. walsbyi in three distinct saltern crystallizer ponds. In all three of the pools that were located in different regions they all shared two 97%-OTU of both Haloquadratum and Halorubrum -like sequences.

== Genomics and structure ==
H. walsbyi is classified as an oligotrophic microorganism, as it grows in nutrient deficient conditions where concentrations of organic substances are minimal. The high surface to volume ratio of H. walsbyi, due to its flattened shape, helps maximize nutrient uptake and overcome this limitation. Because of their square shape, they are more capable of flattening than spherical shaped microorganisms are. H. walsbyi can flatten an extreme amount of about 0.1-0.5μm. The overall size of the cell structure ranges from 1.5 to 11 μm. However, larger cells have been observed. The largest recorded H. walsbyi cell was measured as 40 x 40 μm.

The square shape of H. walsbyi has been the focus of many studies. It is able to maintain this structure due to its adaptive traits. These traits can be found in both H. walsbyi's genome composition as well as its protein sequences. For example, H.walsbyi's expression of the halomucin protein creates an aqueous protective layering that helps prevent desiccation of the cells. These adaptations allow H. walsbyi to thrive in environments such as saturated brines while also maintaining a defined square structure.

H. walsbyi's cellular structure consists of highly refractive gas vesicles, poly-β-hydroxyalkanoate granules, and a unique cellular wall. This microbe has displayed cell walls that range from 15 to 25 nm in thickness. The genome of H.walsbyi encodes S-layered glycoproteins of the cell wall. Additionally, photoactive retinal proteins are also encoded for the membrane. The HBSQ001 strain, discovered in 2004, showed these same internal cellular structures. However, this specific strain showed a complex trichotomous structured cell wall.

The strain HBSQ001, DSM 16790 of H. walsbyi has a 3,132,494 bp chromosome. H. walsbyi is distinguished by the abnormally low Guanine-Cytosine (GC) content compared to other haloarchaea. H. walsbyi has an average of 47.9% GC content compared to the expected 60-70%. Additionally, the proteins encoded are highly conserved specifically in the amino acid sequence. It is understood that H. walsbyi evolved from a typical GC rich, moderately conserving ancestor.

== History ==
The Haloquadratum walsbyi archaea was first discovered in 1980 by a microbiology professor Anthony E. Walsby. The microbe was initially named after him as "Walsby's square bacterium," as it was discovered before the archaea domain was acknowledged in full. It is now formally known as Haloquadratum walsbyi, and considered a well known halophilic archaea. Additionally, it is accredited to be one of first archaea discovered with a square cellular shape.

Upon the observation of the unique shape of H. walsbyi, cultivation has been a goal for scientists studying the species. Hyper-saline media has been found to be a substantial medium to maintain the pure cultures. H. walsbyi remains one of the largest prokaryotes known today and contains roughly 3 million basepairs.

As mentioned earlier, the location site of this distinctive microbe's discovery was in the transcontinental country of Egypt within the Sinai peninsula. However, with this discovery also came an extended period that consisted of intensive trial and error attempts to achieve complete isolation of H. walsbyi. Because of how difficult it was to fully isolate this microorganism, there existed a vast gap in known information on H. walsbyi's physiological processes and genomic composition. However in 2004, two strains of H. walsbyi were successfully isolated and able to be sequenced. The second strain was an Australian isolate, called C23. Five strains were additionally isolated, totaling in seven total isolates of H. walsbyi. In a specific hypersaline environment, Lake Tyrrell, Haloquadratum walsbyi made up nearly 38% of the community of archaea found when the ecosystem was cultured.

== Normal microbiota ==
The Archaeon Haloquadratum walsbyi is abundant in red brines, in salt lakes and solar salter crystallizer ponds, shallow ponds that are connected to each other and increase in salinity. Bacteriorhodopsin, a membrane protein that uses energy from light to drive the hydrogen-ion pump, which are found in Haloquadratum walsbyi, absorbs energy from light and are found in communities within these brines. The use of these bacteriorhodopsin shows the photoheterotroph nature of H. walsbyi. The salt saturated environments that this archaean inhabits, along with being rich in magnesium chloride, have low activity within the water which causes desiccation stress. These salt saturated environments can have a salinity of more than ten-times that of average seawater. The magnesium saturation in these ecosystems, what is also referred to as bitterns, are most often found with very little to no life present. H. walsbyi is able to survive in these hostile environments due to its unique genomic makeup; other organisms would perish in similar conditions.
