= Methylopila =

Methylocystis

Scientific classification
- Domain: Bacteria
- Kingdom: Pseudomonadati
- Phylum: Pseudomonadota
- Class: Alphaproteobacteria
- Order: Hyphomicrobiales
- Family: Methylocystaceae
- Genus: Methylopila; Doronina et al. 1998

Type species
- M. capsulata

Species
- M. capsulata Doronina et al. 1998; M. carotae Kaparullina et al. 2020; M. henanensis corrig. Wang et al. 2015; M. jiangsuensis Li et al. 2011; M. musalis Doronina et al. 2013; M. oligotropha Poroshina et al. 2014; M. turkensis corrig. Shmareva et al. 2017

Genus of bacteria

Methylopila is a genus of bacteria from the family Methylocystaceae.
