= Gas vesicle =

Halobacterial Gas Vesicles. (A) Halobacterium salinarum colonies on a solid medium. Pink, opaque colonies from gas vesicle-containing cells; a red, transparent colony from gas vesicle-deficient cells. (B) Cryo-transmission electron micrograph of cells in 3 M NaCl plus 81 mM MgSO_{4}. The image has the low signal-to-noise ratio due to the high concentration of NaCl. (C) Cryo-transmission electron micrograph of a focused ion beam-thinned cell in 3 M NaCl plus 81 mM MgSO_{4}. The periodicity of the gas vesicle is clearly discerned. (A) Adapted from Pfeifer (2015), (B, C) from Bollschweiler et al. (2017), with permission from the publisher.

Gas vesicles, also known as gas vacuoles, are nanocompartments in certain prokaryotic organisms, which help in buoyancy. Gas vesicles are composed entirely of protein; no lipids or carbohydrates have been detected.

== Function ==
Gas vesicles occur primarily in aquatic organisms as they are used to modulate the cell's buoyancy and modify the cell's position within a water column so it can be optimally positioned for photosynthesis or to move locations that have more or less oxygen. Organisms that could float to the air–liquid interface out competes other aerobes that cannot rise in a water column, through using up oxygen in the top layer.

In addition, gas vesicles can be used to maintain optimum salinity by positioning the organism in specific locations in a stratified body of water to prevent osmotic shock. High concentrations of solute will cause water to be drawn out of the cell by osmosis, causing cell lysis. The ability to synthesize gas vesicles is one of many strategies that allow halophilic organisms to tolerate environments with high salt content.

== Evolution ==
Gas vesicles are likely one of the most early mechanisms of motility among microscopic organisms due to the fact that it is the most conserved mechanism of motility within the genome of prokaryotes, some of which have evolved ~ 3 billion years ago. Functions of the gas vesicles are also largely conserved among species, although the mode of regulation might differ, suggesting the importance of gas vesicles as a form of motility. In certain organism such as enterobacterium Serratia sp. flagella-based motility and gas vesicle production are regulated oppositely by a single RNA binding protein, RsmA, suggesting alternate modes of environmental adaptation which would have developed into different taxons through regulation of the development between motility and flotation.

Although there is evidence suggesting the early evolution of gas vesicles horizontal gene transfer (HGT) serves as an alternate explanation of the widespread and conserved nature of the organelle. Cleavage of a plasmid in Halobacterium halobium resulted in the loss of the ability to biosynthesize gas vesicles. This indicates the possibility of the transfer of genes required to synthesize gas vesicles among different populations of bacteria.

== Structure ==
Gas vesicles imaged with transmission electron microscopy. (A) Wild-type cells. (B) Pressurized wild-type cells. (C) Mutant cells deleted for the gas vesicle gene clusters. (D) Gas vesicles with different widths. (A~D) Adapted from Ramsay et al. (2011), with permission from the publisher.

Gas vesicles are generally lemon-shaped or cylindrical, hollow tubes of protein with conical caps on both ends. The vesicles vary most in their diameter. Larger vesicles can hold more air and use less protein making them the most economic in terms of resource use, however, large vesicles are weaker under pressure. Organisms have evolved to be the most efficient with protein use and use the largest maximum vesicle diameter that will withstand the pressure the organism could be exposed to. In order for natural selection to have affected gas vesicles, the vesicles' diameter must be controlled by genetics. Although genes encoding gas vesicles are found in many species of haloarchaea, only a few species produce them. The first Haloarchaeal gas vesicle gene, GvpA was cloned from Halobacterium sp. NRC-1. 14 genes are involved in forming gas vesicles in haloarchaea.

The first gas vesicle gene was identified in Calothrix. There are at least two proteins that compose a cyanobacterium's gas vesicle: GvpA, and GvpC. GvpA forms ribs and much of the mass (up to 90%) of the main structure. GvpA is strongly hydrophobic while GvpC is hydrophilic and helps to stabilize the structure by periodic inclusions into the GvpA ribs. GvpC is capable of being washed out of the vesicle and a consequential decreases in the vesicle's strength. The thickness of the vesicle's wall may range from 1.8 to 2.8 nm. The ribbed structure of the vesicle is evident on both inner and outer surfaces with a spacing of 4–5 nm between ribs. Vesicles may be 100–1400 nm long and 45–120 nm in diameter.

Within a species gas vesicle sizes are relatively uniform with a standard deviation of ±4%.

== Growth ==
Gas vesicle formation and morphology. (A) and (B) Transmission electron micrographs of gas vesicles in Halobacterium salinarum. Spindle-shaped gas vesicles in (A). Isolated cylinder-shaped gas vesicles in (B). (C) Morphogenesis of gas vesicles from a bicone to a spindle- or cylinder-shaped gas vesicle. (D) Groups of gas vesicles. They form clusters during the early stage of gas vesicle formation, and fill the cells later. (E) Detailed diagram of a gas vesicle. A gas nanocompartment enclosed with a gas-permeable shell. (A~D) Adapted from Pfeifer (2012) and (E) from Shapiro et al. (2014), with permission from the publisher.

It appears that gas vesicles begin their existence as small biconical (two cones with the flat bases joined) structures which enlarge to the specific diameter than grow and expand their length. It is unknown exactly what controls the diameter but it may be a molecule that interferes with GvpA or the shape of GvpA may change.

== Regulation ==
Formation of gas vesicles are regulated by two Gvp proteins: GvpD, which represses the expression of GvpA and GvpC proteins, and GvpE, which induces expression. Extracellular environmental factors also affect vesicle formation, either by regulating Gvp protein production or by directly disturbing the vesicle structure.

=== Light intensity ===
Light intensity has been found to affect gas vesicles production and maintenance differently between different bacteria and archaea. For Anabaena flos-aquae, higher light intensities leads to vesicle collapse from an increase in turgor pressure and greater accumulation of photosynthetic products. In cyanobacteria, vesicle production decreases at high light intensity due to exposure of the bacterial surface to UV radiation, which can damage the bacterial genome.

=== Carbohydrates ===
Accumulation of glucose, maltose, or sucrose in Haloferax mediterranei and Haloferax volcanii were found to inhibit the expression of GvpA proteins and, therefore, a decrease of gas vesicle production. However, this only occurred at the cell's early exponential growth phase. Vesicle formation could also be induced in decreasing extracellular glucose concentrations.

=== Oxygen ===
A lack of oxygen was found to negatively affect gas vesicle formation in halophilic archaea. Halobacterium salinarum produce little or no vesicles under anaerobic conditions due to reduced synthesis of mRNA transcripts encoding for Gvp proteins. H. mediterranei and H. volcanii do not produce any vesicles under anoxic conditions due to a decrease in synthesized transcripts encoding for GvpA and truncated transcripts expressing GvpD.

=== pH ===
Increased extracellular pH levels have been found to increase vesicle formation in Microcytis species. Under increased pH, levels of gvpA and gvpC transcripts increase, allowing more exposure to ribosomes for expression and leading to upregulation of Gvp proteins. It may be attributed to greater transcription of these genes, decreased decay of the synthesized transcripts or the higher stability of the mRNA.

=== Ultrasonic irradiation ===
Ultrasonic irradiation, at certain frequencies, was found to collapse gas vesicles in cyanobacteria Spirulina platensis, preventing them from blooming.

=== Quorum sensing ===
In enterobacterium; Serratia sp. strain ATCC39006, gas vesicle is produced only when there is sufficient concentration of a signalling molecule, N-acyl homoserine lactone. In this case, the quorum sensing molecule, N-acyl homoserine lactone acts as a morphogen initiating organelle development. This is advantageous to the organism as resources for gas vesicle production are utilized only when there is oxygen limitation caused by an increase in bacterial population.

== Role in vaccine development ==
Gas vesicle gene gvpC from Halobacterium sp. is used as delivery system for vaccine studies.

Several characteristics of the protein encoded by the gas vesicle gene gvpC allow it to be used as carrier and adjuvant for antigens: it is stable, resistant to biological degradation, tolerates relatively high temperatures (up to 50 °C), and non-pathogenic to humans. Several antigens from various human pathogens have been recombined into the gvpC gene to create subunit vaccines with long-lasting immunologic responses.

Different genomic segments encoding for several Chlamydia trachomatis pathogen's proteins, including MOMP, OmcB, and PompD, are joined to the gvpC gene of Halobacteria. In vitro assessments of cells show expression of the Chlamydia genes on cell surfaces through imaging techniques and show characteristic immunologic responses such as TLRs activities and pro-inflammatory cytokines production. Gas vesicle gene can be exploited as a delivery vehicle to generate a potential vaccine for Chlamydia. Limitations of this method include the need to minimize the damage of the GvpC protein itself while including as much of the vaccine target gene into the gvpC gene segment.

A similar experiment uses the same gas vesicle gene and Salmonella enterica pathogen's secreted inosine phosphate effector protein SopB4 and SopB5 to generate a potential vaccine vector. Immunized mice secrete pro-inflammatory cytokines IFN-γ, IL-2, and IL-9. Antibody IgG is also detected. After an infection challenge, none or significantly less amount of bacteria were found in the harvested organs such as the spleen and the liver. Potential vaccines using gas vesicle as an antigen display can be given via the mucosal route as an alternative administration pathway, increasing its accessibility to more people and eliciting a wider range of immune responses within the body.

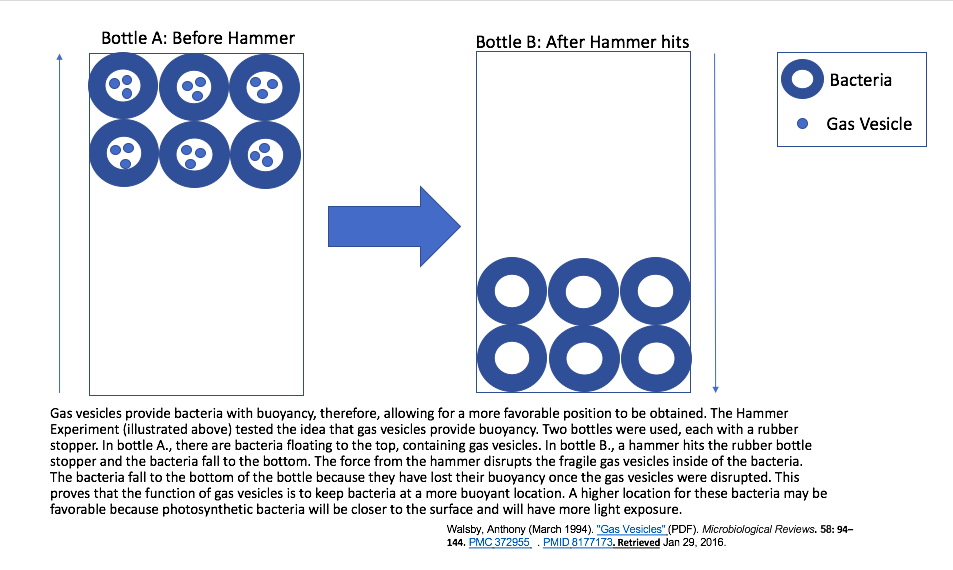
The Hammer Experiment

== Role as contrast agents and reporter genes ==
Gas vesicles have several physical properties that make them visible on various medical imaging modalities. The ability of gas vesicle to scatter light has been used for decades for estimating their concentration and measuring their collapse pressure . The optical contrast of gas vesicles also enables them to serve as contrast agents in optical coherence tomography, with applications in ophthalmology. The difference in acoustic impedance between the gas in their cores and the surrounding fluid gives gas vesicles robust acoustic contrast. Moreover, the ability of some gas vesicle shells to buckle generates harmonic ultrasound echoes that improves the contrast to tissue ratio. Finally, gas vesicles can be used as contrast agents for magnetic resonance imaging (MRI), relying on the difference between the magnetic susceptibility of air and water. The ability to non-invasively collapse gas vesicles using pressure waves provides a mechanism for erasing their signal and improving their contrast. Subtracting the images before and after acoustic collapse can eliminate background signals enhancing the detection of gas vesicles.

Heterologous expression of gas vesicles in bacterial and mammalian cells enabled their use as the first family of acoustic reporter genes. While fluorescent reporter genes like green fluorescent protein (GFP) had widespread use in biology, their in vivo applications are limited by the penetration depth of light in tissue, typically a few mm. Luminescence can be detected deeper within the tissue, but have a low spatial resolution. Acoustic reporter genes provide sub-millimeter spatial resolution and a penetration depth of several centimeters, enabling the in vivo study of biological processes deep within the tissue.
