= Großer Teufelssee =

Lake in Mecklenburg-Vorpommern, Germany

- Location within Mecklenburg-Vorpommern
- Location: Rostock, Mecklenburg-Vorpommern
- Coordinates: 54.05321°N 12.41911°E
- Basin countries: Germany
- Surface area: 0.205 km^{2} (0.079 sq mi)
- Surface elevation: 37.4 m (123 ft)

Großer Teufelssee is a lake in the Rostock district in Mecklenburg-Vorpommern, Germany. At an elevation of 37.4 m, its surface area is 0.205 km^{2}.
