= Saprotroph =

Type of heterotrophic nutrition based on decayed organic matter

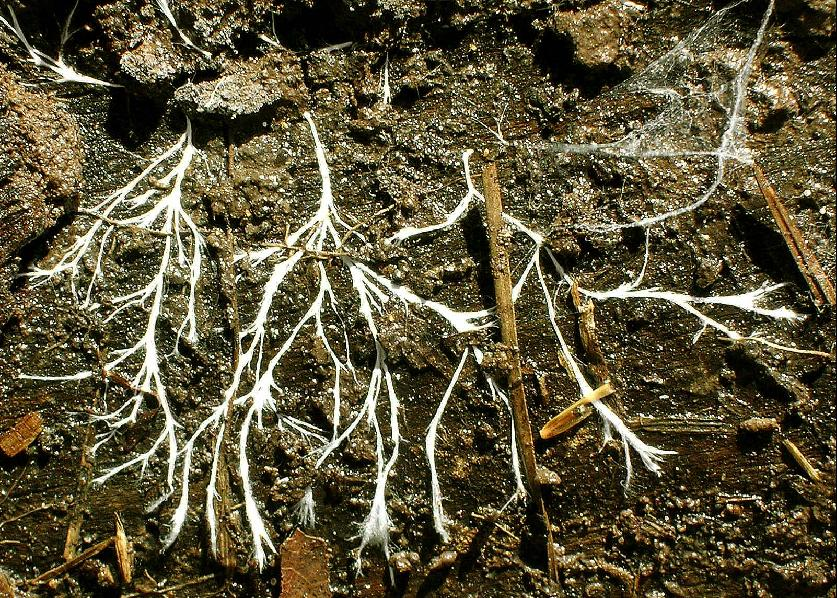
Mycelial cord of fungi made up of a collection of hyphae; an essential part in the process of saprotrophic nutrition, it is used for the intake of organic matter through its cell wall. The network of hyphae (the mycelium) is fundamental to fungal nutrition.

A saprotroph is an organism that feeds on dead organic matter or waste by excreting chemicals to digest it, rather than eating it directly (as detritivores do). Microscopic saprotrophs are sometimes called saprobes.

Saprotrophic digestion is most often performed by fungi (e.g. Mucor) and soil bacteria. In fungi, this is usually done by actively transporting such materials through endocytosis within the internal mycelium and its constituent hyphae.

== Process ==
As matter decomposes within a medium in which a saprotroph is residing, the saprotroph breaks such matter down into its composites.

- Proteins are broken down into their amino acid composites through the breaking of peptide bonds by proteases.
- Lipids are broken down into fatty acids and glycerol by lipases.
- Starch is broken down into pieces of simple disaccharides by amylases.
- Cellulose, a major portion of plant cells, and therefore a major constituent of decaying matter is broken down into glucose.

These products are re-absorbed into the hypha through the cell wall by endocytosis and passed on throughout the mycelium complex. This facilitates the passage of such materials throughout the organism and allows for growth and, if necessary, repair.

=== Conditions ===
In order for a saprotrophic organism to facilitate optimal growth and repair, favourable conditions and nutrients must be present. Optimal conditions refers to several conditions which optimise the growth of saprotrophic organisms, such as;

1. Presence of water: 80–90% of the mass of the fungi is water, and the fungi require excess water for absorption due to the evaporation of internally retained water.
2. Presence of oxygen: Very few saprotrophic organisms can endure anaerobic conditions as evidenced by their growth above media such as water or soil.
3. Neutral-acidic pH: The condition of neutral or mildly acidic conditions under pH 7 are required.
4. Low-medium temperature: The majority of saprotrophic organisms require temperatures between 1 and 35 °C (34 and 95 °F), with optimum growth occurring at 25 °C (77 °F).

The majority of nutrients taken in by such organisms must be able to provide carbon, proteins, vitamins and, in some cases, ions. Due to the carbon composition of the majority of organisms, dead and organic matter provide rich sources of disaccharides and polysaccharides such as maltose and starch, and of the monosaccharide glucose.

=== Wider benefits ===
The Royal Horticultural Society states that saprotrophs recycle nutrients and therefore should be left in gardens if possible.

== See also ==
- Chemoautotrophic nutrition
- Decomposers
- Detritivore
- Holozoic nutrition
- Mycorrhizal fungi and soil carbon storage
- Parasitic nutrition
- Photoautotrophic nutrition
- Saprotrophic bacteria
- Wood-decay fungus
