= Methylocystaceae =

Scientific classification
- Domain: Bacteria
- Kingdom: Pseudomonadati
- Phylum: Pseudomonadota
- Class: Alphaproteobacteria
- Order: Hyphomicrobiales
- Family: Methylocystaceae; Bowman, 2006

Genera
- Albibacter Doronina et al. 2001; Chenggangzhangella Yang et al. 2016; Hansschlegelia Ivanova et al. 2010; Methylocystis (ex Whittenbury et al. 1970) Bowman et al. 1993; Methylopila Doronina et al. 1998; Methylosinus (ex Whittenbury et al. 1970) Bowman et al. 1993

Synonyms
- "Methylopilaceae" Beck et al. 2015

Family of bacteria

The Methylocystaceae are a family of bacteria that are capable of obtaining carbon and energy from methane. Such bacteria are called methanotrophs, and in particular the Methylocystaceae comprise the type II methanotrophs, which are structurally and biochemically distinct from the Methylococcaceae or type I methanotrophs.

In this family methane is oxidized to form formaldehyde, which is assimilated by the serine pathway. This involves combining formaldehyde and glycine to form serine, which may be converted into glyceraldehyde and thus into other organic molecules. They can also fix nitrogen, like many other members of the order Hyphomicrobiales. The cells contained paired internal membranes which are arranged towards their periphery.
