= Pink lake (disambiguation) =

A pink lake is a naturally occurring geological feature, often caused by the presence of algae.

Pink Lake may also refer to:

- Pink Lake (Canada), a lake in Gatineau Park, Quebec
- Pink Lake of Quairading, a lake at Badjaling, near Quairading, Western Australia
- Pink Lake (Victoria), a lake near Dimboola in Victoria, Australia
- Pink Lake (Western Australia), a lake in the Goldfields-Esperance region of Western Australia
- Pink Lake, Western Australia, a suburb of Esperance, Western Australia
- Lake Retba (Senegal), also known as Lac Rose (meaning "pink lake")
- Pink Lake (film), a 2020 drama film
