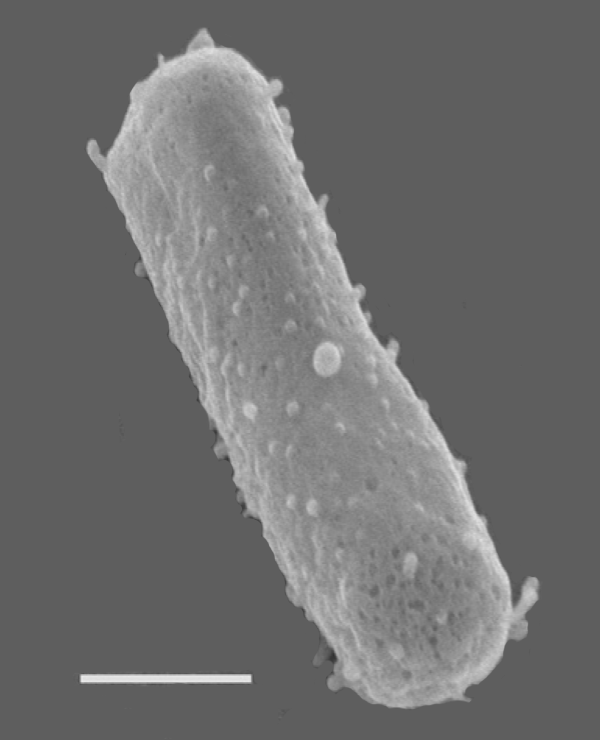
- Halobacterium salinarum NRC-1; Size bar = 270 nm

Scientific classification
- Domain: Archaea
- Kingdom: Methanobacteriati
- Phylum: Methanobacteriota
- Class: Halobacteria
- Order: Halobacteriales
- Family: Halobacteriaceae
- Genus: Halobacterium
- Species: H. salinarum

Binomial name
- Halobacterium salinarum corrig. (Harrison and Kennedy 1922); Elazari-Volcani 1957

Synonyms
- Pseudomonas salinaria Harrison and Kennedy 1922; Serratia salinaria (Harrison and Kennedy 1922) Bergey et al. 1923; Flavobacterium (subgen. Halobacterium) salinarium (Harrison and Kennedy 1922) Elazari-volcani 1940; Halobacter salinaria (Harrison and Kennedy 1922) Anderson 1954; Halobacterium salinarium (Harrison and Kennedy 1922) Elazari-Volcani 1957; Halobacterium halobium (Petter 1931) Elazari-Volcani 1957; Halobacterium cutirubrum (Lochhead 1934) Elazari-Volcani 1957 Halobacterium piscialsi (Yachai et al. 2008)

= Halobacterium salinarum =

Species of archaeon

Halobacterium salinarum, formerly known as Halobacterium cutirubrum or Halobacterium halobium, is an extremely halophilic marine obligate aerobic archaeon. Despite its name, this is not a bacterium, but a member of the domain Archaea. It is found in salted fish, hides, hypersaline lakes, and salterns. As these salterns reach the minimum salinity limits for extreme halophiles, their waters become purple or reddish due to the high densities of halophilic Archaea. H. salinarum has also been found in high-salt food such as salt pork, marine fish, and sausages. The ability of H. salinarum to live at such high salt concentrations has led to its classification as an extremophile.

== Cell morphology and metabolism ==
Halobacteria are single-celled, rod-shaped microorganisms that are among the most ancient forms of life and appeared on Earth billions of years ago. The membrane consists of a single lipid bilayer surrounded by an S-layer. The S-layer is made of a cell-surface glycoprotein that accounts for approximately 50% of the cell surface proteins. These proteins form a lattice in the membrane. Sulfate residues are abundant on the glycan chains of the glycoprotein, giving it a negative charge. The negative charge is believed to stabilize the lattice in high-salt conditions.

Amino acids are the main source of chemical energy for H. salinarum, particularly arginine and aspartate, though they are able to metabolize other amino acids, as well. H. salinarum have been reported to be unable to grow on sugars, and therefore need to encode enzymes capable of performing gluconeogenesis to create sugars. Although H. salinarum is unable to catabolize glucose, the transcription factor TrmB has been proven to regulate the gluconeogenic production of sugars found on the S-layer glycoprotein.

== Adaptation to extreme conditions ==
=== High salt ===
To survive in extremely salty environments, this archaeon—as with other halophilic Archaeal species—utilizes compatible solutes (in particular, potassium chloride) to reduce osmotic stress. Potassium levels are not at equilibrium with the environment, so H. salinarum express multiple active transporters that pump potassium into the cell. At extremely high salt concentrations, protein precipitation will occur. To prevent the salting out of proteins, H. salinarum encodes mainly acidic proteins. The average isoelectric point of H. salinarum proteins is 5.03. These highly acidic proteins are overwhelmingly negative in charge and are able to remain in solution even at high salt concentrations.

=== Low oxygen and phototrophy ===
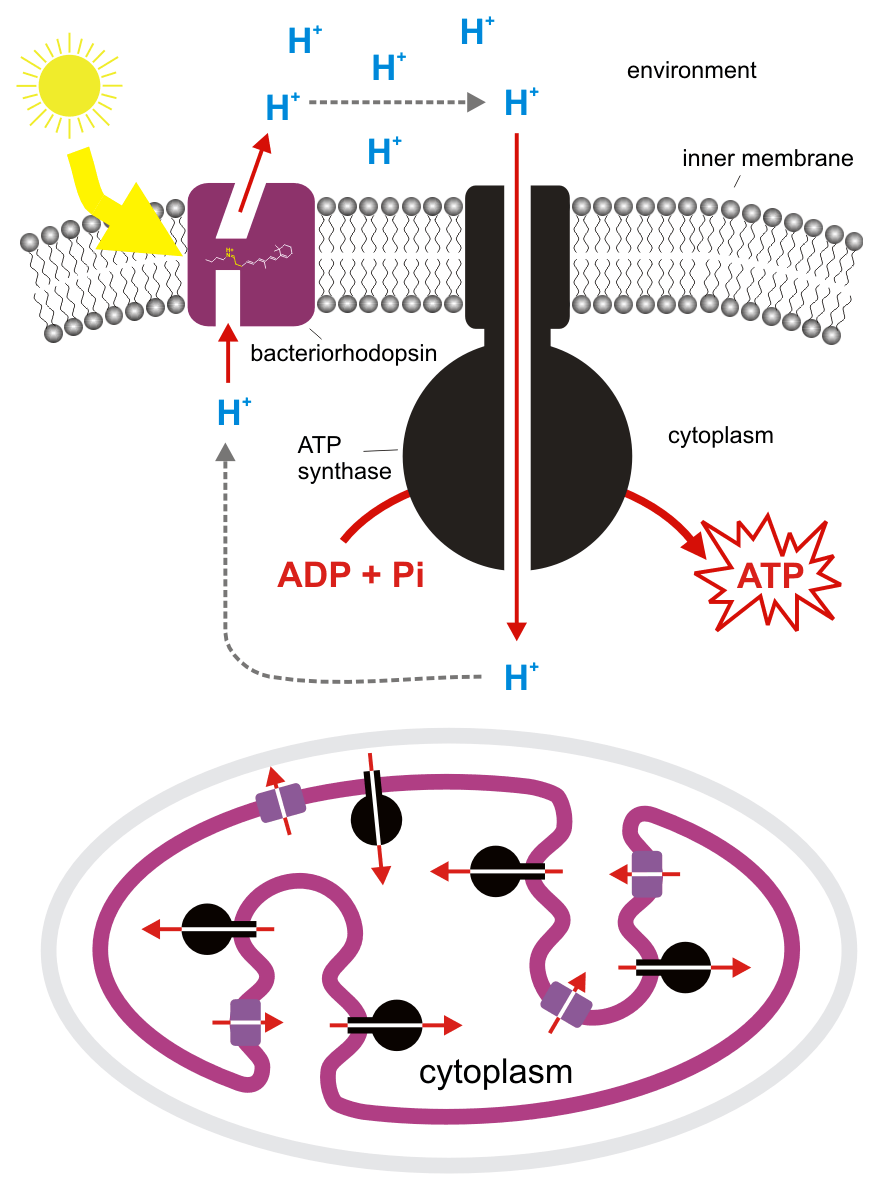
Chemiosmotic coupling between light energy, bacteriorhodopsin and phosphorylation by ATP synthase (chemical energy) during photophosphorylation in Halobacterium salinarum (syn. H. halobium). The archaeal cell wall is omitted.

H. salinarum can grow to such densities in salt ponds that oxygen is quickly depleted. Though it is an obligate aerobe, it is able to survive in low-oxygen conditions by utilizing light energy. H. salinarum expresses the membrane protein bacteriorhodopsin, which acts as a light-driven proton pump. It consists of two parts: the 7-helix transmembrane protein, bacteriorhodopsin, and the light-sensitive cofactor, retinal. Upon absorption of a photon, retinal changes its shape, causing a conformational change in the bacteriorhodopsin protein which drives proton transport. The proton gradient formed is used to generate chemical energy via ATP synthase.

To obtain more oxygen, H. salinarum produce gas vesicles, which allow them to float to the surface where oxygen levels are higher and more light is available. These vesicles are complex structures made of proteins encoded by at least 14 genes. Gas vesicles were first discovered in H. salinarum in 1967.

=== UV protection and color ===
Bacterioruberin

There is little protection from the Sun in salt ponds, so H. salinarum are often exposed to high amounts of UV radiation. To compensate, they have evolved a sophisticated DNA repair mechanism. The genome encodes DNA repair enzymes homologous to those in both bacteria and eukaryotes. This allows H. salinarum to repair damage to DNA faster and more efficiently than other organisms and allows them to be much more UV-tolerant.

Its red color is due primarily to the presence of bacterioruberin, a 50 carbon carotenoid Alcohol (polyol) pigment present within the membrane of H. salinarum. The primary role of bacterioruberin in the cell is to protect against DNA damage incurred by UV light. This protection is not, however, due to the ability of bacterioruberin to absorb UV light. Bacterioruberin protects the DNA by acting as an antioxidant, rather than directly blocking UV light. It is able to protect the cell from reactive oxygen species produced from exposure to UV by acting as a target. The bacterioruberin radical produced is less reactive than the initial radical, and will likely react with another radical, resulting in termination of the radical chain reaction.

H. salinarum has been found to be responsible for the bright pink or red appearance of some bodies of hypersaline lakes, including pink lakes, such as the lake in Melbourne's Westgate Park; with the exact colour of the lake depending on the balance between the alga Dunaliella salina and H. salinarium, with salt concentration having a direct impact. However, recent studies at Lake Hillier in Western Australia have shown that other bacteria, notably Salinibacter ruber, along with algal and other factors, cause the pink color of these lakes. The researchers found 10 species of halophilic bacteria and archaea as well as several species of Dunaliella algae, nearly all of which contain some pink, red or salmon-coloured pigment.

=== Protection against ionizing radiation and desiccation ===
H. salinarum is polyploid and highly resistant to ionizing radiation and desiccation, conditions that induce DNA double-strand breaks. Although chromosomes are initially shattered into many fragments, complete chromosomes are regenerated by making use of over-lapping fragments. Regeneration occurs by a process involving DNA single-stranded binding protein and is likely a form of homologous recombinational repair.

== Genome ==
Whole genome sequences are available for two strains of H. salinarum, NRC-1 and R1. The Halobacterium sp. NRC-1 genome consists of 2,571,010 base pairs on one large chromosome and two mini-chromosomes. The genome encodes 2,360 predicted proteins. The large chromosome is very G-C rich (68%). High GC-content of the genome increases stability in extreme environments. Whole proteome comparisons show the definite archaeal nature of this halophile with additional similarities to the Gram-positive Bacillus subtilis and other bacteria.

== As a model organism ==
H. salinarum is as easy to culture as E. coli and serves as an excellent model system. Methods for gene replacement and systematic knockout have been developed, so H. salinarum is an ideal candidate for the study of archaeal genetics and functional genomics.

== For hydrogen production ==
Hydrogen production using H. salinarum coupled to a hydrogenase donor like E. coli are reported in literature.

== Claimed antiquity of DNA samples ==
In the 1990s there were claims that DNA samples from Halobacteria from salt formations were millions of years old. Later analysis was unable to replicate the findings.

Then in 2009 it was claimed that a sample of a close genetic relative of H. salinarum encapsulated in salt allowed for the recovery of ancient DNA fragments estimated at 121 million years old. The curing salt had been derived from a mine in Saskatchewan, the site of the most recent sample described by Jong Soo Park of Dalhousie University in Halifax, Nova Scotia, Canada. Russell Vreeland of Ancient Biomaterials Institute of West Chester University in Pennsylvania, USA, performed an analysis of all known types of halophilic bacteria, which yielded the finding that Park's bacteria contained six segments of DNA never seen before in halophiles. Vreeland also tracked down the buffalo skin and determined that the salt came from the same mine as Park's sample. He also claimed to discover a halophile estimated at 250 million years old in New Mexico. However, his findings date the crystal surrounding the bacteria, and DNA analysis suggests the bacteria themselves are likely to be less ancient.

In 2022, a study in Nature reported that two-million year old preserved genetic material from many species was found in Greenland, and these sequences are currently considered the oldest confirmed DNA discovered, of any species.
