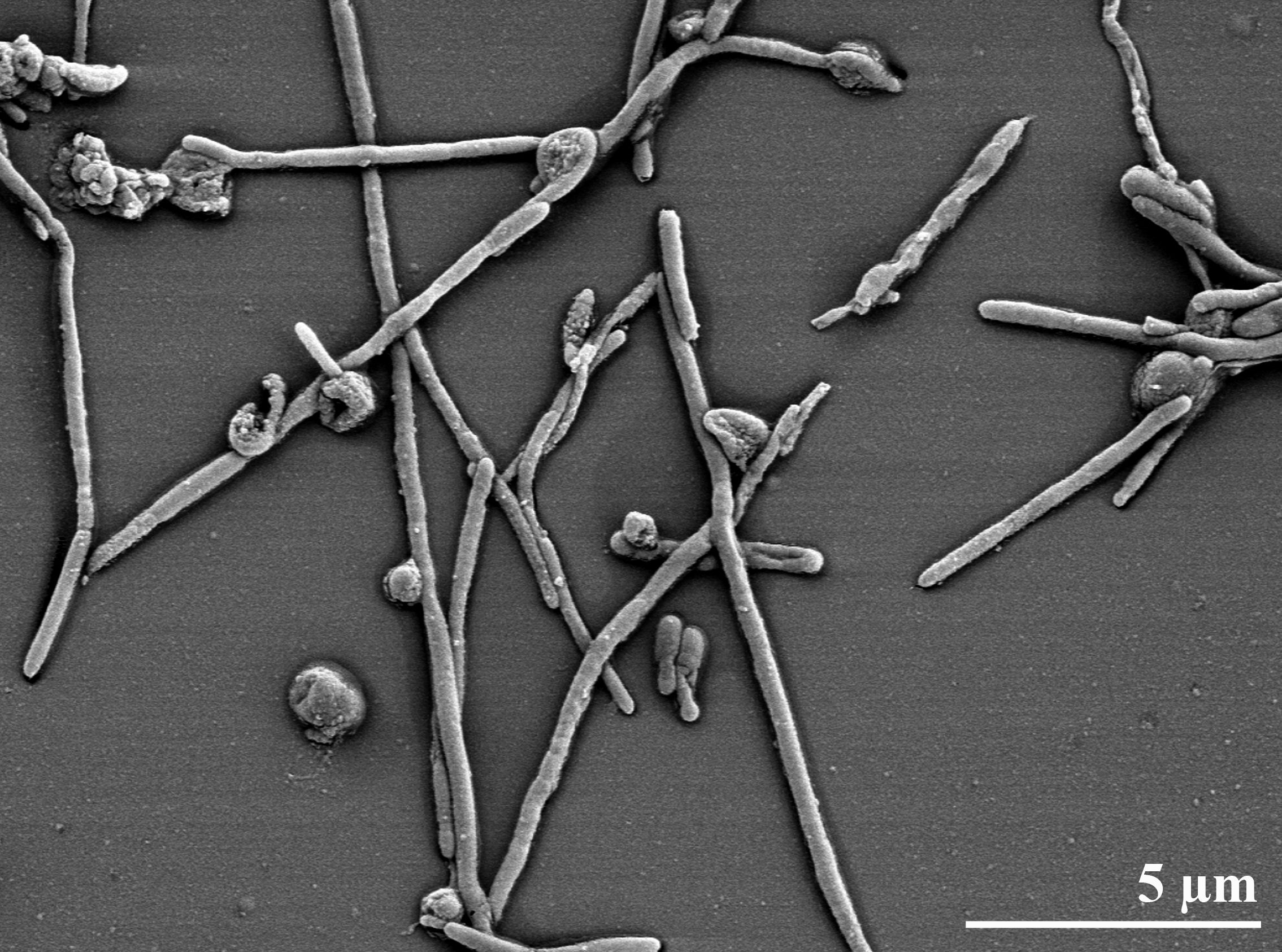

Scientific classification
- Domain: Bacteria
- Kingdom: Pseudomonadati
- Phylum: Rhodothermota
- Class: Rhodothermia
- Order: Rhodothermales
- Family: Rhodothermaceae
- Genus: Rhodothermus
- Species: R. marinus

Binomial name
- Rhodothermus marinus Alfredsson et al. 1995

= Rhodothermus marinus =

Species of bacterium

Rhodothermus marinus is a species of bacteria. It is obligately aerobic, moderately halophilic, thermophilic, Gram-negative and rod-shaped, about 0.5 μm in diameter and 2-2.5 μm long.
