= Pink lake =

Pink lake phenomenon and examples

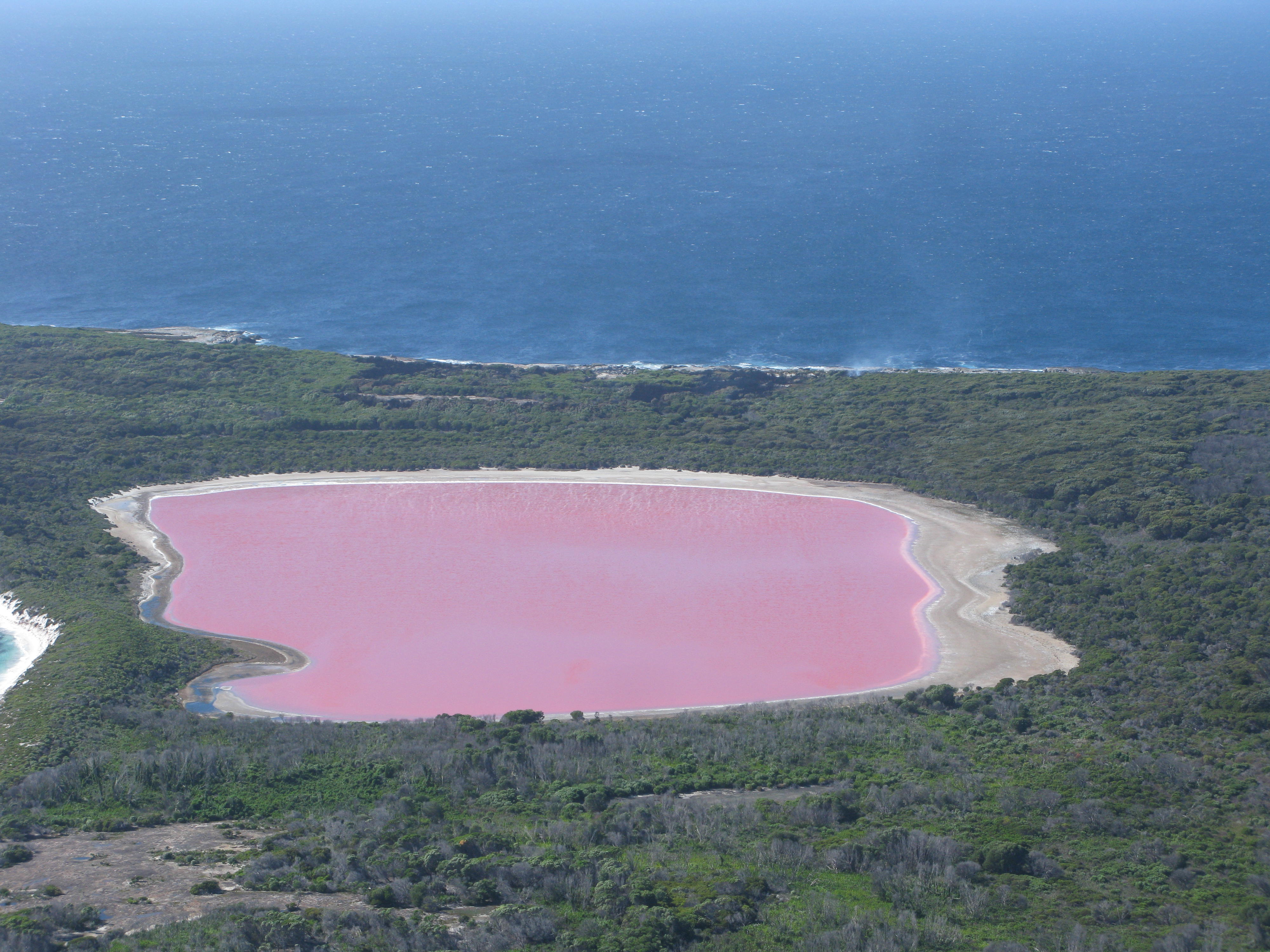
Lake Hillier, Western Australia

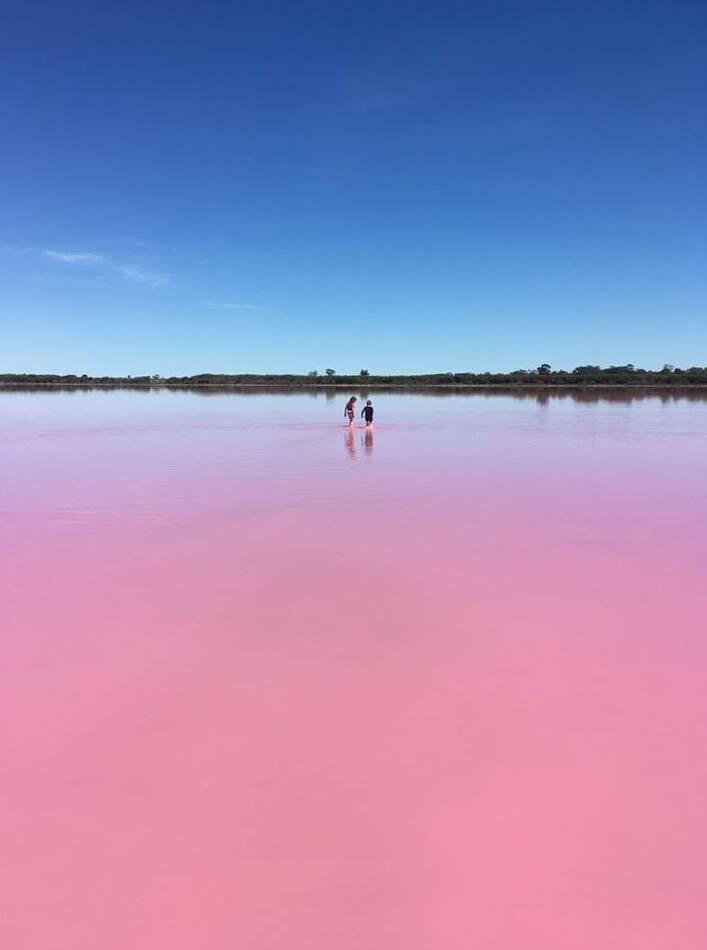
Pink Lake, Victoria, Australia

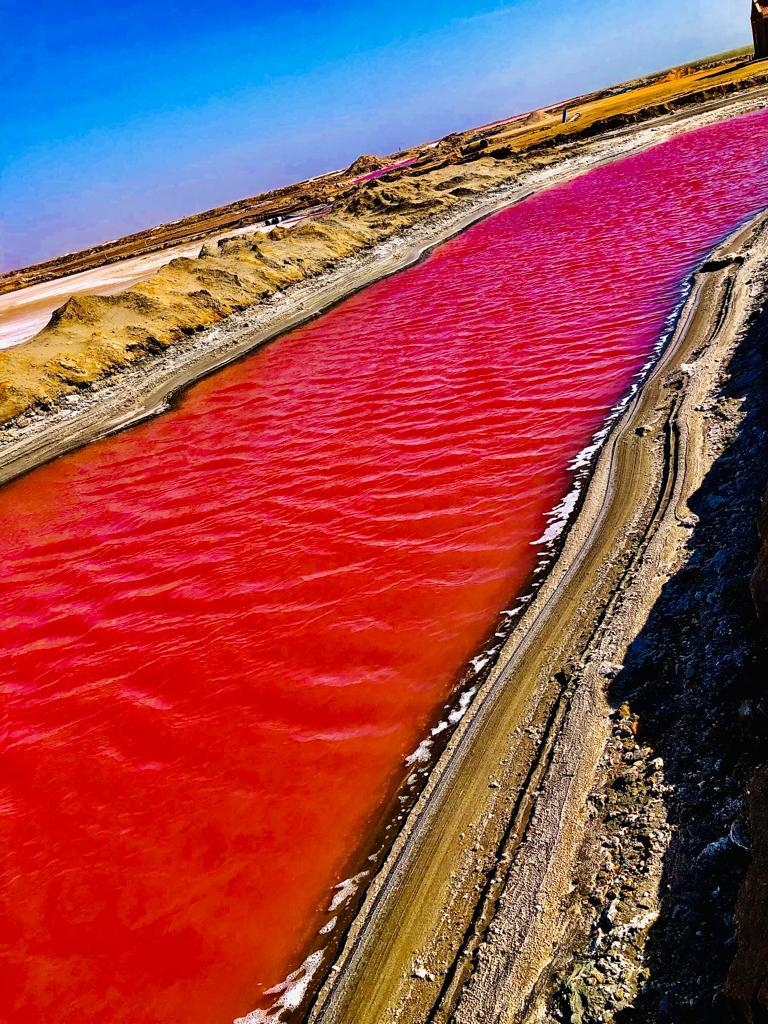
Pink lake in Namibia

A pink lake is a lake that has a red or pink colour. This is often caused by the presence of salt-tolerant algae that produces carotenoids, such as Dunaliella salina, usually in conjunction with specific bacteria and archaea, which may vary from lake to lake. The most common archaeon is Halobacterium salinarum.

== Causes ==
Pink lakes arise from a combination of factors, which include climate and hydrology of the continent beneath them, in particular the level of salinity. The orange/pink colour of salt lakes across the world has often been attributed to the green alga Dunaliella salina, but other work has shown that bacteria or archaea are also involved.

=== Alga ===
Dunaliella salina is the most halophilic (salt-tolerant) alga known and can grow in salinity as high as 35% NaCl (in comparison to seawater, which contains approximately 3% NaCl). The single-celled green alga plays a key role in primary production in hypersaline environments around the world. At high salinity, temperature, and light, this alga accumulates the red carotenoid pigment, beta-carotene. This is the same pigment that gives carrots, which contain 0.3% of beta-carotene, their colour. D. salina can adapt to a very wide range of concentrations of salt. The beta-carotene protects the alga against damage from high light, coating the green chlorophyll and giving the alga an orange/red colour. The alga, which was found not to contain a high intracellular concentration, was named after Michel Félix Dunal who first recognised the red colour of certain salt lakes in France was due to an organism.

It was thought for a long time that the colour of pink lakes was the result of this alga, as it has been found in many pink lakes.

=== Bacteria/archaea ===
Some bacteria and archaea also produce a carotenoid pigment within their cell membranes, which may either contribute to or be the only cause of the pink colouration.

In some of the hundreds of Australian pink lakes, a red bacterium, Salinibacter ruber, may be involved in producing their colour. Work done on Lake Hillier, on Middle Island in Western Australia, led by molecular biologist Ken McGrath in 2015 showed that, while D. salina was present in only tiny quantities (0.1% of DNA sampled), while S. ruber formed 20 to 33% (Note: Conflicting reports of percentage.) of the DNA recovered from the lake. They found 10 species of halophilic bacteria and archaea as well as several species of Dunaliella algae, nearly all of which contain some pink, red or salmon-coloured pigment.

Molecular biologist Ken McGrath, while researching the loss of colour of the lake since the 1990s (attributed to excessive salt harvesting from it), has a hunch that all pink lakes are caused by S. ruber, rather than D. salina, but proving this is challenging, because bacteria are so much smaller and more difficult to find than algae. A project is being planned to pump more salt into the lake from local agricultural land, where high salinity is a problem. Lake Retba in Senegal, in West Africa, contains the same bacterium.

S. ruber produces a pigment called bacterioruberin, which helps it to trap and use light for energy in the photosynthesis process. While the pigments in algae are contained within the chloroplasts, bacterioruberin is spread across the whole cell of the bacterium. This makes it more likely that the colour of the lake is that of S. ruber.

The archaeon Halobacterium salinarum (formerly Halobacterium cutirubrum), which is pink in colour and generally grows within the salt crust on the bottom of the lake, has been found to be involved in the colour of some pink lakes, such as the lake in Melbourne's Westgate Park. The exact colour of the lake depends on the balance between D. salina and H. salinarium, with salt concentration having a direct impact.

== Characteristics ==
The majority of pink salt lakes change their colour which is often linked to rainfall. A lake in Westgate Park, Melbourne, Australia, was coloured pink in March 2017 and then again in September 2019, but since then and as of January 2022 had taken on a dark green hue. Warmer weather and lower rainfall appears to make it turn pink. As water evaporates, the salinity increases, but salinity is not the only factor at work. Sediment and the organisms living in the lake affect its colour, and the shade of pink that it takes on.

Pink lakes such as Lake Hillier can be up to ten times saltier than seawater (the Dead Sea in Israel is around nine times so). It is safe to swim in Lake Hillier, but it is not advisable to drink it owing to the effect of its hypersalinity on the human body, and the possibility of micro-organisms which may be harmful to human health. In 2022 extreme rainfall events linked to climate change temporarily diluted Lake Hillier's hypersalinity, disturbing the pigment-producing microbial community and causing the lake to turn blue-gray; scientists expect the pink colour to return within the next decade as evaporation restores salinity levels.

== Examples ==
=== Africa ===
- Kleinzee Yacht Club in Kleinzee, Northern Cape, South Africa
- Lake Natron near Mount Kilimanjaro, Tanzania
- Lake Magadi in the Kenyan Rift Valley, Kenya
- Lake Retba or Lac Rose, in Senegal

=== Americas ===
- Dusty Rose Lake in British Columbia, Canada
- Great Salt Lake North Basin, Utah, United States
- Laguna Colorada, Bolivia
- On the Yucatán Peninsula, Mexico

=== Asia ===
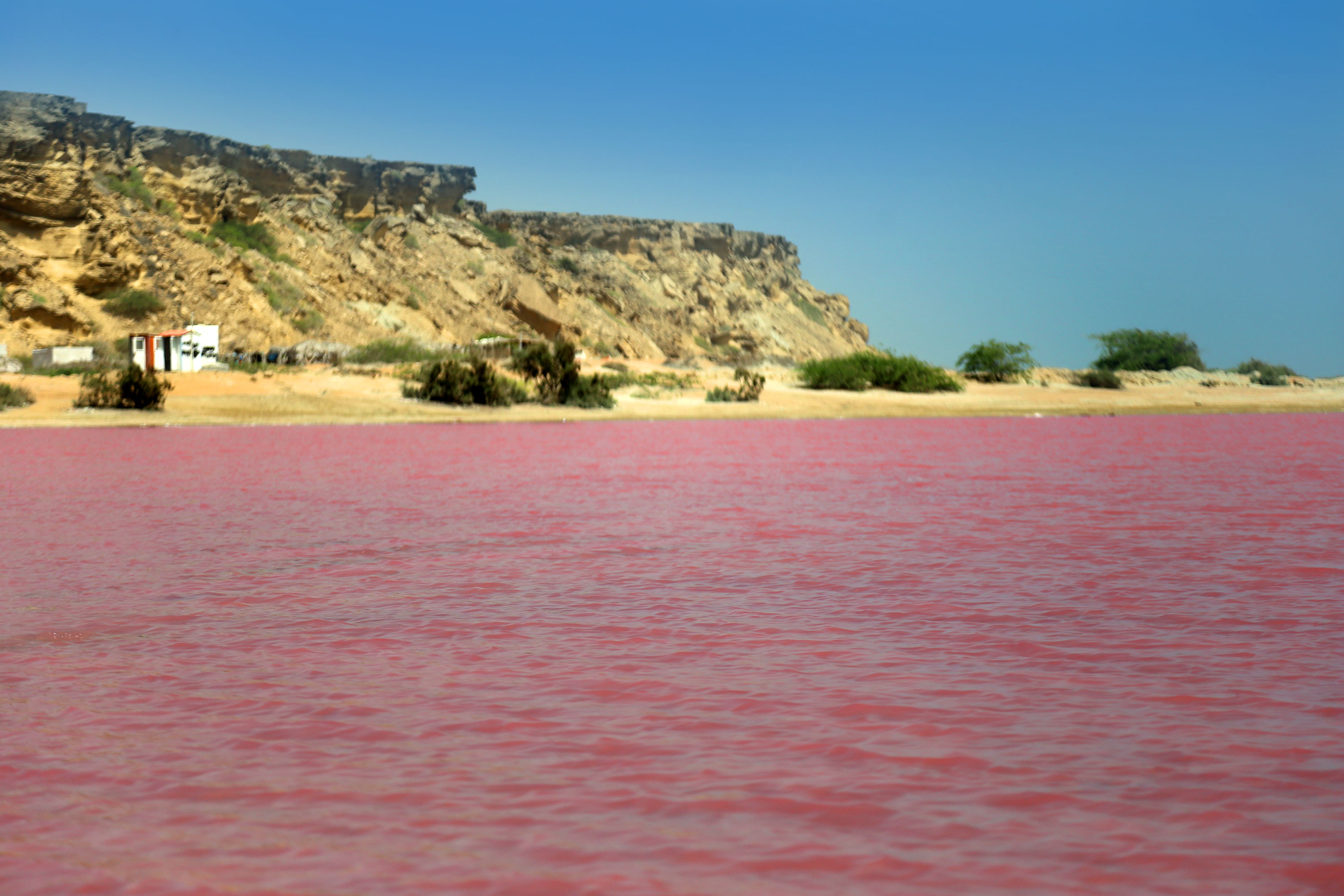
Lipar Pink Wetland, Chabahar, Iran

- Aralsor, Kazakhstan
- Burlinskoye, Altai Krai, Siberia, Russia
- Koryakovka (lake), Kazakhstan
- Krasnovishnevoye, Novosibirsk Oblast, Russia
- Lipar Pink Wetland in the Chabahar, Sistan, Iran
- Lonar Lake in Maharashtra, India
- Malinovoye, Altai Krai, Siberia, Russia
- Masazirgol (Masazir Lake), near Baku, Azerbaijan
- Maharloo Lake near Shiraz, Iran

=== Australasia ===
- Champagne Pool, Waiotapu thermal region, New Zealand
- Hutt Lagoon in midwest Western Australia, covering 70 km^{2} (27 sq mi)
- Lake Bumbunga near Lochiel, South Australia
- Lake Grassmere, near Marlborough, New Zealand
- Lake Hillier in the Recherche Archipelago, Western Australia
- Pink Lake (Western Australia) near Esperance
- Pink Lake (Quairading), at Badjaling, near Quairading, WA
- Pink Lake (Victoria) in the Murray-Sunset National Park, in the state of Victoria, Australia

=== Europe ===
- Koyashskoye Salt Lake, on the southern coast of Kerch Peninsula, Crimea, Ukraine
- Las Salinas de Torrevieja, near Torrevieja in Alicante province, Spain
- Lake Lemuria, in the Kherson region of Ukraine
- Les Salins d'Aigues-Mortes, in the Camargue in France
- Pačir lake, Bačka Topola, Serbia

== See also ==
- Watermelon snow
