= Pink Lake (Victoria) =

Australian salt lake

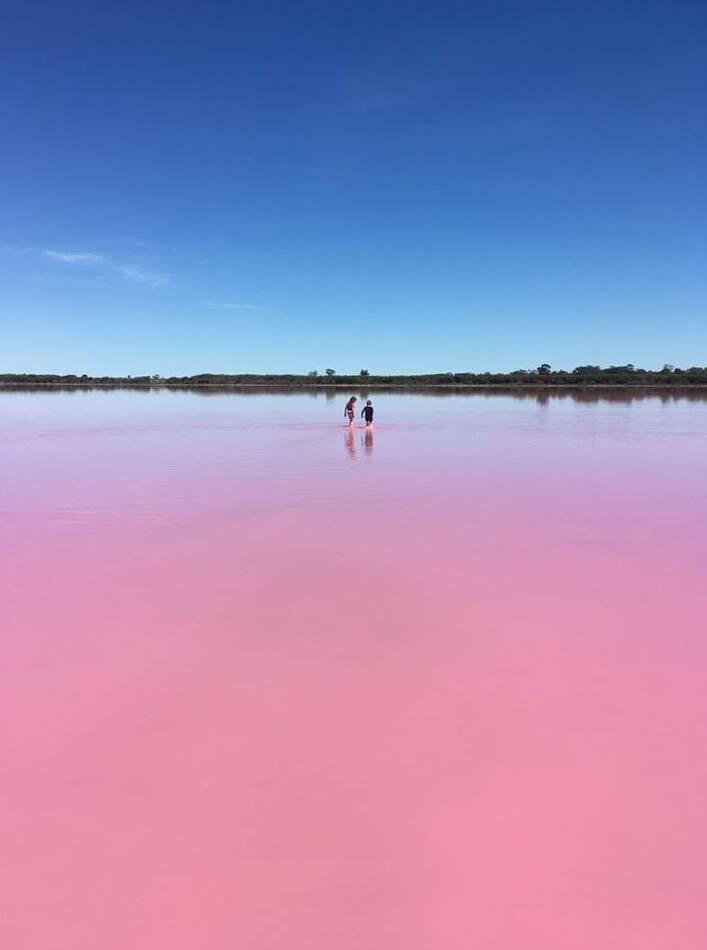
- Pink Lake, 2015

- Location in Victoria
- Location: Dimboola, Victoria
- Coordinates: 36°25′05″S 141°57′40″E
- Type: Salt lake
- Basin countries: Australia
- Max. length: 2 km (1 mi)
- Max. width: 2 km (1 mi)
- Surface area: 45 ha (111 acres)
- Surface elevation: 250 m (820 ft)

Pink Lake (historically known as Lake Lochiel or Lake Bumbunga) is a small, circular, salty pink lake on the Western Highway just north of Dimboola, Australia. Granville Stapylton, part of the explorer Thomas Mitchell's 1836 expedition into western Victoria, reconnoitered Pink Lake on 20 July 1836.

The lake received its name from its distinctive pink colour. The brightness of the hue varies according to the level of rainfall. Until recently it was assumed that red algae created the pink hue; however, recent research reported by Australian Geographic describes the colour as result of a pigment produced by the Salinibacter ruber bacteria.

A rest-stop overlooks the lake's basin.

Salt has been harvested from the lake since the 1860s and on average 20 tonnes a year are harvested by the Mount Zero Olives company working in conjunction with the Barengi Gadjin Land Council. Commercial harvesting stopped in the 1970s but was resumed after negotiations between the Victorian State government, the Barengi Gadjin Land Council and the Mount Zero Olives Company in 2009.

== See also ==
- Lake Hillier
- Lake Spencer
