= Pink Lake (Western Australia) =

Salt lake in the Goldfields–Esperance region, Western Australia

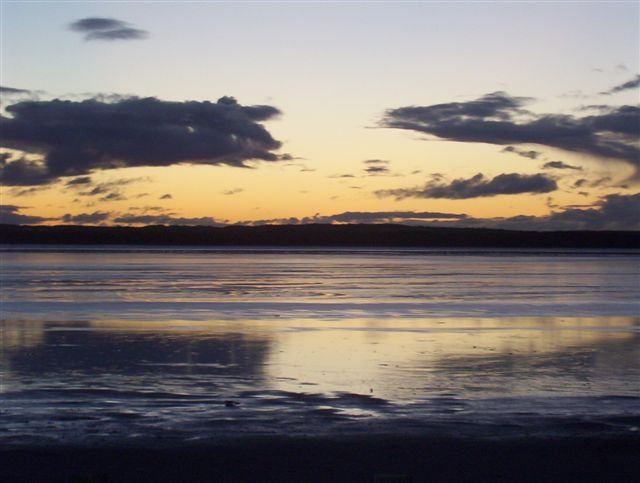
- Pink Lake at sunset

- Location within Western Australia
- Interactive map of Pink Lake
- Location: Goldfields-Esperance, Western Australia
- Coordinates: 33°50′43″S 121°49′40″E
- Type: Salt lake
- Basin countries: Australia
- Max. length: 4 km (2 mi)
- Max. width: 2 km (1 mi)
- Surface area: 99 ha (245 acres)
- Surface elevation: 0 m (0 ft)

Pink Lake (previously known as Lake Spencer) is a salt lake in the Goldfields–Esperance region of Western Australia. Although historically the water in the lake was visibly pink, as of 2017, it had not been pink for over 10 years. Salt concentration is vital to Pink Lake's pink hue, and Pink Lake may turn pink again as conditions change. It lies about 3 kilometres (2 mi) west of Esperance and is bounded to the east by the South Coast Highway.

The dynamics of why a lake turns pink are very complex. External changes and weather conditions can affect the colour of the lake. Esperance's Pink Lake has lost its pink colour due to salinity changes caused by human activity.

== Description ==
The distinctive colour of the water changes is a result of green alga Dunaliella salina, halobacterium Halobacterium cutirubrum, and/or high concentration of brine prawns. Once the lake water reaches a salinity level greater than that of sea water, the temperature is high enough, and adequate light conditions are provided, the alga begins to accumulate the red pigment beta carotene. The pink halobacteria grow in the salt crust at the bottom of the lake.

The construction of the South Coast Highway and Esperance railway line are believed to have altered the flow of water into the lake, reducing its salinity, which is why (as of 2017) it no longer appears pink.

== Name ==
In 1848, explorer John Septimus Roe named the waterway Lake Spencer after Sir Richard Spencer, a resident magistrate in Albany who contributed to the early formation of the colony of Western Australia. Lake Warden, adjacent, is recorded as having been named after Sir Richard Spencer's wife, Lady Ann Warden Spencer.

The lake has displayed a distinct pink hue in the past and was colloquially referred to as Pink Lake until 1966, when the shire president, WS Paterson, submitted a request to the Geographic Names Committee, which was successful and resulted in Lake Spencer officially becoming Pink Lake. For many years, Pink Lake was a tourist attraction in the Esperance region, with the surrounding area, an arterial road, and local businesses adopting the name.

=== Misleading name ===
Because tourists who visit Esperance to see the Pink Lake are disappointed not to see a pink lake, proposals have been made to either change the name of the lake and the town back to Lake Spencer or to find a way to alter the salinity so that the lake appears pink once again.

=== Confusion with Lake Hillier ===
Lake Hillier is located on Middle Island in the Recherche Archipelago off the coast of Cape Arid, east of Esperance. Lake Hillier is well known for its bright pink hue that contrasts with the deep blue of the ocean. The island is managed by the Western Australian government and is accessible by boat and air.

== History ==
Historically, Pink Lake was the terminal lake in the Lake Warden wetland system, where water from the central suite of lakes (Wheatfield, Woody, and Windabout) and Lake Warden would periodically flush into Pink Lake, bringing accumulated salts into the environment.

Increasing salt concentrations combined with decreasing water levels from evaporation during summer trigger the appearance of the pink hue that can be seen in lakes across the country. Pink Lake lost its connection to Lake Warden and the eastern lakes with the construction of the railway line and South Coast Highway.

Commercial salt mining, which began in 1896 and ceased in 2007, reduced salt levels in the lake. Further reductions to the lake's salt concentration were caused by fresh water entering the system, through a combination of surface water inflow and increased groundwater inflow due to clearing in the catchment area associated with nearby subdivisions.

=== Salt production ===
Prior to salt production, the lake's environment was investigated in the 1980s. Table salt is produced in solar ponds at the eastern end of the lake. The company WA Salt Supply produces water-softening salt, coarse salt, and sheepskin salt at the Esperance site. The salt is kiln dried, crushed, and bagged at the site before being distributed.

== Birds ==
The lake has been identified by BirdLife International as an important bird area because it usually supports significant numbers of hooded plovers and sometimes over 1% of the world population of banded stilts. It has had many migrant and native birds. Between 1997 and 2006, populations ranging between 12 and 12,000 of the banded stilt were recorded. A population between five and 68 of the hooded plovers existed there from 1995 to 2005.
