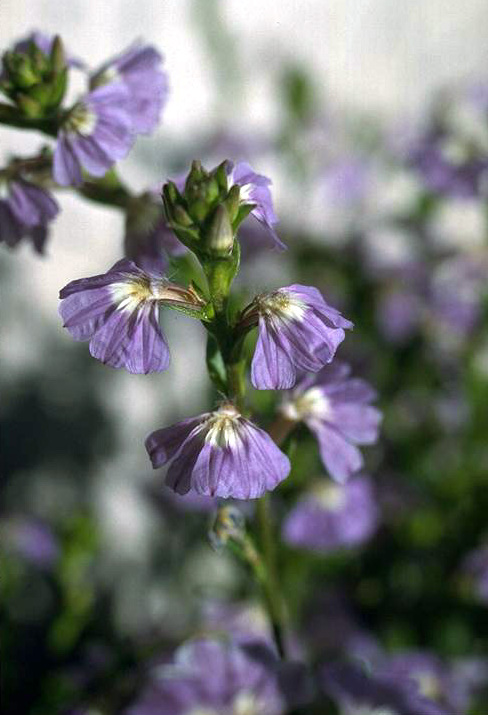
- At the Pink Lake, near Esperance

Scientific classification
- Kingdom: Plantae
- Clade: Embryophytes
- Clade: Tracheophytes
- Clade: Spermatophytes
- Clade: Angiosperms
- Clade: Eudicots
- Clade: Asterids
- Order: Asterales
- Family: Goodeniaceae
- Genus: Scaevola
- Species: S. cuneiformis

Binomial name
- Scaevola cuneiformis Labill.
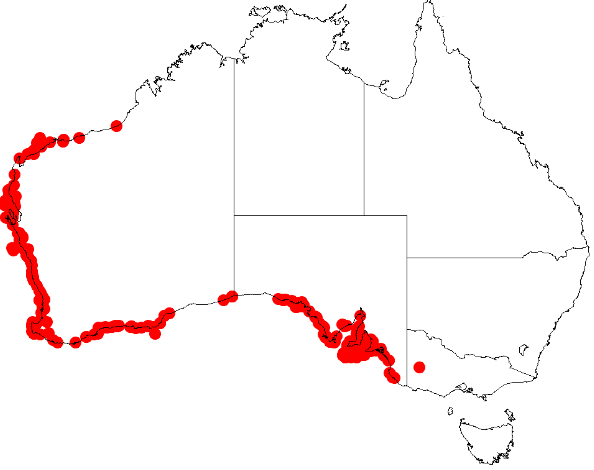
- Occurrence data from Australasian Virtual Herbarium

Synonyms
- Lobelia cuneiformis (Labill.) Kuntze nom. illeg.; Merkusia cuneiformis (Labill.) de Vriese

= Scaevola cuneiformis =

Species of plant

Scaevola cuneiformis, commonly known as wedge-leaved scaevola, is a species of flowering plant in the family Goodeniaceae, and is native to the south of Western Australia. It is an erect shrub with sessile, egg-shaped, toothed leaves, spikes of mauve to blue flowers and rough, hairy, egg-shaped fruit.

== Description ==
Scaevola cuneiformis is an erect shrub that typically grows up to 60 cm (24 in) high and is covered with fine, white hairs pressed against the surface. Its leaves are sessile, egg-shaped and toothed, 6–35 mm (0.24–1.38 in) long and 4–16 mm (0.16–0.63 in) wide. The flowers are borne in dense, leafy thyrses or panicles 150 mm (5.9 in) long with overlapping, leaf-like bracts at the base, and linear bracteoles 4–6 m (13–20 ft) long. The sepals are more or less round, fused at the base and up to 6.5 mm (0.26 in) long. The petals are mauve to blue, 8–12 mm (0.31–0.47 in) long, covered with white hairs pressed against the outside surface, bearded inside with wings about 1 mm (0.039 in) wide. Flowering occurs from September to November, and the fruit is rough, 3.5 mm (0.14 in) long, covered with soft hairs, and usually has a single seed.

== Taxonomy ==
Scaevola cuneiformis was first formally described in 1805 by Jacques Labillardière in his Novae Hollandiae Plantarum Specimen. The specific epithet (cuneiformis) means 'wedge-shaped', referring to the leaves.

== Distribution and habitat ==
Wedge-leaved scaevola grows in sandy soils between Esperance and the Fitzgerald River National Park in the Coolgardie, Esperance Plains and Mallee bioregions in the south of Western Australia.
