= Acacia nitidula =

Conservation status
- Priority Three — Poorly Known Taxa (DEC)

Scientific classification
- Kingdom: Plantae
- Clade: Tracheophytes
- Clade: Angiosperms
- Clade: Eudicots
- Clade: Rosids
- Order: Fabales
- Family: Fabaceae
- Subfamily: Caesalpinioideae
- Clade: Mimosoid clade
- Genus: Acacia
- Species: A. nitidula

Binomial name
- Acacia nitidula Benth.
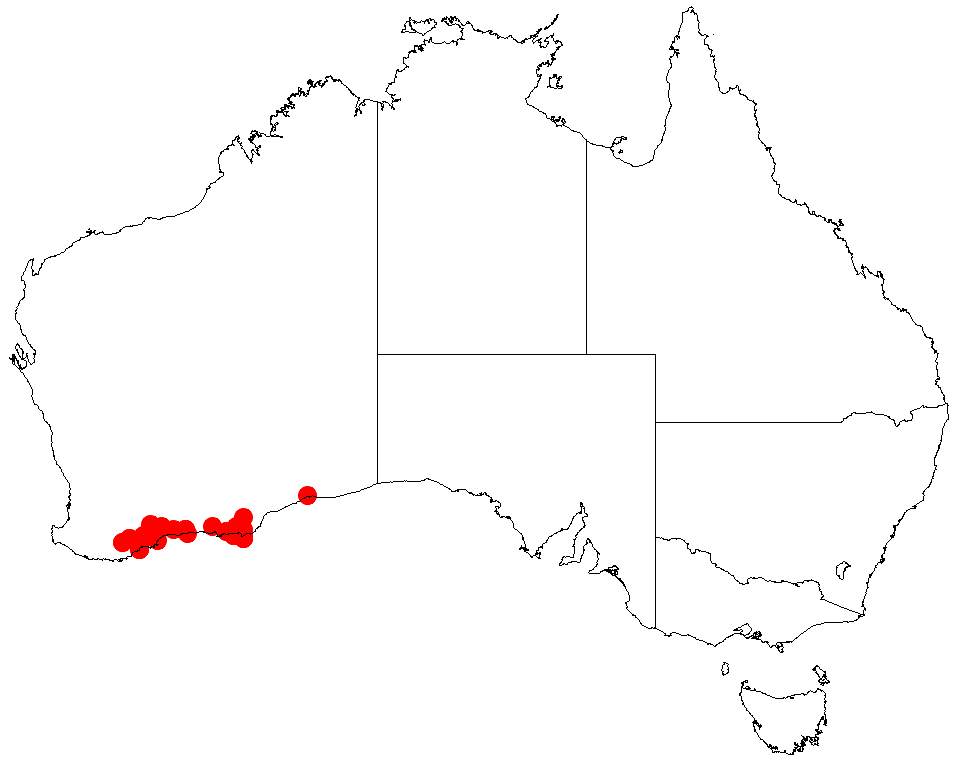
- Occurrence data from AVH

Synonyms
- Racosperma nitidulum (Benth.) Pedley

Species of legume

Acacia nitidula is a species of flowering plant in the family Fabaceae, and is endemic to the south coast of Western Australia. It is a shrub with ascending, narrowly lance-shaped phyllodes with the narrower end towards the base, spherical heads of golden yellow flowers and linear, wavy, leathery pods.

== Description ==
Acacia nitidula is shrub that typically grows to a height of 0.6–2 m (2 ft 0 in – 6 ft 7 in) and has slightly angled branchlets near the end, and sometimes a few soft hairs pressed against the surface. Its phyllodes are ascending, narrowly lance-shaped with the narrower end towards the base, straight to slightly curved, 15–30 mm (0.59–1.18 in) long, mostly 2–5 mm (0.079–0.197 in) wide and glabrous with two veins on each surface. There are awl-shaped stipules 1.0–1.5 mm (0.039–0.059 in) long at the base of the phyllodes, but fall off early. The flowers are arranged in two spherical heads in axils, each on a peduncle 7–11 mm (0.28–0.43 in) long. Each head is 3.5–4.0 mm (0.14–0.16 in) in diameter, with 20 golden yellow flowers. The pods are linear, wavy, up to 45 mm (1.8 in) long, 4.0–4.5 mm (0.16–0.18 in) wide, leathery and glabrous. The seeds are widely elliptic, 3 mm (0.12 in) long, and dull with an aril near the end.

== Taxonomy ==
Acacia nitidula was first formally described in 1864 by George Bentham in his Flora Australiensis. The specific epithet (nitidula) means 'little shining'.

== Distribution and habitat ==
This species of wattle grows near granite boulders and in granitic gravel in Cape Arid National Park and nearby Middle Island.

== Conservation status ==
Acacia nitidula is listed as 'Priority Three' by the Government of Western Australia Department of Parks and Wildlife, meaning that it is poorly known and known from only a few locations but is not under imminent threat.

== See also ==
- List of Acacia species
