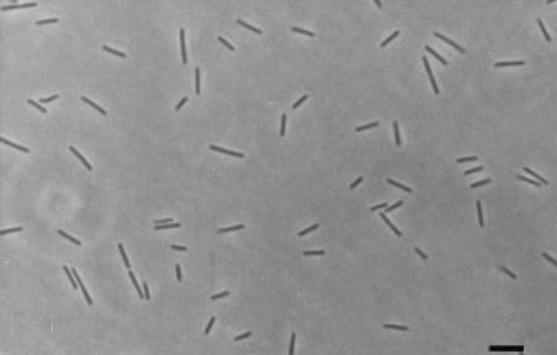

Scientific classification
- Domain: Bacteria
- Kingdom: Pseudomonadati
- Phylum: Rhodothermota
- Class: Rhodothermia
- Order: Rhodothermales
- Family: Salinibacteraceae
- Genus: Salinibacter
- Species: S. ruber

Binomial name
- Salinibacter ruber Antón et al., 2002

= Salinibacter ruber =

Species of bacterium

Salinibacter ruber is an extremely halophilic red bacterium, first found in Spain in 2002.

== Taxonomy ==
Salinibacter ruber is most closely related to the genus Rhodothermus which is a thermophilic, slightly halophilic bacterium. Though genetically it is considered to be closest to the Rhodothermus genus, it is most comparable to the family Halobacteriaceae, because of similarity in protein structure. It is red-pigmented, motile, rod-shaped, and extremely halophilic. The type strain is strain M31^{T}(= DSM 13855^{T} = CECT 5946^{T}).

== Habitat ==
Salinibacter ruber was found in saltern crystallizer ponds in Alicante and Mallorca, Spain in 2002 by Antón et al. This environment has very high salt concentrations, and Salinibacter ruber itself cannot grow at below 15% salt concentration, with an ideal concentration between 20 and 30% (i.e. 200-300 grams of salt per litre, the average concentration in the ocean being around 35 g/L). It has also been found in pink lakes in Australia.

This bacterium is notable for its halophilic lifestyle, a trait exhibited primarily by members of Archaea. In general, bacteria do not play a large role in microbial communities of hypersaline brines at or approaching NaCl saturation. However, with the discovery of S. ruber, this belief was challenged. It was found that S. ruber made up from 5% to 25% of the total prokaryotic community of the Spanish saltern ponds.

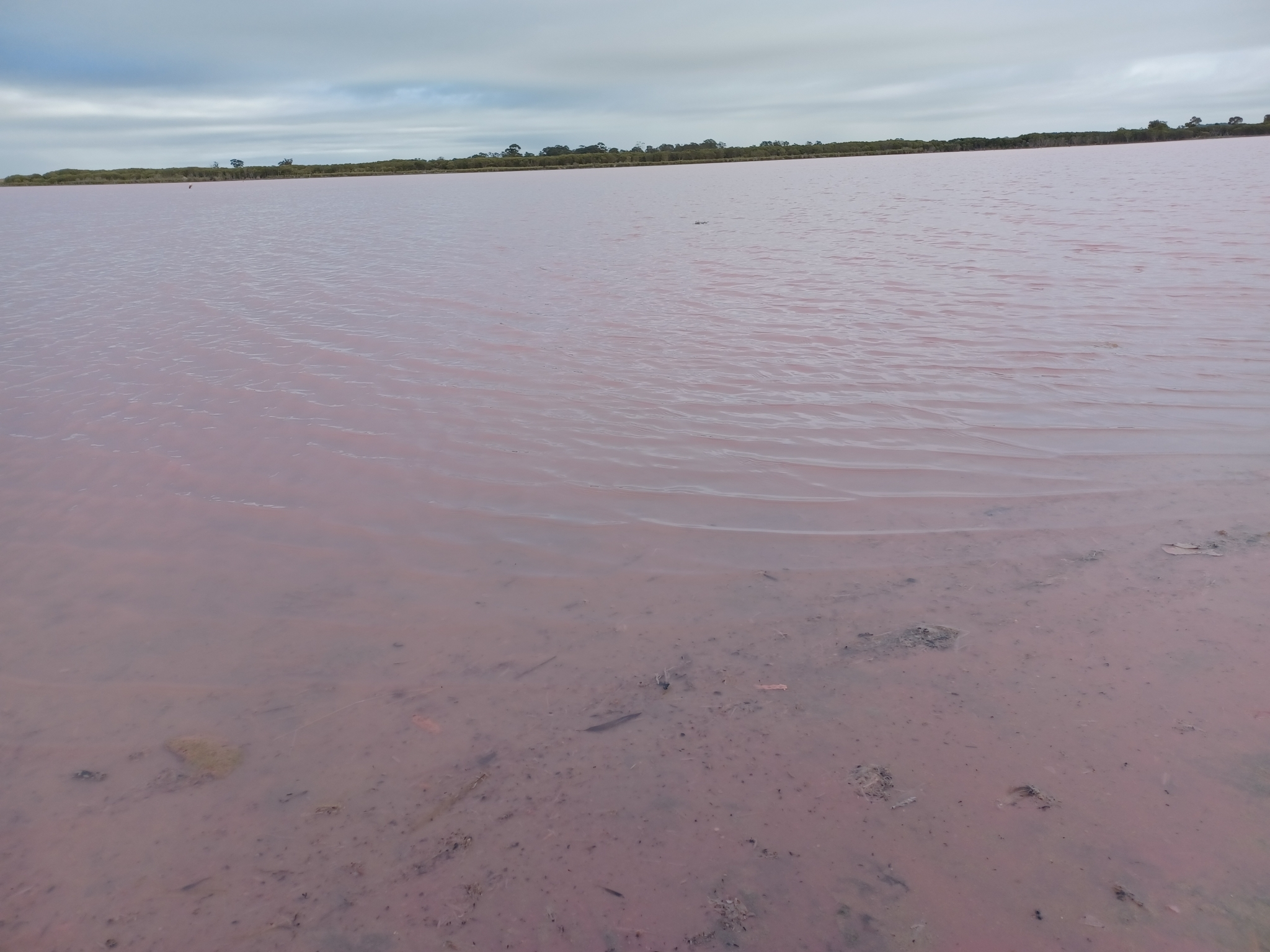
Salinibacter ruber bloom in pink lake

== Characteristics ==
In a 2015 study conducted by researchers led by molecular biologist Ken McGrath at Lake Hillier, Western Australia, showed that, while the algae Dunaliella salina, formerly thought to create the color in this pink lake, was present in only tiny quantities (0.1% of DNA sampled), while S. ruber formed 20 to 33% (Note: Conflicting reports of percentage.) of the DNA recovered from the lake.

Salinibacter ruber produces a pigment called bacterioruberin, which helps it to trap and use light for energy in the photosynthesis process. While the pigments in algae are contained within the chloroplasts, bacterioruberin is spread across the whole cell of the bacterium. This makes it more likely that the colour of the lake is that of S. ruber.
