= Barengi Gadjin Land Council Aboriginal Corporation =

Australian aboriginal corporation

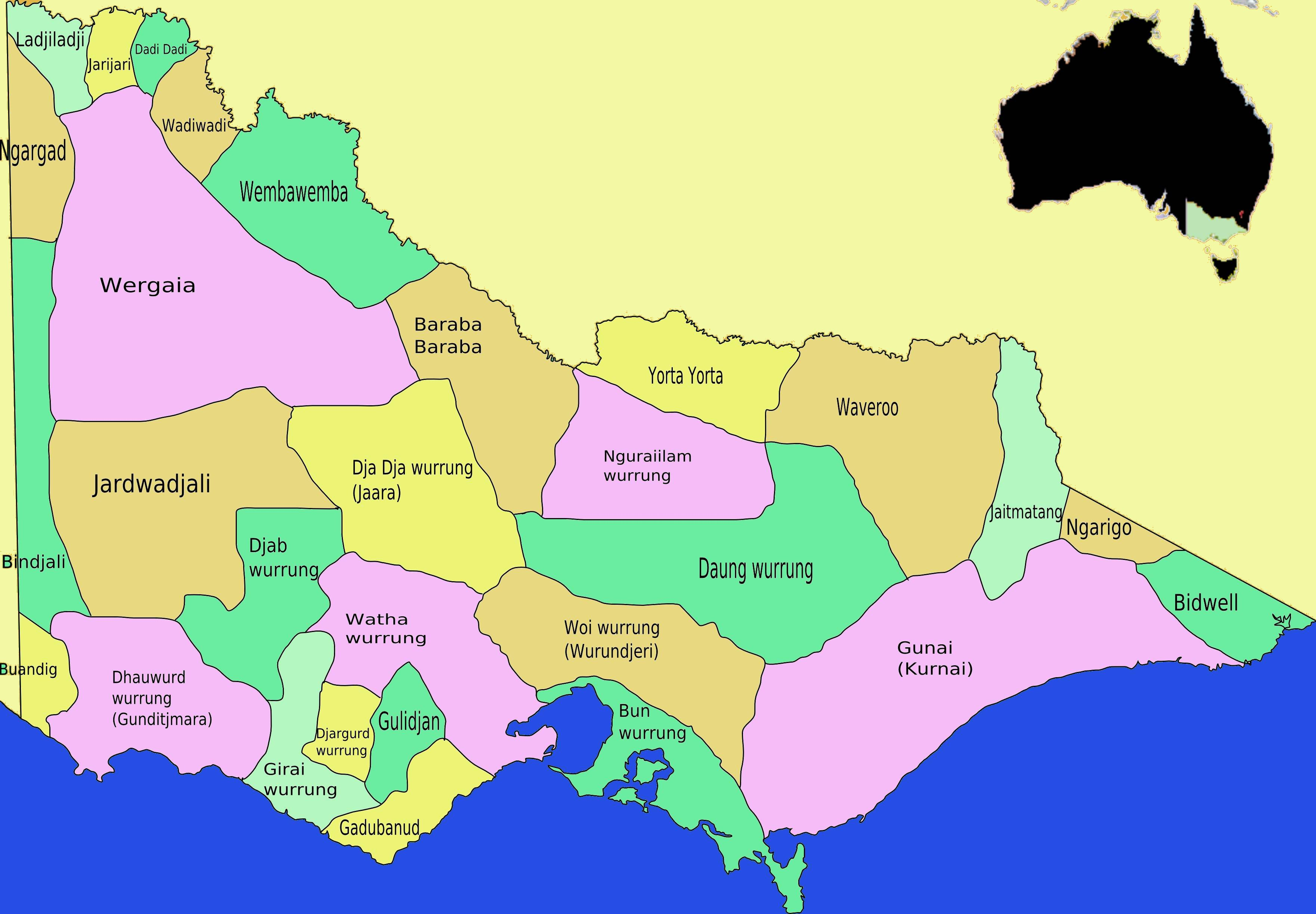
Aboriginal Victorians' language territories

The Barengi Gadjin Land Council was formed in 2005 to represent the Wotjobaluk, Jardwadjali (also known as Jaadwa), Wergaia and Jupagalk peoples. The Council manages native title rights across Western Victoria in an area "roughly described as the Wimmera River from the head of the Yarriambiack Creek through to Outlet Creek at the northern end of Lake Albacutya". The Council is governed by a board of directors representing various family groups and has offices in Wail and Horsham. The current chairperson is Dylan Clark.

The Land Council condemned graffiti at Aboriginal sites in the Grampians National Park and lodged a native title claim for permission to hunt inside the Park in 2016.

== See also ==
- Pink Lake
