= Rhodothermus =

Scientific classification
- Domain: Bacteria
- Kingdom: Pseudomonadati
- Phylum: Rhodothermota
- Class: Rhodothermia
- Order: Rhodothermales
- Family: Rhodothermaceae
- Genus: Rhodothermus; Alfredsson et al. 1995

Type species
- Rhodothermus marinus Alfredsson et al. 1995

Species
- R. bifroesti; "R. clarus"; R. marinus; R. profundi

Genus of bacteria

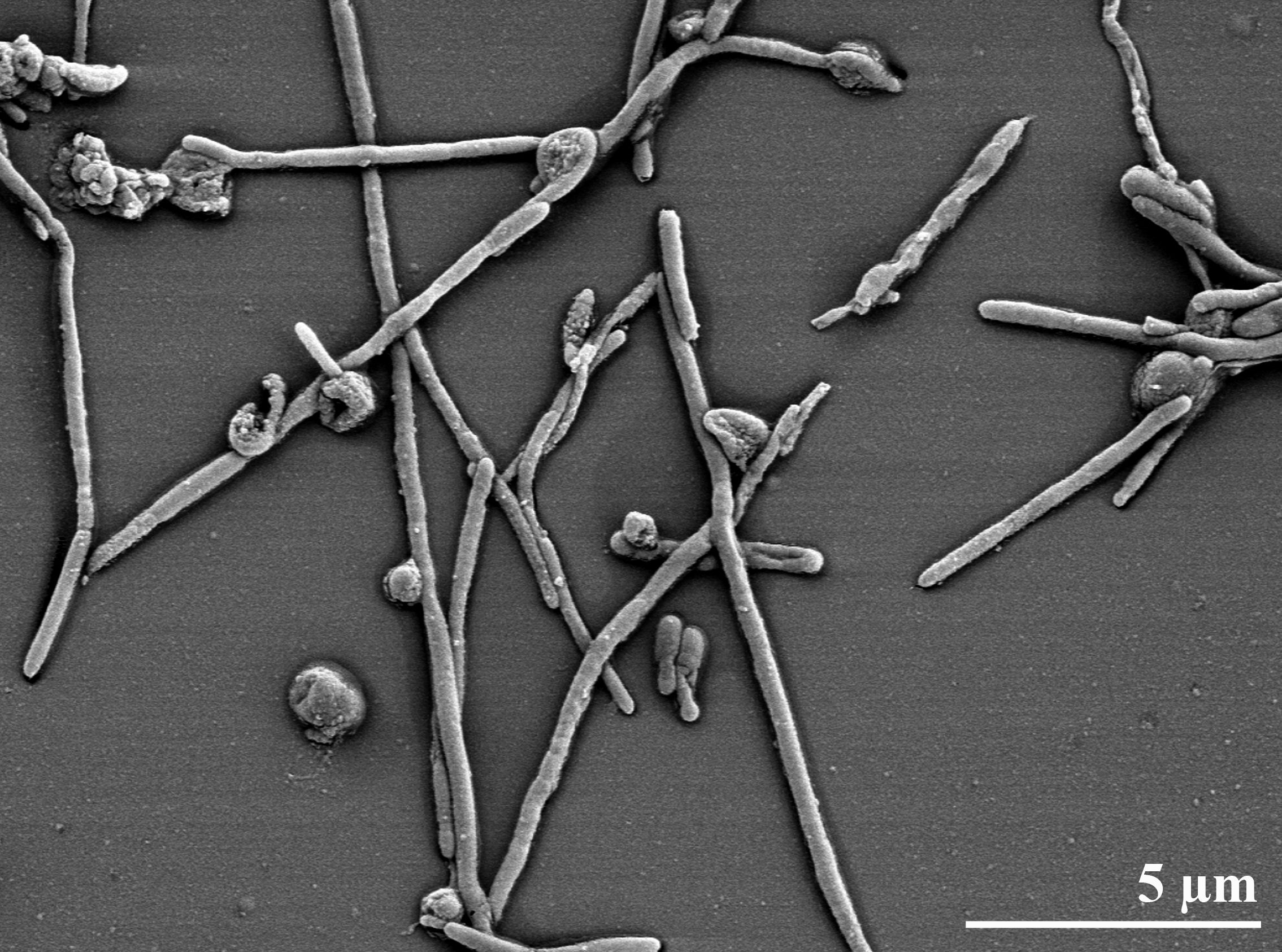
Rhodothermus bacteria

Rhodothermus is a genus of bacteria.

== Phylogeny ==
The currently accepted taxonomy is based on the List of Prokaryotic names with Standing in Nomenclature (LPSN) and National Center for Biotechnology Information (NCBI).

16S rRNA based LTP_08_2023

- Rhodothermus
  - R. bifroesti Bergsten et al. 2022
  - - R. marinus Alfredsson et al. 1995
    - R. profundi Marteinsson et al. 2010

120 marker proteins based GTDB 10-RS226

- Rhodothermus
  - R. bifroesti
  - - R. marinus
    - R. profundi

Unassigned species:

- "R. clarus" Kawaichi et al. 2006

== See also ==
- List of bacterial orders
- List of bacteria genera
