= Rubricoccaceae =

Scientific classification
- Domain: Bacteria
- Kingdom: Pseudomonadati
- Phylum: Rhodothermota
- Class: Rhodothermia
- Order: Rhodothermales
- Family: Rubricoccaceae; Munoz, Rossello-Mora & Amann 2016

Genera
- Rubricoccus; Rubrivirga

Family of bacteria

Rubricoccaceae is a family of bacteria in the order Rhodothermales. The family contains two genera, Rubricoccus and Rubrivirga.

== Phylogeny ==
The currently accepted taxonomy is based on the List of Prokaryotic names with Standing in Nomenclature (LPSN) and National Center for Biotechnology Information (NCBI).

16S rRNA based LTP_10_2024

- Rubricoccaceae
  - Rubricoccus Park et al. 2011
  - Rubrivirga Park et al. 2013

120 marker proteins based GTDB 10-RS226

- Rubricoccaceae
  - Rubricoccus
  - Rubrivirga

== See also ==
- List of bacteria genera
- List of bacterial orders
