= Rhodothermaceae =

Scientific classification
- Domain: Bacteria
- Kingdom: Pseudomonadati
- Phylum: Rhodothermota
- Class: Rhodothermia
- Order: Rhodothermales
- Family: Rhodothermaceae; Ludwig et al. 2012

Genera
- Rhodothermus

Family of bacteria

The Rhodothermaceae are a family of bacteria.

== See also ==
- List of bacterial orders
- List of bacteria genera
