= Lake Hillier =

Pink-coloured lake in Western Australia

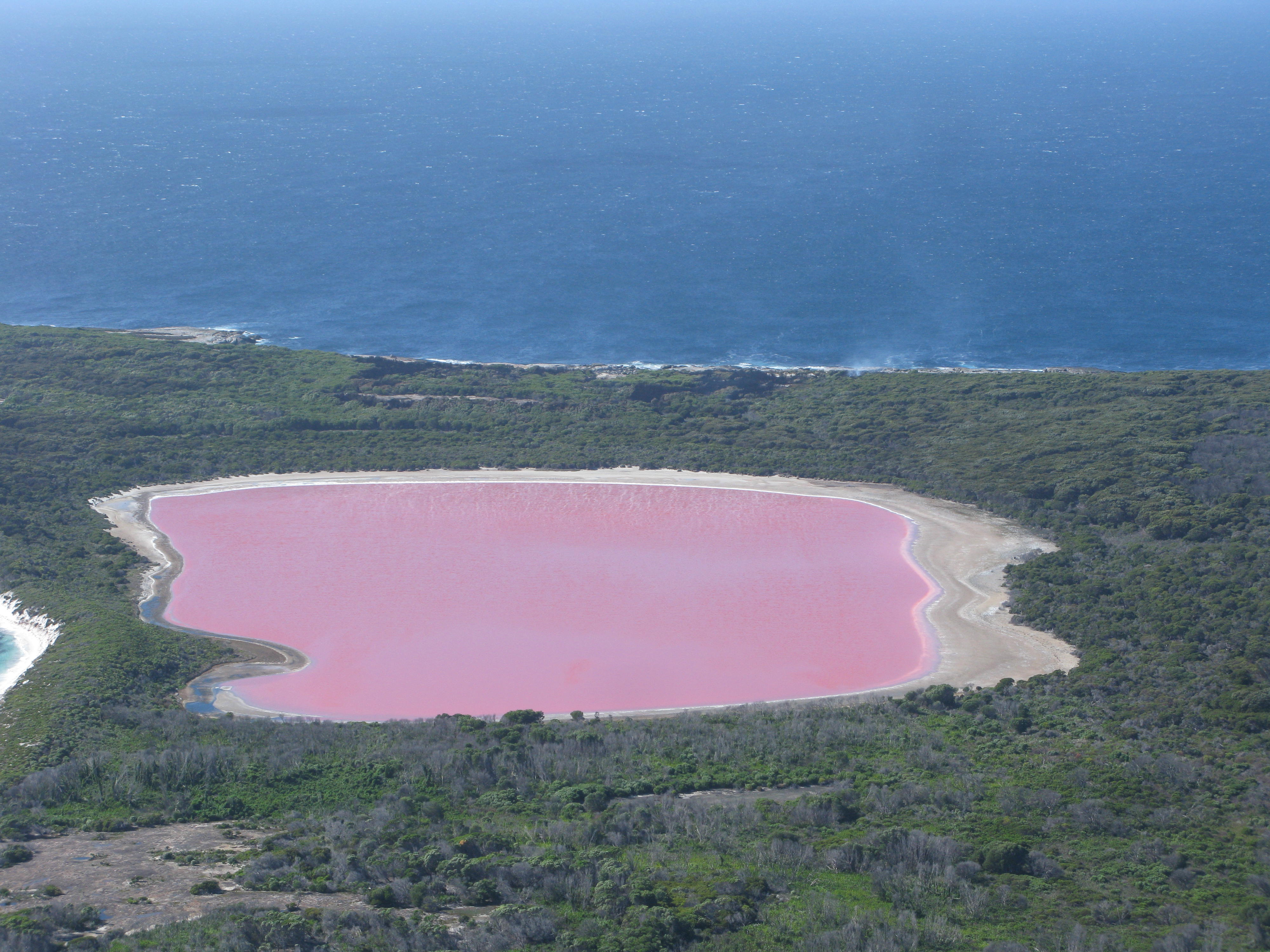

- Location in Western Australia Lake Hillier (Australia)
- Interactive map of Lake Hillier
- Location: Goldfields-Esperance, Western Australia
- Coordinates: 34°05′45″S 123°12′10″E
- Type: Salt lake
- Basin countries: Australia
- Designation: Recherche Archipelago Nature Reserve
- Max. length: 600 m (2,000 ft)
- Max. width: 250 m (820 ft)
- Surface area: 15 ha (37 acres)

Lake Hillier is a saline lake on the edge of Middle Island, the largest of the islands and islets that make up the Recherche Archipelago in the Goldfields-Esperance region, off the south coast of Western Australia. It is particularly notable for its pink colour. A long and thin shore divides the Southern Ocean (by some definitions, the Indian Ocean) from the lake.

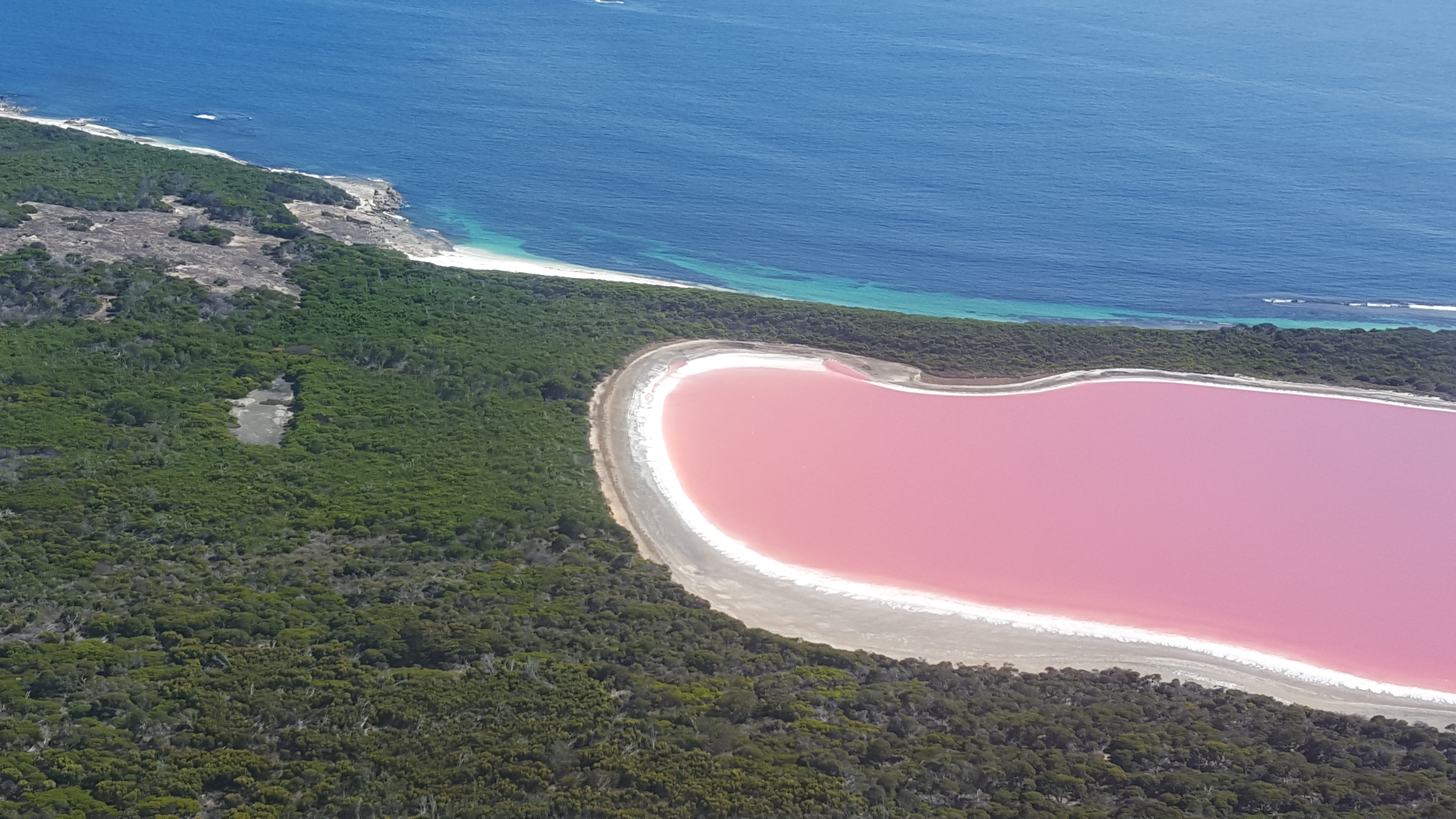
Lake Hillier on Middle Island off the coast of Esperance

== Description ==
Lake Hillier is about 600 metres (2,000 ft) in length by about 250 m (820 ft) in width. The lake is surrounded by a rim of sand and a dense woodland of paperbark and eucalyptus trees with a narrow strip of sand dunes covered by vegetation separating its northern edge from the northern coast of Middle Island. The most notable feature of the lake is its pink, vibrant colour. The vibrant colour is permanent, and does not alter when the water is taken in a container. The pink colour is believed to be due to the presence of the organism Dunaliella salina. The Extreme Microbiome Project, part of the Association of Biomolecular Resource Facilities, Metagenomics Research Group, has performed a metagenomic analysis on the lake to find Dunaliella as well as Salinibacter ruber, Dechloromonas aromatica, and a few species of the Archaea.

In recent years, Lake Hillier's iconic pink colour has noticeably faded, partially due to a high volume of rainfall diluting the lake's salt levels. However, scientists believe the change in appearance is only temporary, with the colour expected to return as water levels decrease.

== History ==
=== European discovery and use ===
Lake Hillier was visited by the Matthew Flinders expedition on 15 January 1802. Flinders's journal entries are considered to be the first written records of the lake. Flinders observed the pink lake after ascending the island's highest peak (now called Flinders Peak), describing the lake as follows:

In the north-eastern part was a small lake of a rose colour, the water of which, as I was informed by Mr. Thistle who visited it, was so saturated with salt that sufficient quantities were crystallised near the shores to load a ship. The specimen he brought on board was of a good quality, and required no other process than drying to be fit for use.

Flinders visited Middle Island again in May 1803; he intended "to stop a day or two in Goose-Island Bay, for the purposes of procuring geese for our sick people, seal oil for our lamps, and a few casks of salt from the lake on Middle Island". It is reported that Flinders subsequently named the lake after William Hillier, a crew member of HMS Investigator who died of dysentery on 20 May 1803 prior to the expedition's departure from Middle Island.

In 1889, Edward Andrews investigated the commercial possibilities of producing salt from Lake Hillier, and briefly moved onto the island with both of his sons. They left after working the salt deposits for about one year.

The lake was subject to salt mining during the late 19th century. The salt mining enterprise is reported as failing for a number of reasons including "the toxicity of the salt collected for consumption".

== Forms of life ==
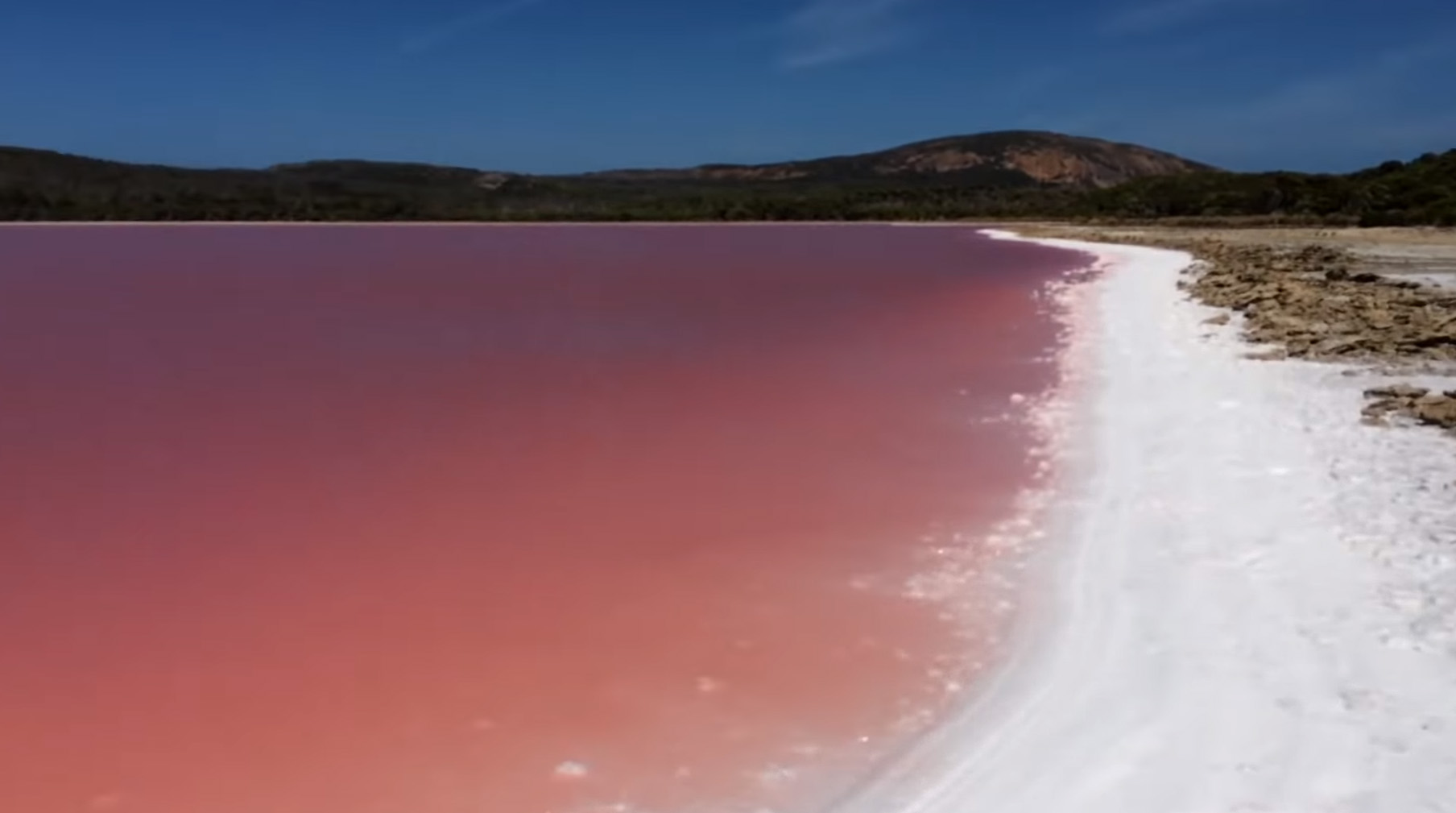
Lake Hillier shoreline

The only living organisms in Lake Hillier are microorganisms including Dunaliella salina, red algae which cause the salt content in the lake to create a red dye which helps produce the bright pink colour, as well as red halophilic bacteria, bacterioruberin, present in the salt crusts. Despite the unusual hue, the lake exhibits no known adverse effects upon humans. From above, the lake appears a solid bubble gum pink, but from the shoreline it appears more of a clear pink hue. The shoreline is also covered in salt crust deposits. In 2015, scientists from the Extreme Microbiome Project conducted extensive microbiome and metagenomic DNA sequencing and detected Haloquadratum, Haloferax, Salinibacter, Halobacterium, Halogeometricum, and several other halophilic organisms. Culturing from the water revealed a low concentration of Psychroflexus as well.

== Safety and accessibility ==
Despite the high salt content levels (comparable to those of the Dead Sea), Lake Hillier is safe to swim in. Scenic tours of Lake Hillier generally do not stop at the island, and there are no regular services that allow direct access to the lake.

There are very few ways to view Lake Hillier. Aeroplane scenic flights are the most common method, with six flights a day departing Esperance Airport, flying over Lake Hillier via the nearby Cape Le Grand National Park. Cruises are also an option for passengers wanting to view the isolated lake, and surrounding forest area.

== Protected area status ==
As recently as 2012, Lake Hillier has been located within the boundaries of the Recherche Archipelago Nature Reserve. Since 2002, the lake itself has been considered to be a wetland of "subregional significance".

== See also ==
- List of lakes of Australia § Western Australia
- Lake Retba
