= Recherche Archipelago Nature Reserve =

Nature reserve in Western Australia

- IUCN category Ia (strict nature reserve)
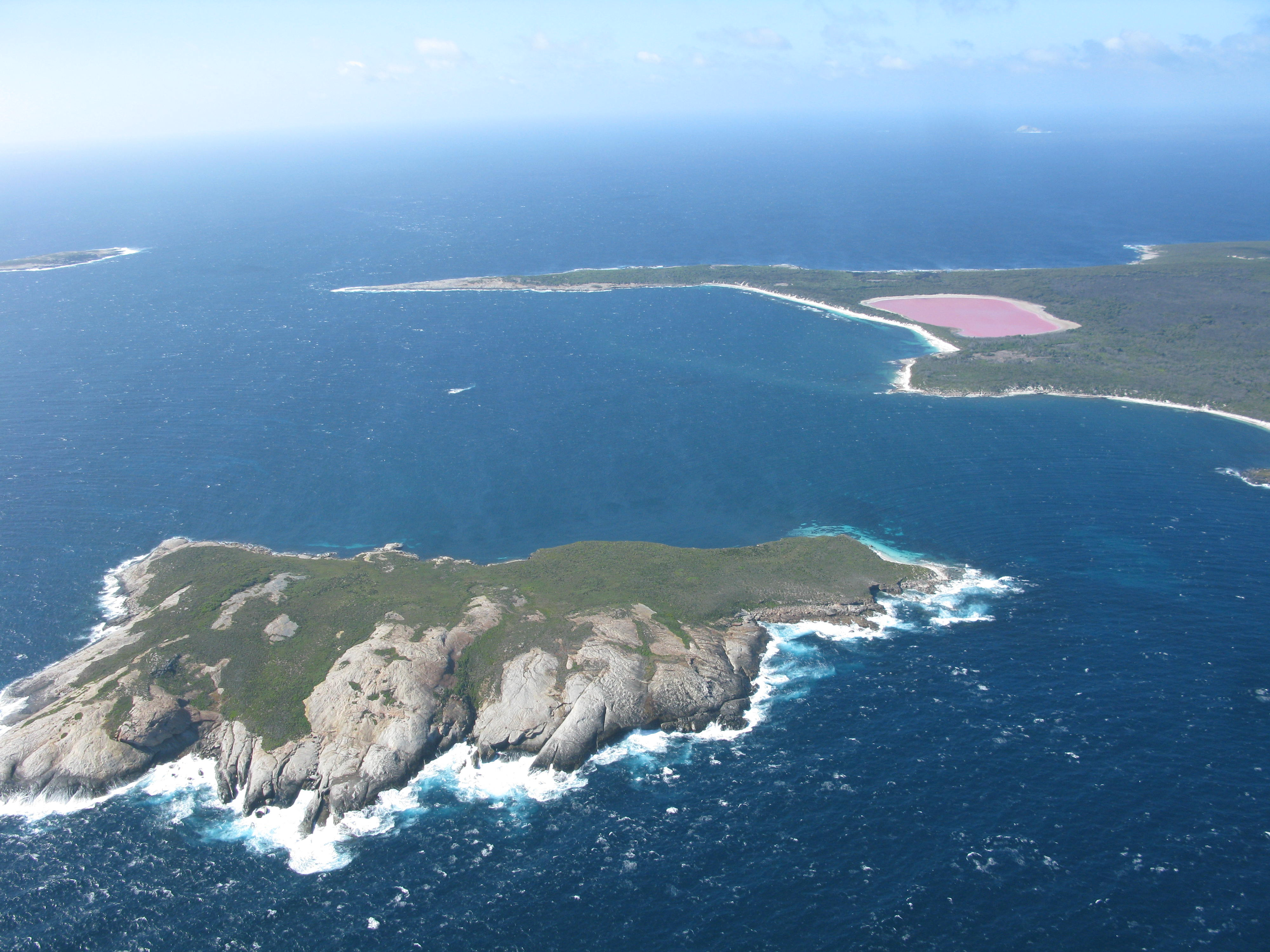
- Goose Island, Lake Hillier Middle Island and Miles Island (April 2011)

- Location within Western Australia
- Location: Western Australia
- Nearest city: Esperance
- Coordinates: 34°6′1.7994″S 123°11′16.0794″E
- Area: 71.45 km^{2} (27.59 sq mi)
- Established: 21 May 1948
- Visitors: "low" (in 2012)
- Governing body: Department of Parks and Wildlife

Recherche Archipelago Nature Reserve is a protected area located in the Recherche Archipelago off the south coast of Western Australia. It consists of at least 104 islands and at least 1,200 obstacles to shipping (reefs, islets and rocks) and covers an area of sea extending 230 kilometres (140 miles) from east to west and up to a distance of 50 kilometres (31 miles) from the coast of the Australian continent. As of 2012, visitor access is limited to Middle Island within the nature reserve and is only available via a licensed tour operator. The nature reserve is classified as an IUCN Category Ia protected area.

== See also ==
- List of protected areas of Western Australia
