= Dusty Rose Lake =

Lake in British Columbia, Canada

- Location within British Columbia
- Location: British Columbia, Canada
- Coordinates: 52°33′38″N 126°20′31″W
- Type: anoxic/fresh water
- Basin countries: Canada

Dusty Rose Lake is an anoxic lake located in north region of Tweedsmuir Park in British Columbia, Canada. It gets its name from its pink coloring.

The lake is unique among other lakes which have a similar coloring as it is not a salt water lake, but rather gets its coloring from pigmentation from the surrounding environment. The glacial meltwater feeding the lake gets its lavender hue from the particulate of the surrounding rock which is purple/pink in colour.

== Contents ==
The lake is completely devoid of any type of life, including micro-organisms because of the anoxic waters (water devoid of oxygen).

== Geography ==
The lake is located in a remote region of Tweedsmuir Park. There are no official walking trails that allow hikers to visit the lake.

== See also ==
- List of lakes of British Columbia
