= Lake Retba =

Pink-colored lake in Senegal

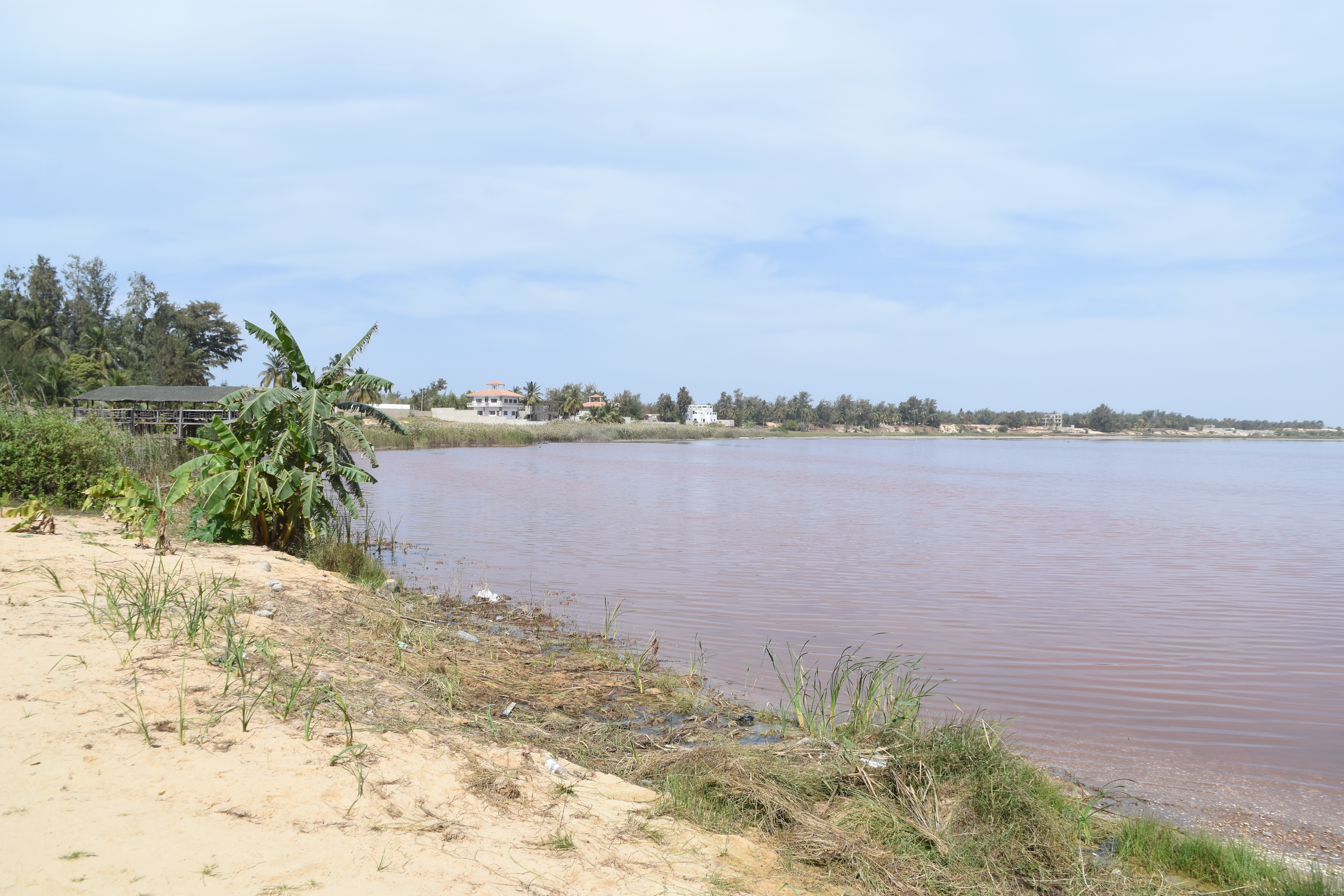
- Lake shore

- Location within Senegal
- Location: Cap Vert Peninsula
- Coordinates: 14°50′18.02″N 17°14′41.36″W
- Type: Hypersaline lake
- Basin countries: Senegal
- Surface area: 3 km^{2} (1.2 sq mi)
- Max. depth: 3 metres (9.8 ft)

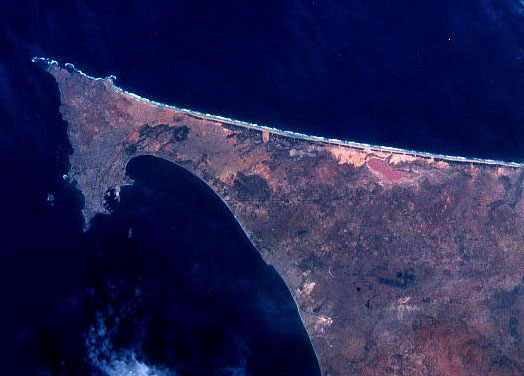
Cap Vert peninsula (NASA, 22 Nov. 2004)

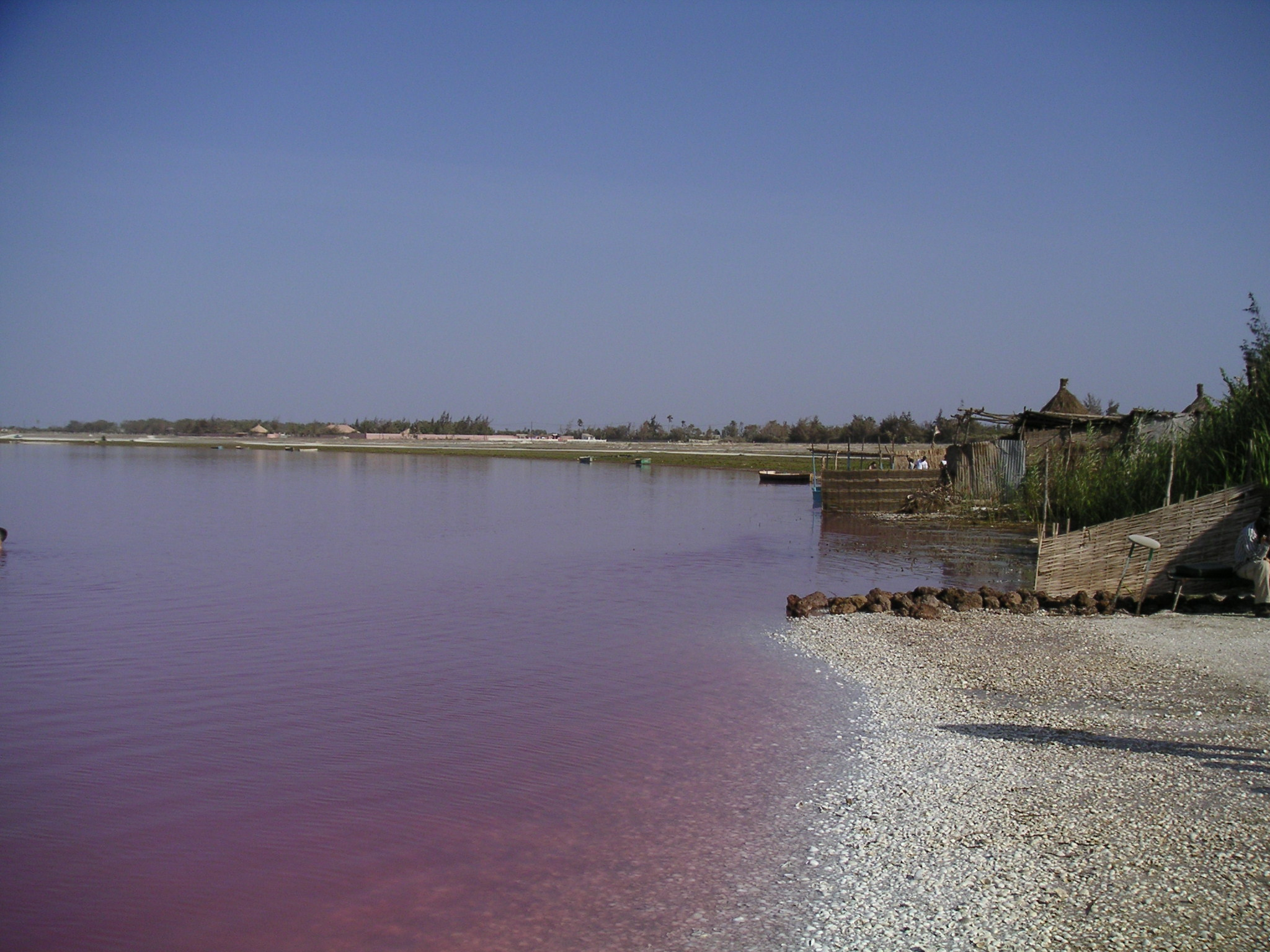
Lac Rose in Senegal

Lake Retba, also known as Lac Rose (meaning "pink lake"), lies north of the Cape Verde peninsula in Senegal, some 35 km (22 mi) north-east of the capital, Dakar. It is named for its pink waters caused by Dunaliella salina algae and is known for its high salt content, up to 40% in some areas. Its colour is usually particularly strong from late January to early March, during the dry season. Flooding in September 2022 not only disrupted salt harvesting activities on the lake, but also led the lake to lose its colour, causing a negative effect on tourism. However, as of 2025, the lake has regained some of its colour.

The lake is, as of May 2026, under consideration by UNESCO as a World Heritage Site.

== Description ==
The lake is situated 35 km (22 mi) north-east of Dakar, separated from the Atlantic Ocean only by a narrow corridor of dunes, and is named for its pink waters, which are caused by Dunaliella salina algae. The algae produce a red pigment to help them absorb sunlight, which gives them energy to create ATP, a nucleotide that is necessary to produce energy. The colour is particularly visible during the dry season (from November to May) and less visible during the rainy season (June to October).

== Salt ==
The lake is known for its high salt content (up to 40% in some areas), which is mainly due to the ingress of seawater and its subsequent evaporation. Like the Dead Sea, the lake is sufficiently buoyant that people can float easily.

Salt is exported across the region by up to 3,000 collectors, men and women from all over western Africa, who work 6–7 hours a day. They protect their skin with beurre de Karité (shea butter), an emollient produced from shea nuts which helps avoid tissue damage. The salt is used by Senegalese fishermen to preserve fish, which is an ingredient in many traditional recipes, including the national dish, which is a fish and rice combination called thieboudienne. About 38,000 tonnes of salt are harvested from this lake each year, which contributes to Senegal's salt production industry. Senegal is the number-one producer of salt in Africa.

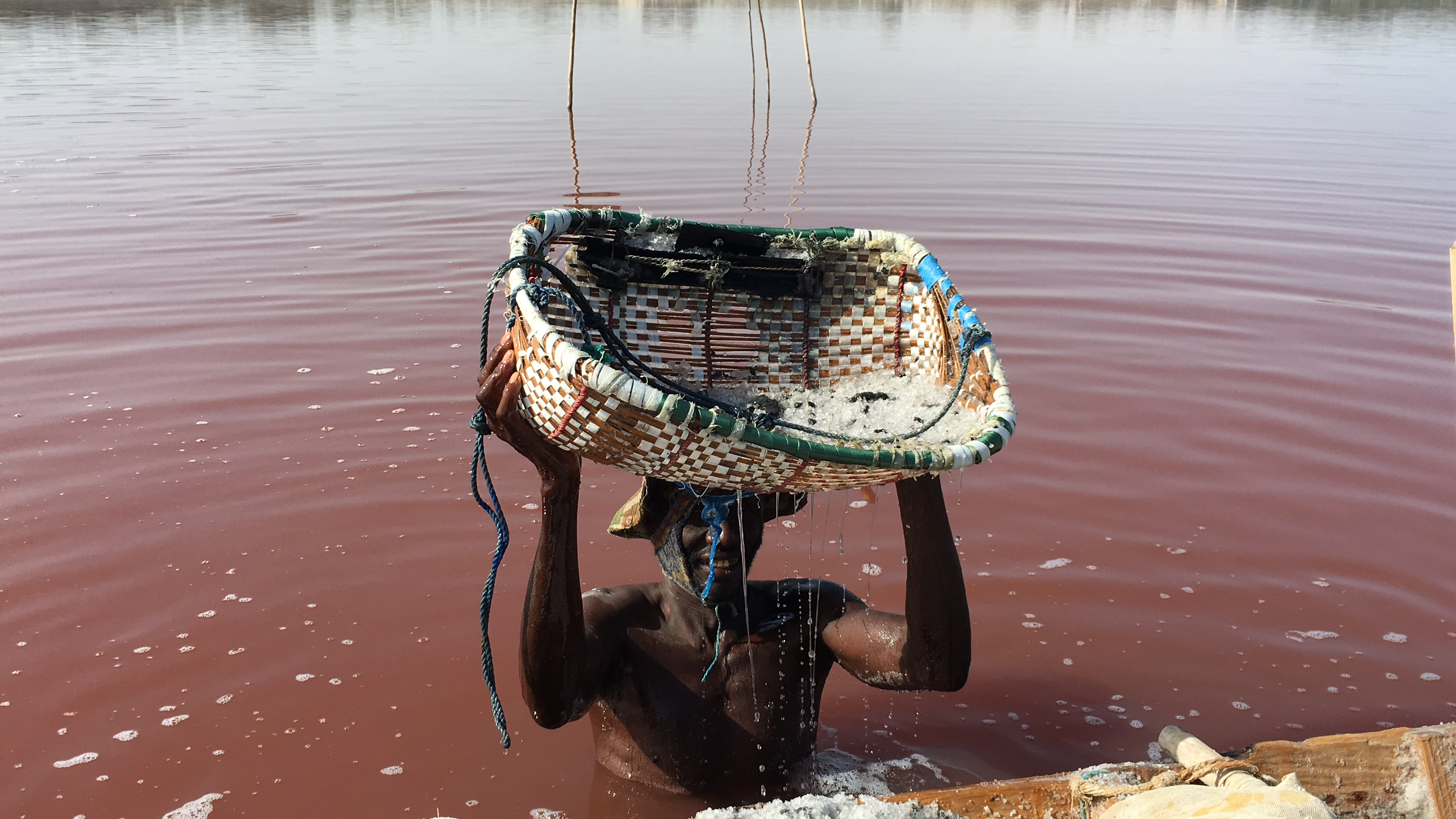
Worker harvesting salt from the lake

== Flooding ==
In 2022, severe flooding caused by torrential rains in Dakar devastated the lake. The floods breached its banks and contaminated its waters, turning its characteristic pink hue to green. This transformation threatens the ecosystem and economy of the area, impacting salt farmers, boatmen, souvenir vendors, and tourism. The flooding destroyed USD$696,000 worth of salt mounds, submerged businesses, and disrupted the lake's unique microbiome, jeopardizing future harvests and tourist visits. The lake has since partially regained its pink hue.

== Wildlife ==
Despite the high salinity of the lake, which can reach as high as 350 g/L during the dry season, blackchin tilapia have been found living in brackish sections fed fresh water by an intermittent creek.

== World heritage listing ==
Lake Retba has been under consideration by UNESCO as a World Heritage Site since October 2005, and remains so as of 2026.

== Motorsport ==
The lake was often the finishing point of the Dakar Rally, before the rally moved to South America in 2009.

In 2021, it hosted a round of the Extreme E electric off-road racing series.

== See also ==
- Pink lake
- Sir Michael Tippett, whose composition The Rose Lake was inspired by his visit to Lake Retba
