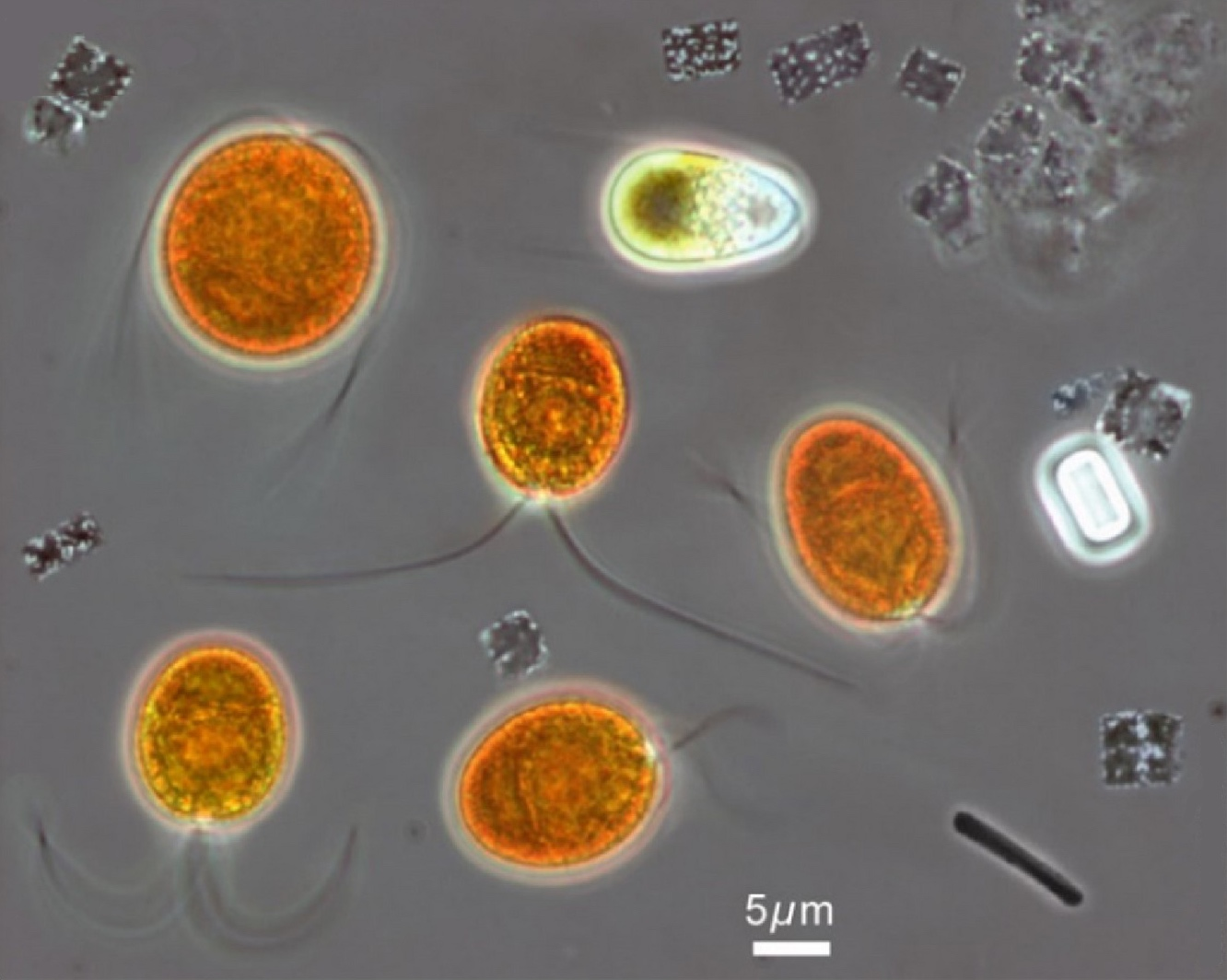
- Dunaliella salina in orange, tentatively identified from the hypersaline Lake Tyrrell, Victoria, Australia. Alongside are small haloarchaeons, Haloquadratum walsbyi, with their flat square-shaped cells.

Scientific classification
- Domain: Eukaryota
- Supergroup: Archaeplastida
- Clade: Viridiplantae
- Division: Chlorophyta
- Class: Chlorophyceae
- Order: Chlamydomonadales
- Family: Dunaliellaceae
- Genus: Dunaliella
- Species: D. salina

Binomial name
- Dunaliella salina (Dunal) Teodoresco

Synonyms
- Monas dunalii

= Dunaliella salina =

Species of alga

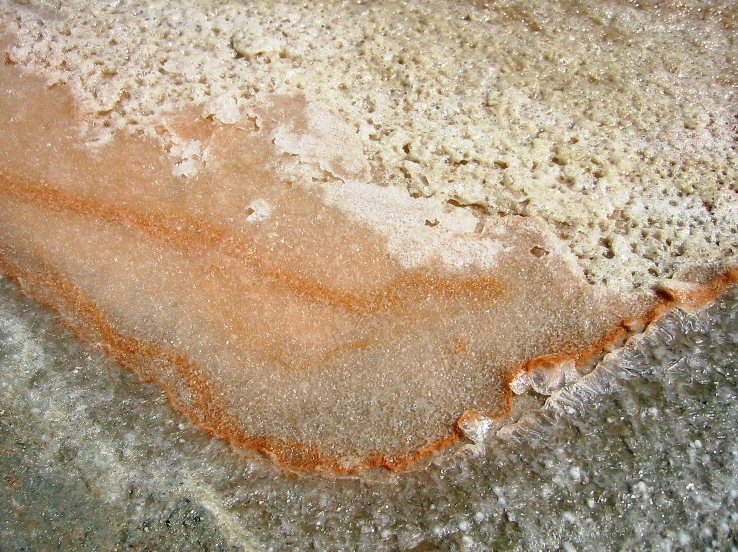
Orange-coloured Dunaliella salina within sea salt

Dunaliella salina is a species of halophilic, unicellular, green algae found especially in hypersaline environments, such as salt lakes and salt evaporation ponds. Known for its antioxidant activity because of its ability to create a large amount of carotenoids, it is responsible for most of the primary production in hypersaline environments worldwide and is also used in cosmetics and dietary supplements.

== History ==
Dunaliella salina was named by Emanoil C. Teodoresco of Bucharest, Romania, after its original discoverer, Michel Felix Dunal, who first scientifically reported sighting the organism in saltern evaporation ponds in Montpellier, France, in 1838. He initially named the organism Haematococcus salinus and Protococcus. The organism was fully described as a new, separate genus simultaneously by Teodoresco and Clara Hamburger of Heidelberg, Germany, in 1905. Teodoresco was the first to publish his work, so he is generally given credit for this combination.

== Habitat ==
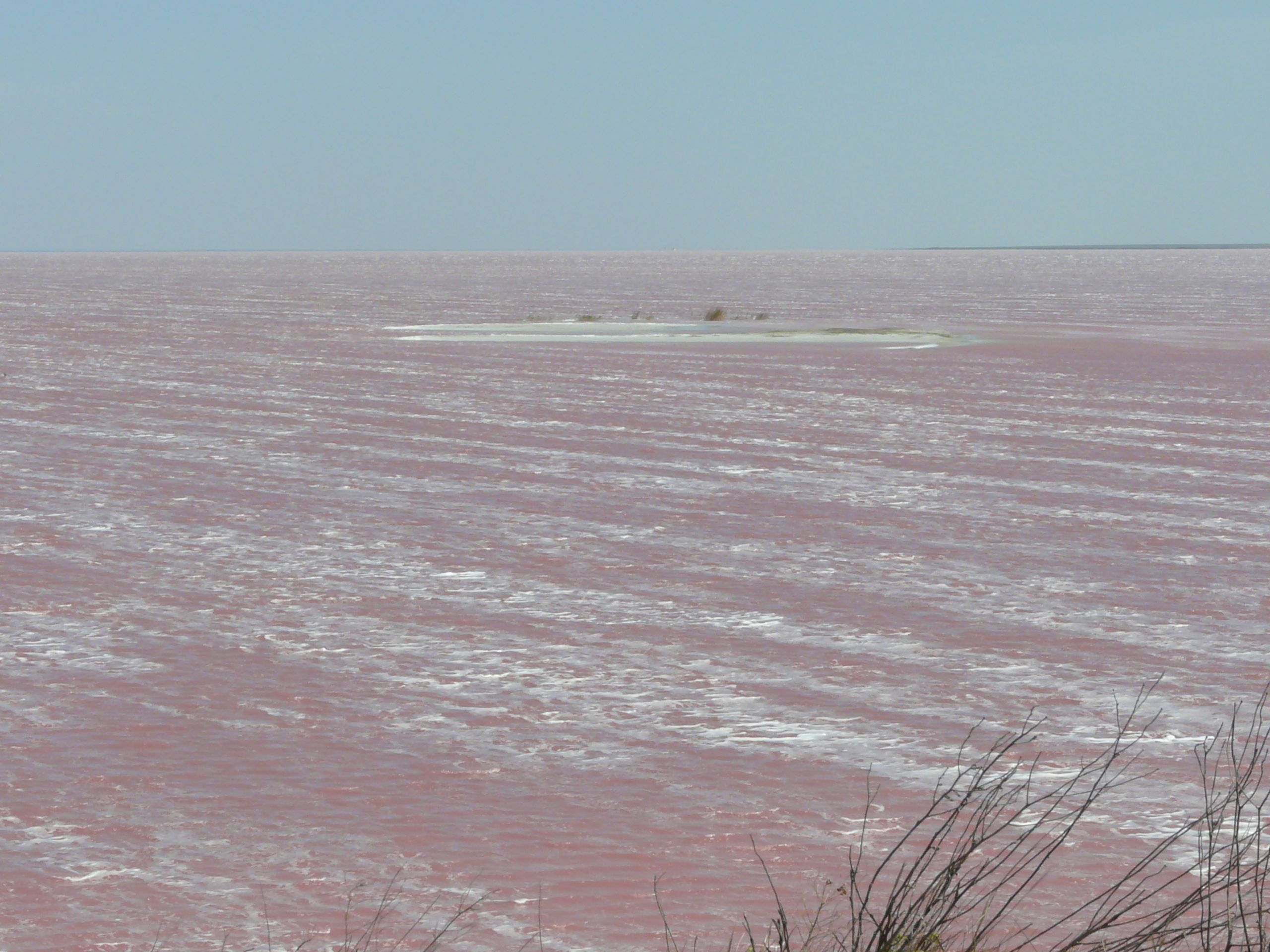
Dunaliella salina orange-coloured water of the salt lake Sivash, Crimea

Few organisms can survive as D. salina does in such highly saline conditions as salt evaporation ponds. To survive, these organisms have high concentrations of β-carotene, to protect against the intense light, and high concentrations of glycerol, to provide protection against osmotic pressure. This offers an opportunity for commercial biological production of these substances.

The colour of pink lakes was long thought to be the result of this alga, as it has been found in many pink lakes and contains substances in a range of hues that include pink. Research done in Australia since 2015 in Lake Hillier, though, found several species of halophilic bacteria and archaea, as well as several species of Dunaliella, nearly all of which contain some pink, red, or salmon-coloured pigment.

== Morphology and characteristics ==
Species in the genus Dunaliella are morphologically similar to Chlamydomonas reinhardtii, with the main exception being that Dunaliella species lack both a cell wall and a contractile vacuole. Dunaliella has two flagella of equal length and a single, cup-like chloroplast that often contains a central pyrenoid. The chloroplast can hold large amounts of β-carotene, which makes it appear orange-red. The β-carotene appears to protect the organism from long-term UV radiation to which D. salina is exposed in its typical environments. D. salina occurs in various shapes and symmetries depending on the conditions in its current environment.

D. salina lacks a rigid cell wall, which makes the organism susceptible to osmotic pressure. Glycerol is used as a means by which to maintain both osmotic balance and enzymatic activity. D. salina preserves a high concentration of glycerol by maintaining a cell membrane with low permeability to glycerol, and able to synthesise large quantities of glycerol from starch as a response to high extracellular salt concentration, which is why it tends to thrive in highly salinic environments.

== Reproduction and life cycle ==
D. salina can reproduce asexually through division of motile vegetative cells and sexually through the fusion of two equal gametes into a singular zygote. Though D. salina can survive in salinic environments, Martinez et al. determined that sexual activity of D. salina decreases significantly in higher salt concentrations (>10%) and is induced in lower salt concentrations. Sexual reproduction begins when two D. salina touch their flagella, leading to gamete fusion. The D. salina zygote is extraordinarily hardy and can survive exposure to fresh water and to dryness. After germination, the zygotes release up to 32 haploid daughter cells.

== Commercial uses ==
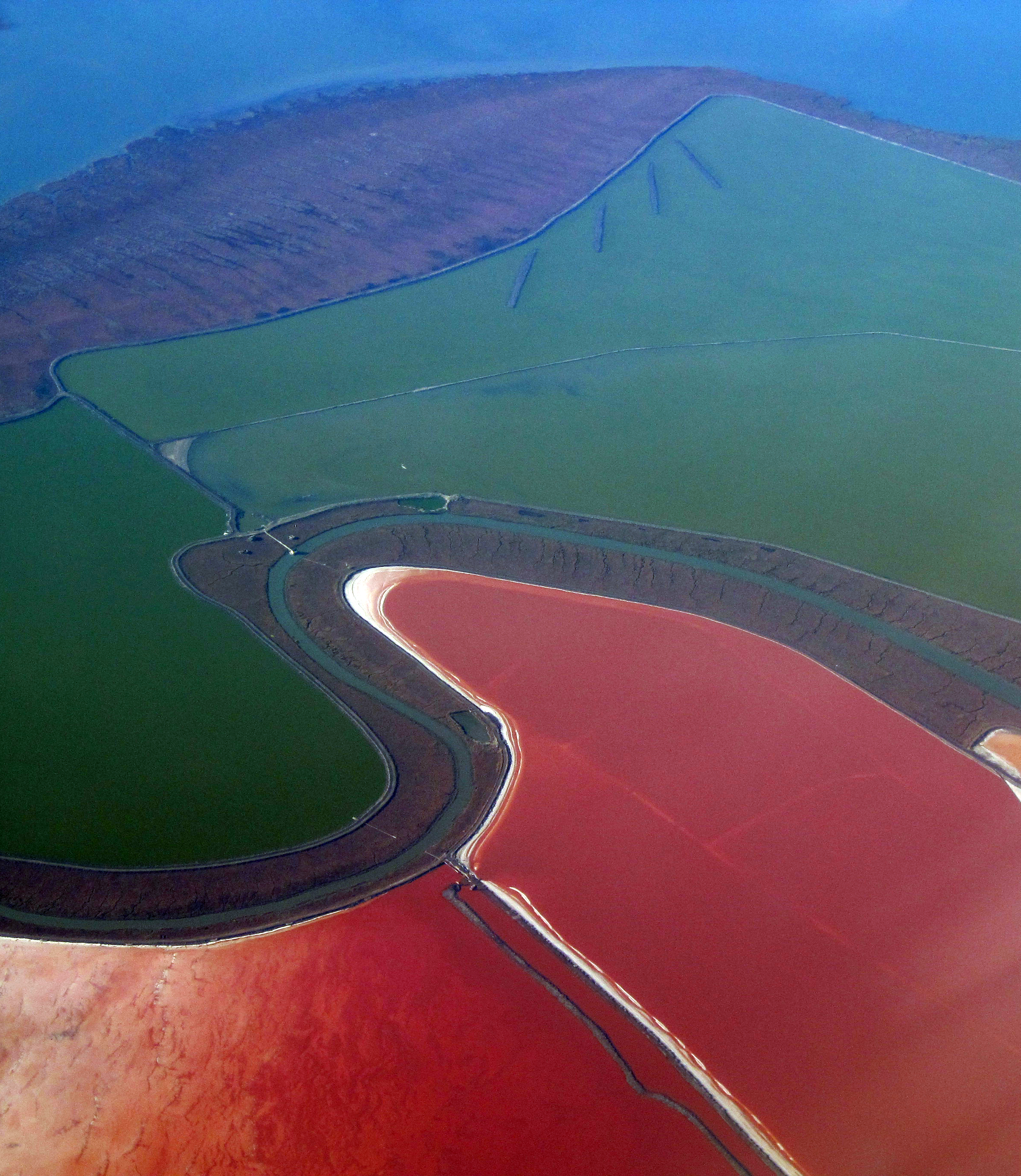
Salt ponds in San Francisco Bay

D. salina is responsible for most of the primary production in hypersaline environments worldwide.

=== β-carotene ===
From a first pilot plant established in the USSR in 1966, its commercial cultivation for the production of β-carotene throughout the world is now one of the success stories of halophile biotechnology. Different technologies are used, from low-tech extensive cultivation in lagoons to intensive cultivation at high cell densities under carefully controlled conditions.

=== Antioxidant and nutritional supplements ===
Due to the abundance of β-carotene, which is an antioxidant, as well as a vitamin A precursor, D. salina is a popular pro-vitamin A food supplement and cosmetic additive. D. salina may also be a source of vitamin B_{12}.

=== Glycerol ===
Attempts have been made to exploit the high concentrations of glycerol accumulated by D. salina as the basis for the commercial production of this compound. Although technically the production of glycerol from D. salina was shown to be possible, economic feasibility is low and no biotechnological operation exists to exploit the alga for glycerol production.

== See also ==
- Lake Retba, Senegal
- Seaweed
