= Middle Island (Western Australia) =

Island in Western Australia

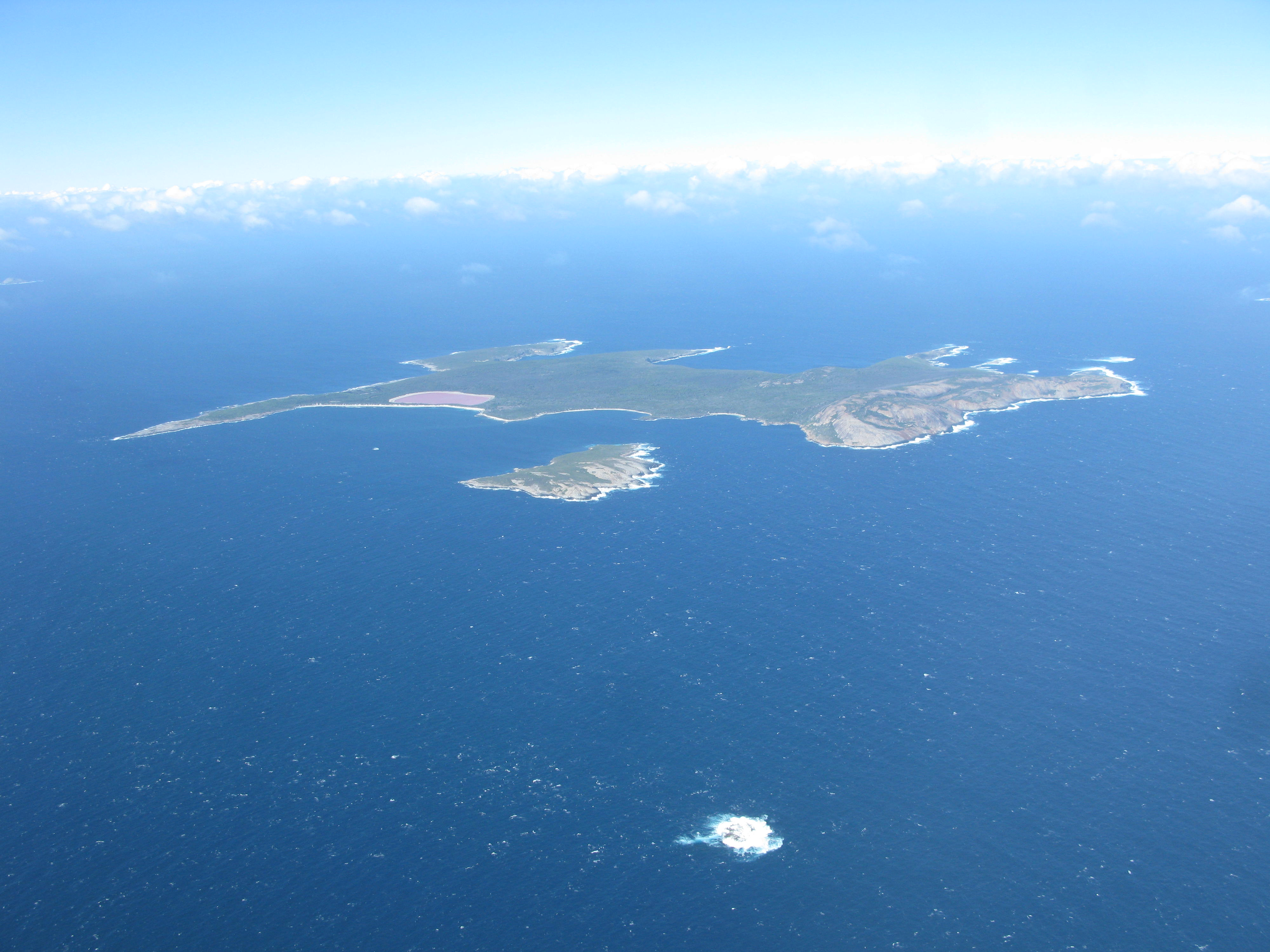
- Middle Island, Recherche Archipelago Nature Reserve, April 2011

- Location within Western Australia

Geography
- Location: Off the south coast of Western Australia
- Coordinates: 34.1001°S 123.1907°E
- Archipelago: Recherche Archipelago
- Area: 1,080 ha (2,700 acres)
- Length: 6.5 km (4.04 mi)
- Highest elevation: 174 m (571 ft)
- Highest point: Flinders Peak

Administration
- Australia

Middle Island (French: Île du Milieu) is an island off the south coast of Western Australia in the Recherche Archipelago, around 120 kilometres (75 mi) south-east of Esperance. It is known for its pink lake, Lake Hillier. Goose Island lies just adjacent to the north.

== History ==
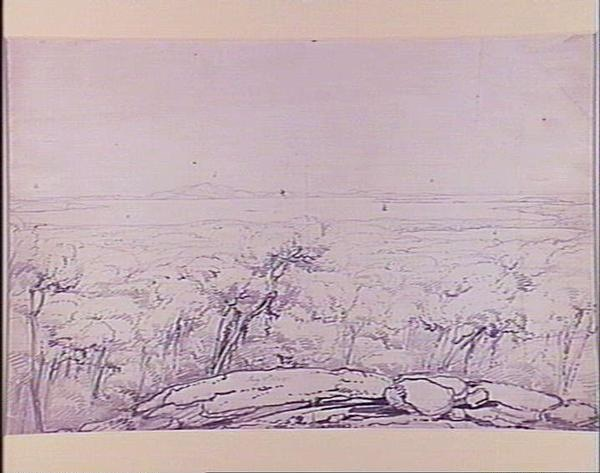
Sketch of view from Middle Island looking toward Cape Arid, from the Westall collection

The island was named by Antoine Bruni d'Entrecasteaux. Matthew Flinders, along with his botanist Robert Brown, visited in January 1802 and Flinders climbed the peak (subsequently named Flinders Peak) to survey the surrounding islands. John Thistle, Investigator master, collected some salt samples from the pink lake later known as Lake Hillier.

Sealers operated from the island throughout the 19th century.

The explorer Philip Parker King anchored off the island in 1818, and lost two anchors (which were later recovered in 1973).

Belinda was wrecked off Middle Island in 1824. In 1826 eight Englishmen who had been marooned on Middle Island by the captain of sealing vessel Governor Brisbane were found by the French explorer Dumont d’Urville aboard Astrolabe.

Apocryphal accounts claim that the pirate Black Jack Anderson based himself on Middle Island – some time after 1826, when Anderson had arrived at the first British outpost in Western Australia, at King George Sound (later Albany). After being accused of murder, Anderson and a group of men reputedly fled to the islands, where they hunted seals for their skins, and plotted raids on ships travelling to and from the Australian colonies.

Bay whaling may have been carried out, from bases on the island, as early as the 1840s. By the 1870s, there was documented use of the island for such purposes.

Mary-Jane was wrecked off the island in 1875.

In 1889, Edward Andrews investigated the commercial possibilities of producing salt from Lake Hillier; Andrews briefly moved onto the island with both of his sons. They left after working the salt deposits for about a year.

Rodondo was wrecked off the island in 1894 and Eclipse met a similar fate in 1898. SS Penguin was wrecked off the island while sheltering from a gale in 1920.

== Location and geographic features ==
The island lies around 120 kilometres (75 mi) south-east of Esperance.

The island is 6.5 kilometres (4 mi) long, has an area of 1,080 hectares (2,669 acres), and is approximately 9 kilometres (6 mi) off shore from Cape Arid. The island is the largest in the Recherche Archipelago. Goose Island is just off the north coast of Middle Island.

Flinders Peak, at 174 metres (571 ft) high, dominates the island, and has a cairn at the summit. There is a track marked with surveyors' tape.

The island is known for its pink lake, Lake Hillier, a shallow salt lake which is about 1 kilometre (0.6 mi) in width. Tourists take scenic flights over the island to see the lake.

There are dunes along the coast, and many swimming beaches along the north coast.

== Wildlife ==
The island supports a population of the tammar wallaby and the bush rat. One species of snake, the crowned snake, has been recorded, along with 31 species of birds.

A small population of the critically endangered Gilbert's potoroo is being established as an "insurance population" on the island as of 2022, funded by the state government and with Indigenous rangers of the Esperance Tjaltjraak Native Title Aboriginal Corporation helping to monitor numbers. The island was chosen for its remote location, size, lack of predators, and the potoroos' food source, several species of underground fungi.

Goose Island is a breeding ground for mutton birds, with prolific burrows covering the ground. There are also black rabbits and some crowned snakes here.

== Historical features ==
Evidence of former European settlement of the island is still visible. There are several granite fireplaces, one with a baker's oven; an old fishing hut; and relics of horse-drawn rail wagons and old rails. The latter were most likely used transport salt from the lake to the beach. There is also a deep well.

The wreck of SS Penguin is visible from the shore off the north coast.

== See also ==
- List of islands of Western Australia
- List of islands of Australia
- HMS Investigator Anchors
