= Rhodothermales =

Scientific classification
- Domain: Bacteria
- Kingdom: Pseudomonadati
- Phylum: Rhodothermota; Munoz et al. 2021
- Class: Rhodothermia; Munoz et al. 2017
- Order: Rhodothermales; Munoz et al. 2017

Families
- Rhodothermaceae; Rubricoccaceae; Salinibacteraceae

Synonyms
- Rhodothermota: "Rhodothermota" García-López et al. 2019; "Rhodothermaeota" Munoz et al. 2016; Rhodothermales: "Rhodothermales" Munoz et al. 2016

Order of bacteria

The Rhodothermales are an order of bacteria.

== Phylogeny ==
The currently accepted taxonomy is based on the List of Prokaryotic names with Standing in Nomenclature (LPSN) and National Center for Biotechnology Information (NCBI).

16S rRNA based LTP_10_2024

- - Rhodothermaceae
  - - - Roseithermus
      - Rubricoccaceae
    - - Rhodocaloribacter
      - Salinibacteraceae (incl. Salisaetaceae)

120 marker proteins based GTDB 10-RS226

- - Rubricoccaceae Munoz et al. 2016
  - - Rhodothermaceae Ludwig et al. 2012
    - - - Rhodocaloribacter Björnsdóttir et al. 2021 {ISCAR-4553}
        - Roseithermus Park et al. 2019 {MEBIC09517}
      - Salinibacteraceae Munoz et al. 2016 (incl. Salisaetaceae Park et al. 2019)

== See also ==
- List of bacterial orders
- List of bacteria genera
