= Halophile =

Organisms that live in high salt concentrations

A halophile (from the Greek word for 'salt-loving') is an extremophile that thrives in high salt concentrations. In chemical terms, halophile refers to a Lewis acidic species that has some ability to extract halides from other chemical species.

While most halophiles are classified into the domain Archaea, there are also bacterial halophiles and some eukaryotic species, such as the alga Dunaliella salina and fungus Wallemia ichthyophaga. Some well-known species give off a red color from carotenoid compounds, notably bacteriorhodopsin.

Halophiles can be found in water bodies with salt concentration more than five times greater than that of the ocean, such as the Great Salt Lake in Utah, Owens Lake in California, the Lake Urmia in Iran, the Dead Sea, and in evaporation ponds. They are theorized to be a possible analogues for modeling extremophiles that might live in the salty subsurface water ocean of Jupiter's Europa and similar moons.

== Classification ==
Halophiles are categorized by the extent of their halotolerance: slight, moderate, or extreme. Slight halophiles prefer 0.3 to 0.8 M (1.7 to 4.8%—seawater is 0.6 M or 3.5%), moderate halophiles 0.8 to 3.4 M (4.7 to 20%), and extreme halophiles 3.4 to 5.1 M (20 to 30%) salt content. Halophiles require sodium chloride (salt) for growth, in contrast to halotolerant organisms, which do not require salt but can grow under saline conditions.

== Lifestyle ==
High salinity represents an extreme environment in which relatively few organisms have been able to adapt and survive. Most halophilic and all halotolerant organisms expend energy to exclude salt from their cytoplasm to avoid protein aggregation ('salting out'). To survive the high salinities, halophiles employ two differing strategies to prevent desiccation through osmotic movement of water out of their cytoplasm. Both strategies work by increasing the internal osmolarity of the cell. The first strategy is employed by some archaea, the majority of halophilic bacteria, yeasts, algae, and fungi; the organism accumulates organic compounds in the cytoplasm—osmoprotectants which are known as compatible solutes. These can be either synthesised or accumulated from the environment. The most common compatible solutes are neutral or zwitterionic, and include amino acids, sugars, polyols, betaines, and ectoines, as well as derivatives of some of these compounds.

The second, more radical adaptation involves selectively absorbing potassium (K^{+}) ions into the cytoplasm. This adaptation is restricted to the extremely halophilic archaeal family Halobacteriaceae, the moderately halophilic bacterial order Halanaerobiales, and the extremely halophilic bacterium Salinibacter ruber. The presence of this adaptation in three distinct evolutionary lineages suggests convergent evolution of this strategy, it being unlikely to be an ancient characteristic retained in only scattered groups or passed on through massive lateral gene transfer. The primary reason for this is the entire intracellular machinery (enzymes, structural proteins, etc.) must be adapted to high salt levels, whereas in the compatible solute adaptation, little or no adjustment is required to intracellular macromolecules; in fact, the compatible solutes often act as more general stress protectants, as well as just osmoprotectants.

Of particular note are the extreme halophiles or haloarchaea (often known as halobacteria), a group of archaea, which require at least a 2 M salt concentration and are usually found in saturated solutions (about 36% w/v salts). These are the primary inhabitants of salt lakes, inland seas, and evaporating ponds of seawater, such as the deep salterns, where they tint the water column and sediments bright colors. These species most likely perish if they are exposed to anything other than a very high-concentration, salt-conditioned environment. These prokaryotes require salt for growth. The high concentration of sodium chloride in their environment limits the availability of oxygen for respiration. Their cellular machinery is adapted to high salt concentrations by having charged amino acids on their surfaces, allowing the retention of water molecules around these components. They are heterotrophs that normally respire by aerobic means. Most halophiles are unable to survive outside their high-salt native environments. Many halophiles are so fragile that when they are placed in distilled water, they immediately lyse from the change in osmotic conditions.

Halophiles use a variety of energy sources and can be aerobic or anaerobic; anaerobic halophiles include phototrophic, fermentative, sulfate-reducing, homoacetogenic, and methanogenic species.

The Haloarchaea, and particularly the family Halobacteriaceae, are members of the domain Archaea, and comprise the majority of the prokaryotic population in hypersaline environments. Currently, 15 recognised genera are in the family. The domain Bacteria (mainly Salinibacter ruber) can comprise up to 25% of the prokaryotic community, but is more commonly a much lower percentage of the overall population. At times, the alga Dunaliella salina can also proliferate in this environment.

A comparatively wide range of taxa has been isolated from saltern crystalliser ponds, including members of these genera: Haloferax, Halogeometricum, Halococcus, Haloterrigena, Halorubrum, Haloarcula, and Halobacterium. However, the viable counts in these cultivation studies have been small when compared to total counts, and the numerical significance of these isolates has been unclear. Only recently has it become possible to determine the identities and relative abundances of organisms in natural populations, typically using PCR-based strategies that target 16S small subunit ribosomal ribonucleic acid (16S rRNA) genes. While comparatively few studies of this type have been performed, results from these suggest that some of the most readily isolated and studied genera may not in fact be significant in the in situ community. This is seen in cases such as the genus Haloarcula, which is estimated to make up less than 0.1% of the in situ community, but commonly appears in isolation studies.

== Genomic and proteomic signature ==
The comparative genomic and proteomic analysis showed distinct molecular signatures exist for the environmental adaptation of halophiles. At the protein level, the halophilic species are characterized by low hydrophobicity, an overrepresentation of acidic residues, underrepresentation of Cys, lower propensities for helix formation, and higher propensities for coil structure. The core of these proteins is less hydrophobic, such as DHFR, that was found to have narrower β-strands. In one study, the net charges (at pH 7.4) of the ribosomal proteins (r-proteins) that comprise the S10-spc cluster were observed to have an inverse relationship with the halophilicity/halotolerance levels in both bacteria and archaea. At the DNA level, the halophiles exhibit distinct dinucleotide and codon usage.

== Examples ==
Halobacteriaceae is a family that includes a large part of halophilic archaea. The genus Halobacterium under it has a high tolerance for elevated levels of salinity. Some species of halobacteria have acidic proteins that resist the denaturing effects of salts. Halococcus is another genus of the family Halobacteriaceae.

Some hypersaline lakes are habitat to numerous families of halophiles. For example, the Makgadikgadi Pans in Botswana form a vast, seasonal, high-salinity water body that manifests halophilic species within the diatom genus Nitzschia in the family Bacillariaceae, as well as species within the genus Lovenula in the family Diaptomidae. Owens Lake in California also contains a large population of the halophilic bacterium Halobacterium halobium.

Wallemia ichthyophaga is a basidiomycetous fungus, which requires at least 1.5 M sodium chloride for in vitro growth, and it thrives even in media saturated with salt. Obligate requirement for salt is an exception in fungi. Even species that can tolerate salt concentrations close to saturation (for example Hortaea werneckii) in almost all cases grow well in standard microbiological media without the addition of salt.

The fermentation of salty foods (such as soy sauce, Chinese fermented beans, salted cod, salted anchovies, sauerkraut, etc.) often involves halophiles as either essential ingredients or accidental contaminants. One example is Chromohalobacter beijerinckii, found in salted beans preserved in brine and in salted herring. Tetragenococcus halophilus is found in salted anchovies and soy sauce.

Artemia is a ubiquitous genus of small halophilic crustaceans living in salt lakes (such as Great Salt Lake) and solar salterns that can exist in water approaching the precipitation point of NaCl (340 g/L) and can withstand strong osmotic shocks due to its mitigating strategies for fluctuating salinity levels, such as its unique larval salt gland and osmoregulatory capacity.

== See also ==
- Arid Forest Research Institute
- Biosalinity
- Halotolerance
