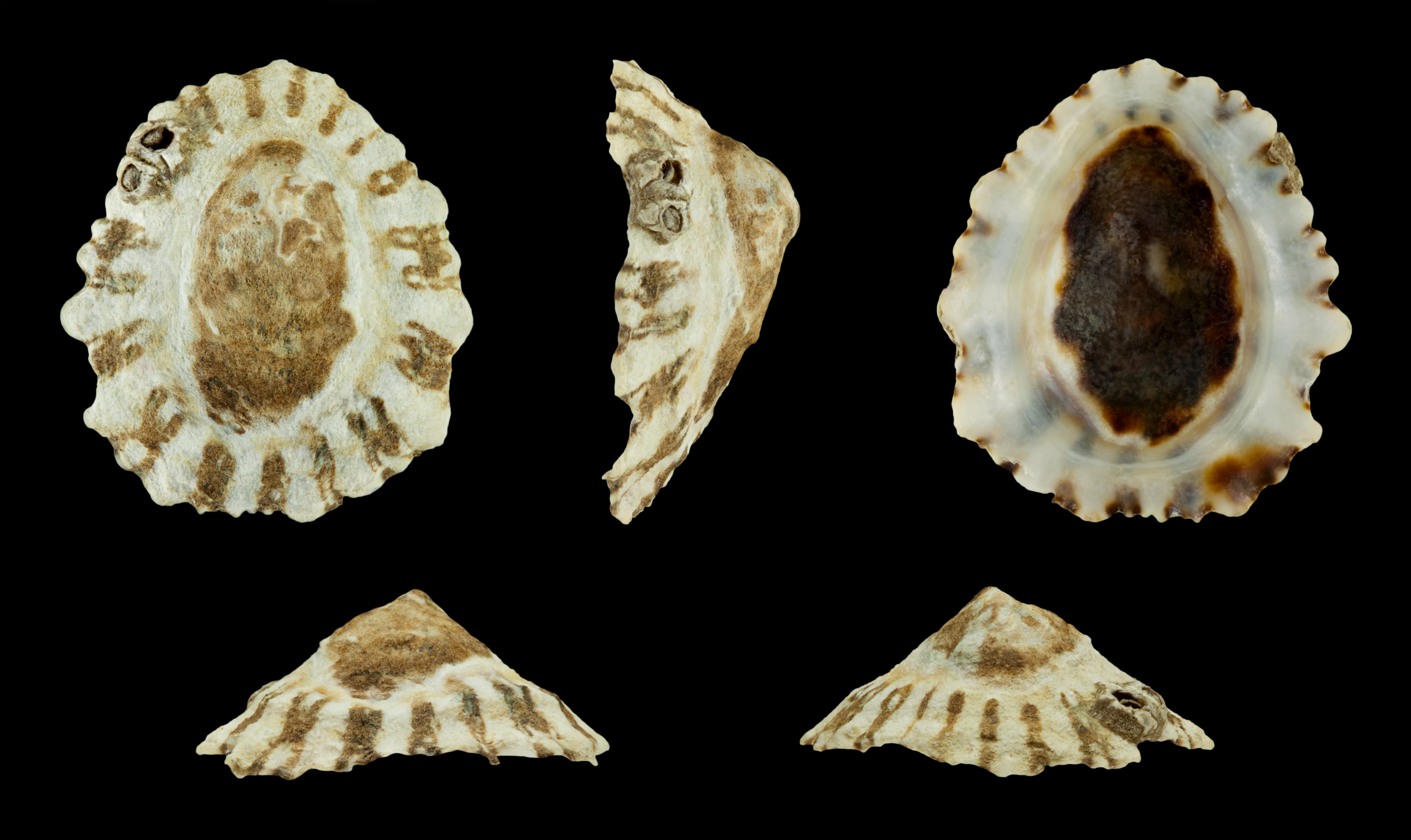
- A shell of Lottia scabra

Scientific classification
- Kingdom: Animalia
- Phylum: Mollusca
- Class: Gastropoda
- Subclass: Patellogastropoda
- Family: Lottiidae
- Genus: Lottia
- Species: L. scabra

Binomial name
- Lottia scabra (Gould, 1846)

Synonyms
- Acmaea scabra; Acmaea spectrum Reeve; Collisella scabra (Gould, 1846); Collisella spectrum Dall, 1891; Macclintockia scabra (Gould, 1846)

= Lottia scabra =

Species of gastropod

Lottia scabra or the rough limpet is a species of sea snail, a true limpet, a marine gastropod mollusk in the family Lottiidae.

== Description ==
L. scabra grows to a length of about thirty-five millimetres and has conspicuous rugged radial ribs with darker-coloured interspaces and a boldly scalloped margin. The apex is a quarter of the way across the shell and the anterior slope is neither concave nor convex. The shell is a mottled grey and tan colour and the head and the side of foot are white with black spots.

The shell size is between 19 and 40 mm and the shell is rather depressed. The apex of the shell has a small depression, a very elongated outline and is located at the anterior third of the shell. In some specimens the apex is nearly central, with a rounded shell.

The axial sculpture shows very strong, close, rough ribs with smaller intervening riblets in the interstices. The shell of a young snail is extremely inequilateral and develops rapidly the characteristic ribs.

The shell has a white color with fine brown lines between the main ribs. These brown lines dot the otherwise uniform white margin. The principal ribs are sometimes rather sharp, palmating the margin. Occasionally they are small and crowded, becoming faint at the margin.

The interior of the shell is white with darker spots and bars. It shows a white callus, through which the darker spots appear. These take occasionally the form of irregular ghostly bars (which gave rise to its synonymous name Acmaea spectrum - spectrum = ghost).

The very strong ribs at the outside and the curiously marked interior, like the print of a hand, are prominent characteristics of this species.

== Distribution and habitat ==
L. scabra is found on the Pacific coast of North America from Cape Arago, Oregon to southern Baja California. It is abundant in the higher littoral zone on horizontal rock surfaces on both exposed and protected coastlines. It homes at low tide to a specific site where the contours of its shell match the rock surface. It is sometimes found living on Lottia gigantea.

== Biology ==
L. scabra lives on the shoreline often above high water mark in the splash zone. When the rock is wet it moves about and uses its radula to rasp microscopic algae and diatoms off the rock surface. Over time, using the scalloped edge of its shell, it grinds a groove in a rock until the shell makes a perfect fit. This enables it to remain alive under conditions that would otherwise cause desiccation.

== Behaviour ==
At Mission Point on the California coast, L. scabra coexists with the similar species, Lottia digitalis, but each occupies a slightly different habitat. L. digitalis tends to occupy vertical rock faces or overhangs and certain horizontal ones clothed by algae and barnacles. L. digitalis clump together more often, prefer wave-exposed areas, occupy sites further up the shore and are seldom found in rock pools. Both species move about freely when the tide is up but L. digitalis settles in a different location at each low tide whereas L. scabra tends to home to the same spot. L. scabra has a more rugged outline and grows to fit the rock surface of its home base. The differences in micro-habitat may be explained by its greater tolerance of exposure to desiccation during low tides in less protected sites because it is able to retain water better. If transplanted to unfamiliar territory, each species soon reselects its typical base habitat.

In an experiment, when these two species were caged together with only vertical surfaces available, it was found that L. scabra grew at a much slower rate and achieved a much smaller maximum size than similar limpets in control plots. It seems that the ability of L. digitalis to respond to seasonal changes by moving up and down the shore and utilising resources better give it an edge over the more static species which remains for life in its restricted home range. L. scabra is less able to compete under optimal conditions and is therefore restricted to horizontal, more-desiccating habitats.

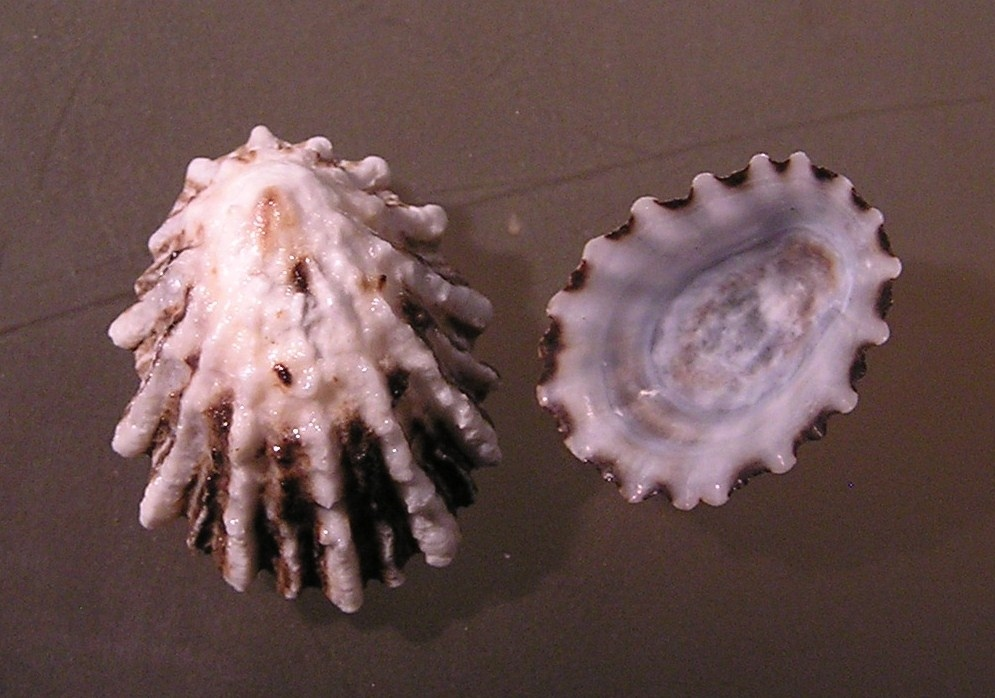
Apical and basal view

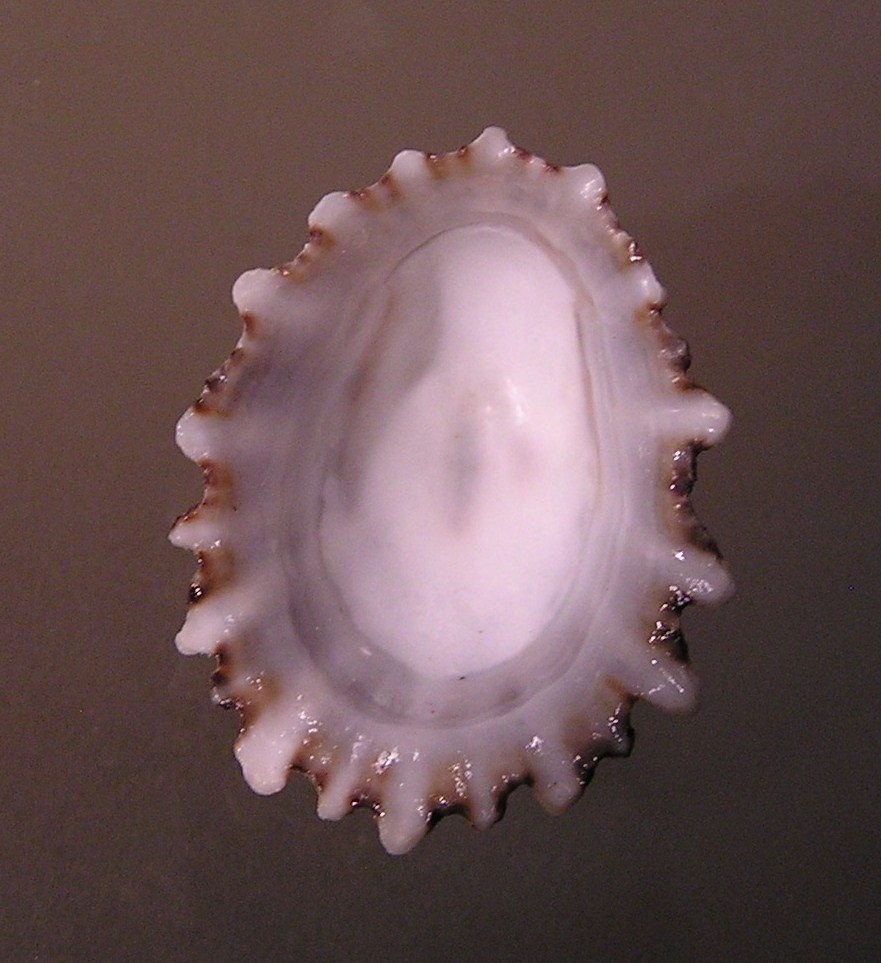
Basal view

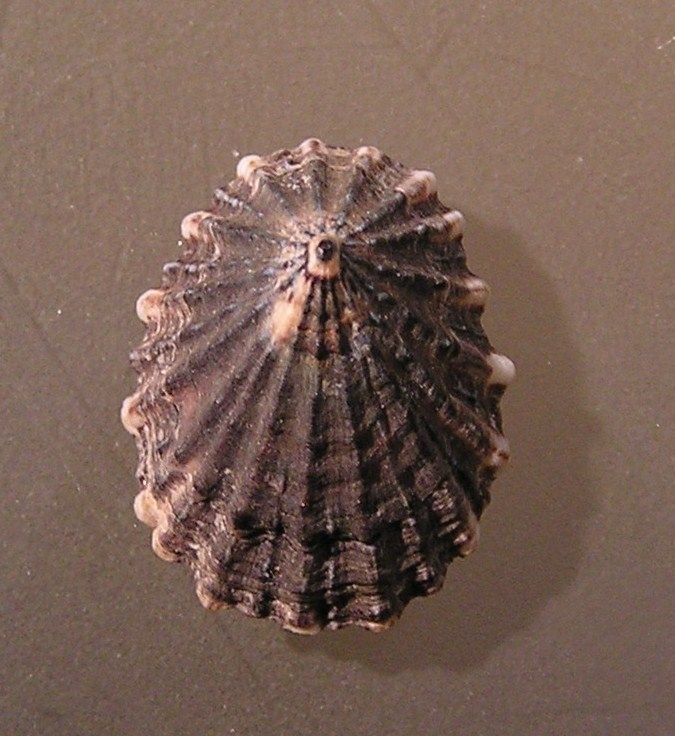
Lottia scabra
