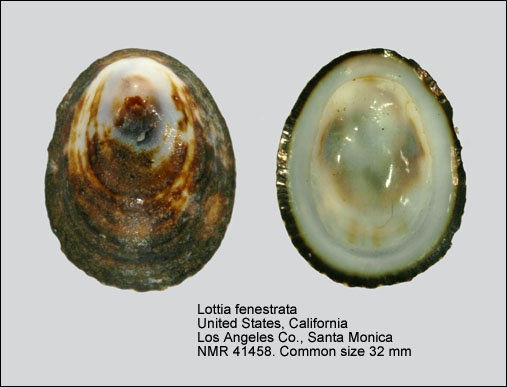

Scientific classification
- Kingdom: Animalia
- Phylum: Mollusca
- Class: Gastropoda
- Subclass: Patellogastropoda
- Family: Lottiidae
- Genus: Lottia
- Species: L. fenestrata

Binomial name
- Lottia fenestrata (Reeve, 1855)

= Lottia fenestrata =

Species of gastropod

Lottia fenestrata is a species of sea snail, a true limpet, a marine gastropod mollusk in the family Lottiidae, one of the families of true limpets.

== Description ==
The shell can grow to be 20 mm to 38 mm in length.
