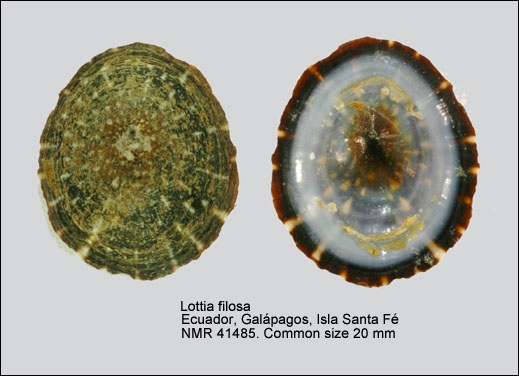

Scientific classification
- Kingdom: Animalia
- Phylum: Mollusca
- Class: Gastropoda
- Subclass: Patellogastropoda
- Family: Lottiidae
- Genus: Lottia
- Species: L. filosa

Binomial name
- Lottia filosa (Carpenter, 1865)

= Lottia filosa =

Species of gastropod

Lottia filosa is a species of sea snail, a true limpet, a marine gastropod mollusk in the family Lottiidae, one of the families of true limpets. The Habitat of this creature tends towards Marine Benthic and is in the trophic guild grazers.

== Description ==
The shell can grow to be 20 mm in length. The body symmetry of the shell is bilaterally symmetric and moves by Mucus Mediated Gliding.

== Distribution ==
It can be found off of Mexico to Colombia and off of the Galapagos Islands.
