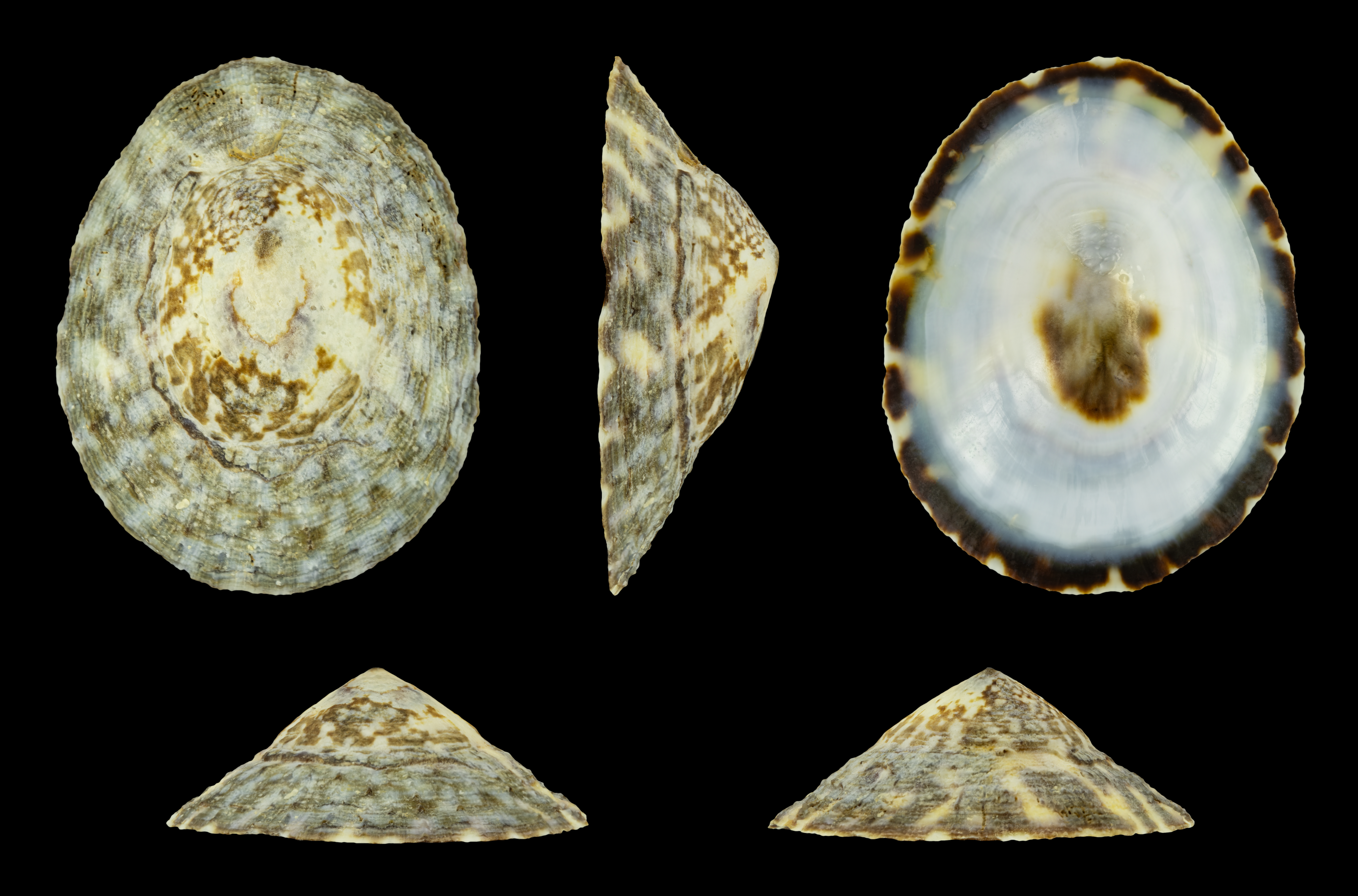

Scientific classification
- Kingdom: Animalia
- Phylum: Mollusca
- Class: Gastropoda
- Subclass: Patellogastropoda
- Family: Lottiidae
- Genus: Lottia
- Species: L. limatula

Binomial name
- Lottia limatula (Carpenter, 1864)

Synonyms
- Acmaea limatula Casey, 1907; Patella limatula P. P. Carpenter, 1864

= Lottia limatula =

Species of mollusc

Lottia limatula, the file limpet, is a species of true limpet, a marine gastropod mollusk in the family Lottiidae. This species lives in the Pacific coasts of North America where they can be found most concentrated around the state of California, spreading south to Baja California Sur and north to Alaska as well. These limpets inhabit intertidal zones along coastlines and can be found grazing on encrusting algaes during high tide or in a sessile state sealing themselves to rock when exposed out of water. Predation from other intertidal animals in this environment include shore crabs such as the striped shore crab or sea stars such as the ochre sea star. This species is also known to avoid sea stars that are nearby their presence. This species typically reproduces in winter months with broadcast spawning between males and females. Female eggs are olive-green and coloration. Spawning months occur and peak during January, February, April, and October.

== Description ==
L. limatula individuals can have shells that reach lengths of up to 45 millimeters, with the shells having a flattened low profile and round shape. The apex is located near the front third of the shell. The dorsal part of the shell has small radiating ribs with fine scaling that gives the shell a rough texturing. Margins of the shell are fine and serrated. Colors and patterning of the dorsal shell can be highly varied between individuals. Colors include yellows, greens, browns, and whites, where patterning can come mottled or checkered with white spots. The underside of the shell is white with a margin and center of brown. The side of the foot and the head is black in coloration, which is unique for this species as it is a pattern unseen in other local limpet species.

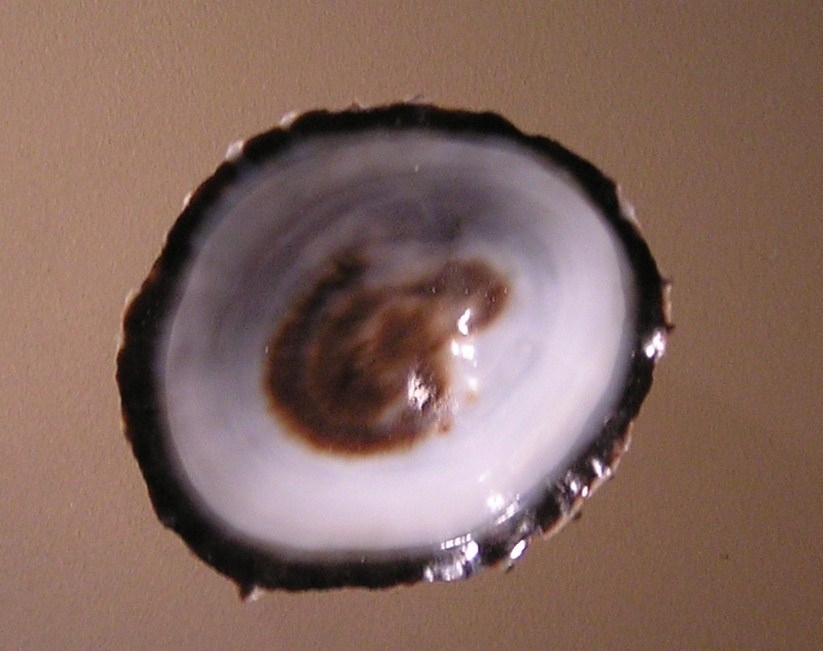
Basal view
