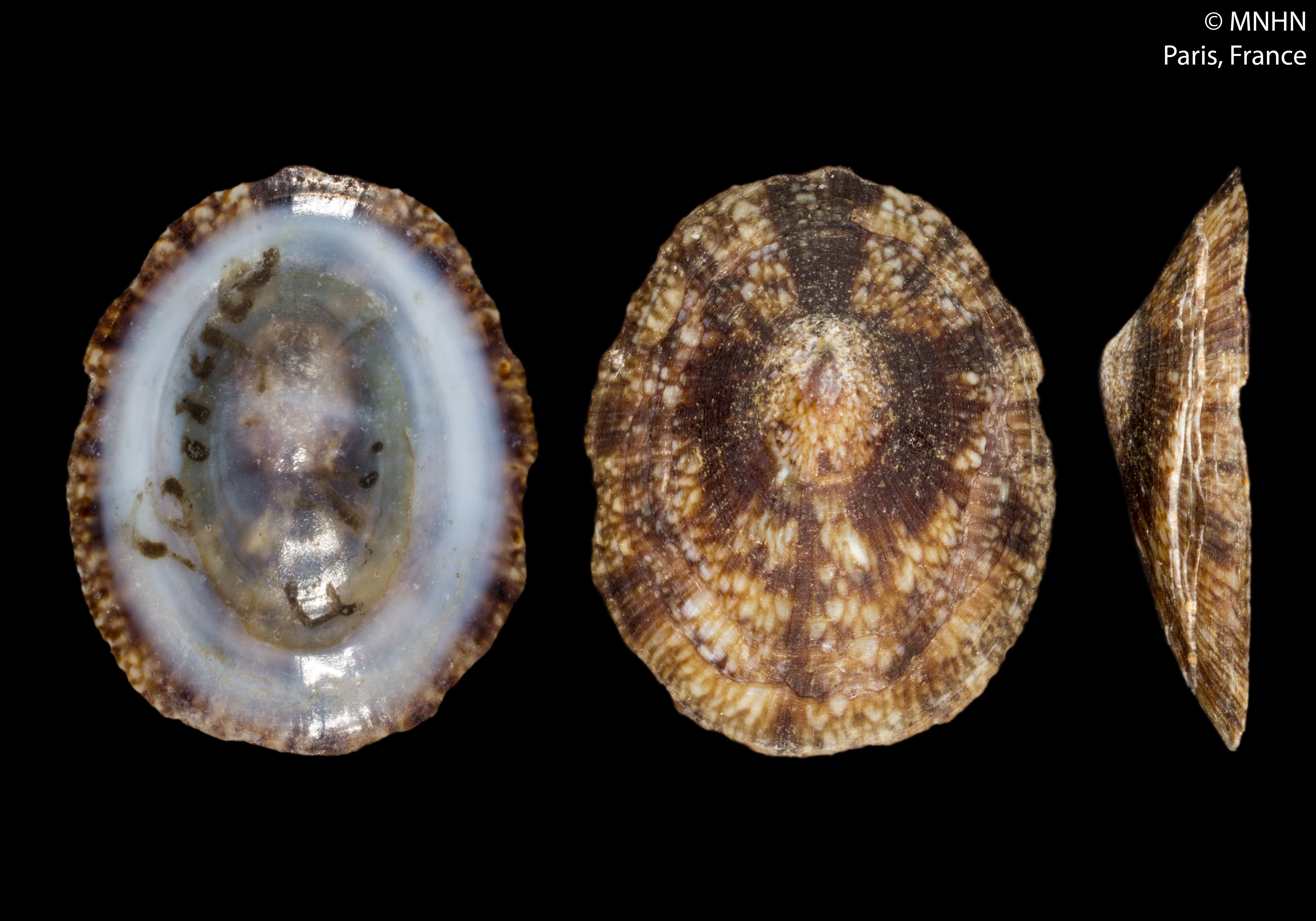
- Shell of Lottia septiformis (syntype at MNHN, Paris)

Scientific classification
- Kingdom: Animalia
- Phylum: Mollusca
- Class: Gastropoda
- Subclass: Patellogastropoda
- Family: Lottiidae
- Genus: Lottia
- Species: L. septiformis

Binomial name
- Lottia septiformis (Quoy & Gaimard, 1834)

Synonyms
- Patelloida septiformis Quoy & Gaimard, 1834 (original combination)

= Lottia septiformis =

Species of gastropod

Lottia septiformis is a species of sea snail, a true limpet, a marine gastropod mollusk in the family Lottiidae, one of the families of true limpets.

== Description ==
The length of the shell attains 14.5 mm.

== Distribution ==
This marine species is endemic to Australia and occurs off New South Wales, Tasmania, Victoria, and Western Australia.
