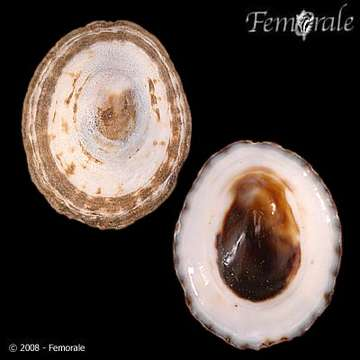

Scientific classification
- Kingdom: Animalia
- Phylum: Mollusca
- Class: Gastropoda
- Subclass: Patellogastropoda
- Family: Lottiidae
- Genus: Lottia
- Species: L. cassis

Binomial name
- Lottia cassis (Eschscholtz, 1833)

= Lottia cassis =

Species of gastropod

Lottia cassis is a species of sea snail, a true limpet, a marine gastropod mollusk in the family Lottiidae, one of the families of true limpets.

== Distribution ==
It can be found in the Pacific Northwest in the Okhotsk Sea and off of Japan and Eastern Russia.
