= Lottia argrantesta =

Scientific classification
- Domain: Eukaryota
- Kingdom: Animalia
- Phylum: Mollusca
- Class: Gastropoda
- Subclass: Patellogastropoda
- Family: Lottiidae
- Genus: Lottia
- Species: L. argrantesta

Binomial name
- Lottia argrantesta Simison & Lindberg, 2003

Species of gastropod

Lottia argrantesta is a species of limpet in the family Lottiidae. It was first described in 2003. It is native to the Gulf of California.
