= Yayoiacmea oyamai =

Scientific classification
- Kingdom: Animalia
- Phylum: Mollusca
- Class: Gastropoda
- Subclass: Patellogastropoda
- Family: Lottiidae
- Genus: Yayoiacmea
- Species: Y. oyamai

Binomial name
- Yayoiacmea oyamai (Habe, 1955)

Species of gastropod

Yayoiacmea oyamai is a species of sea snail, a true limpet, a marine gastropod mollusk in the family Lottiidae, one of the families of true limpets.
