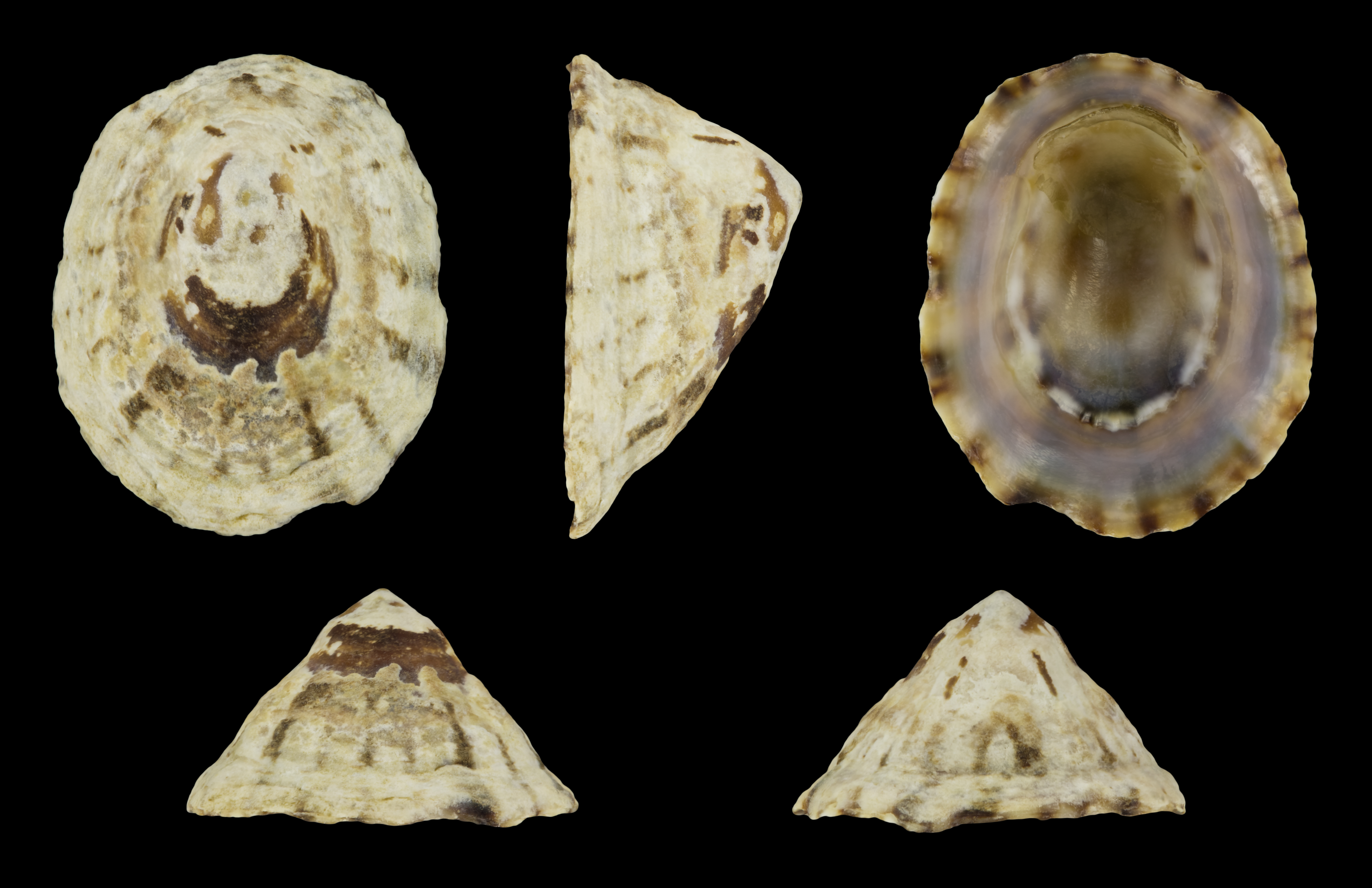

Scientific classification
- Kingdom: Animalia
- Phylum: Mollusca
- Class: Gastropoda
- Subclass: Patellogastropoda
- Family: Lottiidae
- Genus: Lottia
- Species: L. subrugosa

Binomial name
- Lottia subrugosa (d'Orbigny, 1841)

Synonyms
- Acmaea onychina (Gould, 1852); Acmaea subrugosa d'Orbigny, 1841; Collisella subrugosa (d'Orbigny, 1841); Helcion subrugosa (d'Orbigny, 1841); Lottia onychina Gould, 1852; Patella muelleri Dunker, 1875

= Lottia subrugosa =

Species of gastropod

Lottia subrugosa is a species of sea snail, a true limpet, a marine gastropod mollusk in the family Lottiidae. It is still designated under its synonyms Acmaea subrugosa or Collisella subrugosa in many textbooks.

== Distribution and habitat ==
This species is found along the coasts of Brazil and Uruguay, mostly in the mid-intertidal zone. It is the most common limpet with large population sizes in the Brazilian midlittoral. It can fill the small gaps in mussel beds dominated by Brachidontes solisianus and Brachidontes darwinianus. They are also very abundant in the regions dominated by the barnacle Tetraclita stalactifera.

== Description ==
The shell size is between 16 and 30 mm
