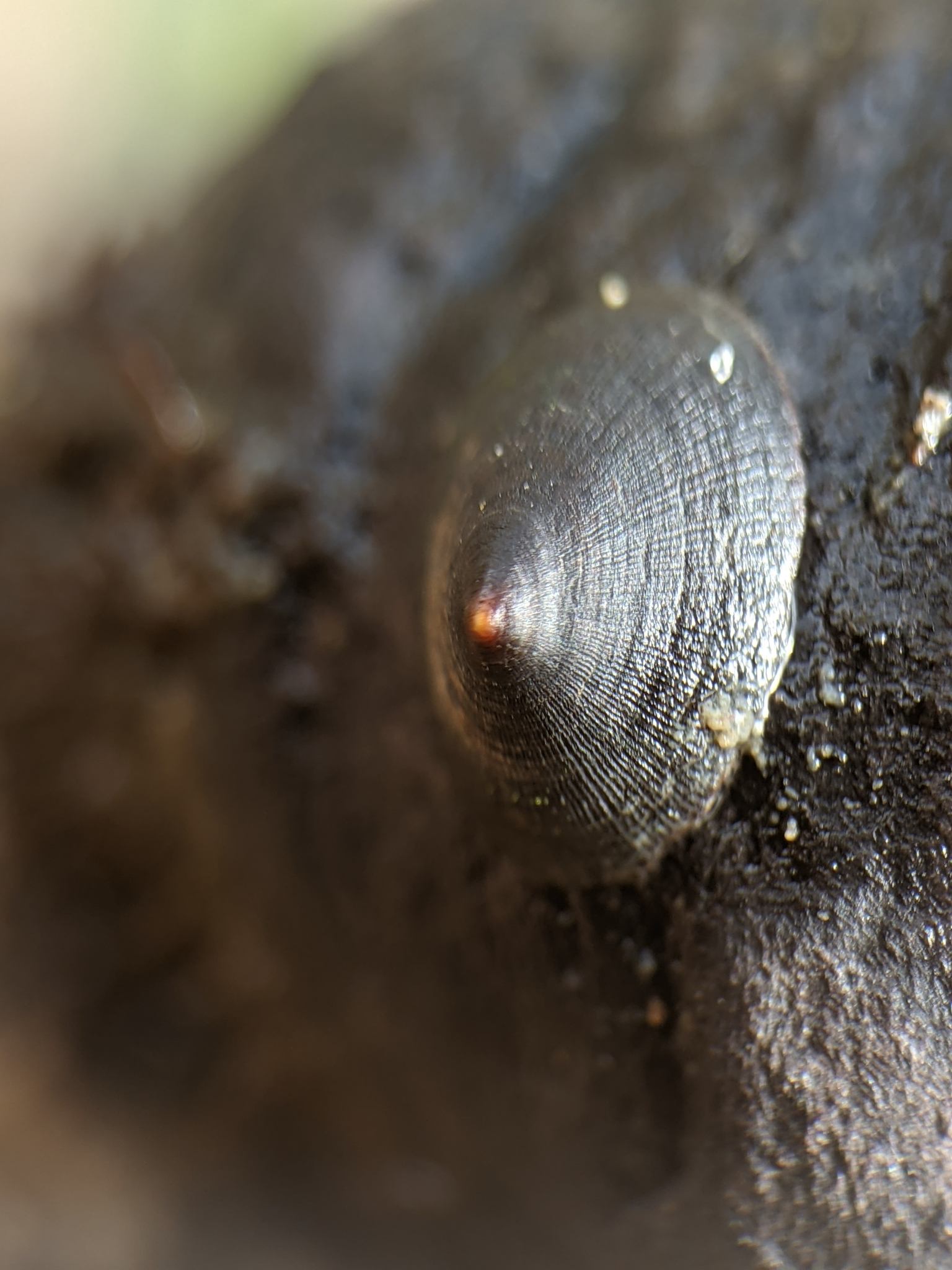

Scientific classification
- Kingdom: Animalia
- Phylum: Mollusca
- Class: Gastropoda
- Subclass: Patellogastropoda
- Family: Lottiidae
- Genus: Lottia
- Species: L. asmi

Binomial name
- Lottia asmi (Middendorff, 1847)

Synonyms
- Collisella asmi (Middendorff, 1847)

= Lottia asmi =

Black limpet

Species of gastropod

Lottia asmi, commonly known as the black limpet, is a species of sea snail, a marine gastropod mollusk in the family Lottiidae. It is found in shallow water in the eastern Pacific Ocean, usually in the intertidal zone.

== Description ==
This small limpet grows to a length of 10 mm (0.4 in) and a height of 8 mm (0.3 in), the apex being closer to the anterior end. The exterior is smooth and often rather worn, but fine sculptured radial ridges are sometimes visible near the margin. The exterior is brownish- or greyish-black, and the interior is black, sometimes with a pale band near the margin.

== Distribution and habitat ==
Lottia asmi is native to the northeastern Pacific Ocean, its range extending from southern Alaska to the Revillagigedo Islands in Mexico. It is usually found in the intertidal zone living on the shell of the black turban snail (Tegula funebralis). It occasionally inhabits the shell of the California mussel (Mytilus californianus) or the speckled turban (Tegula gallina), or lives directly on a rock substrate, and on one occasion on a sponge. It favours living mollusc shells but has been found on shells occupied by hermit crabs.

== Ecology ==
L. asmi is a herbivore and grazes on the microalgae growing on the shell of its host. It may change from one host shell to another at low tide, when the turban shells tend to aggregate. At Pigeon Point, California, juveniles reach maturity at about eight months old. Reproduction is intermittent throughout the year, with possible spawning events in March and another in October as well as a prolonged spawning period in mid-summer. The larvae pass through a planktonic phase with a coiled shell before settling, undergoing metamorphosis and adopting the adult, conical shape. This is a fast growing species with a high reproductive output.
