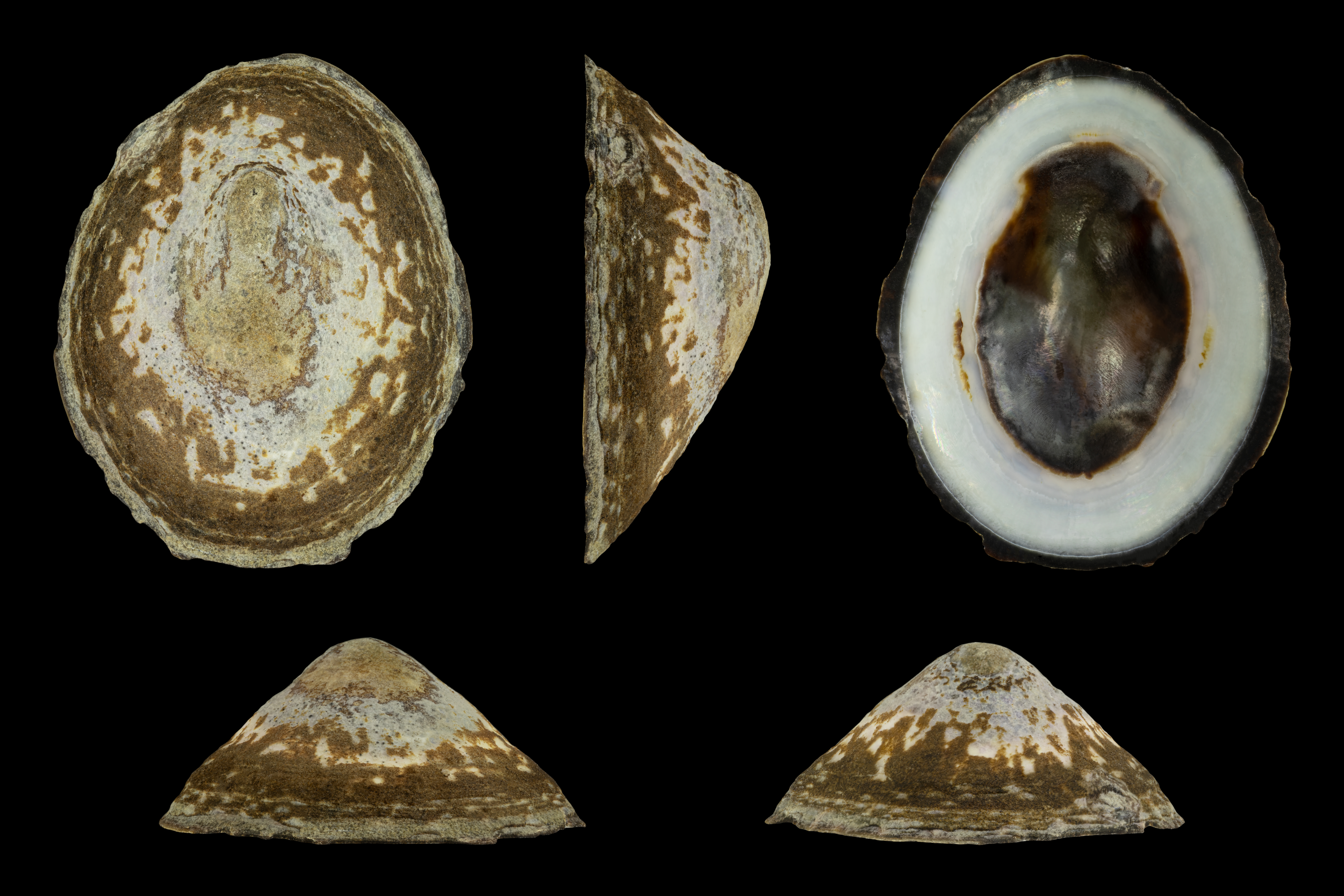

Scientific classification
- Kingdom: Animalia
- Phylum: Mollusca
- Class: Gastropoda
- Subclass: Patellogastropoda
- Family: Lottiidae
- Genus: Lottia
- Species: L. orbignyi

Binomial name
- Lottia orbignyi (Dall, 1909)

Synonyms
- Lottia orbigny [sic] (misspelling)

= Lottia orbignyi =

Species of gastropod

Lottia orbignyi is a species of sea snail, a true limpet, a marine gastropod mollusk in the family Lottiidae, one of the families of true limpets.

== Distribution ==
San Pablo, Peru (18°sur) hasta Pirulil, isla de Chiloé, Chile (42°sur)
