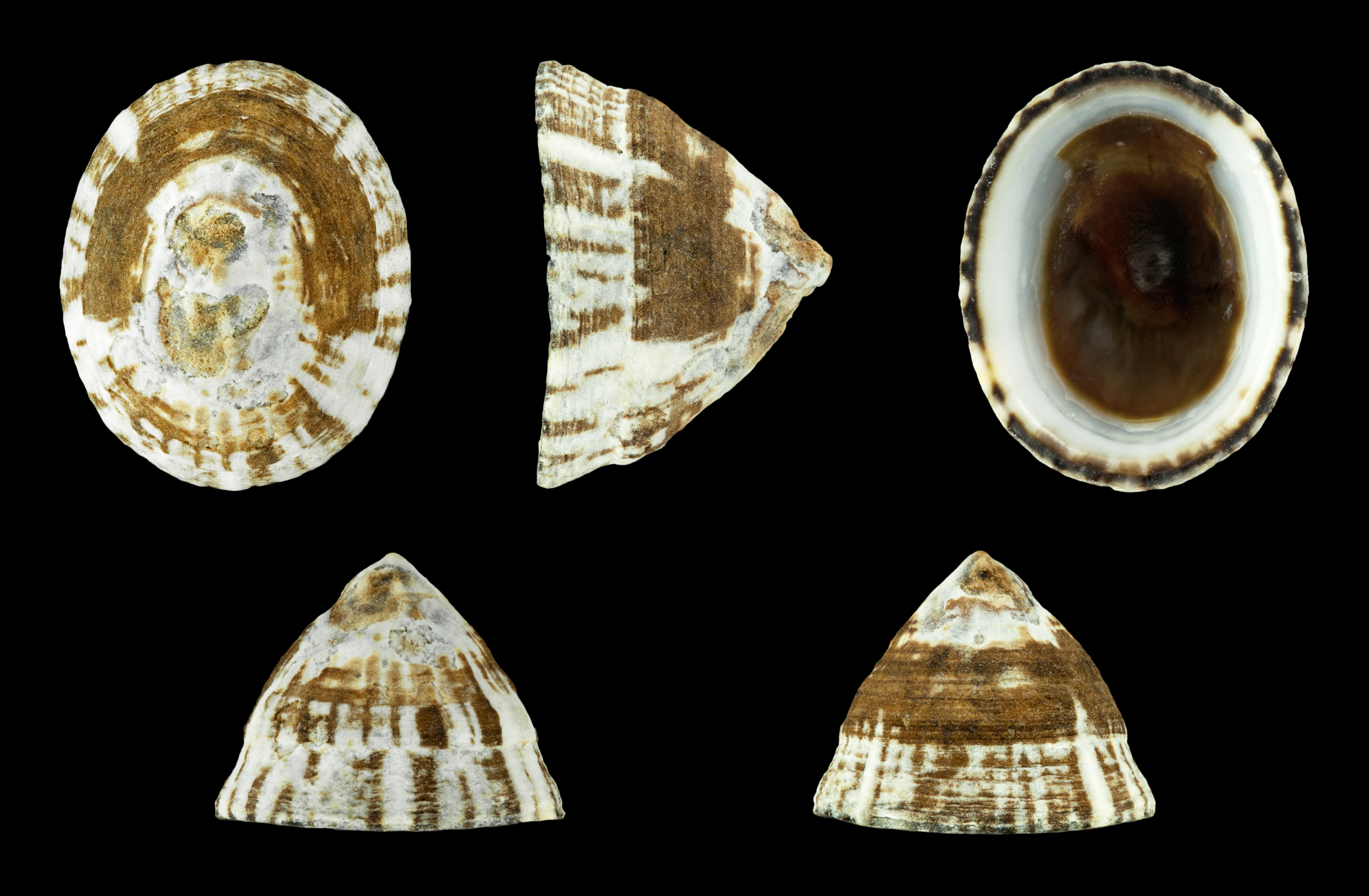

Scientific classification
- Kingdom: Animalia
- Phylum: Mollusca
- Class: Gastropoda
- Subclass: Patellogastropoda
- Family: Lottiidae
- Genus: Lottia
- Species: L. leucopleura

Binomial name
- Lottia leucopleura (Gmelin, 1791)

Synonyms
- Acmaea leucopleura (Gmelin, 1791); Patella leucopleura Gmelin, 1791 (original combination)

= Lottia leucopleura =

Species of gastropod

Lottia leucopleura is a species of sea snail, a true limpet, a marine gastropod mollusk in the family Lottiidae, one of the families of true limpets.

== Distribution ==
This species lives in the Caribbean Sea and in the Gulf of Mexico.
