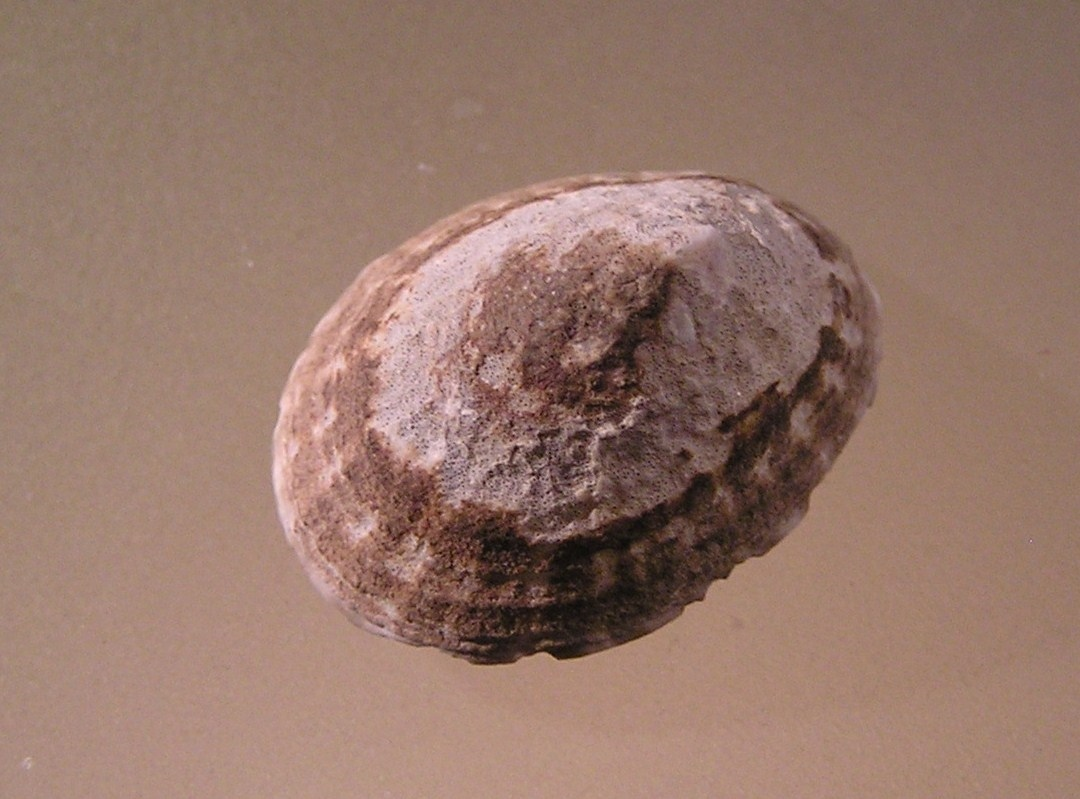

Scientific classification
- Kingdom: Animalia
- Phylum: Mollusca
- Class: Gastropoda
- Subclass: Patellogastropoda
- Family: Lottiidae
- Genus: Lottia
- Species: L. luchuana

Binomial name
- Lottia luchuana (Pilsbry, 1901)

= Lottia luchuana =

Species of gastropod

Lottia luchuana is a species of sea snail, a true limpet, a marine gastropod mollusk in the family Lottiidae, one of the families of true limpets.

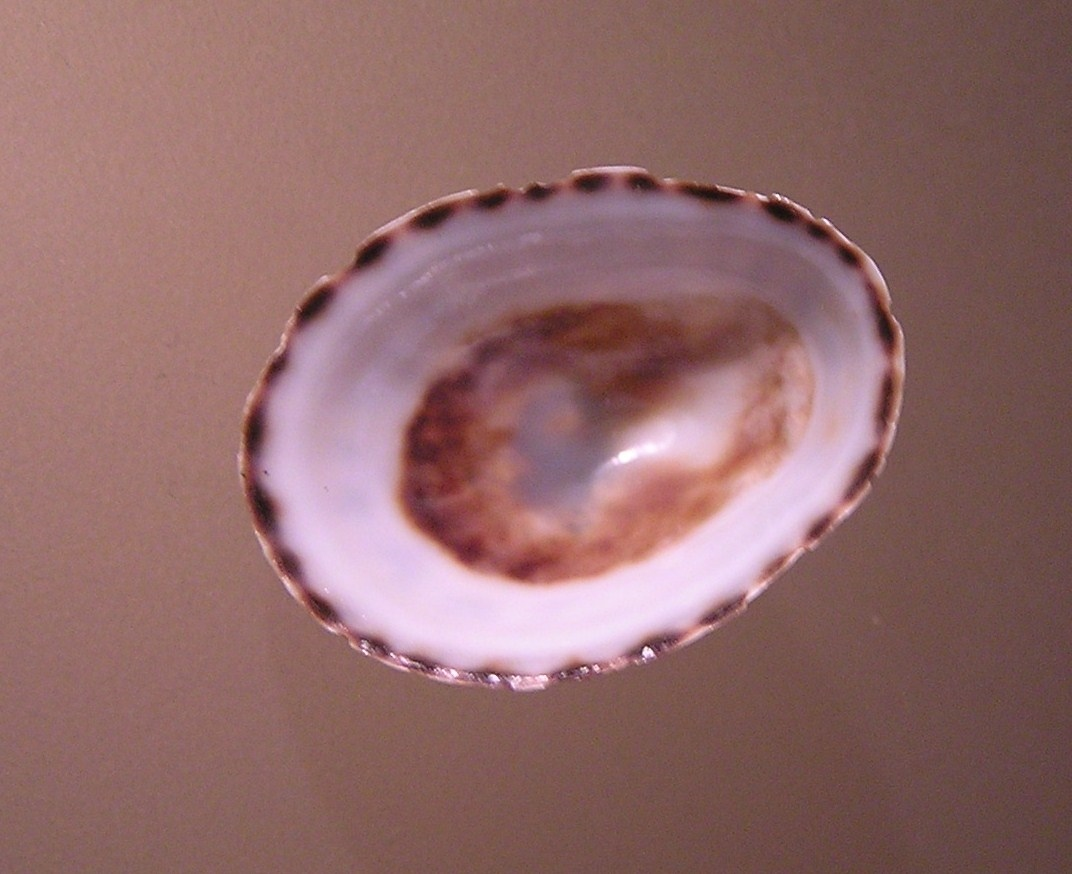
basal view
