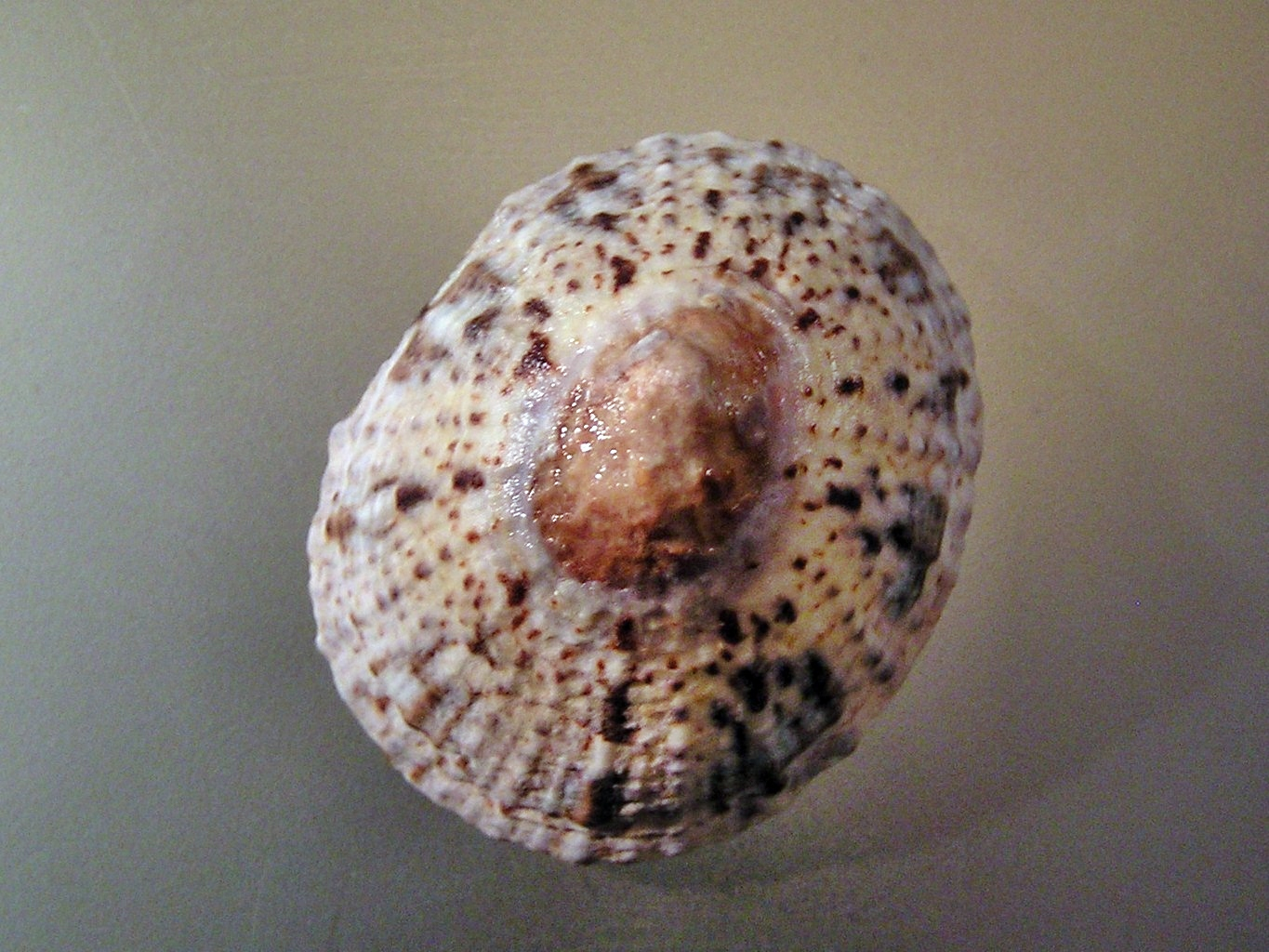

Scientific classification
- Kingdom: Animalia
- Phylum: Mollusca
- Class: Gastropoda
- Subclass: Patellogastropoda
- Family: Lottiidae
- Genus: Lottia
- Species: L. dorsuosa

Binomial name
- Lottia dorsuosa (Gould, 1859)

= Lottia dorsuosa =

Species of gastropod

Lottia dorsuosa is a species of limpet in the family Lottiidae. It is known commonly as the bumpy limpet. It is native to the northwestern Pacific, occurring along the coasts of Japan, Korea, and Taiwan.
