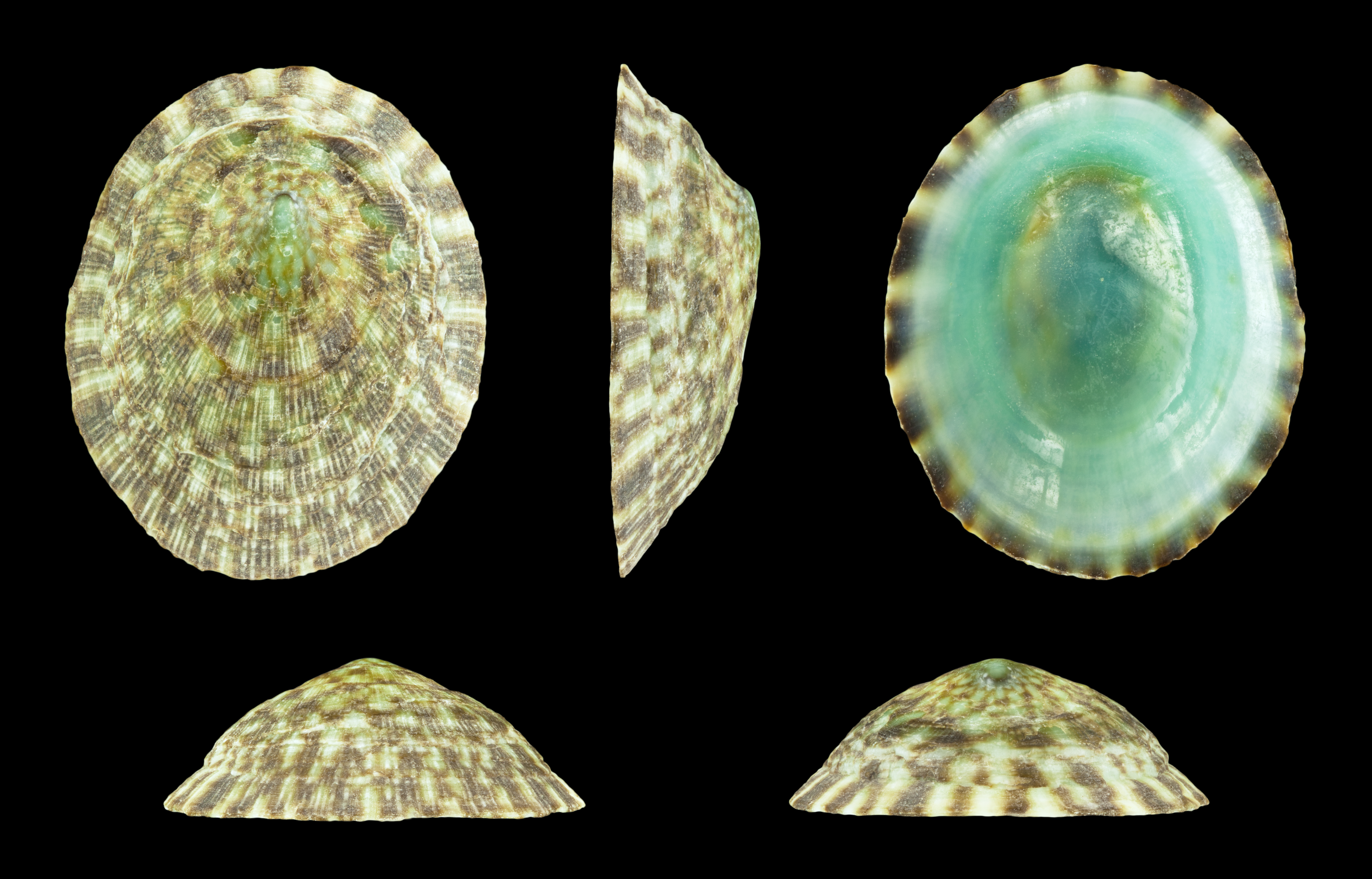

Scientific classification
- Kingdom: Animalia
- Phylum: Mollusca
- Class: Gastropoda
- Subclass: Patellogastropoda
- Family: Lottiidae
- Genus: Lottia
- Species: L. mesoleuca

Binomial name
- Lottia mesoleuca (Menke, 1851)

Synonyms
- Acmaea mesoleuca Menke, 1851; Scurria mesoleuca (Menke, 1851)

= Lottia mesoleuca =

Species of gastropod

Lottia mesoleuca is a species of sea snail, a true limpet, a marine gastropod mollusk in the family Lottiidae, one of the families of true limpets.
