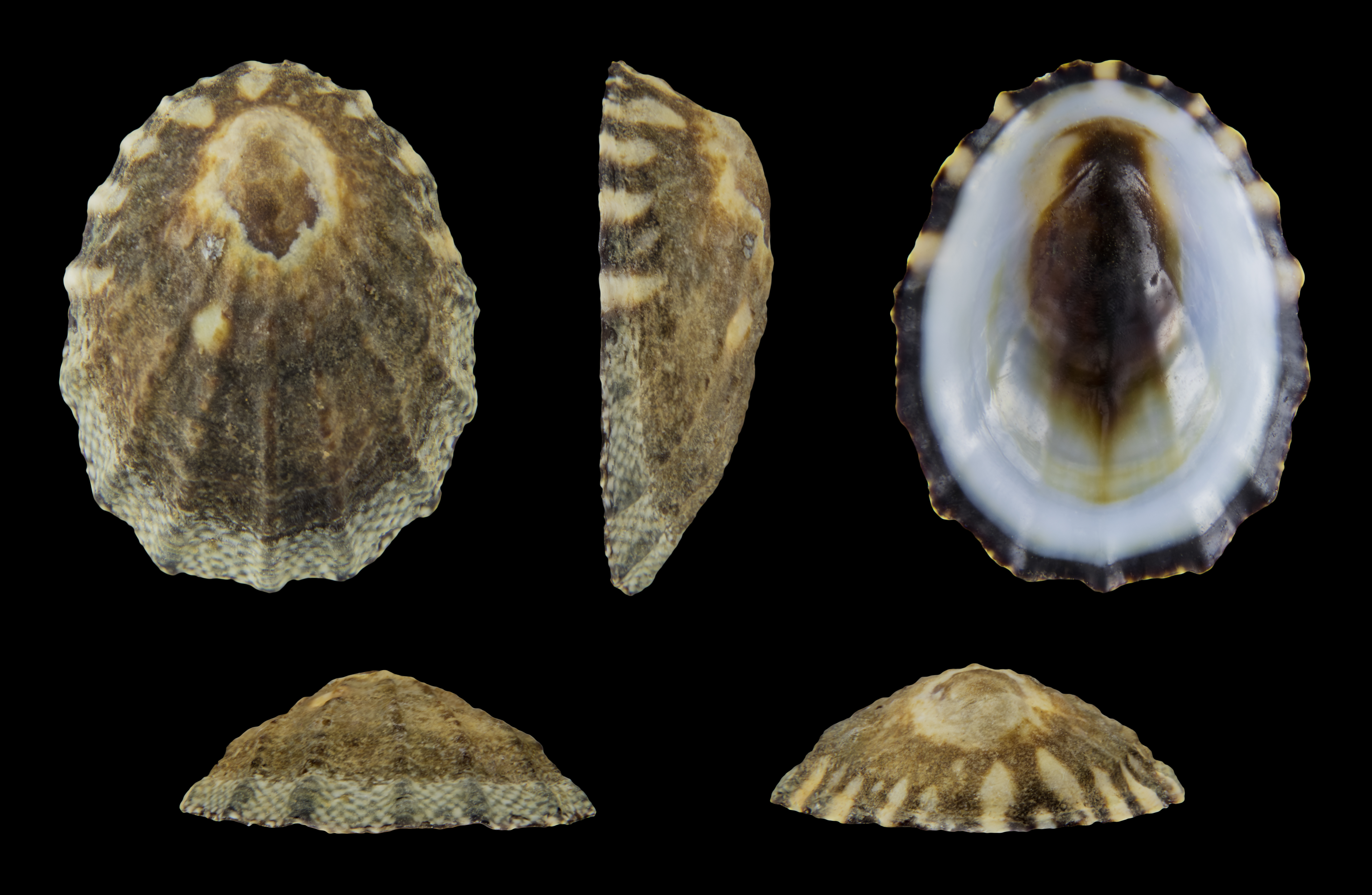

Scientific classification
- Kingdom: Animalia
- Phylum: Mollusca
- Class: Gastropoda
- Subclass: Patellogastropoda
- Family: Lottiidae
- Genus: Lottia
- Species: L. digitalis

Binomial name
- Lottia digitalis (Rathke, 1833)

Synonyms
- Collisella digitalis; Acmaea digitalis

= Lottia digitalis =

Species of gastropod

Lottia digitalis, commonly known as the fingered limpet or ribbed limpet, is a species of sea snail, a true limpet, a marine gastropod mollusk in the family Lottiidae. These limpets are usually found on the surface of rocks in the high intertidal region on the coastal fringes of the north-eastern Pacific Ocean.

== Description ==
This limpet grows up to thirty millimetres long and is shaped like a low cone with the apex close to the anterior edge. The anterior slope is concave and sometimes overhanging. The posterior slope is convex and has heavy radial ribbing and the margin is somewhat lobed and irregular. The shell characteristics are very variable. The color is usually brown or dark olive with white patches.

== Distribution and habitat ==
The range of L. digitalis extends from northern Alaska to northern Mexico. It is a common species and is found among acorn barnacles on vertical rock faces in high to mid-intertidal zones, on both exposed and sheltered coasts. In California, young limpets, up to ten millimetres in diameter, often live on the opercular plates of gooseneck barnacles, Pollicipes polymerus and on mussel shells. In both cases, the colouring varies from that of the rock-based form and provides camouflage.

== Behavior ==
On the coast of central California, L. digitalis coexists with the similar species, Lottia scabra, but each occupies a slightly different habitat. L. digitalis tends to occupy vertical rock faces or overhangs and certain horizontal ones clothed by algae and barnacles. L. digitalis clump together more often, prefer wave-exposed areas, occupy sites further up the shore and are seldom found in rock pools. Both species move about freely when the tide is up but L. digitalis settles in a different location at each low tide whereas L. scabra tends to home to the same spot. L. scabra has a more rugged outline and grows to fit the rock surface of its home base. The differences in micro-habitat may be explained by its greater tolerance of exposure to desiccation during low tides in less protected sites because it is able to retain water better. If transplanted to unfamiliar territory, each species soon reselects its typical base habitat.

In an experiment, when these two species were caged together with only vertical surfaces available, it was found that L. scabra grew at a much slower rate and achieved a much smaller maximum size than similar limpets in control plots. It seems that the ability of L. digitalis to respond to seasonal changes by moving up and down the shore and utilising resources better give it an edge over the more static species which remains for life in its restricted home range. L. scabra is less able to compete under optimal conditions and is therefore restricted to horizontal desiccating habitats.
