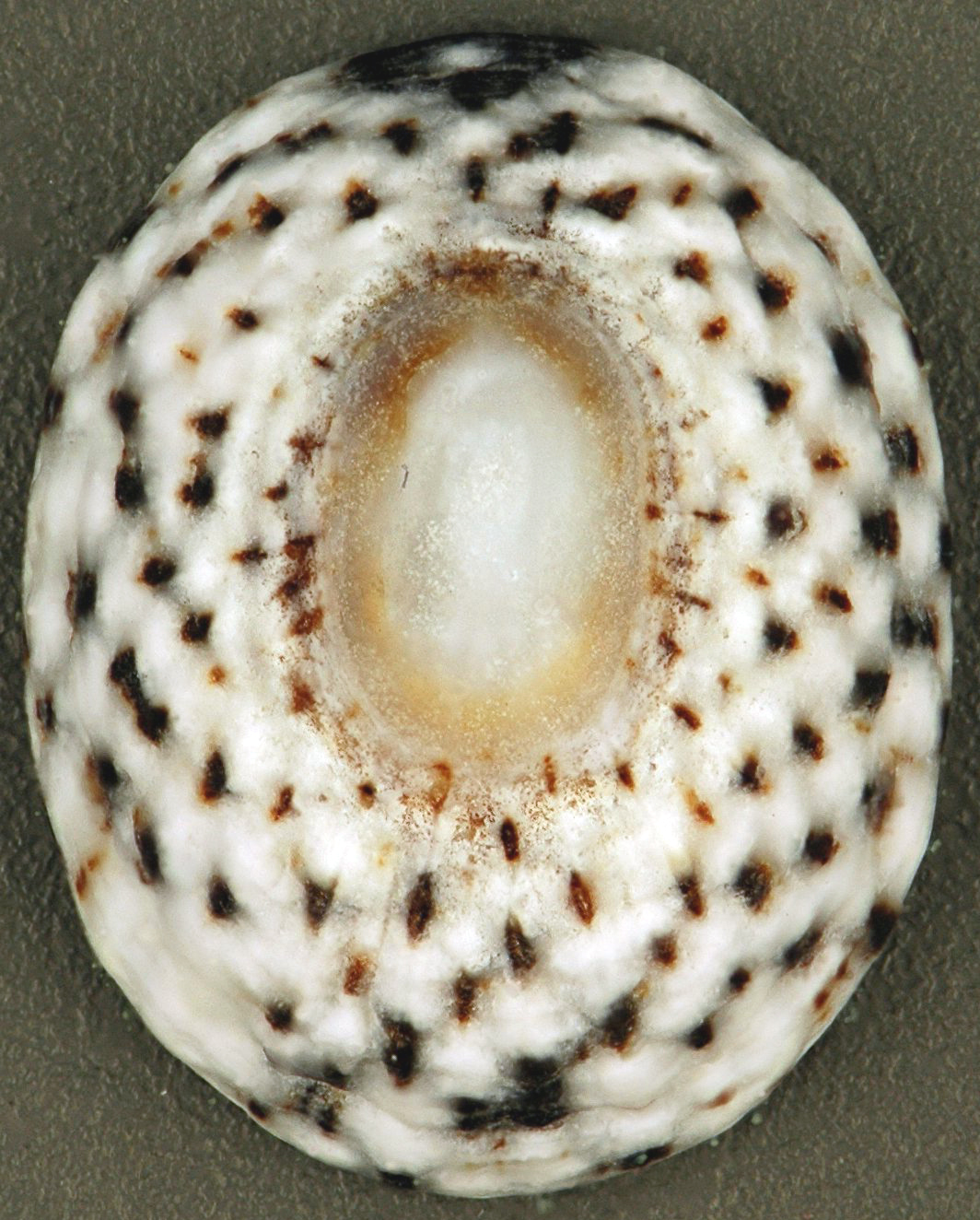
- Dorsal view of a shell of Lottia jamaicensis

Scientific classification
- Kingdom: Animalia
- Phylum: Mollusca
- Class: Gastropoda
- Subclass: Patellogastropoda
- Family: Lottiidae
- Genus: Lottia
- Species: L. jamaicensis

Binomial name
- Lottia jamaicensis (Gmelin, 1791)

= Lottia jamaicensis =

Species of gastropod

Lottia jamaicensis is a species of sea snail, a true limpet, a marine gastropod mollusk in the family Lottiidae, one of the families of true limpets.
