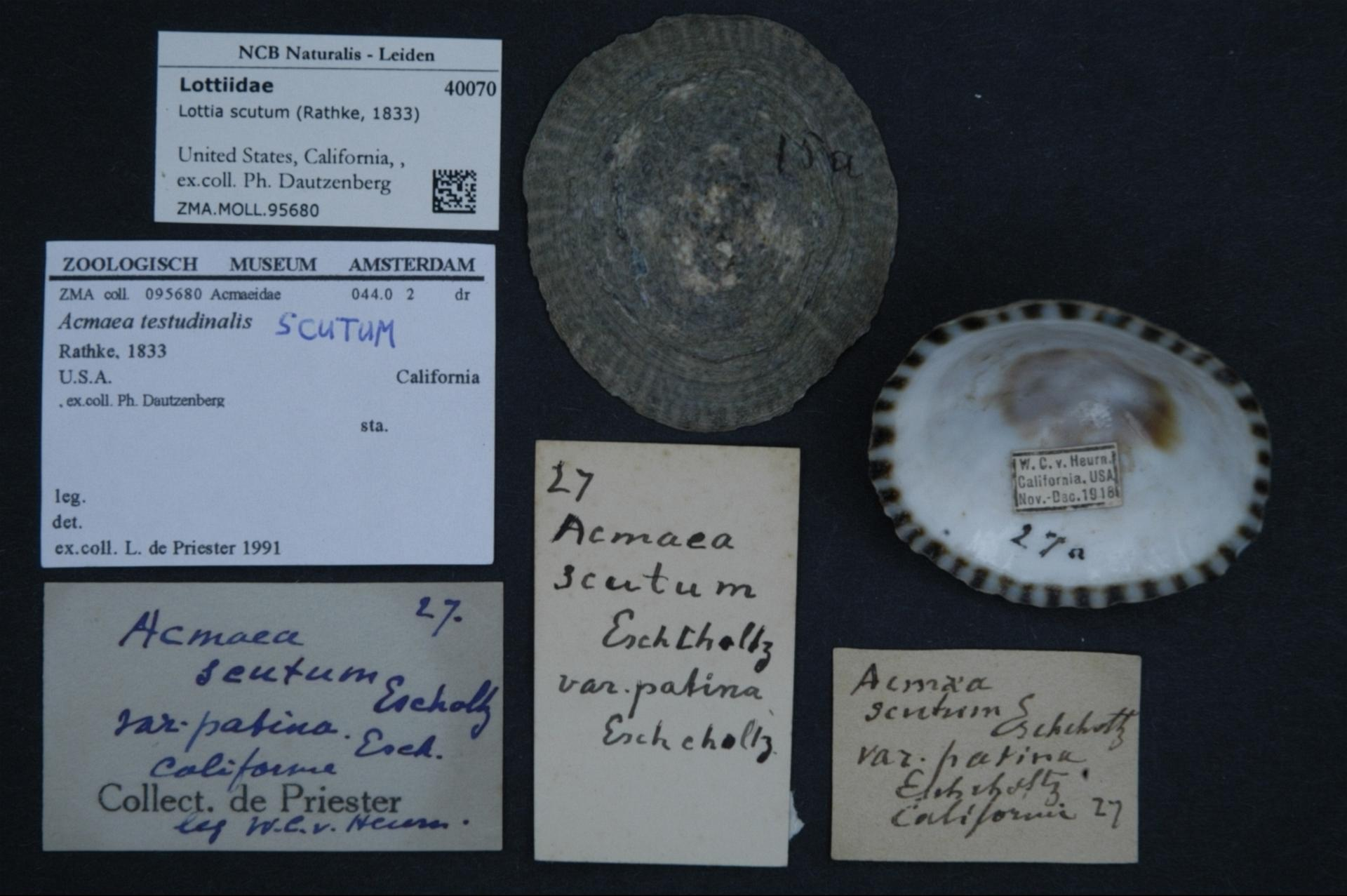

Scientific classification
- Kingdom: Animalia
- Phylum: Mollusca
- Class: Gastropoda
- Subclass: Patellogastropoda
- Family: Lottiidae
- Genus: Lottia
- Species: L. scutum

Binomial name
- Lottia scutum (Rathke, 1833)

= Lottia scutum =

Species of gastropod

Lottia scutum is a species of sea snail, a true limpet, a marine gastropod mollusk in the family Lottiidae, one of the families of true limpets.

== Description ==
L. scutum is a plate limpet. It grows to up to sixty millimetres long with a broad, flat shell. The apex is near the front and the anterior slope is smooth and convex with inconspicuous riblets. The colour varies from grey to tan with whitish spots and rays, and the head has golden brown cephalic tentacles which distinguishes it from other species.

== Distribution ==
L. scutum is found on the Pacific coast of North America from the Bering Sea southwards to Point Conception, California.
