= Lottia tenuisculptata =

Scientific classification
- Kingdom: Animalia
- Phylum: Mollusca
- Class: Gastropoda
- Subclass: Patellogastropoda
- Family: Lottiidae
- Genus: Lottia
- Species: L. tenuisculptata

Binomial name
- Lottia tenuisculptata Sasaki & Okutani, 1994

Species of gastropod

Lottia tenuisculptata is a species of sea snail, a true limpet, a marine gastropod mollusk in the family Lottiidae, one of the families of true limpets.
