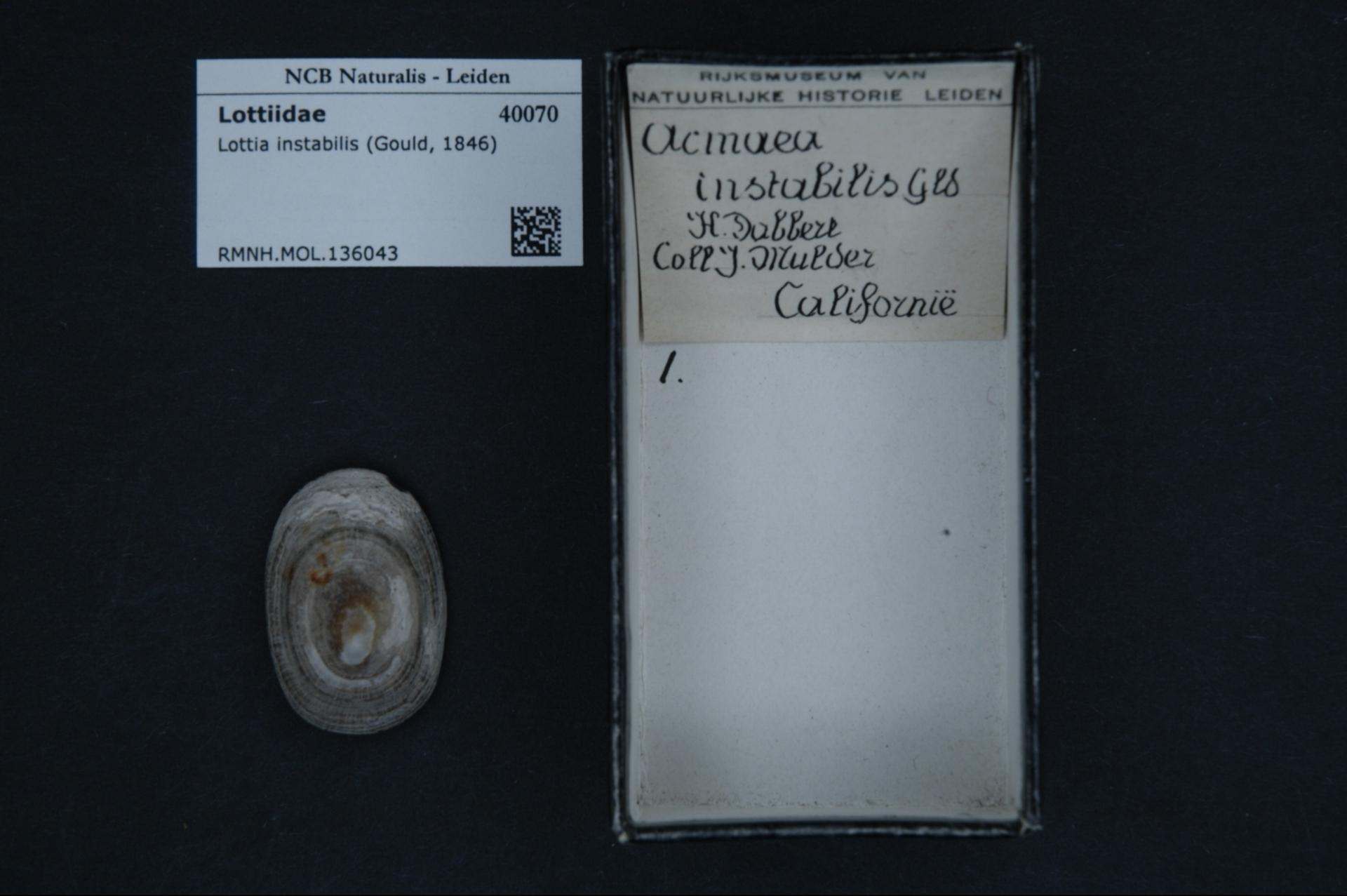

Scientific classification
- Kingdom: Animalia
- Phylum: Mollusca
- Class: Gastropoda
- Subclass: Patellogastropoda
- Family: Lottiidae
- Genus: Lottia
- Species: L. instabilis

Binomial name
- Lottia instabilis (Gould, 1846)

Synonyms
- Acmaea instabilis (Gould, 1846); Acmaea ochracea (Dall, 1871); Collisella instabilis (Gould, 1846); Collisella patina var. ochracea Dall, 1871; Lottia ochracea (Dall, 1871); Patella instabilis Gould, 1846

= Lottia instabilis =

Species of mollusc

Lottia instabilis is a species of sea snail, a true limpet, a marine gastropod mollusk in the family Lottiidae. Common names include the unstable limpet, the unstable seaweed limpet and the rocking chair limpet. It is native to the northern Pacific Ocean where it feeds on kelp in the intertidal zone and the shallow sub-littoral zone.

== Description ==
The shell of Lottia instabilis is specially adapted by the shape of its rim to adhere to the holdfasts and stipes of kelp. The sides of the rim are elongated and nearly parallel, but both anterior and posterior end are raised up; this means it cannot lie flat and seal itself to a level surface but it can seal to a curved surface. The shell is smooth with an even margin. It is often mainly brownish, and may be paler near the apex, which is somewhat towards the anterior end of the shell. The interior of the shell is bluish-white, sometimes with a dark margin and a dark blotch near the apex. Individuals in the northern part of the range tend to have solid shell colors and be larger than those in the south, which tend to have tesselated patterns of brown and gray on their shells.

== Distribution and habitat ==
Native to the northeastern Pacific Ocean, L. instabilis is present from Kodiak Island, off the coast of Alaska, to San Diego, California. It is often found on the holdfasts and stipes of kelp, at depths ranging from the intertidal zone down to about 73 m (240 ft). It also occurs on bare rock and sometimes on the shells of gastropod mollusks, including those occupied by hermit crabs.

== Ecology ==
L. instabilis is a herbivore and feeds directly on kelps such as Saccharina dentigera and Pterygophora californica. Being such a specialised feeder, it can essentially be considered to be a parasite of the kelp host. It is part of a genus whose rock-associated members are distributed widely in the Pacific Ocean and this species probably evolved in the Pacific, alongside its kelp hosts. The purple seastar (Pisaster ochraceus) is a predator of this limpet, and when the seastar approaches, the limpet flees.
