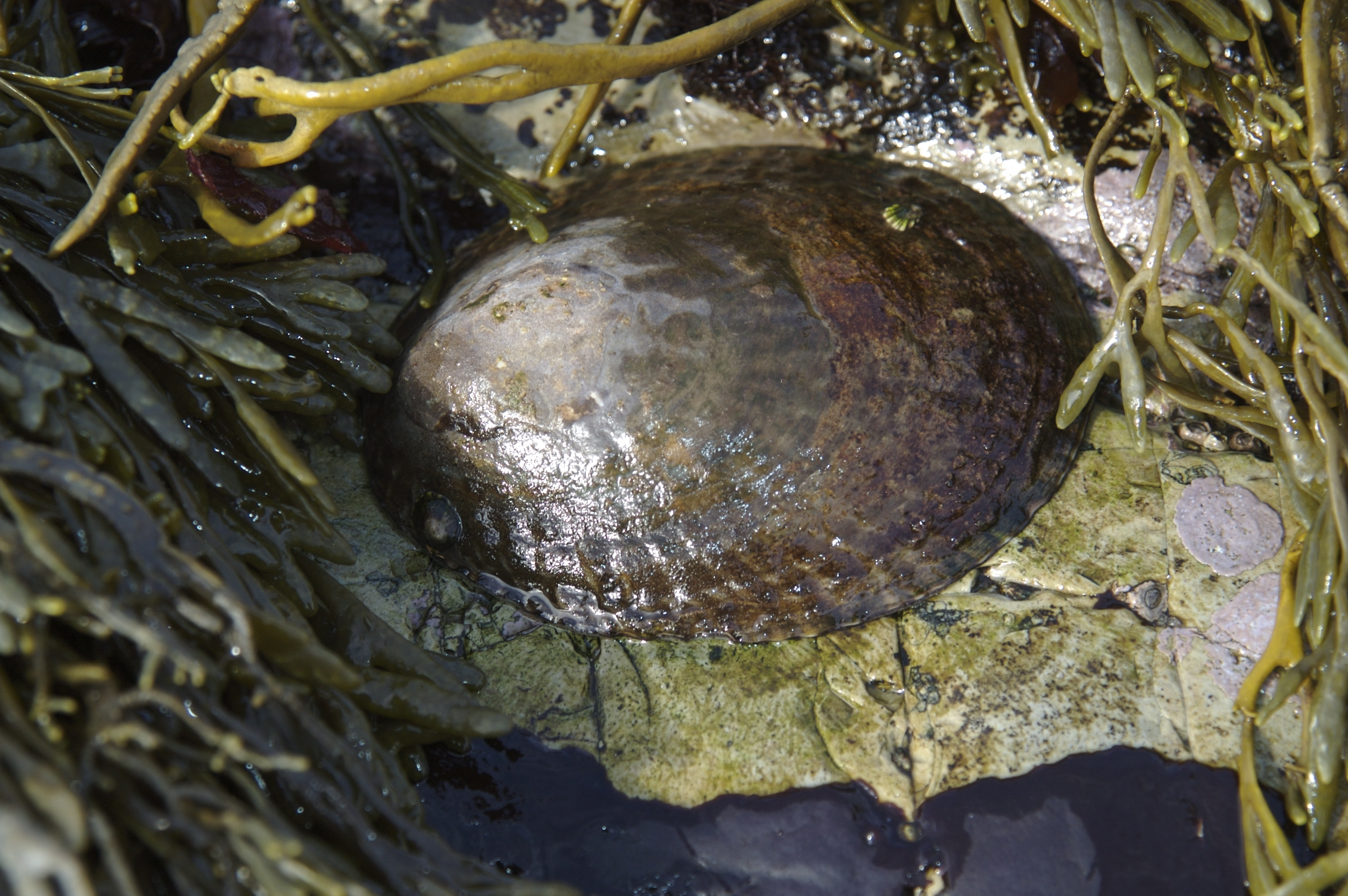
- Lottia gigantea

Scientific classification
- Domain: Eukaryota
- Kingdom: Animalia
- Phylum: Mollusca
- Class: Gastropoda
- Subclass: Patellogastropoda
- Family: Lottiidae
- Subfamily: Lottiinae
- Tribe: Lottiini
- Genus: Lottia; Gray, 1833

Species
- See text

Synonyms
- Acmaea (Collisella) Dall, 1871; Collisella Dall, 1871; Collisella (Collisella) Dall, 1871; Collisella (Kikukozara) Habe, 1944; Collisellacmaea Christiaens, 1975; Conoidacmea Habe, 1944; Kikukozara Habe, 1944; Lecania Carpenter, 1866 (junior objective synonym of Lottia); Nomaeopelta S.S. Berry, 1958; Tecturella Carpenter, 1860 (junior homonym of Tecturella Stimpson, 1854); Tecturina Carpenter, 1861 (not available: nomen nudum)

= Lottia =

Genus of gastropods

Lottia is a genus of sea snails, specifically true limpets, marine gastropod mollusks in the subfamily Lottiinae of the family Lottiidae, one of the families of true limpets.

== Species ==
According to the World Register of Marine Species (WoRMS), the following species with accepted names are included within the genus Lottia :

- Lottia abrolhosensis (Petuch, 1979)
- Lottia acutapex (S. S. Berry, 1960)
- Lottia albicosta (Adams, 1845)
- † Lottia alveus, (Conrad, 1831) - eelgrass limpet, became extinct in the 20th century
- Lottia angusta (Moskalev in Golikov & Scarlato, 1967)
- Lottia antillarum G.B. Sowerby I, 1834
- Lottia argrantesta Simison & Lindberg, 2003
- Lottia asmi (Middendorff, 1847) -- black limpet
- Lottia atrata (Carpenter, 1857)
- Lottia austrodigitalis (Murphy, 1978) This species is cryptic species and a sibling species with Lottia digitalis. Existence of Lottia austrodigitalis as separate species was genetically confirmed in 2007.
- Lottia borealis (Lindberg, 1982) -- boreal limpet
- Lottia cassis (Eschscholtz, 1833)
- Lottia cellanica (Christiaens, 1980)
- Lottia conus (Test, 1945)
- Lottia cubensis (Reeve, 1855)
- Lottia dalliana (Pilsbry, 1891)
- Lottia digitalis (Rathke, 1833) - ribbed limpet
- Lottia discors (Philippi, 1849)
- Lottia dorsuosa (Gould, 1859)
- Lottia edmitchelli (Lipps, 1963)
- Lottia emydia (Dall, 1914)
- Lottia fascicularis (Menke, 1851)
- Lottia fenestrata (Reeve, 1855)
- Lottia filosa (Carpenter, 1865)
- Lottia formosa (Christiaens, 1980)
- Lottia gigantea G.B. Sowerby I, 1834 - owl limpet
- Lottia goshimai Nakayama, Sasaki & Nakano, 2017
- Lottia iani Scuderi, Nakano & Eernisse, 2021
- Lottia immaculata (Lindberg & McLean, 1981)
- Lottia instabilis (Gould, 1846) -- unstable limpet
- Lottia jamaicensis (Gmelin, 1791) - Jamaica limpet
- Lottia kogamogai Sasaki & Okutani, 1994
- Lottia langfordi (Habe, 1944)
- Lottia leucopleura (Gmelin, 1791) - black-rib limpet
- Lottia limatula (Carpenter, 1864) - file limpet
- Lottia lindbergi Sasaki & Okutani, 1994
- Lottia luchuana (Pilsbry, 1901)
- Lottia marcusi (Righi, 1966)
- Lottia mesoleuca (Menke, 1851)
- Lottia mimica Lindberg & McLean, 1981
- Lottia mitella (Menke, 1847)
- Lottia mixta (Reeve, 1855)
- Lottia mortoni (Christiaens, 1980)
- Lottia noronhensis (E. A. Smith, 1890)
- Lottia onychitis (Menke, 1843)
- Lottia orbignyi (Dall, 1909)
- Lottia painei Lindberg, 1987
- Lottia paradigitalis (Fritchman, 1960)
- Lottia pediculus (Philippi, 1846)
- Lottia peitaihoensis (Grabau & S. G. King, 1928)
- Lottia pelta (Rathke, 1833) - shield limpet
- Lottia persona (Rathke, 1833)
- Lottia rothi (Lindberg & McLean, 1981)
- Lottia scabra (Gould, 1846) - rough limpet
- Lottia scutum (Rathke, 1833)
- Lottia septiformis (Quoy & Gaimard, 1834)
- Lottia smithi Lindberg & McLean, 1981
- Lottia stanfordiana (Berry, 1957)
- Lottia strigatella (Carpenter, 1864)
- Lottia strongiana (Hertlein, 1958)
- Lottia subrotundata (Carpenter, 1865)
- Lottia subrugosa (d'Orbigny, 1846)
- Lottia tenuisculptata Sasaki & Okutani, 1994
- Lottia tranquebarica (Gmelin, 1791)
- Lottia triangularis (Carpenter, 1864) -- triangular limpet
- Lottia turveri (Hertlein & Strong, 1951)
- Lottia versicolor (Moskalev in Golikov & Scarlato, 1967)

Species brought into synonymy

- Lottia cymbiola (Gould, 1846): synonym of Scurria variabilis (G.B. Sowerby I, 1839)
- Lottia depicta (Hinds, 1842): synonym of Tectura depicta (Hinds, 1842)
- Lottia insessa (Hinds, 1842): synonym for Discurria insessa (Hinds, 1842)
- Lottia ochracea (Dall, 1871): synonym of Lottia instabilis (Gould, 1846)
- Lottia paleacea (Gould, 1853): synonym of Tectura paleacea (Gould, 1853)
- Lottia rosacea (Carpenter, 1864): synonym of Tectura rosacea (Carpenter, 1864)
- Lottia testudinalis (Müller, 1776): synonym of Testudinalia testudinalis (O. F. Müller, 1776)
- Lottia variabilis (Sowerby, 1839): synonym of Scurria variabilis (G.B. Sowerby I, 1839)

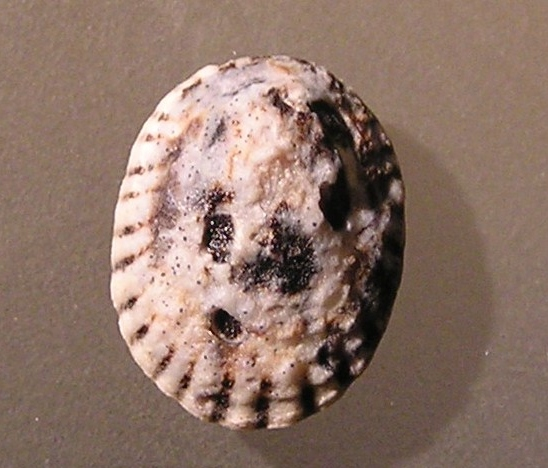
Lottia mixta

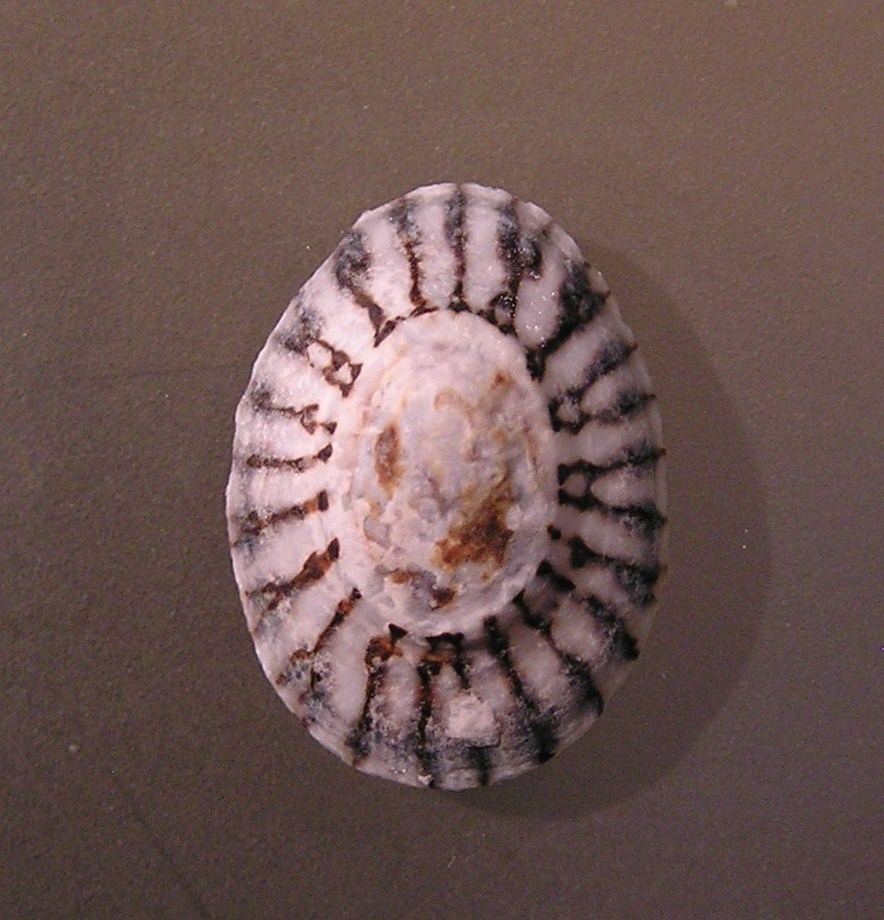
Lottia strigatella

The following species are also: synonym of species in current use by the Indo-Pacific Molluscan Database

- Lottia areneosa (Gould, 1846)
- Lottia heroldi (Dunker, 1861)
- Lottia (Lottia) compressa (Linnaeus, 1758)
- Lottia (Lottia) patina (Eschscholtz in Rathke, 1833)
- Lottia (Lottia) radiata (Eschscholtz in Rathke, 1833)

The Integrated Taxonomic Information System (ITIS) adds the following species

- Lottia ochracea (Dall, 1871) -- yellow limpet : synonym of Lottia instabilis (Gould, 1846)
