= Yayoiacmea =

Scientific classification
- Kingdom: Animalia
- Phylum: Mollusca
- Class: Gastropoda
- Subclass: Patellogastropoda
- Family: Lottiidae
- Genus: Yayoiacmea

Type species
- Collisella oyamai Habe, 1955

Synonyms
- Yayoiacmaea [sic] (misspelling)

Genus of gastropods

Yayoiacmea is a genus of sea snails, the true limpets, marine gastropod mollusks in the family Lottiidae.

== Species ==
Species within the genus Yayoiacmea include:

- Yayoiacmea oyamai (Habe, 1955)
