= Saccharina dentigera =

Scientific classification
- Domain: Eukaryota
- Clade: Sar
- Clade: Stramenopiles
- Division: Ochrophyta
- Class: Phaeophyceae
- Order: Laminariales
- Family: Laminariaceae
- Genus: Saccharina
- Species: S. dentigera

Binomial name
- Saccharina dentigera (Kjellman) C.E.Lane, C.Mayes, Druehl & G.W.Saunders, 2005

Synonyms
- Laminaria dentigera Kjellman, 1889

Species of Phaeophyceae

Saccharina dentigera is a species of brown algae (class Phaeophyceae), in the family Laminariaceae. It is native to shallow water in the northeastern Pacific Ocean from the Gulf of Alaska to Baja California.

== Taxonomy ==
This seaweed was first described in 1889 by the Swedish botanist Frans Reinhold Kjellman as Laminaria dentigera, the type location being Bering Island, where it was said to be fairly abundant, scattered across the sublittoral zone. In a revision of the genus Laminaria by C.E.Lane, C.Mayes, Druehl and G.W.Saunders in 2005, the species was transferred to the genus Saccharina, becoming Saccharina dentigera.

== Description ==
Saccharina dentigera is a large brown seaweed growing to a length of 1.5 m (5 ft). The thallus is dark brown, thick and leathery, often appearing palmate because of being split into broad lobes to within 10 cm (4 in) of its base. Younger thalli are entire with ovate blades. The thallus is supported on a robust, semi-rigid stipe, which has mucilage ducts on its surface near the upper end. The stipe is attached to a rock surface by a branched holdfast up to 8 cm (3 in) high. Each holdfast only bears one thallus, but new blades sometimes start to grow before the old ones are shed.

== Distribution and habitat ==
The species is found in the northeastern Pacific Ocean, its range extending from the western Gulf of Alaska to the Bering Sea and the Aleutian Islands off the coast of Alaska, and southwards to Ensenada, Baja California. It occurs on rocky substrates in the lower intertidal zone and the shallow subtidal zone.

== Ecology ==
Saccharina dentigera is one of the most abundant kelps in the southern Kodiak Islands, and is the dominant seaweed at most sites in the shallow subtidal zone. The kelp forests provide shelter and substrate for many species of marine organisms. In May, it is found at these sites with reproductive structures. The limpet Lottia instabilis is a specialist feeder on S. dentigera to the extent that it is essentially a parasite of the kelp.
