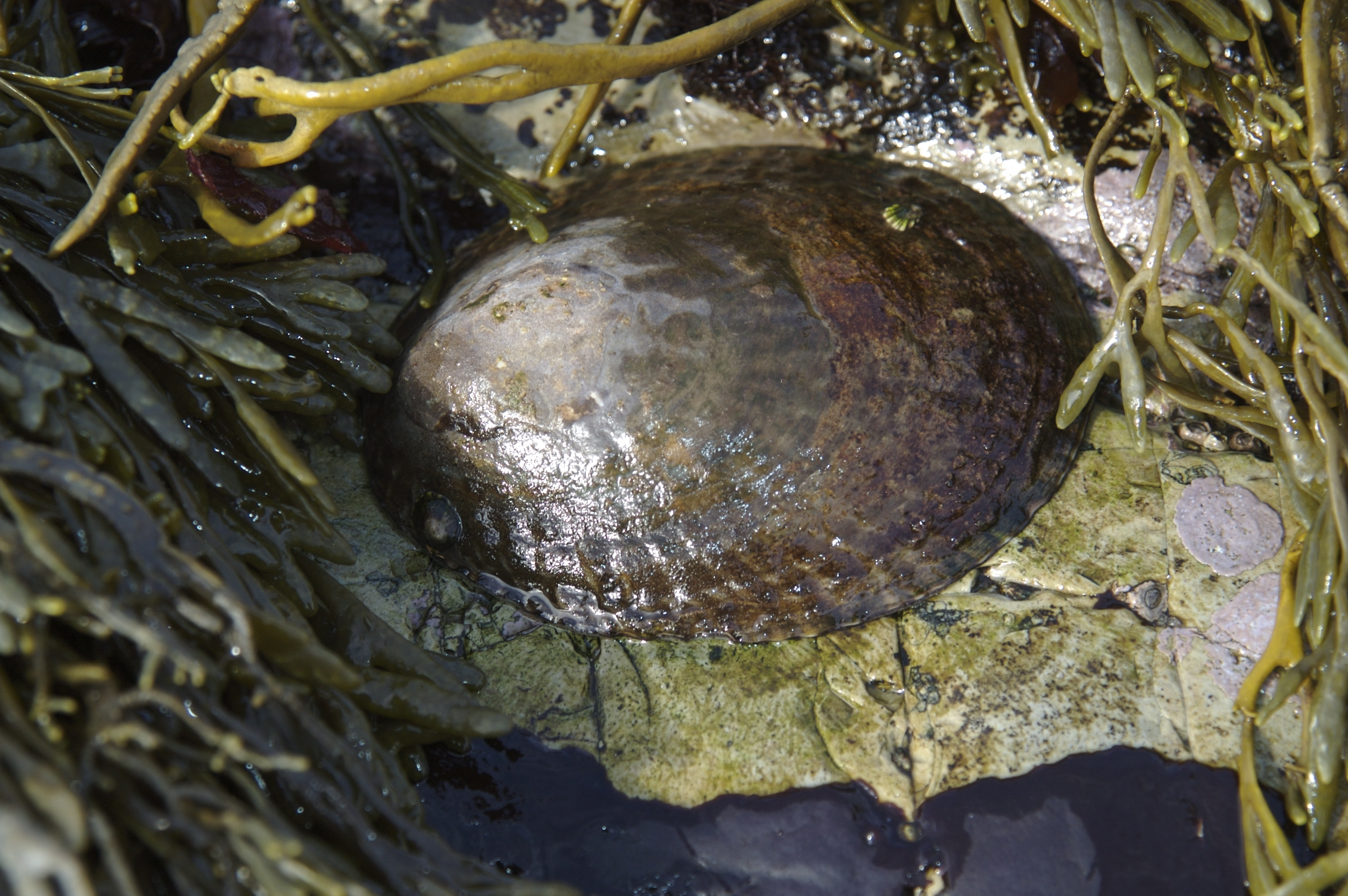

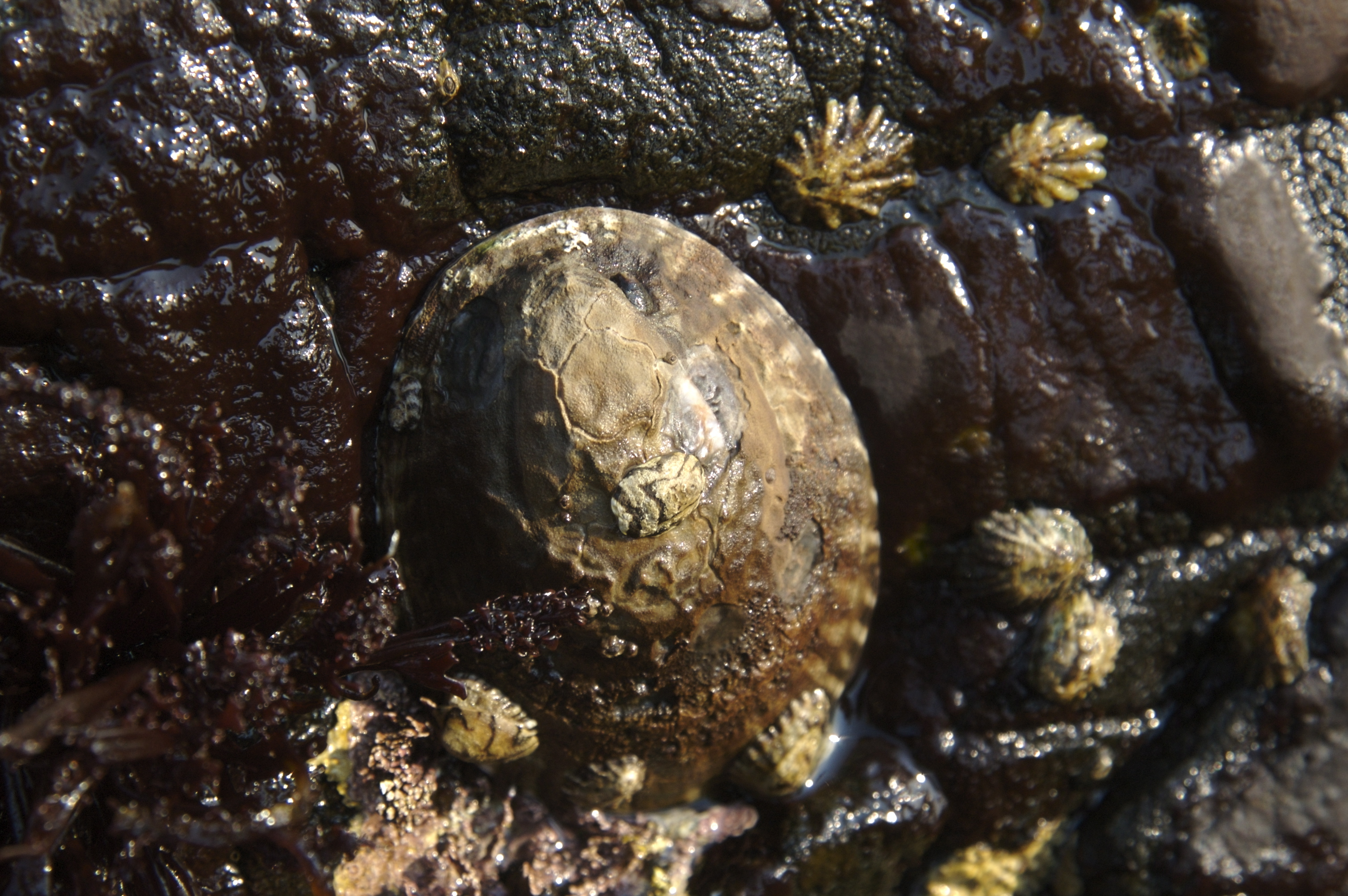

Scientific classification
- Kingdom: Animalia
- Phylum: Mollusca
- Class: Gastropoda
- Subclass: Patellogastropoda
- Family: Lottiidae
- Genus: Lottia
- Species: L. gigantea

Binomial name
- Lottia gigantea G. B. Sowerby I, 1834

= Lottia gigantea =

Species of gastropod

Lottia gigantea, common name the owl limpet, is a species of sea snail, a true limpet, a marine gastropod mollusc in the family Lottiidae. Its genome has been sequenced at the Joint Genome Institute.

== Distribution ==
The owl limpet is found on the Pacific coast of North America from northern California to southern Baja California.

== Description ==
The owl limpet grows to a length of up to nine centimetres. The often much eroded shell has an elongated low cone shape with the apex close to one end. The anterior slope is concave. The general colour is brownish grey with pale markings and the foot is pale grey with a yellow or orange sole. There is also a small form that lives on the shells of mussels. It is even more elongated, up to twenty-five millimetres long, and dark blue with concentric growth rings. Lottia gigantea present a muscular orange foot.

Round the edge of the foot the owl limpet has a distinctive pallial gill system which uses currents caused by the beating of cilia to circulate water over the gills when submerged.

== Ecology ==
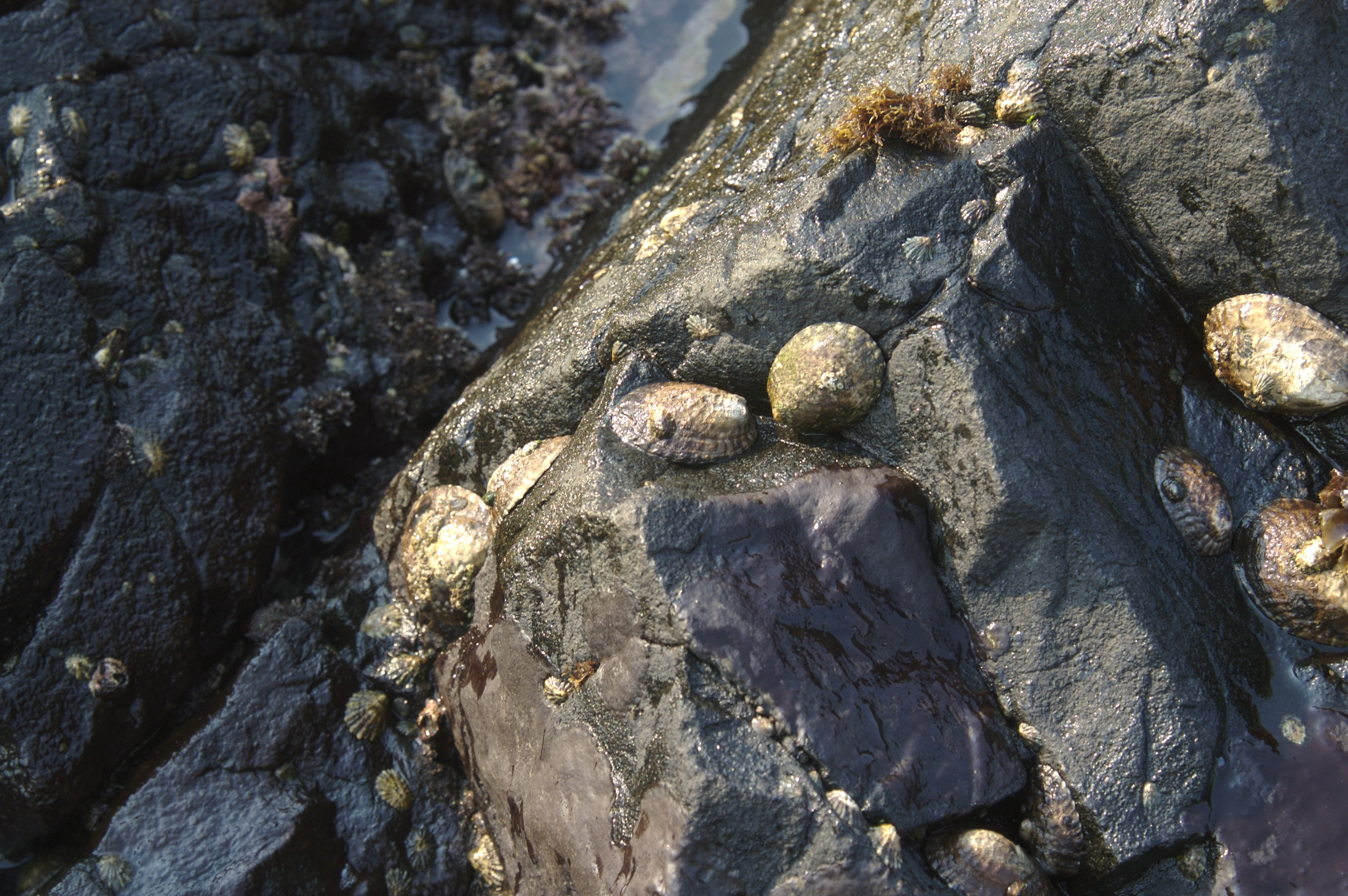
Habitat of Lottia gigantea

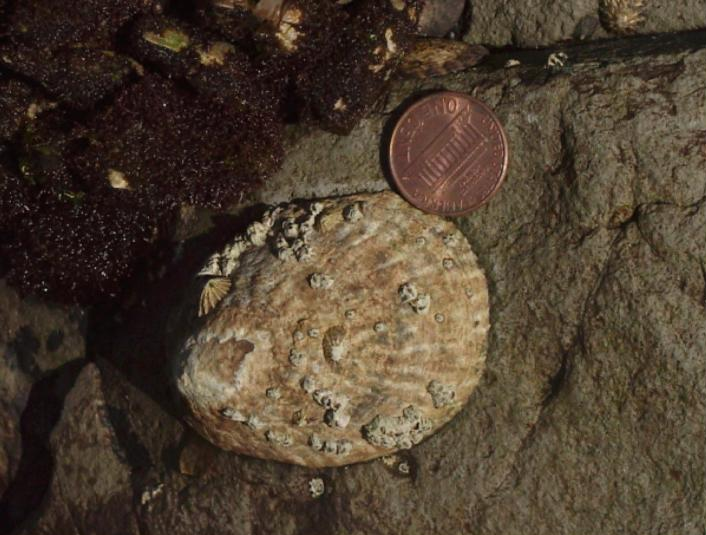
Lottia gigantea to scale (US penny), at Cabrillo National Monument. Smaller limpets and barnacles commonly grow on Owl Limpets, which grow slowly and may live for up to 20 years.

=== Habitat ===
It is most abundant in California and favours vertical rock faces in wave-swept areas in the upper littoral zone. It grows slowly and may live for up to twenty years. It browses on microalgae growing on rock surfaces.

The owl limpet is a territorial species and some individuals return to the same specific homesite every time the tide goes out. The limpet's contours grow to fit the homesite rock surface tightly.

=== Life cycle ===
Owl limpets are protandric hermaphrodites. They spend about two years as juveniles before starting their reproductive lives as male limpets. If they survive long enough, some of them later transform into females. Spawning takes place once a year in the winter. The larvae are pelagic and form part of the zooplankton. They may be transported large distances by currents before settling on suitable rock surfaces.

Larger individuals will themselves have encrusting animals such as barnacles and algae growing on their shells. Sometimes the shell will be used by other limpets or chitons for grazing on the microalgae that grows there. The black oystercatcher, Haematopus bachmani is the only known predator of the owl limpet but they are also harvested by humans for food.

=== Feeding habits ===
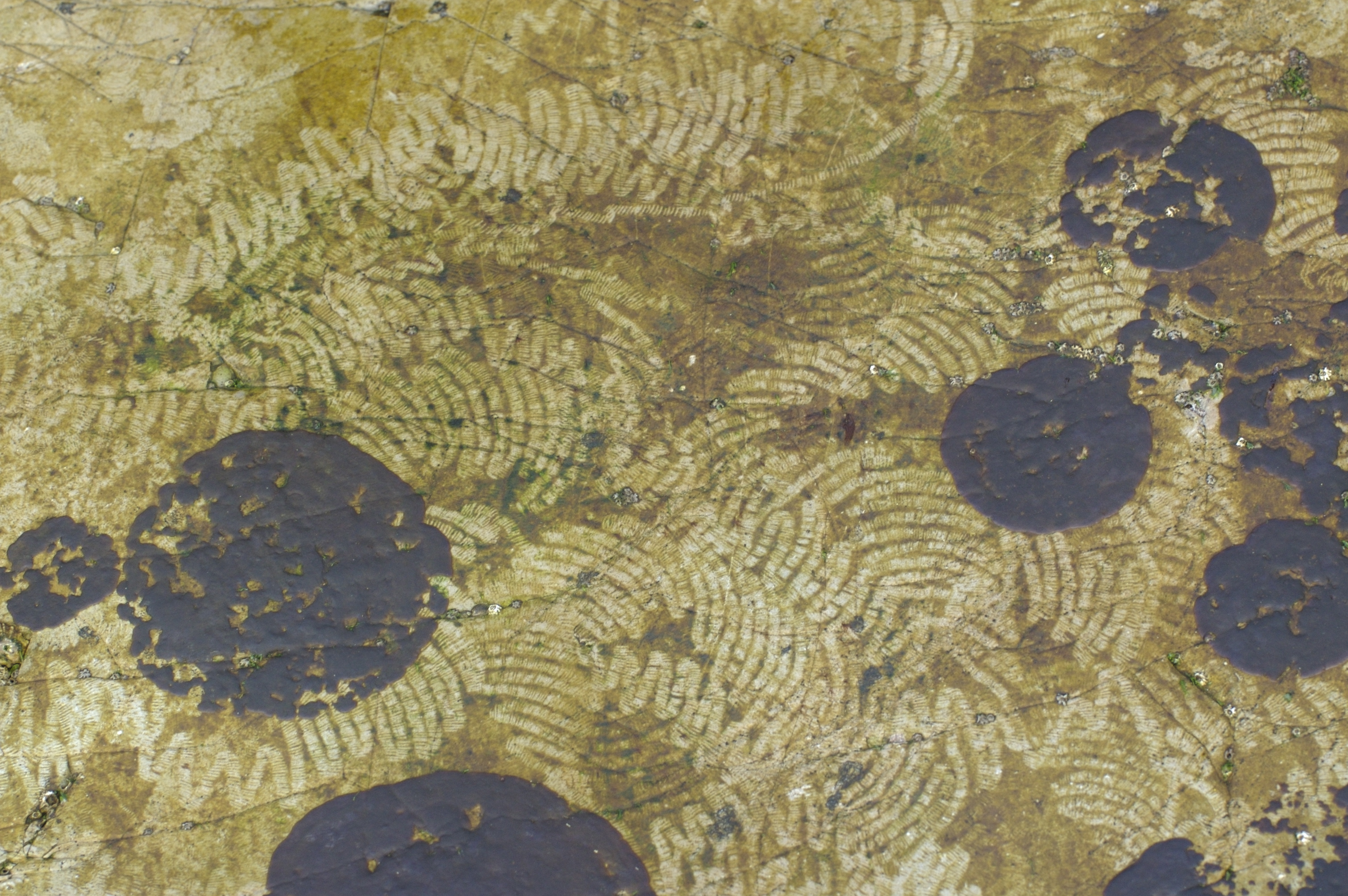
Feeding trails of Lottia gigantea show the marks left by the radula as the limpet scrapes algae off the rock surface

Large female limpets graze on the film of algae growing on rocks and defend their territory against other owl limpets, mobile gastropods, mussels, sea anemones, barnacles and macroalgae. Large competitors are dislodged by pushing them away with the anterior part of the shell, and if barnacles settle, they are rasped away with the radula. In this way, each individual maintains a territory of about 900 square centimetres. It selectively grazes its algal meadow maintaining a turf depth of at least one millimetre. In spring and summer, these green meadows are visible from fifteen metres away and if the owl limpet is transplanted to a new area, it establishes a new meadow over the course of about three weeks.
