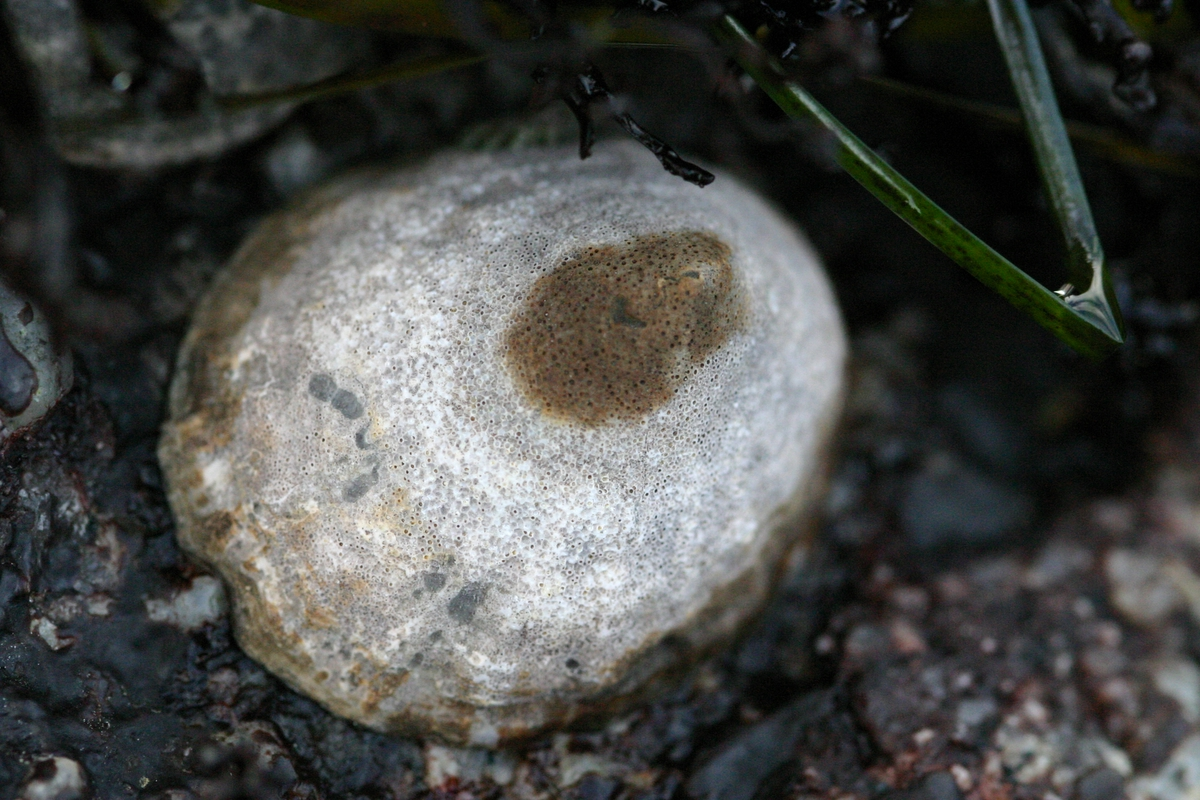
- A live individual of Lottia pelta

Scientific classification
- Kingdom: Animalia
- Phylum: Mollusca
- Class: Gastropoda
- Subclass: Patellogastropoda
- Superfamily: Lottioidea
- Family: Lottiidae; J. E. Gray, 1840

Genera
- See text

Synonyms
- Lottidae [sic]

= Lottiidae =

Family of gastropods

Lottiidae is a family of sea snails, specifically true limpets, marine gastropod mollusks in the superfamily Lottioidea and the clade Patellogastropoda (according to the taxonomy of the Gastropoda by Bouchet & Rocroi, 2005).

== Subfamilies ==
=== 2005 taxonomy ===
This family consists of the two following subfamilies (according to the taxonomy of the Gastropoda by Bouchet & Rocroi, 2005):

- Lottiinae Gray, 1840
  - tribe Lottiini Gray, 1840 - synonym: Tecturidae Gray, 1847
  - tribe Scurriini Lindberg, 1988
- Patelloidinae Chapman & Gabriel, 1923

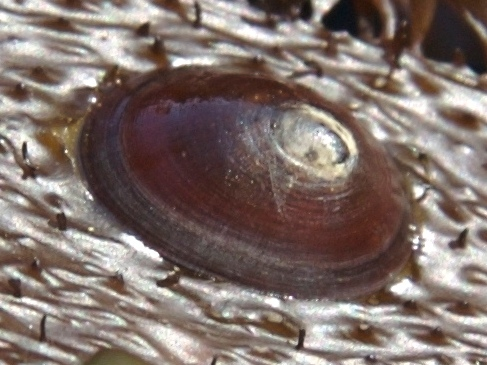
A live individual of Discurria insessa

=== 2007 taxonomy ===
Nakano & Ozawa (2007) made changes in taxonomy of Patellogastropoda based on molecular phylogeny research: Acmaeidae Forbes, 1850 is a synonym of Lottiidae and assigned genera Acmaea and Niveotectura into Lottiidae.

A cladogram showing phylogenic relations of Patellogastropoda:

- Patellogastropoda
  - - - Lottiidae (including Acmaea and Niveotectura)
      - - - Pectinodontidae
          - Lepetidae
        - Nacellidae
    - Patellidae
  - Eoacmaeidae

== Genera ==
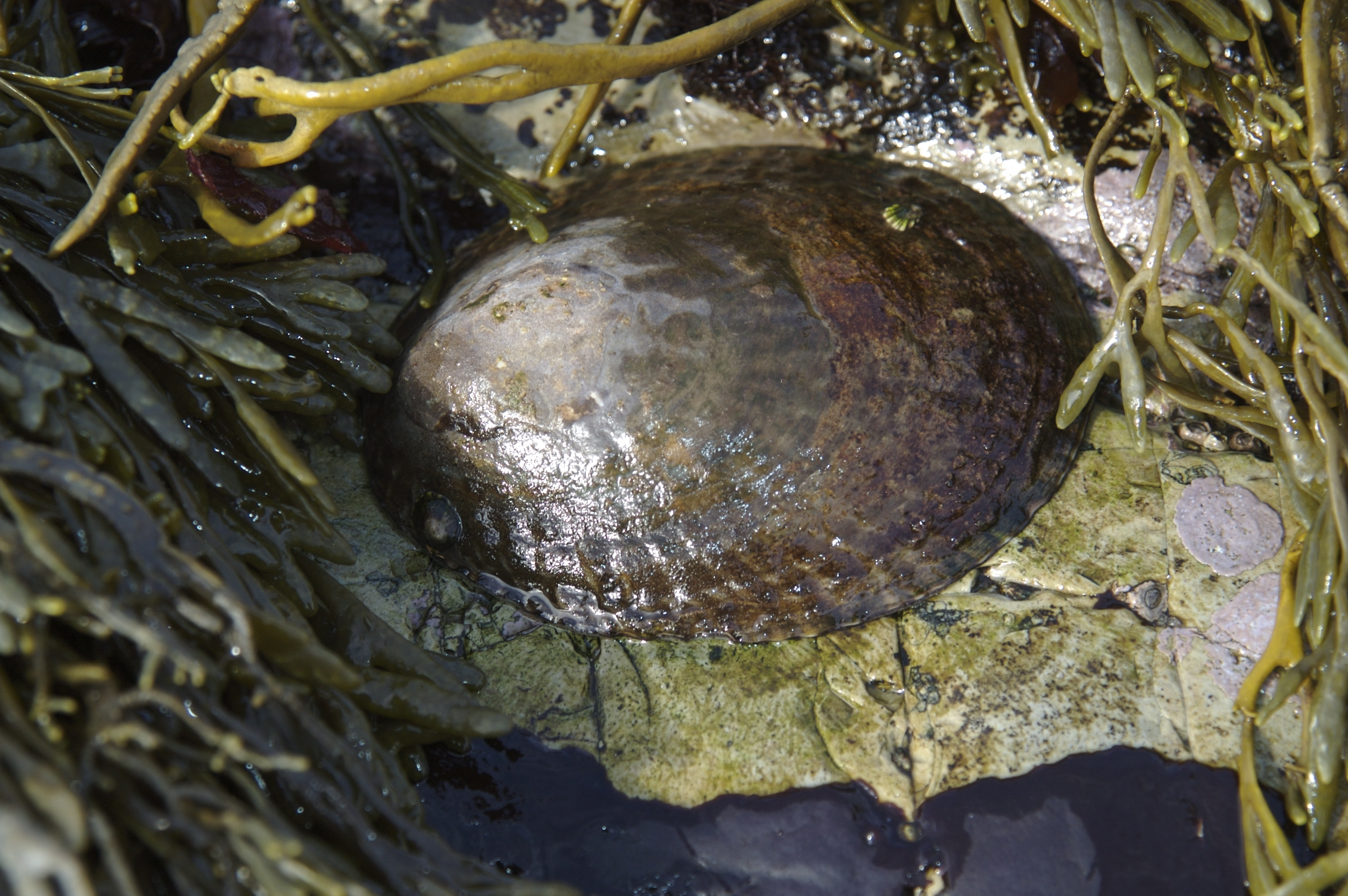
Lottia gigantea

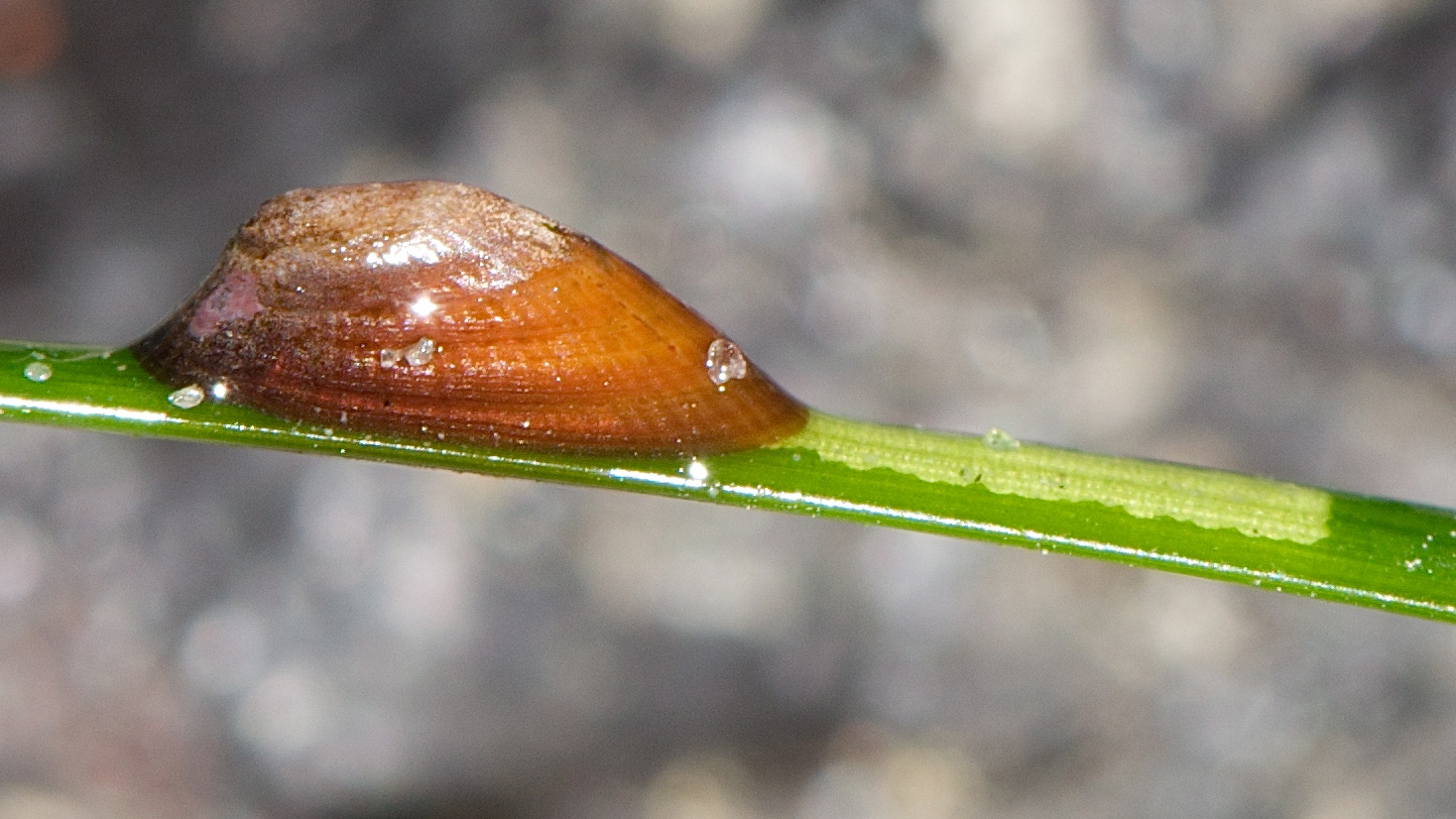
Tectura palacea feeding on the algal film on the surface of a blade of Phyllospadix

Genera within the family Lottiidae include:

Subfamily Lottiinae

- tribe Lottiini
  - Discurria Lindberg, 1988
  - Lottia Gray, 1833 - type species of the family Lottiidae
  - Notoacmea Iredale, 1915
  - Scurria Gray, 1847

Subfamily Patelloidinae Chapman & Gabriel, 1923

- Patelloida Quoy & Gaimard, 1834
- Collisella Dall, 1871: synonym of Lottia Gray, 1833

Subfamily Tecturinae Gray, 1847

- Tectura Gray, 1847

Subfamily incertae sedis

(Genera that were under Acmaeidae by Bouchet & Rocroi (2005) formerly in subfamily Rhodopetalinae):

- Actinoleuca Oliver, 1926
- Asteracmea Oliver, 1926
- Atalacmea Iredale, 1915
- † Boreoblinia O. Yu. Anistratenko, Burger & V. V. Anistratenko, 2010
- Nipponacmea Sasaki & Okutani, 1993
- Niveotectura Habe, 1944
- Potamacmaea Peile, 1922
- Radiacmea Iredale, 1915
- Testudinalia Moskalev, 1966
- Yayoiacmea Sasaki & Okutani, 1993
