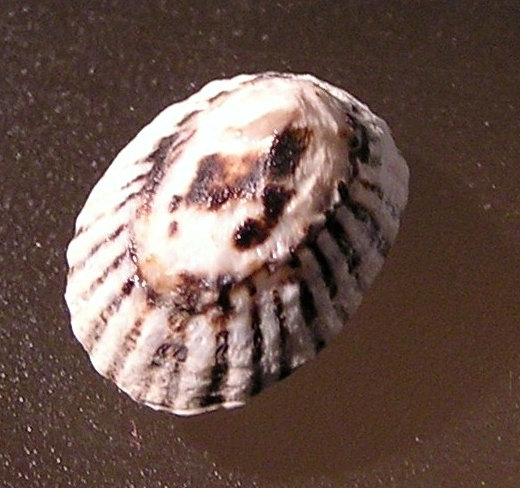
- A shell of Notoacmea scopulina

Scientific classification
- Kingdom: Animalia
- Phylum: Mollusca
- Class: Gastropoda
- Subclass: Patellogastropoda
- Family: Lottiidae
- Subfamily: Lottiinae
- Tribe: Lottiini
- Genus: Notoacmea; Iredale, 1915

Type species
- Patelloida pileopsis Quoy & Gaimard, 1834

Synonyms
- Conacmea Oliver, 1926; Notoacmea (Conacmea) W. R. B. Oliver, 1926; Notoacmea (Notoacmea) Iredale, 1915; Notoacmea (Subacmea) W. R. B. Oliver, 1926; Notoacmea (Parvacmea) Iredale, 1915; Notoacmea (Thalassacmea) W. R. B. Oliver, 1926; Parvacmea Iredale, 1915; Subacmea Oliver, 1926; Thalassacmea Oliver, 1926

= Notoacmea =

Genus of gastropods

Notoacmea is a southern genus of true limpets, marine gastropod molluscs in the subfamily Lottiinae of the family Lottiidae, the true limpets.

== Species ==
According to the World Register of Marine Species (WoRMS), the following species with accepted names are species within the genus Notoacmaea:

- Notoacmea alta Oliver, 1926
- Notoacmea badia (Oliver, 1926)
- Notoacmea biradiata (Reeve, 1855)
- Notoacmea cellanoides Oliver, 1926
- † Notoacmea chattonensis Laws, 1932
- Notoacmea conoidea (Quoy & Gaimard, 1834)
- Notoacmea corrodenda (May, 1920)
- Notoacmea daedala (Suter, 1907)
- Notoacmea elongata (Quoy & Gaimard, 1834)
- Notoacmea flammea (Quoy & Gaimard, 1834)
- Notoacmea mayi (May, 1923)
- † Notoacmea nukumaruensis W. R. B. Oliver, 1926
- † Notoacmea otahuhuensis Laws, 1950
- Notoacmea parviconoidea (Suter, 1907)
- Notoacmea petterdi (Tenison-Woods, 1876)
- Notoacmea pileopsis (Quoy & Gaimard, 1834) - black edged limpet
- Notoacmea potae Nakano, Marshall, Kennedy & Spencer, 2009
- Notoacmea rapida Nakano, Marshall, Kennedy & Spencer, 2009
- Notoacmea scapha (Suter, 1907)
- Notoacmea scopulina Oliver, 1926
- Notoacmea sturnus (Hombron & Jacquinot, 1841)
- Notoacmea subantarctica Oliver, 1926
- Notoacmea subtilis (Suter, 1907)
- Notoacmea turbatrix Nakano, Marshall, Kennedy & Spencer, 2009

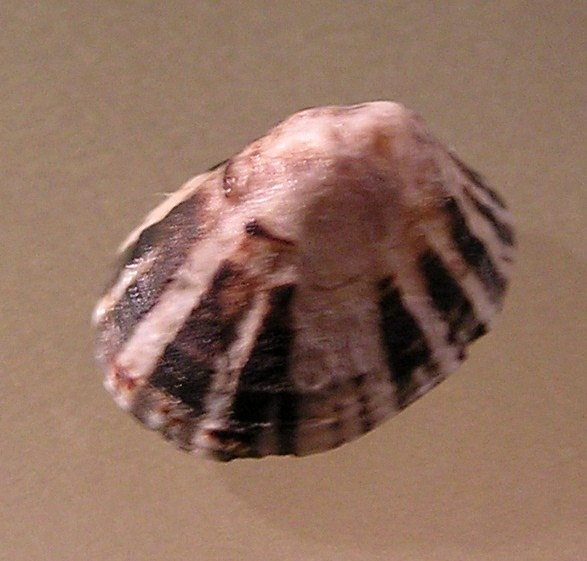
A shell of Notoacmea mayi

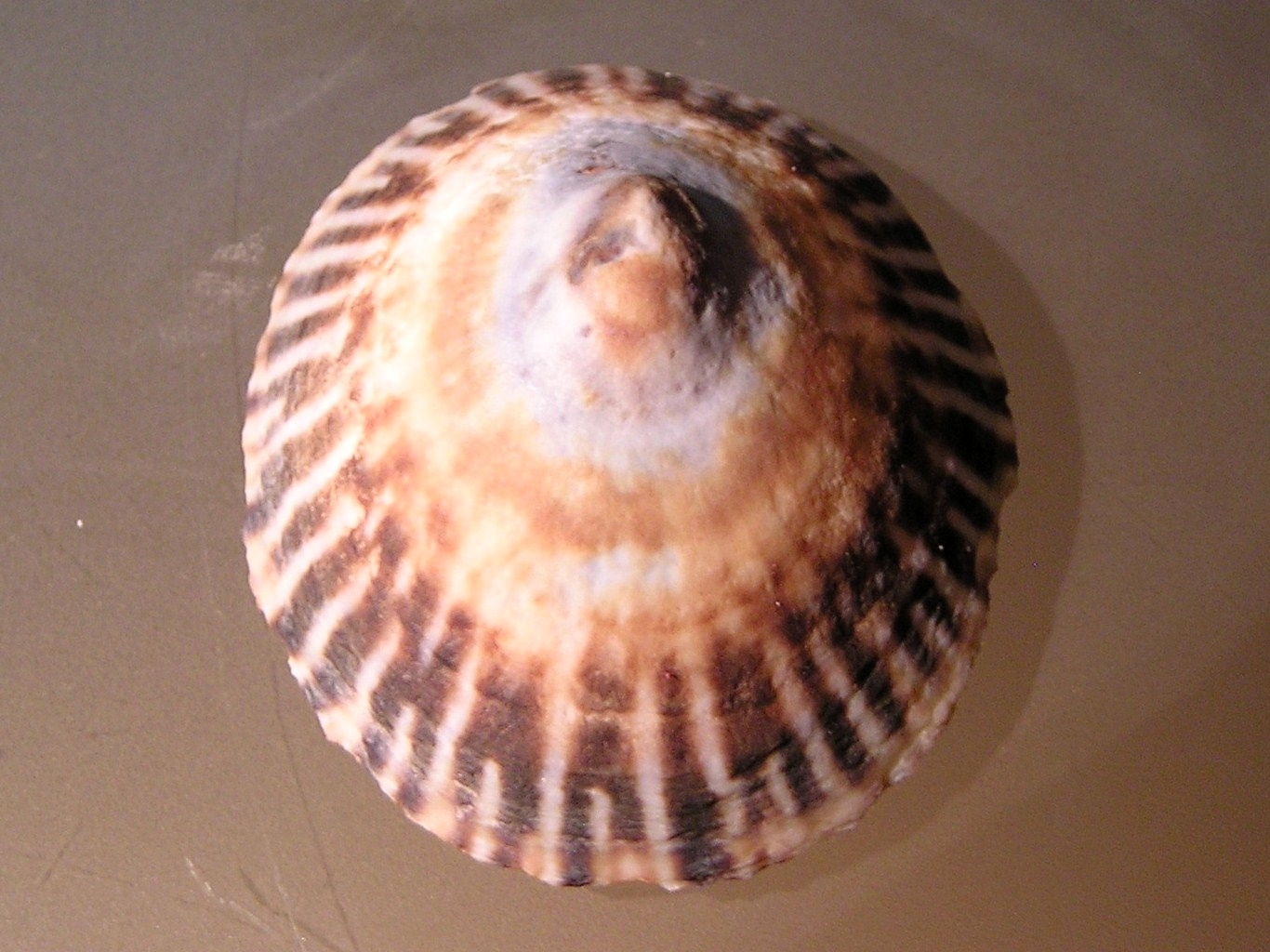
A shell of Notoacmea persona

The following list comes from Powell New Zealand Mollusca:

- Notoacmea insessa - seaweed limpet: synonym of Discurria insessa (Hinds, 1842)
- Notoacmea paleacea - surfgrass limpet
- Notoacmea persona - mask limpet: synonym of Lottia persona (J. Rathke, 1833)

Species brought into synonymy

- Notoacmea concinna (Lischke, 1870): synonym of Nipponacmea concinna (Lischke, 1870)
- Notoacmea corrosa W. R. B. Oliver, 1926: synonym of Notoacmea alta W. R. B. Oliver, 1926 (junior synonym)
- Notoacmea daedala Oliver, 1926: synonym of Notoacmea elongata (Quoy & Gaimard, 1834)
- Notoacmea daedala Iredale, 1915: synonym of Notoacmea daedala (Suter, 1907)
- Notoacmea depicta (Hinds, 1842): synonym of Tectura depicta (Hinds, 1842)
- Notoacmea elongata Ponder & Creese, 1980: synonym of Notoacmea daedala (Suter, 1907)
- Notoacmea explorata Dell, 1953: synonym of Maoricrater explorata (Dell, 1953)
- Notoacmea fascicularis (Menke, 1851): synonym of Lottia fascicularis (Menke, 1851)
- Notoacmea fenestrata (Reeve, 1855): synonym of Lottia fenestrata (Reeve, 1855)
- Notoacmea filosa (Carpenter, 1865): synonym of Lottia filosa (Carpenter, 1865)
- Notoacmea fuscoviridis Teramachi, 1949: synonym of Nipponacmea fuscoviridis (Teramachi, 1949) (original combination)
- Notoacmea granulosa Macpherson, 1955: synonym of Notoacmea flammea (Quoy & Gaimard, 1834) (junior synonym)
- Notoacmea helmsi Iredale, 1915: synonym of Notoacmea elongata (Quoy & Gaimard, 1834)
- Notoacmea inconspicua (Gray in Dieffenbach, 1843): synonym of Radiacmea inconspicua (Gray in Dieffenbach, 1843)
- Notoacmea insessa (Hinds, 1842): synonym of Discurria insessa (Hinds, 1842)
- Notoacmea mixta (Reeve, 1855): synonym of Patelloida flammea Quoy & Gaimard, 1834: synonym of Notoacmea flammea (Quoy & Gaimard, 1834)
- Notoacmea nigrans Kira, 1961: synonym of Nipponacmea nigrans (Kira, 1961) (original combination)
- Notoacmea pumila Lindberg & McLean, 1981: synonym of Tectura pumila (Lindberg & McLean, 1981)
- Notoacmea radula Kira, 1961: synonym of Nipponacmea radula (Kira, 1961) (original combination)
- Notoacmea rothi Lindberg & McLean, 1981: synonym of Lottia rothi (Lindberg & McLean, 1981)
- Notoacmea schrenckii (Lischke, 1868): synonym of Nipponacmea schrenckii (Lischke, 1868)
- Notoacmea scutum (Rathke, 1833): synonym of Lottia scutum (Rathke, 1833)
- Notoacmea septiformis Quoy & Gaimard, 1834: synonym of Lottia septiformis (Quoy & Gaimard, 1834) (original combination)
- Notoacmea suteri Iredale, 1915: synonym of Asteracmea suteri (Iredale, 1915)
- Notoacmea teramachii Kira, 1961: synonym of Nipponacmea teramachii (Kira, 1961) (original combination)
- Notoacmea testudinalis (O. F. Müller, 1776): synonym of Testudinalia testudinalis (O. F. Müller, 1776)
- Notoacmea ubiquita Lindberg & McLean, 1981: synonym of Tectura ubiquita (Lindberg & McLean, 1981)
- Notoacmea virescens Oliver, 1926: synonym of Notoacmea elongata (Quoy & Gaimard, 1834)
