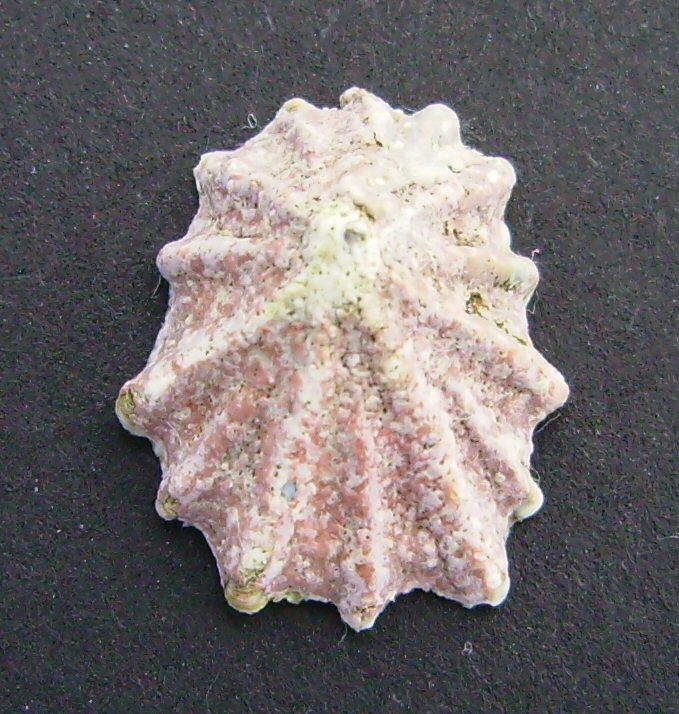
- Dorsal view of a shell of Patelloida corticata

Scientific classification
- Kingdom: Animalia
- Phylum: Mollusca
- Class: Gastropoda
- Subclass: Patellogastropoda
- Family: Lottiidae
- Subfamily: Lottiinae
- Tribe: Patelloidini
- Genus: Patelloida; Quoy & Gaimard, 1834

Type species
- Patelloida rugosa Quoy & Gaimard, 1834

Synonyms
- Acmaea (Chiazacmea); Chiazacmea Oliver, 1926; Collisella (Conoidacmea) Habe, 1944 (original rank); Collisellina Dall, 1871; Patelloidea [sic] (incorrect subsequent spelling [by Couthouy, 1839] of Patelloida Quoy & Gaimard, 1834 ); Patelloides Hombron & Jacquinot, 1841 (misspelling)

= Patelloida =

Genus of gastropods

Patelloida is a genus of sea snails or true limpets, marine gastropod molluscs in the subfamily Lottiinae of the family Lottiidae, one of the families of true limpets.

(This genus name should not be confused with the similar-sounding true limpet superfamily Patelloidea, which is also part of the Patellogastropoda).

== Species ==
Species within the genus Patelloida include according to the World Register of Marine Species (WoRMS)

- Patelloida alticostata (Angas, 1865)
- Patelloida bellatula (Iredale, 1929)
- Patelloida chamorrorum Lindberg & Vermeij, 1985
- Patelloida conulus (Dunker, 1861)
- Patelloida corticata (Hutton, 1880)
- Patelloida cryptalirata (Macpherson, 1955)
- Patelloida exilis (Philippi, 1846)
- Patelloida garrettii (Pilsbry, 1891)
- Patelloida garuda Nakano & Aswan, 2008
- Patelloida heroldi (Dunker, 1861)
- Patelloida heteromorpha (Oliver, 1926)
- Patelloida inquilinus (Preston, 1913)
- Patelloida insignis (Menke, 1843)
- Patelloida latistrigata (Angas, 1865)
- Patelloida lentiginosa (Reeve, 1855)
- Patelloida lineata (Philippi, 1846)
- Patelloida mimula (Iredale, 1924)
- Patelloida mufria (Hedley, 1915)
- Patelloida nigrosulcata (Reeve, 1855)
- Patelloida orbicularis J.R.C. Quoy & J.P. Gaimard, 1834
- Patelloida perconica (Preston, 1913)
- Patelloida pseudopygmaea Nakano & Aswan, 2008
- Patelloida pygmaea (Dunker, 1860)
- Patelloida rolani Christiaens, 1987
- Patelloida rugosa Quoy & Gaimard, 1834
- Patelloida ryukyuensis Nakano & Ozawa, 2005
- Patelloida saccharina (Linnaeus, 1758)
  - Patelloida saccharina lanx (Reeve, 1855)
  - Patelloida saccharina saccharina (Linnaeus, 1758)
  - Patelloida saccharina stella (Lesson, 1830 in 1826-32)
- Patelloida saccharinoides Habe & Kosuge, 1996
- Patelloida signata (Pilsbry, 1901)
- Patelloida squamosa J.R.C. Quoy & J.P. Gaimard, 1834
- Patelloida stellaris J.R.C. Quoy & J.P. Gaimard, 1834
- Patelloida striata (Quoy & Gaimard, 1834)
- Patelloida toloensis Christiaens, 1977
- Patelloida victoriana (Singleton, 1937)

Taxon inquirendum

- Patelloida victoriae (Gatliff & Gabriel, 1922)

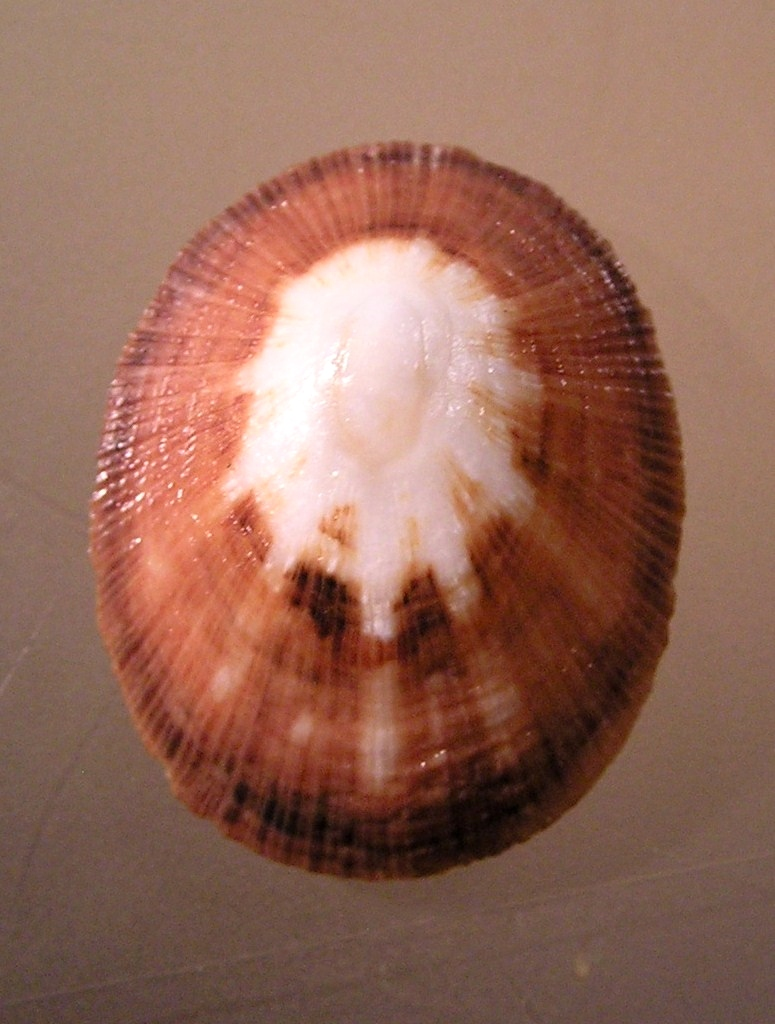
Shell of Patelloida victoriana

Species brought into synonymy

- Patelloida ceciliana (Powell, 1951): synonym of Scurria ceciliana (d'Orbigny, 1841)
- Patelloida conoidalis (Pease, 1868): synonym of Eoacmaea conoidalis (Pease, 1868)
- Patelloida conoidea Quoy & Gaimard, 1834: synonym of Notoacmea conoidea (Quoy & Gaimard, 1834)
- Patelloida corrodenda May, 1920: synonym of Notoacmea corrodenda (May, 1920) (original combination)
- Patelloida depicta Hinds, 1842: synonym of Tectura depicta (Hinds, 1842)
- Patelloida elongata Quoy & Gaimard, 1834: synonym of Notoacmea elongata (Quoy & Gaimard, 1834)
- Patelloida flammea Quoy & Gaimard, 1834: synonym of Notoacmea flammea (Quoy & Gaimard, 1834)
- Patelloida inconspicua (Gray, 1843): synonym of Radiacmea inconspicua (J.E. Gray, 1843)
- Patelloida javanica Nakano, Aswan & Ozawa, 2005: synonym of Eoacmaea javanica (Nakano, Aswan & Ozawa, 2005)
- Patelloida lampanicola Habe, 1944: synonym of Patelloida conulus (Dunker, 1861)
- Patelloida maraisi (Kilburn, 1977): synonym of Asteracmea maraisi (Kilburn, 1977) (superseded combination)
- Patelloida mayi May, 1923: synonym of Notoacmea mayi (May, 1923) (original combination)
- Patelloida perfestiva Faber, 2004: synonym of Eoacmaea perfestiva (Faber, 2004)
- Patelloida pileopsis Quoy & Gaimard, 1834: synonym of Notoacmea pileopsis (Quoy & Gaimard, 1834) (original combination)
- Patelloida profunda (Deshayes, 1863): synonym of Eoacmaea profunda (Deshayes, 1863)
- Patelloida punctata Quoy & Gaimard, 1834: synonym of Naccula punctata (Quoy & Gaimard, 1834)
- Patelloida pustulata (Helbling, 1779): synonym of Eoacmaea pustulata (Helbling, 1779)
- Patelloida septiformis Quoy & Gaimard, 1834: synonym of Lottia septiformis (Quoy & Gaimard, 1834) (original combination)
- Patelloida signatoides (Kuroda & Habe, 1971): synonym of Patelloida signata (Pilsbry, 1901)
