= R. intermedia =

R. intermedia may refer to:

- Radiacmea intermedia, a small sea snail species
- Raphidiophrys intermedia, a protist species in the genus Raphidiophrys
- Raphitoma intermedia, a sea snail species
- Rhabdomastix intermedia, a crane fly species in the genus Rhabdomastix
- Rosenscheldiella intermedia, a fungus species

== See also ==
- Intermedia (disambiguation)
