= N. concinna =

N. concinna may refer to:

- Nacella concinna, a sea snail
- Narosa concinna, a cup moth
- Neoleptoneta concinna, a haplogyne spider
- Nipponacmea concinna, a sea snail
- Nola concinna, a tuft moth
- Notoacmea concinna, a true limpet
- Nyssodectes concinna, a longhorn beetle
