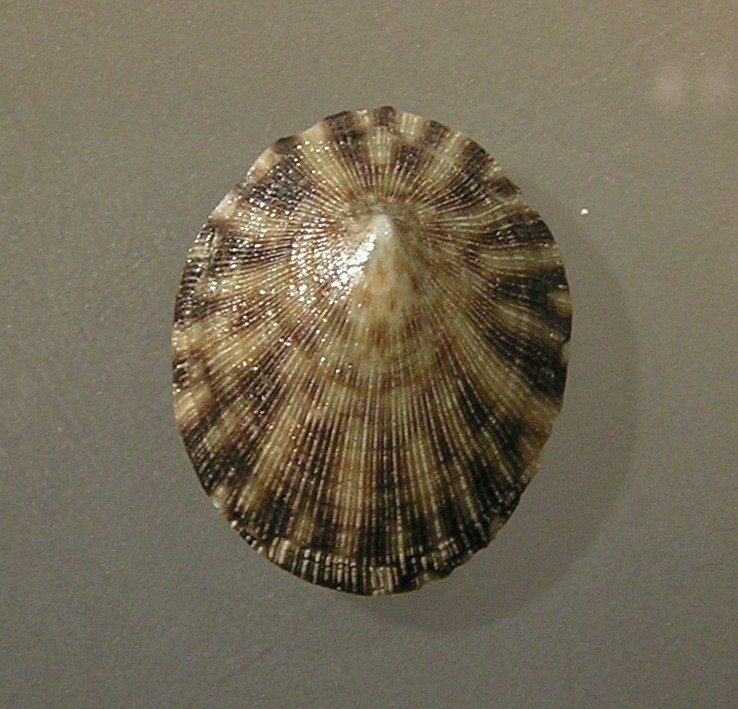
- Nipponacmea fuscoviridis

Scientific classification
- Kingdom: Animalia
- Phylum: Mollusca
- Class: Gastropoda
- Subclass: Patellogastropoda
- Superfamily: Lottioidea
- Family: Lottiidae
- Genus: Nipponacmea; Sasaki & Okutani, 1993

Type species
- Patella schrenkii Lischke, 1868

= Nipponacmea =

Genus of gastropods

Nipponacmea is a genus of sea snails, the true limpets, marine gastropod mollusks in the family Lottiidae.

== Distribution and habitat ==
These species are very common among the Japanese gastropod fauna on rocks and boulders in the intertidal zone of Japanese waters and adjacent islands.

== Description ==
The shape of the thin shell is limpet-like or patelliform. It has a medium size and has a low to medium height. The base (the aperture) has an oval shape and is longer than wide.

The color of the shell is greenish brown and characteristically bedecked with granules of fine radial riblets. . The interior is greenish blue and has a shining luster. The thin and broad interior shell margin exhibits a distinct color and texture from the adjoining area.

The shell is constituted of five layers of different structure, while the genus Notoacmea has six layers.

The gill is flaplike with a bipectinate ctenidium situated in the nuchal cavity and lacks secondary pallial gills. The radula has typically three pairs of lateral teeth and one pair of marginal teeth that is either lacks any function or is degenerated with growth or is lacking from the beginning.

== Species ==
Until 1993 the species of these Japanese limpets were allocated in the genus Notoacmea. They were reassigned based on different anatomical characters and shell structure and their endemism to the Japonic zoogeographical province (Japanese waters and adjacent island chains). There wasn't just enough similarity with the New Zealand species from Notoacmea. Also the radula characters were different. Lindberg (in 1986) had pointed out that the genus Notoacmea was restricted to species from New Zealand and Australia and that the North American species belonged in Tectura. The eight Japanese species had been unsettled until this study. Some authors consider them color variations, others regard them as subspecies or as independent species.

Species within the genus Nipponacmea include:

- Nipponacmea concinna (Lischke, 1870)
- Nipponacmea fuscoviridis (Teramachi, 1949)
- Nipponacmea gloriosa (Habe, 1944)
- Nipponacmea habei (Saski & Okutani, 1994)
- Nipponacmea moskalevi Chernyshev & Chernova, 2002
- Nipponacmea nigrans (Kira, 1961)
- Nipponacmea radula (Kira, 1961)
- Nipponacmea schrenckii (Lischke, 1868)
- Nipponacmea teramachii (Kira, 1961)
- Nipponacmea vietnamensis Chernyshev, 2008
