= Notoacmea potae =

Scientific classification
- Kingdom: Animalia
- Phylum: Mollusca
- Class: Gastropoda
- Subclass: Patellogastropoda
- Family: Lottiidae
- Genus: Notoacmea
- Species: N. potae

Binomial name
- Notoacmea potae Nakano, Marshall, Kennedy & Spencer, 2009

Species of gastropod

Notoacmea potae is a species of sea snail, a true limpet, a marine gastropod mollusk in the family Lottiidae, one of the families of true limpets. It was first identified using DNA sequence analysis in 2009.

== Description ==
This species, like other true limpets, has a fleshy body and hard, protective shell. The shell of N. potae is approximately 8.80 mm long, with a height 40% of its length. The shell has a radial color pattern, with differing shades of cream and dark brown.

== Distribution ==
N. potae has been discovered in shallow coastal inlets across both the north and south islands of New Zealand.
