= Asteracmea =

Scientific classification
- Kingdom: Animalia
- Phylum: Mollusca
- Class: Gastropoda
- Subclass: Patellogastropoda
- Superfamily: Lottioidea
- Family: Lottiidae
- Genus: Asteracmea; Oliver, 1926

Species
- See text.

Genus of gastropods

Asteracmea is a genus of true limpets, marine gastropod molluscs in the family Lottiidae.

== Species ==
- Asteracmea axiaerata
- Asteracmea illibrata (J. C. Verco, 1906)
- Asteracmea roseoradiata (J. C. Verco, 1912)
- Asteracmea stowae
- Asteracmea suteri (Iredale, 1915)
