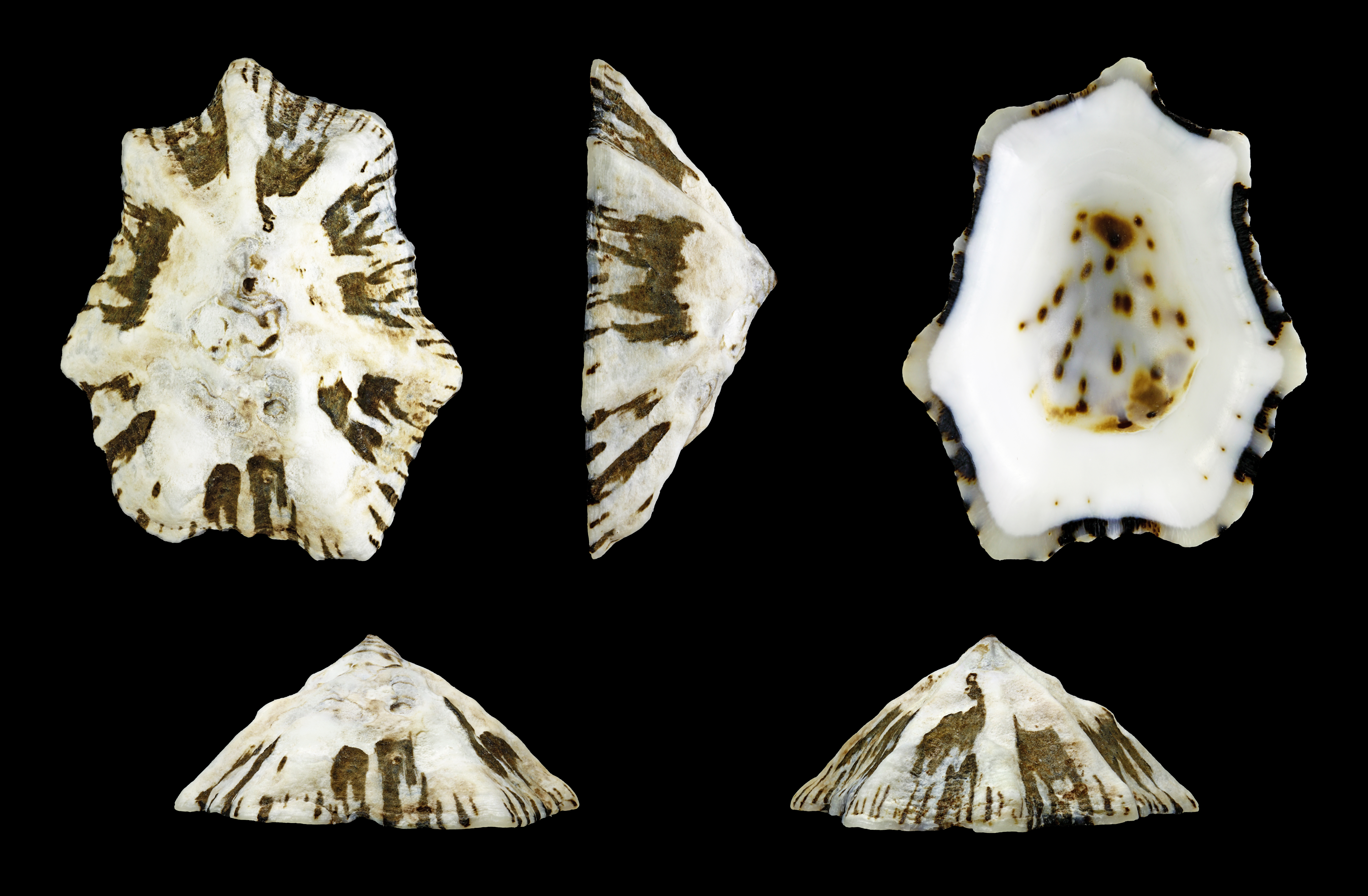

Scientific classification
- Kingdom: Animalia
- Phylum: Mollusca
- Class: Gastropoda
- Subclass: Patellogastropoda
- Family: Lottiidae
- Genus: Patelloida
- Species: P. saccharina

Binomial name
- Patelloida saccharina (Linnaeus, 1758)

Synonyms
- Acmaea saccharina (Linnaeus, 1758); Patelloida stellaris Quoy, H.E.T. & J.P. Gaimard, 1834

= Patelloida saccharina =

Species of mollusc

Patelloida saccharina, common name the broad-ribbed limpet, is a species of sea snail, a true limpet, a marine gastropod mollusc in the family Lottiidae, one of the families of true limpets.

== Subspecies ==
- Patelloida saccharina lanx (Reeve, 1855)
- Patelloida saccharina stella (Lesson, 1831)

== Description ==
The size of the shell varies between 15 mm and 50 mm.

== Distribution ==
This species occurs in the Red Sea, off Tanzania and Madagascar; off Japan and Australia (Northern Territory, Queensland, Western Australia)
