= Nyssodectes veracruzi =

Scientific classification
- Kingdom: Animalia
- Phylum: Arthropoda
- Class: Insecta
- Order: Coleoptera
- Suborder: Polyphaga
- Infraorder: Cucujiformia
- Family: Cerambycidae
- Genus: Nyssodectes
- Species: N. veracruzi

Binomial name
- Nyssodectes veracruzi Dillon, 1955

Species of beetle

Nyssodectes veracruzi is a species of beetle in the family Cerambycidae. It was described by Dillon in 1955.
