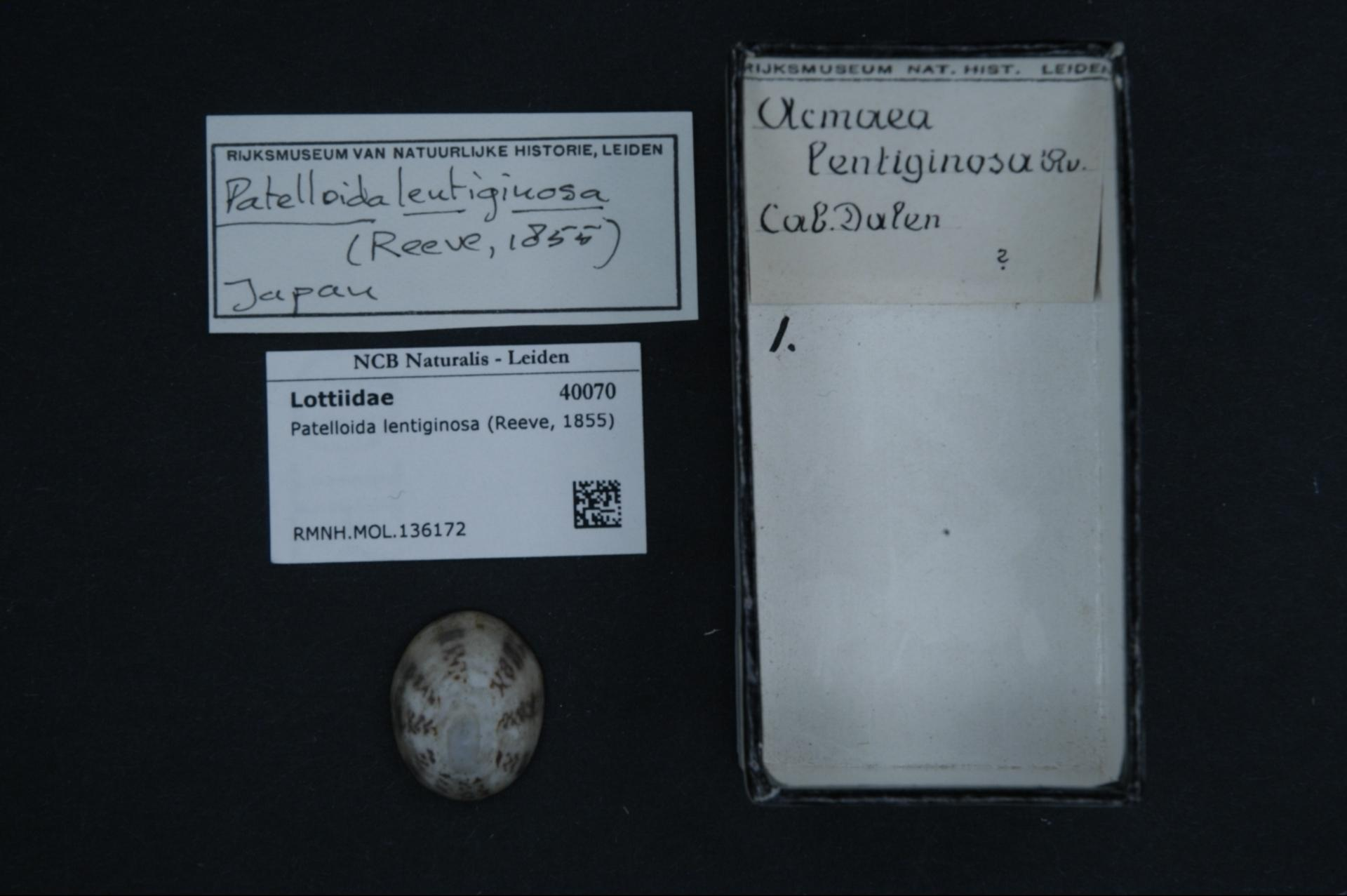

Scientific classification
- Kingdom: Animalia
- Phylum: Mollusca
- Class: Gastropoda
- Subclass: Patellogastropoda
- Family: Lottiidae
- Genus: Patelloida
- Species: P. lentiginosa

Binomial name
- Patelloida lentiginosa (Reeve, 1855)

= Patelloida lentiginosa =

Species of gastropod

Patelloida lentiginosa is a species of sea snail, a true limpet, a marine gastropod mollusc in the family Lottiidae, one of the families of true limpets.
