= Notoacmea parviconoidea =

Scientific classification
- Kingdom: Animalia
- Phylum: Mollusca
- Class: Gastropoda
- Subclass: Patellogastropoda
- Family: Lottiidae
- Genus: Notoacmea
- Species: N. parviconoidea

Binomial name
- Notoacmea parviconoidea (Suter, 1907)

Species of gastropod

Notoacmea parviconoidea is a species of sea snail, a true limpet, a marine gastropod mollusk in the family Lottiidae, one of the families of true limpets.
