= Nyssodectes =

Scientific classification
- Kingdom: Animalia
- Phylum: Arthropoda
- Class: Insecta
- Order: Coleoptera
- Suborder: Polyphaga
- Infraorder: Cucujiformia
- Family: Cerambycidae
- Tribe: Acanthocinini
- Genus: Nyssodectes

Genus of beetles

Nyssodectes is a genus of beetles in the family Cerambycidae, containing the following species:

- Nyssodectes bispecularis (White, 1855)
- Nyssodectes concinna (Bates, 1885)
- Nyssodectes dulcissimus (Bates, 1863)
- Nyssodectes longula (Bates, 1881)
- Nyssodectes roseicollis (Bates, 1872)
- Nyssodectes veracruzi Dillon, 1955
