= Notoacmea badia =

Scientific classification
- Kingdom: Animalia
- Phylum: Mollusca
- Class: Gastropoda
- Subclass: Patellogastropoda
- Family: Lottiidae
- Genus: Notoacmea
- Species: N. badia

Binomial name
- Notoacmea badia Oliver, 1926

Species of gastropod

Notoacmea badia is a species of sea snail or true limpet, a marine gastropod mollusc in the family Lottiidae, one of the families of true limpets.
