= Nyssodectes dulcissimus =

Scientific classification
- Kingdom: Animalia
- Phylum: Arthropoda
- Class: Insecta
- Order: Coleoptera
- Suborder: Polyphaga
- Infraorder: Cucujiformia
- Family: Cerambycidae
- Genus: Nyssodectes
- Species: N. dulcissimus

Binomial name
- Nyssodectes dulcissimus (Bates, 1863)

Species of beetle

Nyssodectes dulcissimus is a species of beetle in the family Cerambycidae. It was described by Bates in 1863.
