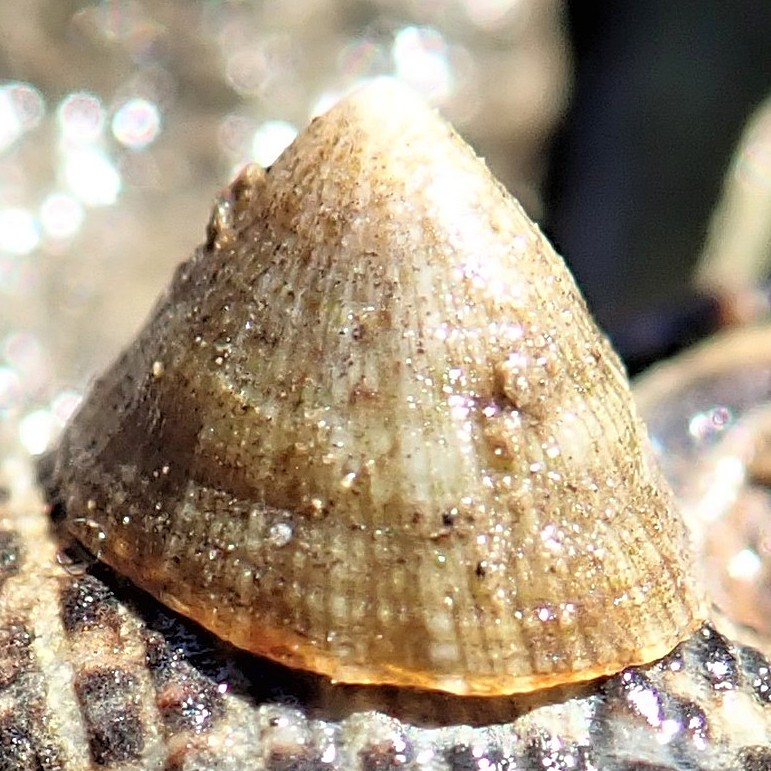

Scientific classification
- Kingdom: Animalia
- Phylum: Mollusca
- Class: Gastropoda
- Subclass: Patellogastropoda
- Family: Lottiidae
- Genus: Patelloida
- Species: P. conulus

Binomial name
- Patelloida conulus (Dunker, 1861)

Synonyms
- Patelloida pygmaea forma conulus （Dunker, 1861）; Patelloida lampanicola Habe, 1944; Patelloida pygmaea lampanicola Habe, 1944; Chiazacmaea pygmaea lampanicola (Habe)

= Patelloida conulus =

Species of gastropod

Patelloida conulus is a species of sea snail, a true limpet, a marine gastropod mollusc in the family Lottiidae, one of the families of true limpets.

== Description ==
Length of shell is 4.9 millimetres (0.19 in)

== Distribution ==
Distributed in East Asia region, from the northeast at South Korea, down to the Taiwan and Kinmen (Quemoy) around the Taiwan Strait and also in Hong Kong.

The shell lives in intertidal area, sometimes attached to sand basal or on top of rocks or shells inside calm sea bay.
