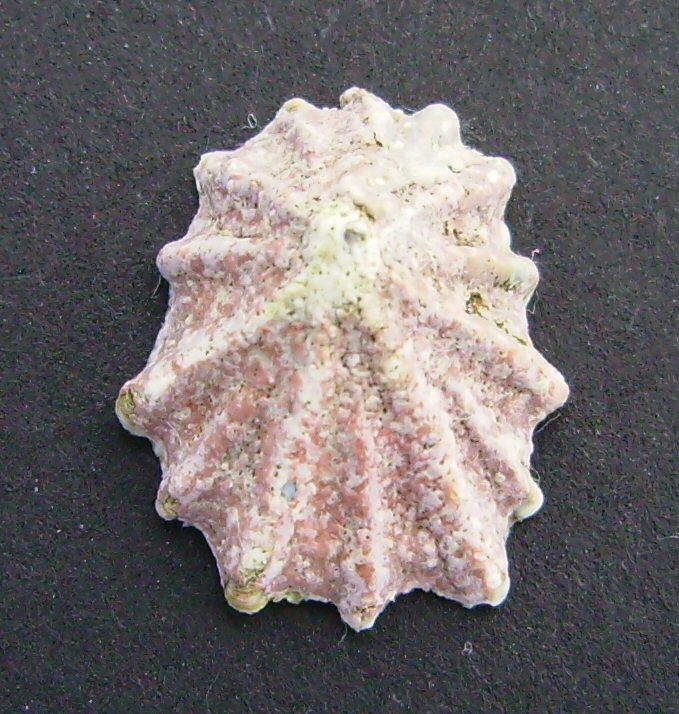
- Dorsal view of the shell of Patelloida corticata

Scientific classification
- Kingdom: Animalia
- Phylum: Mollusca
- Class: Gastropoda
- Subclass: Patellogastropoda
- Family: Lottiidae
- Genus: Patelloida
- Species: P. corticata

Binomial name
- Patelloida corticata (Hutton, 1880)

Synonyms
- Acmaea corticata Hutton, 1880; Acmaea lacunosa Pilsbry, 1891; Acmaea stella Suter, 1907; Acmaea pseudocorticata Iredale, 1908; Patelloida corticata corallina Oliver, 1926

= Patelloida corticata =

Species of gastropod

Patelloida corticata is a species of sea snail or true limpet, a marine gastropod mollusc in the family Lottiidae, the lottia limpets.

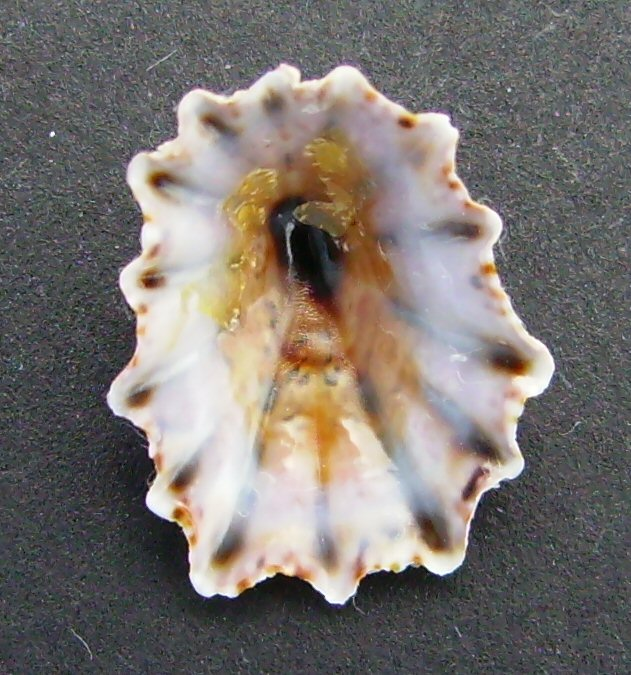
Ventral view of the shell of Patelloida corticata.
