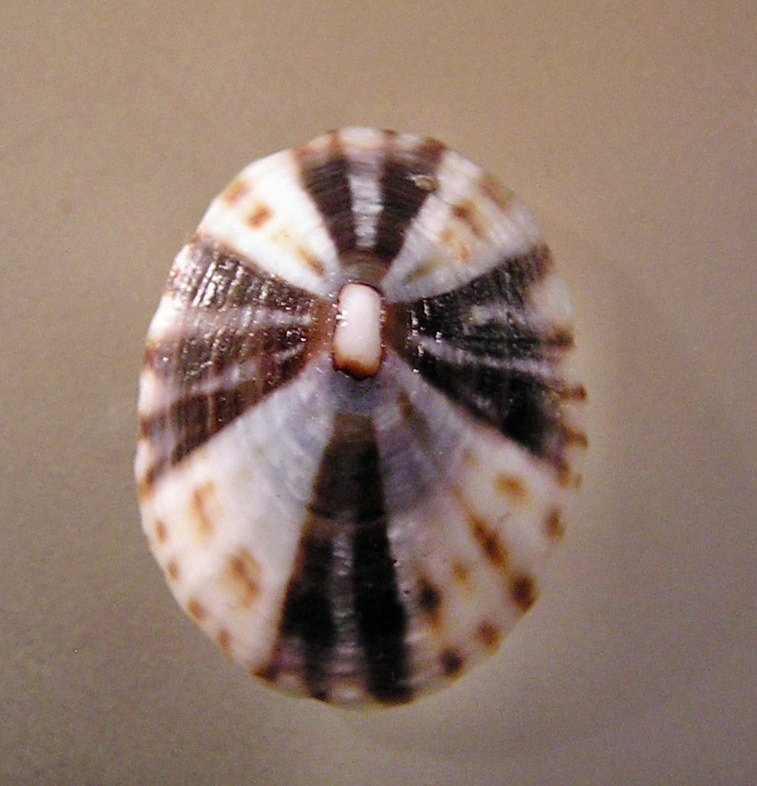

Scientific classification
- Kingdom: Animalia
- Phylum: Mollusca
- Class: Gastropoda
- Subclass: Patellogastropoda
- Family: Lottiidae
- Genus: Patelloida
- Species: P. insignis

Binomial name
- Patelloida insignis (Menke, 1843)

= Patelloida insignis =

Species of gastropod

Patelloida insignis is a species of sea snail, a true limpet, a marine gastropod mollusc in the family Lottiidae, one of the families of true limpets.

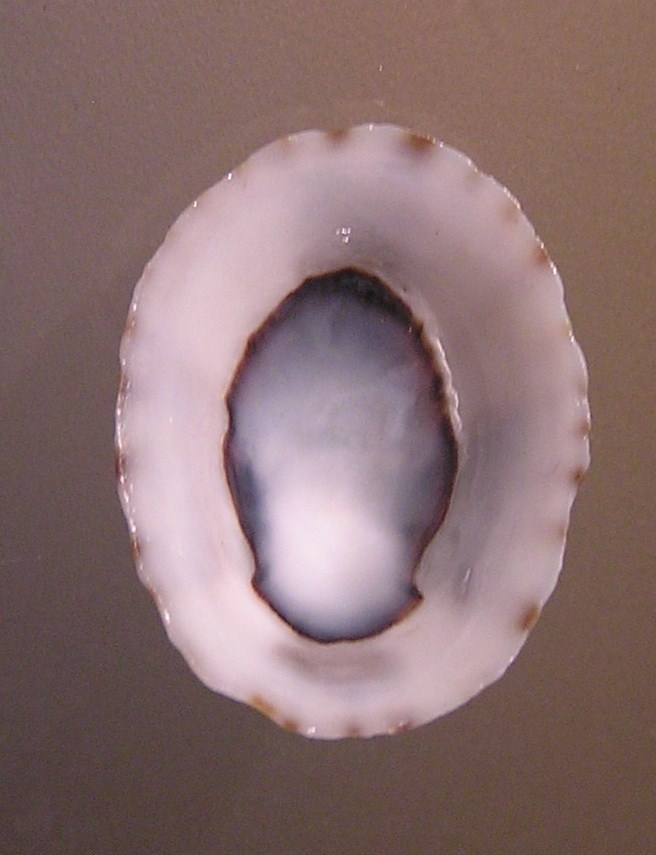
basal view
