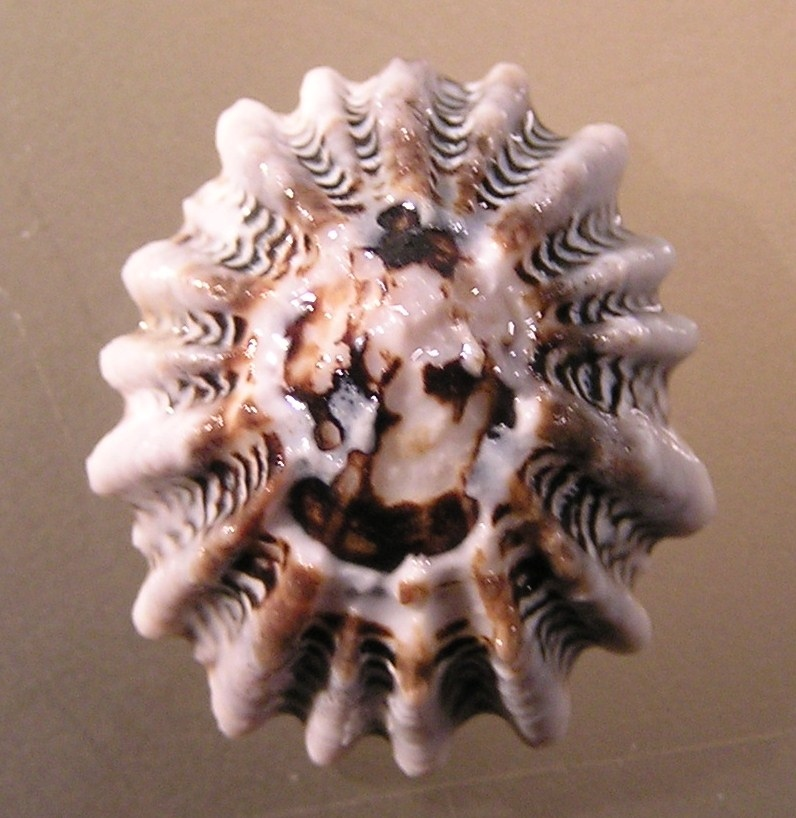

Scientific classification
- Kingdom: Animalia
- Phylum: Mollusca
- Class: Gastropoda
- Subclass: Patellogastropoda
- Family: Lottiidae
- Genus: Patelloida
- Species: P. alticostata

Binomial name
- Patelloida alticostata (Angas, 1865)

= Patelloida alticostata =

Species of gastropod

Patelloida alticostata is a species of sea snail, a true limpet, a marine gastropod mollusc in the family Lottiidae, one of the families of true limpets. This marine gastropod mollusc was first described by Angas in 1865.

== Description ==
Patelloida alticostata has a heavy shell that is narrower anteriorly and widest at the posterior third. The apex is slightly in front of the center. The exterior of the shell features 13-26 strong axial ribs with no secondary ribs between. The margin is strongly crenulate, and the interior is porcellanous white with a spatula that can be black, grey, or brown, outlined with black. The exterior is usually eroded but retains characteristic black cobweb lines between ribs. The shell can grow up to 56 mm in length, though it is commonly about 35 mm.

== Distribution ==
This species is endemic to Australia, found from The Entrance in New South Wales to Kalbarri in Western Australia, including Tasmania. It inhabits exposed or moderately exposed rocky shores in the low intertidal and shallow subtidal zones. Around Sydney, it is more common subtidally than intertidally. The species prefers bare rock surfaces, as its habitat is restricted to small patches of rock.
