= Notoacmea daedala =

Scientific classification
- Kingdom: Animalia
- Phylum: Mollusca
- Class: Gastropoda
- Subclass: Patellogastropoda
- Family: Lottiidae
- Genus: Notoacmea
- Species: N. daedala

Binomial name
- Notoacmea daedala (Suter, 1907)

Synonyms
- Acmaea flammea Hutton, 1883; Acmaea daedala Suter, 1907

Species of gastropod

Notoacmea daedala is a species of sea snail or true limpet, a marine gastropod mollusc in the family Lottiidae, one of the families of true limpets.
