= Nipponacmea vietnamensis =

Scientific classification
- Kingdom: Animalia
- Phylum: Mollusca
- Class: Gastropoda
- Subclass: Patellogastropoda
- Family: Lottiidae
- Genus: Nipponacmea
- Species: N. vietnamensis

Binomial name
- Nipponacmea vietnamensis Chernyshev, 2008

Species of gastropod

Nipponacmea vietnamensis is a species of sea snail, a true limpet, a marine gastropod mollusk in the family Lottiidae, one of the families of true limpets.
