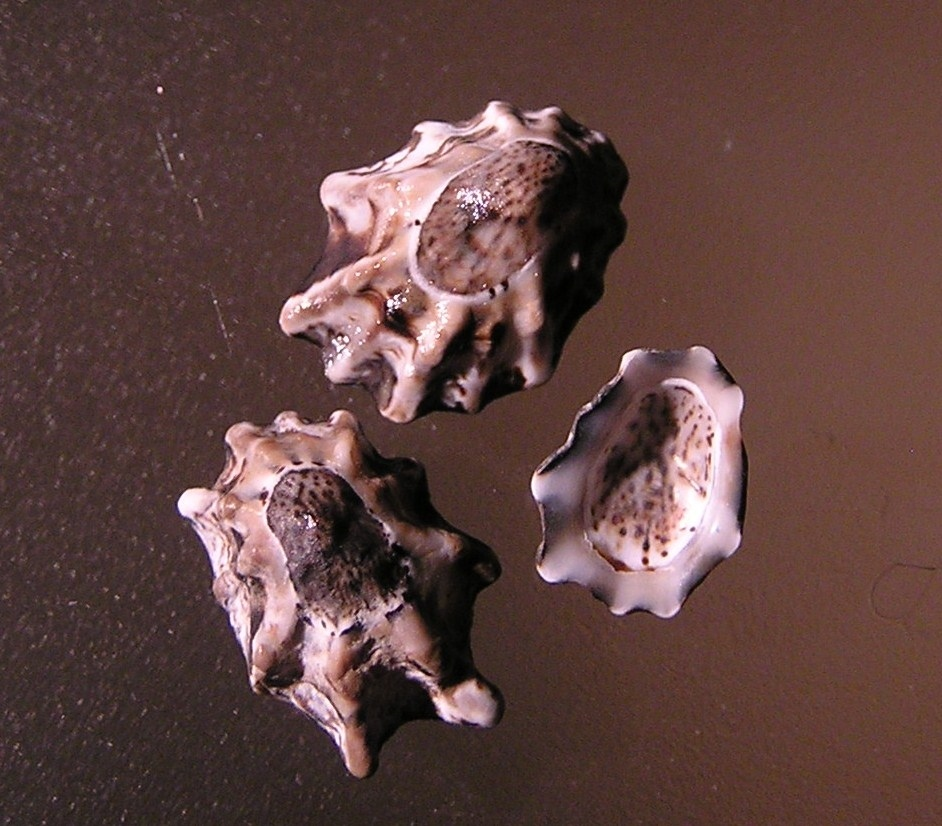

Scientific classification
- Kingdom: Animalia
- Phylum: Mollusca
- Class: Gastropoda
- Subclass: Patellogastropoda
- Family: Lottiidae
- Genus: Patelloida
- Species: P. latistrigata

Binomial name
- Patelloida latistrigata (Angas, 1865)

= Patelloida latistrigata =

Species of gastropod

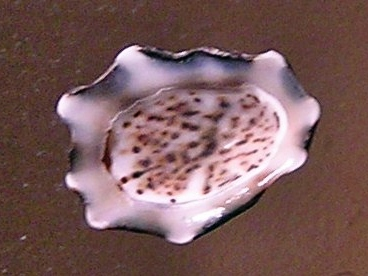
Basal view

Patelloida latistrigata is a species of sea snail, a true limpet, a marine gastropod mollusc in the family Lottiidae, one of the families of true limpets.

== Description ==
Patelloida latistrigata has a ribbed shell that often narrows at one end.

== Distribution ==
Patelloida latistrigata is found in the South Australian Gulfs, particularly in Aldinga Bay, located in South Australia.
