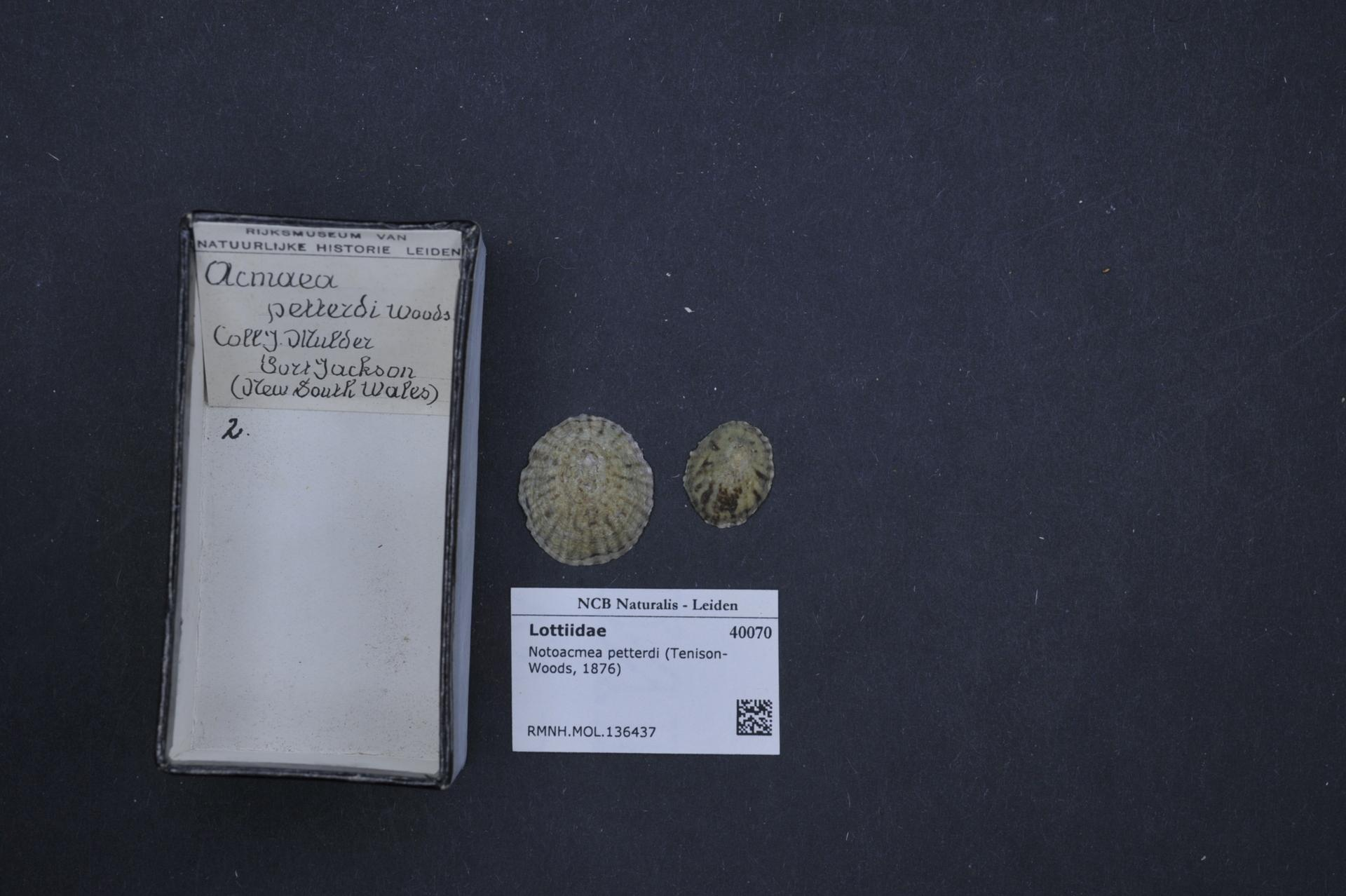

Scientific classification
- Kingdom: Animalia
- Phylum: Mollusca
- Class: Gastropoda
- Subclass: Patellogastropoda
- Family: Lottiidae
- Genus: Notoacmea
- Species: N. petterdi

Binomial name
- Notoacmea petterdi (Tenison-Woods, 1876)

= Notoacmea petterdi =

Species of gastropod

Notoacmea petterdi is a species of sea snail, a true limpet, a marine gastropod mollusk in the family Lottiidae, one of the families of true limpets.
