= Emmy Lischke =

German painter

- Born: 13 November 1860; Elberfeld, Kingdom of Prussia
- Died: 14 May 1914 (aged 53); Munich, German Empire
- Known for: Painting

Emmy Lischke (1860-1919) was a German painter known for her landscapes and still lifes.

== Biography ==
Lischke was born on November 13, 1860, in Elberfeld (now part of Wuppertal), Kingdom of Prussia. She was the daughter of Alwine von der Heydt and Elberfeld mayor Karl Emil Lischke. She studied painting in Dusseldorf and then continued her studies at the Academy of Fine Arts, Munich. There she studied with Ludwig Willroider and Theodor Her. She exhibited her work at the Woman's Building at the 1893 World's Columbian Exposition in Chicago, Illinois.

Lischke died on May 14, 1914, in Munich.

== Exhibitions (selection) ==
- 1891: Munich annual exhibition of works of art from all nations in the glass palace - paintings wildflowers, flowers
- 1893: Annual exhibition in Munich of works of art from all nations in the glass palace – paintings forest weaving, evening, love spring
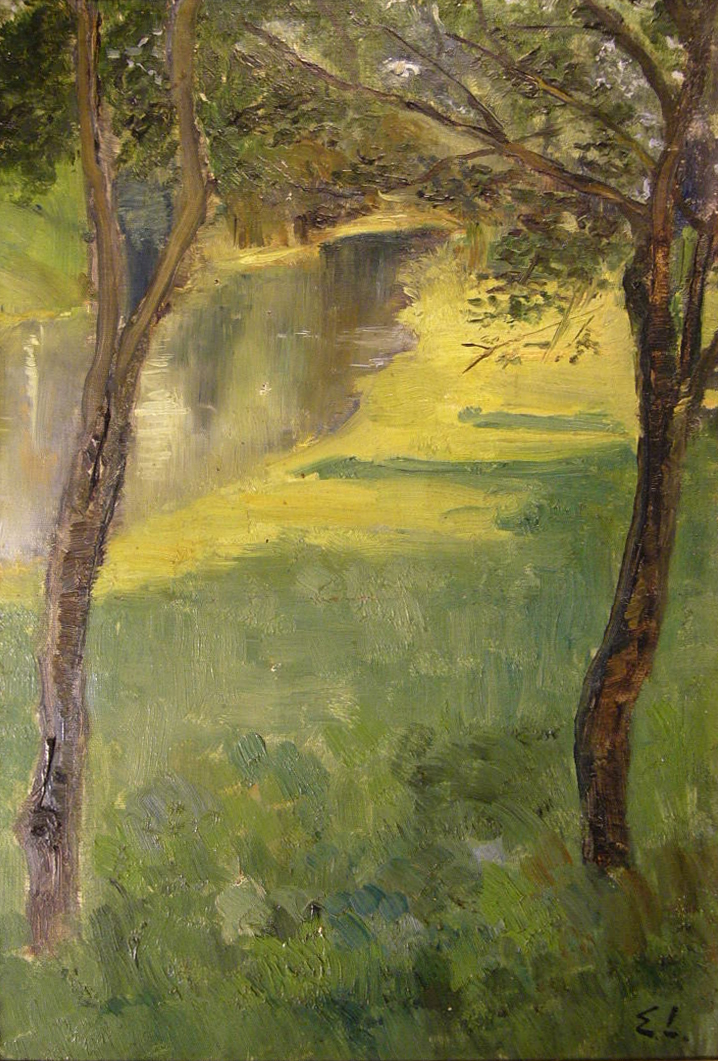
- Riverside by Emmy Lischke
  1893: Great Berlin Art Exhibition – Paintings at the Spring
- 1893: World's Columbian Exposition (Chicago World's Fair), Rotunda of the Women's Pavilion - Field Flowers painting
- 1894: Great Berlin Art Exhibition – Painting Forest Weaving, evening
- 1894: Gallery Eduard Schulte, Dusseldorf
- 1895: International art exhibition of the Munich Secession Association of Fine Artists - oil painting autumn
- 1895: Great Berlin art exhibition - paintings, still lifes
- 1896: International Art Exhibition Berlin - Painting Autumn Storm
- 1898: 16th art exhibition of the Association of Female Artists and Art Friends in Berlin in the building of the Royal Academy of Arts in Berlin, Unter den Linden 38 – painting autumn storm
- 1899: Munich Annual Exhibition in the Glass Palace - Paintings Holy Grove, In the Storm
- 1899: Great Berlin Art Exhibition - Paintings On the Black Water, Before the Thunderstorm
- 1901: Great Berlin Art Exhibition - Painting Sacred Grove
- 1902: Munich Annual Exhibition in the Glass Palace – Painting Summer Morning and a Portrait
- 1902: Galerie Eduard Schulte, Berlin – paintings
- 1902: Great Berlin Art Exhibition – Paintings Rigid World, Lonely Cape
- 1903: Exhibition in the Künstlerhaus in Munich on the occasion of the conference of the 3rd Bavarian Women's Day
- 1906: Munich Annual Exhibition in the Glass Palace - Paintings by the Sea
- 1907: Kölnischer Kunstverein – 12 paintings
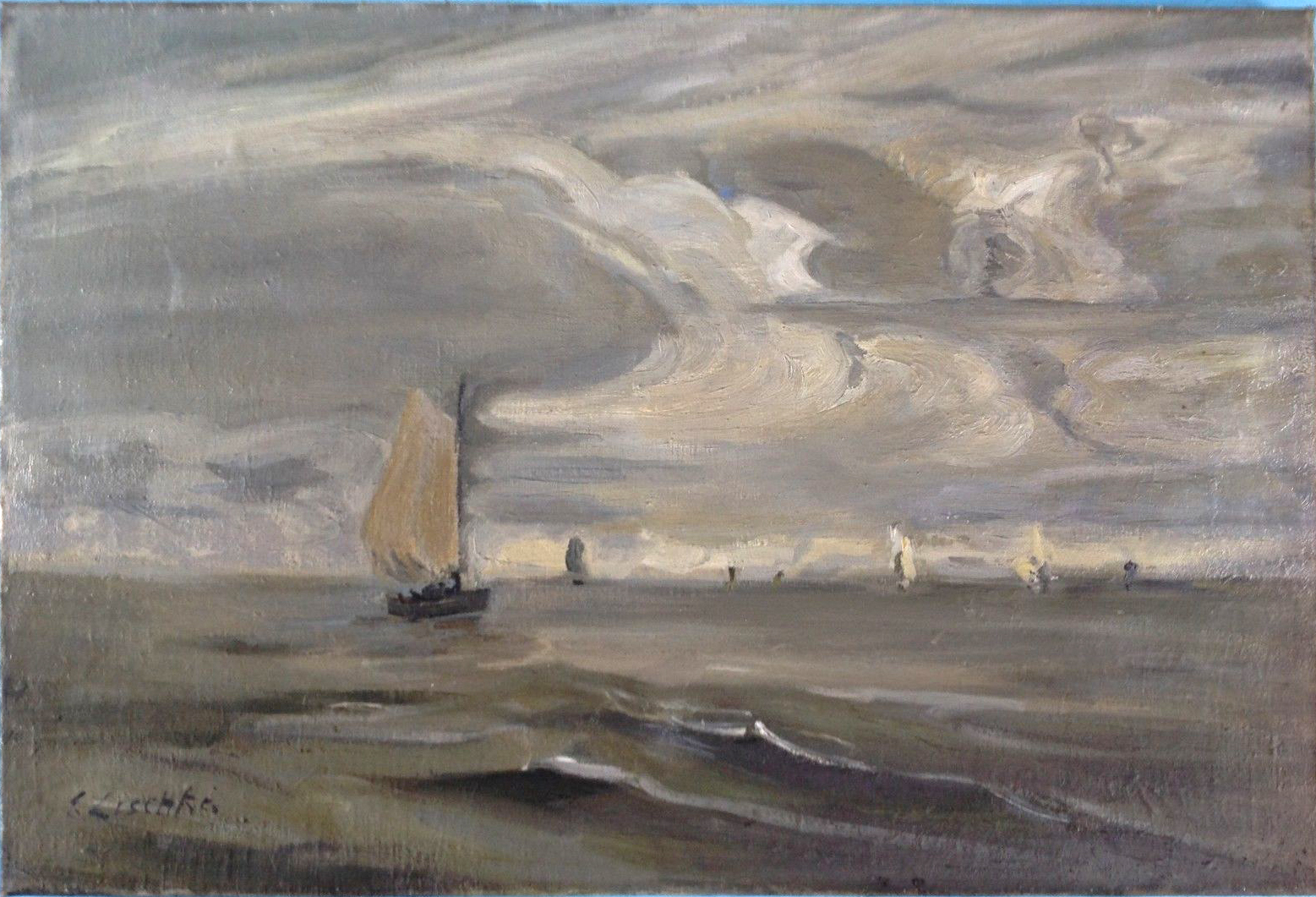
- Sailing Sea Ship
  1908: Munich Annual Exhibition in the Glass Palace - Paintings by the Sea
- 1909: 10th International Art Exhibition in the Glass Palace – painting silver poplars
- 1910: Munich annual exhibition in the glass palace - oil painting Mondnacht
- 1910: Great Berlin art exhibition - paintings by the sea, silver poplar grove
- 1911: Jubilee exhibition of the Munich artists' association in honor of the 90th birthday of Prince Regent Luitpold of Bavaria in the Glass Palace - oil painting Grauer Tag, Marine
- 1911: Baden-Baden art exhibition – paintings
- 1913: Munich art exhibition in the glass palace – oil painting Cloudy Day
- 1913: Great Berlin Art Exhibition - Painting Summer Day, The Sea
- 1916: Munich art exhibition in the glass palace - oil painting The Wave, In the harbor, roses
- 1916: Great Berlin Art Exhibition – Summer Paintings
- 1917: Munich art exhibition in the glass palace - oil paintings hyacinths, roses
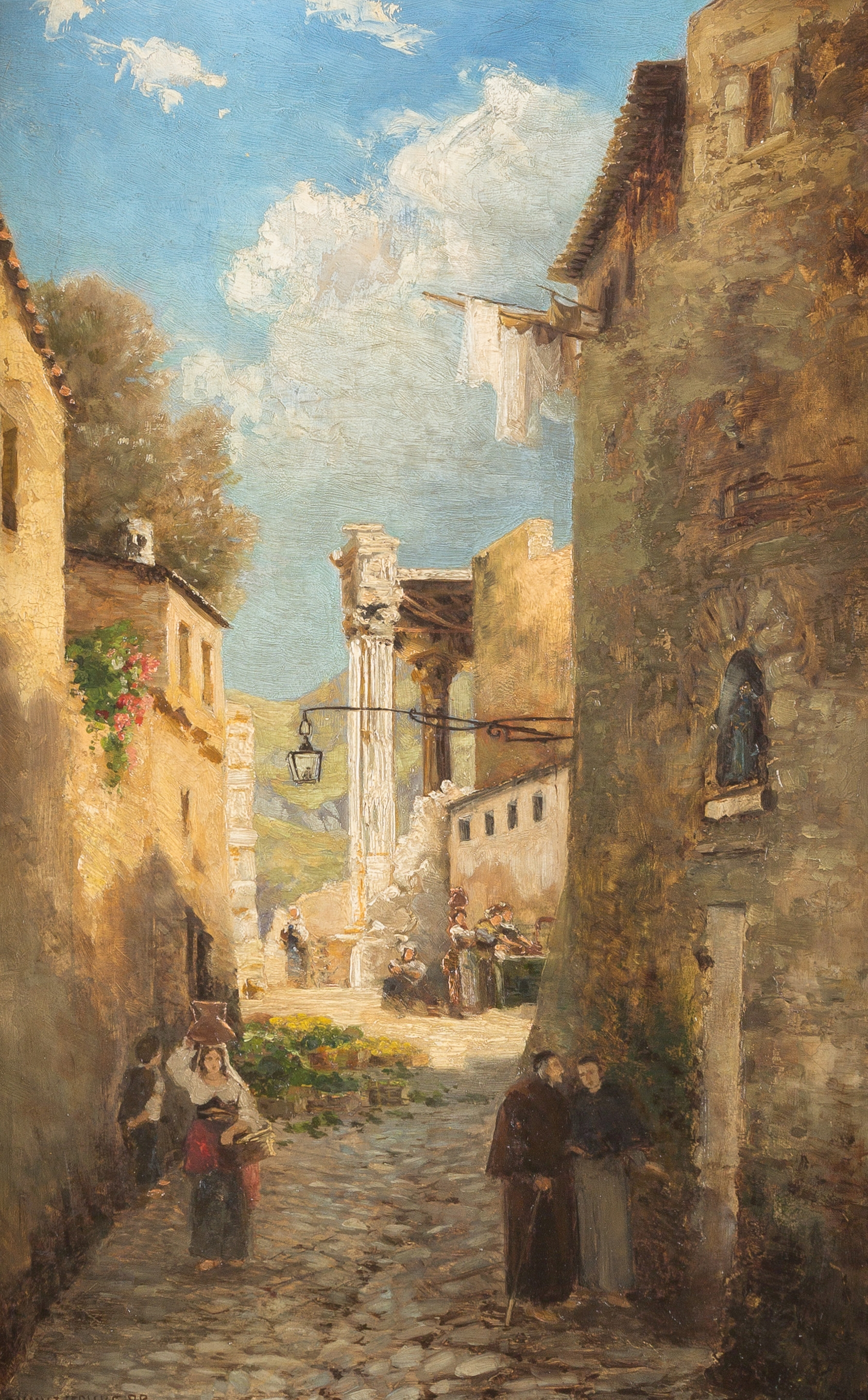
- View of an Italian town, 1888
  1918: Munich art exhibition in the glass palace - oil painting bathing beach, low tide
- 1919: Munich art exhibition in the glass palace – oil painting on the Breton coast
- 1941: Kunstverein Munich – paintings

== Literature ==
- Friedrich von Boetticher : paintings of the nineteenth century. Contribution to Art History . Volume I, Dresden 1891, p. 887. (digital copy)
- Anton Hirsch: The visual artists of modern times. Ferdinand Enke Verlag, Stuttgart 1905.
- Hermann Alexander Müller : Allgemeines Künstler-Lexicon, Volume 5, Hans Wolfgang Singer (ed.), Rütten & Loening 1921, p. 190. (Digital copy)
- Richard Braungart : Emmy Lischke. In: Art for everyone. Aug. 1922, pp. 345–351. (digitized)
- Hans Vollmer (ed.): Founded by Ulrich Thieme and Felix Becker . tape 23 : Leitenstorfer–Mander . EA Seemann, Leipzig 1929, p. 281-282 .
- Joachim Busse (ed.): International handbook of all painters and sculptors of the 19th century. Busse Art Documentation GmbH, Wiesbaden 1977, ISBN 3-9800062-0-4
- Horst Ludwig: Munich painting in the 19th century. Hirmer Verlag, Munich 1978.
- Uwe Eckardt: The Elberfeld painter Emmy Lischke (1860-1919). In: History in Wuppertal. Volume 3, 1994, pp. 115–118.
- Hans Paffrath (ed.): Lexicon of the Düsseldorf school of painting 1819-1918. Volume 2: Haach-Murtfeldt. Published by the Düsseldorf Art Museum in the Ehrenhof and by the Paffrath Gallery. Bruckmann, Munich 1998, ISBN 3-7654-3010-2
- Bénézit Dictionary of Artists. 1999 (in English or French)
