= Patelloida ryukyuensis =

Scientific classification
- Kingdom: Animalia
- Phylum: Mollusca
- Class: Gastropoda
- Subclass: Patellogastropoda
- Family: Lottiidae
- Genus: Patelloida
- Species: P. ryukyuensis

Binomial name
- Patelloida ryukyuensis Nakano & Ozawa, 2005

Species of gastropod

Patelloida ryukyuensis is a species of sea snail, a true limpet, a marine gastropod mollusc in the family Lottiidae, one of the families of true limpets.
