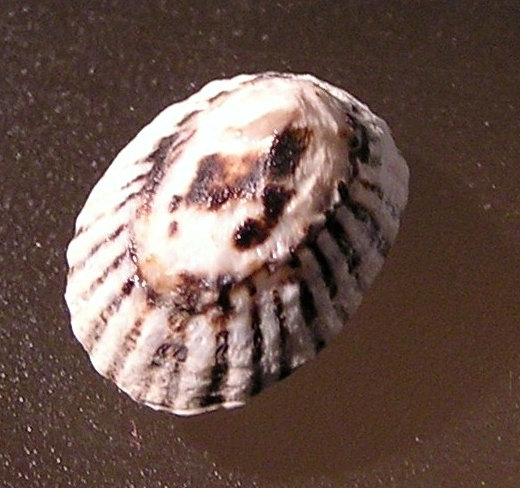
- A shell of Notoacmea scopulina

Scientific classification
- Kingdom: Animalia
- Phylum: Mollusca
- Class: Gastropoda
- Subclass: Patellogastropoda
- Family: Lottiidae
- Genus: Notoacmea
- Species: N. scopulina

Binomial name
- Notoacmea scopulina Oliver, 1926

= Notoacmea scopulina =

Species of gastropod

Notoacmea scopulina is a species of sea snail or true limpet, a marine gastropod mollusc in the family Lottiidae, one of the families of true limpets.

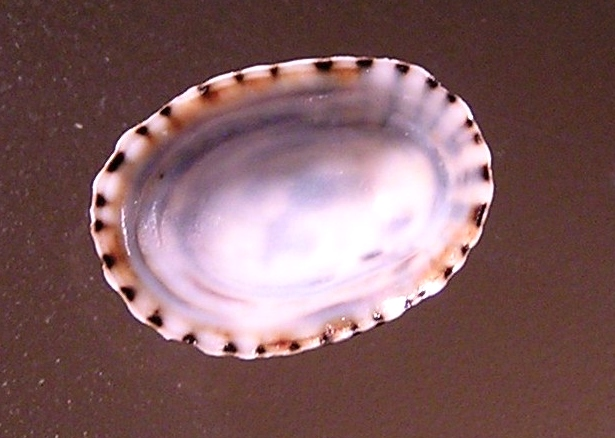
Basal view of the shell
