= Radiacmea =

Scientific classification
- Kingdom: Animalia
- Phylum: Mollusca
- Class: Gastropoda
- Subclass: Patellogastropoda
- Superfamily: Lottioidea
- Family: Lottiidae
- Genus: Radiacmea; Iredale, 1915

Species
- See text

Genus of gastropods

Radiacmea is a southern genus of true limpets, marine gastropod molluscs in the family Lottiidae.

== Species ==
Species within the genus Radiacmea include:

- Radiacmea inconspicua (Gray, 1843)
- Radiacmea intermedia (Suter, 1907)
