= Nipponacmea habei =

Scientific classification
- Kingdom: Animalia
- Phylum: Mollusca
- Class: Gastropoda
- Subclass: Patellogastropoda
- Family: Lottiidae
- Genus: Nipponacmea
- Species: N. habei

Binomial name
- Nipponacmea habei (Saski & Okutani, 1994)

Species of gastropod

Nipponacmea habei is a species of sea snail, a true limpet, a marine gastropod mollusk in the family Lottiidae, one of the families of true limpets.
