= Patelloida signata =

Scientific classification
- Kingdom: Animalia
- Phylum: Mollusca
- Class: Gastropoda
- Subclass: Patellogastropoda
- Family: Lottiidae
- Genus: Patelloida
- Species: P. signata

Binomial name
- Patelloida signata (Pilsbry, 1901)

Species of gastropod

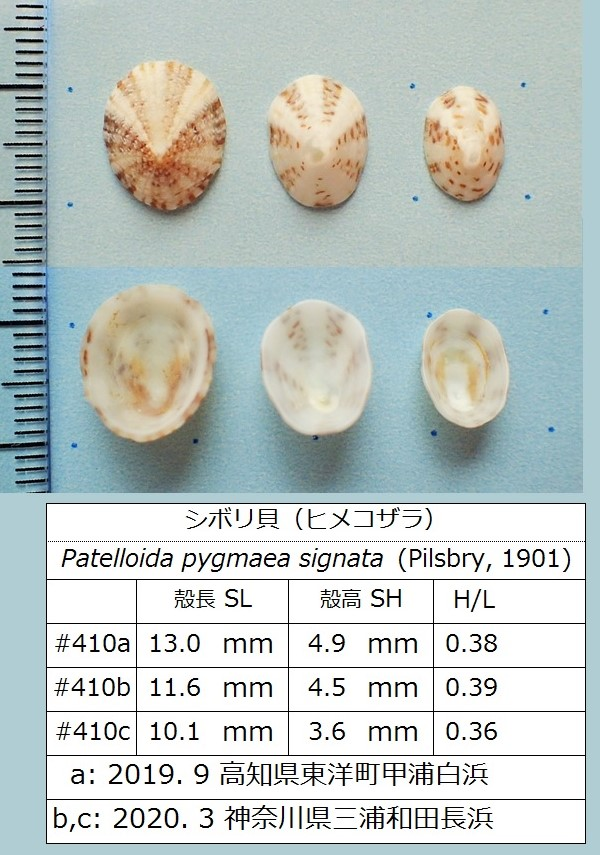
Patelloida signata shells from Toyo-cho Kochi and Miura pen, Kanagawa, Pacific Ocean in Japan.

Patelloida signata is a species of sea snail, a true limpet, a marine gastropod mollusc in the family Lottiidae, one of the families of true limpets.
