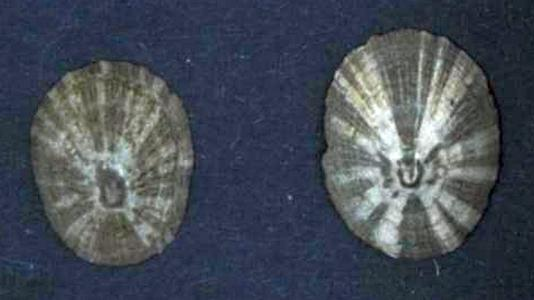

Scientific classification
- Kingdom: Animalia
- Phylum: Mollusca
- Class: Gastropoda
- Subclass: Patellogastropoda
- Family: Lottiidae
- Genus: Patelloida
- Species: P. heroldi

Binomial name
- Patelloida heroldi (Dunker, 1861)

Synonyms
- Acmaea heroldi Dunker, 1861 (original combination)

= Patelloida heroldi =

Species of gastropod

Patelloida heroldi is a species of sea snail, a true limpet, a marine gastropod mollusc in the family Lottiidae, one of the families of true limpets.
