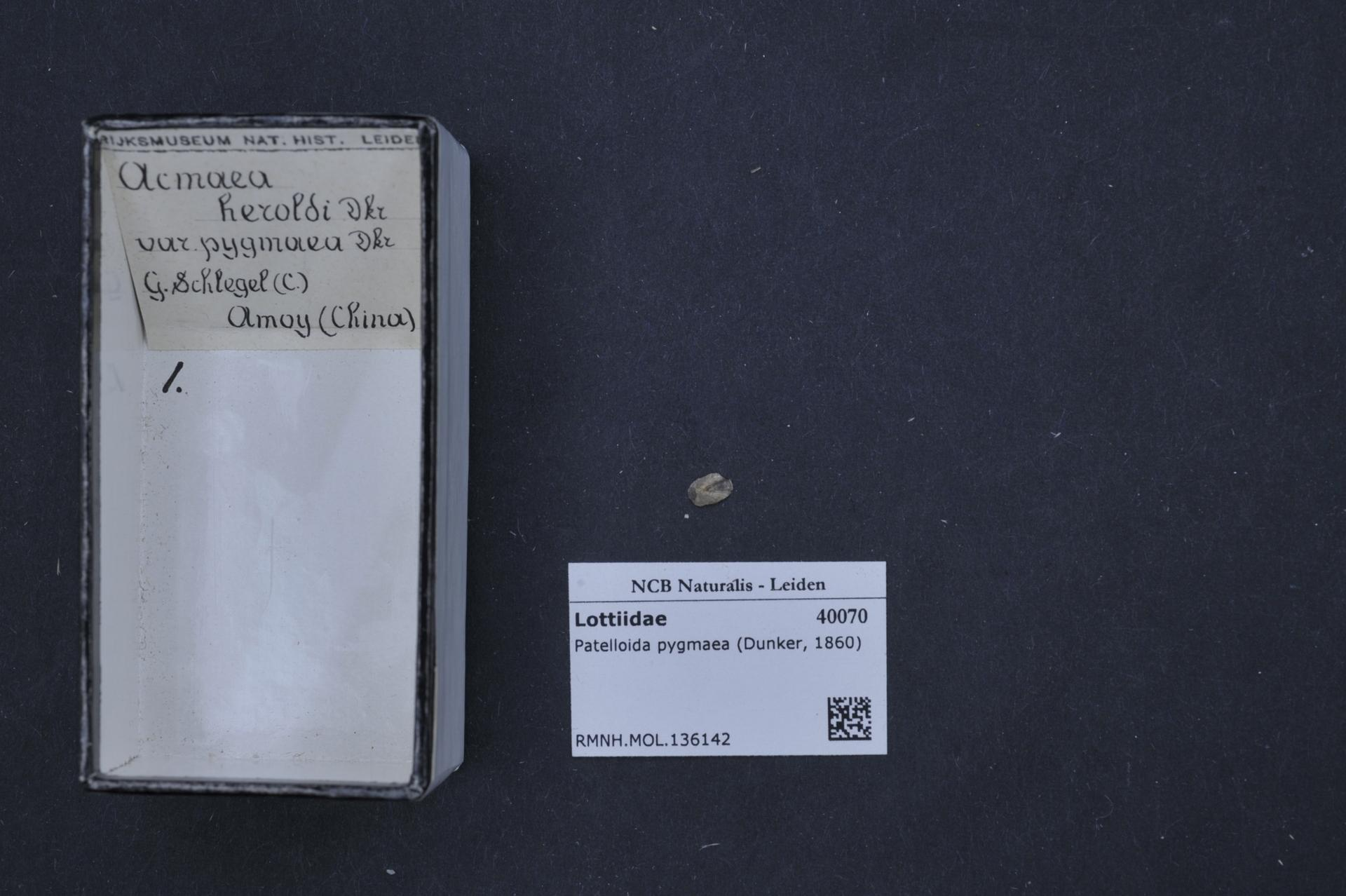
- Sample collected by Naturalis Biodiversity Center in Amoy, an island between Taiwan and Mainland China.

Scientific classification
- Kingdom: Animalia
- Phylum: Mollusca
- Class: Gastropoda
- Subclass: Patellogastropoda
- Family: Lottiidae
- Genus: Patelloida
- Species: P. pygmaea

Binomial name
- Patelloida pygmaea (Dunker, 1860)

Synonyms
- Acmaea testudinalis var. minor Grabau & King, 1928

= Patelloida pygmaea =

Species of gastropod

Patelloida pygmaea is a species of sea snail, a true limpet, a marine gastropod mollusc in the family Lottiidae, one of the families of true limpets.

== Description ==
Oval shape (eggshell shape) limpet with varying colours on the shell. Usually spots on greyish-brown or pale-white background with regular edge.

== Distribution ==
Distributed around Yellow Sea of Mainland China, as well as Taiwan. Living in inter-tidal area, bay area with sheltering. Often appears around places where oysters are growing.
