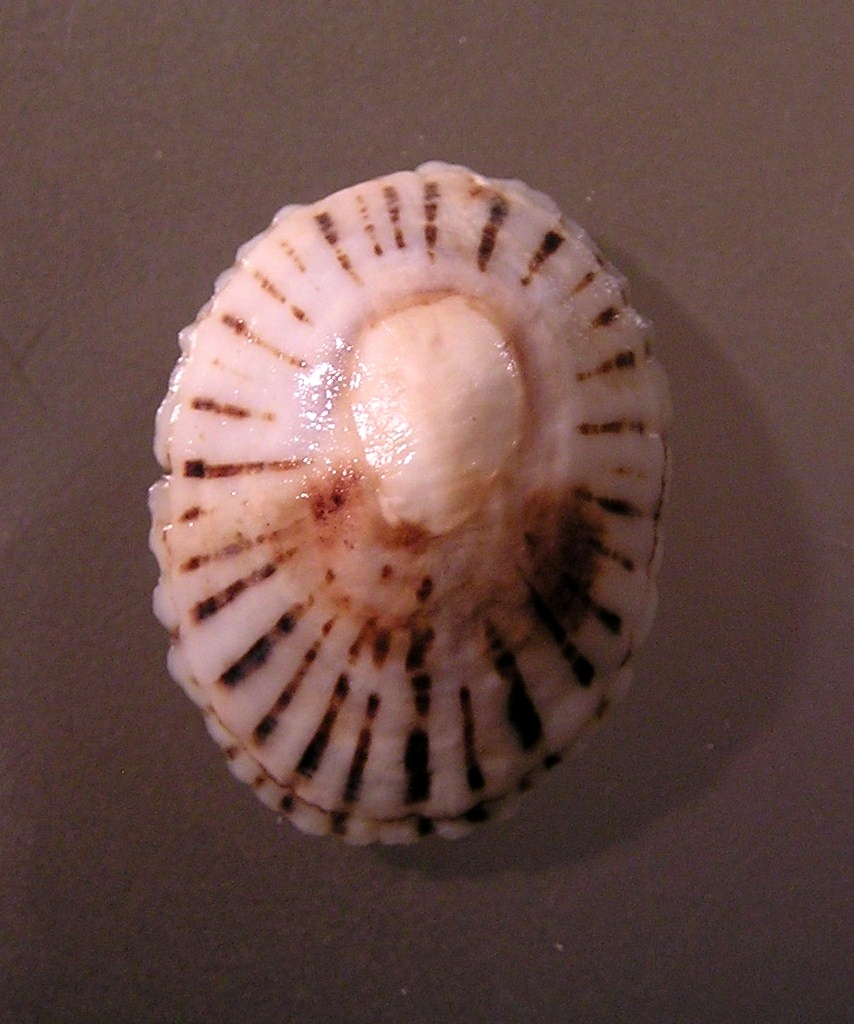

Scientific classification
- Kingdom: Animalia
- Phylum: Mollusca
- Class: Gastropoda
- Subclass: Patellogastropoda
- Family: Lottiidae
- Genus: Patelloida
- Species: P. nigrosulcata

Binomial name
- Patelloida nigrosulcata (Reeve, 1855)

= Patelloida nigrosulcata =

Species of gastropod

Patelloida nigrosulcata is a species of sea snail, a true limpet, a marine gastropod mollusc in the family Lottiidae, one of the families of true limpets.

== Description ==
Patelloida nigrosulcata embryos develop into planktonic trochophore larvae and afterwards into juvenile veligers before becoming grown adults.

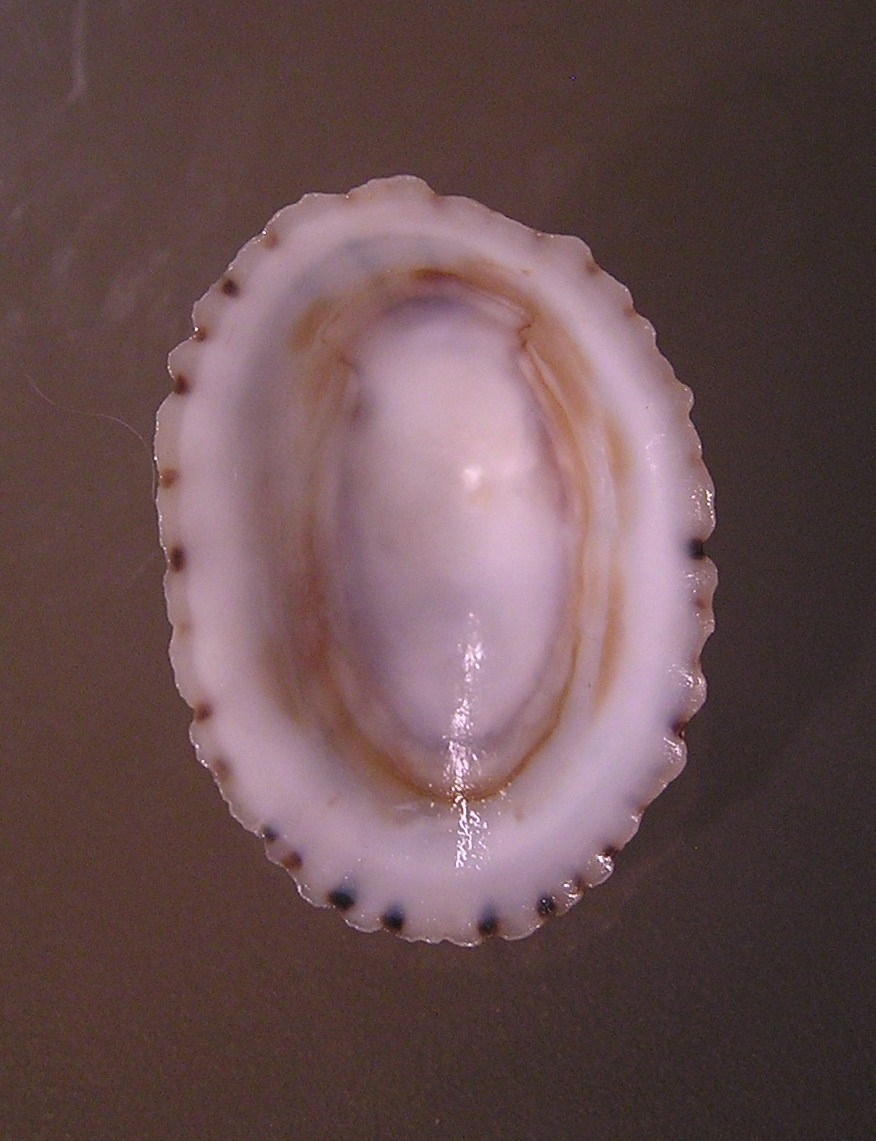
basal view

== Distribution ==
Patelloida nigrosulcata is found in the seas of the Australia.
