= Notoacmea rapida =

Scientific classification
- Kingdom: Animalia
- Phylum: Mollusca
- Class: Gastropoda
- Subclass: Patellogastropoda
- Family: Lottiidae
- Genus: Notoacmea
- Species: N. rapida

Binomial name
- Notoacmea rapida Nakano, Marshall, Kennedy & Spencer, 2009

Species of gastropod

Notoacmea rapida is a species of sea snail, a true limpet, a marine gastropod mollusk in the family Lottiidae, one of the families of true limpets.
