= Notoacmea subtilis =

Scientific classification
- Kingdom: Animalia
- Phylum: Mollusca
- Class: Gastropoda
- Subclass: Patellogastropoda
- Family: Lottiidae
- Genus: Notoacmea
- Species: N. subtilis

Binomial name
- Notoacmea subtilis (Suter, 1907)

Synonyms
- Acmaea subtilis Suter, 1907

Species of gastropod

Notoacmea subtilis is a minute species of sea snail or true limpet, a marine gastropod mollusc in the family Lottiidae, one of the families of true limpets.
