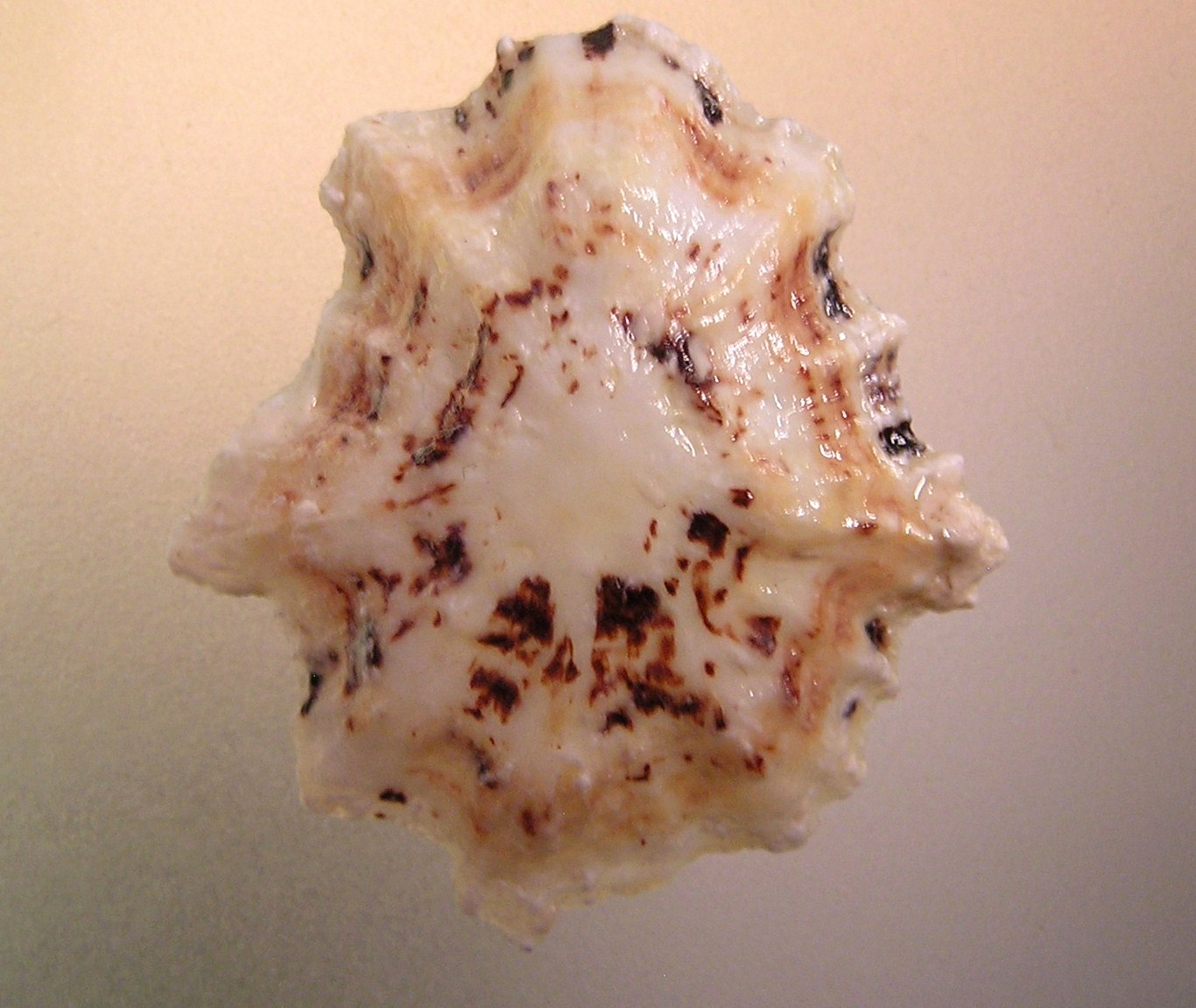

Scientific classification
- Kingdom: Animalia
- Phylum: Mollusca
- Class: Gastropoda
- Subclass: Patellogastropoda
- Family: Lottiidae
- Genus: Patelloida
- Species: P. saccharinoides

Binomial name
- Patelloida saccharinoides Habe & Kosuge, 1996

= Patelloida saccharinoides =

Species of gastropod

Patelloida saccharinoides is a species of sea snail, a true limpet, a marine gastropod mollusc in the family Lottiidae, one of the families of true limpets.

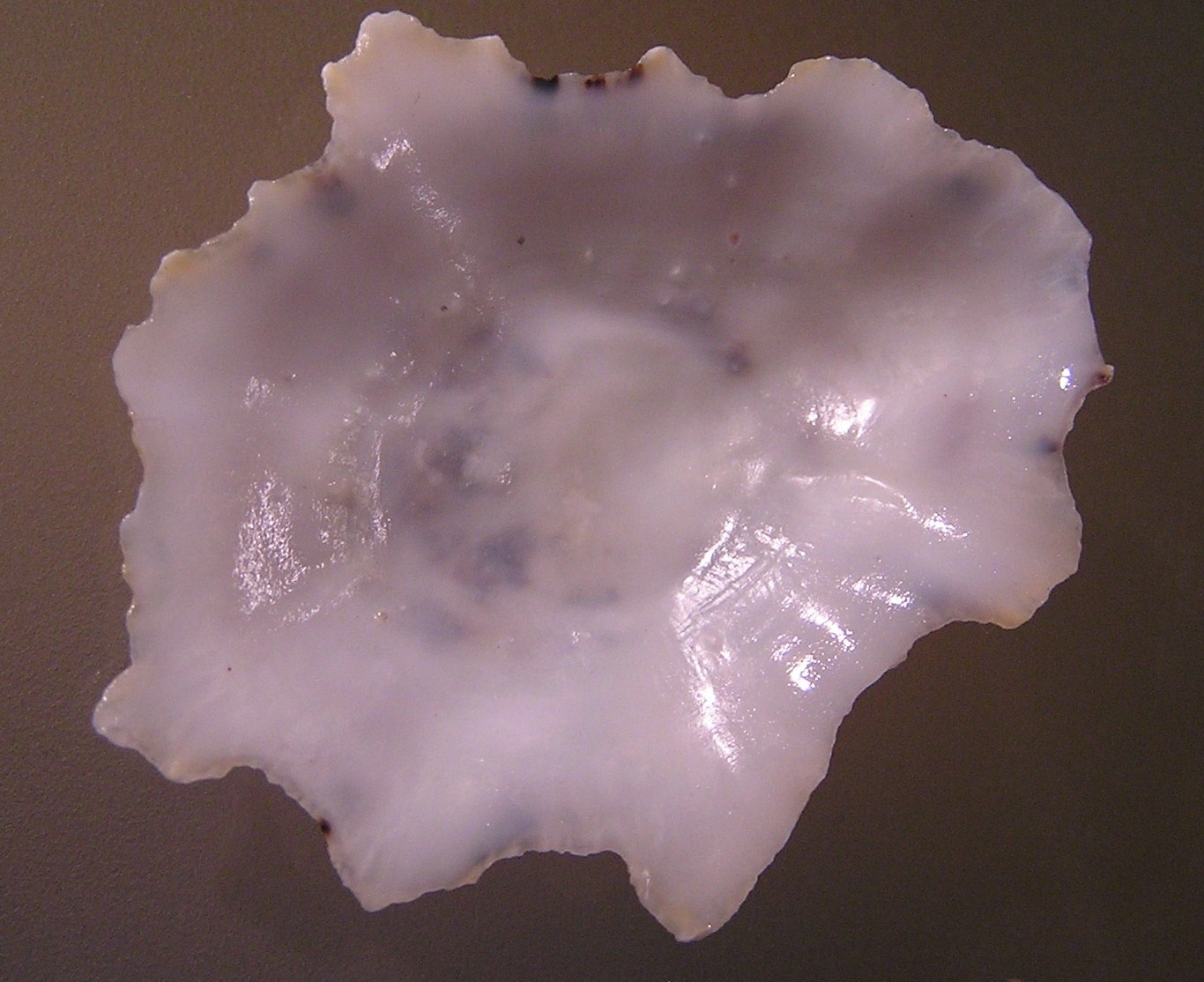
basal view
