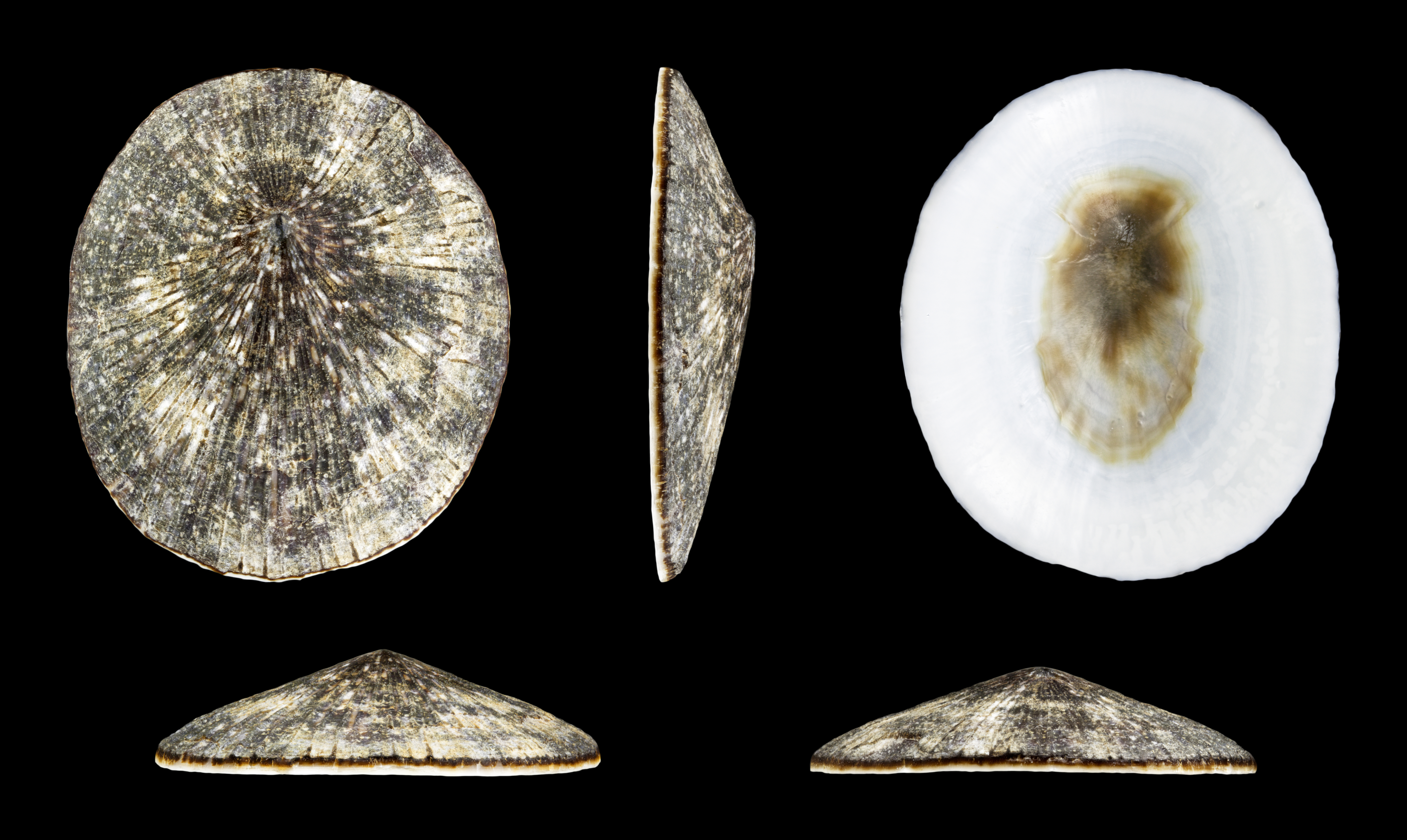
- Shell of Patelloida striata (syntype at MNHN, Paris)

Scientific classification
- Kingdom: Animalia
- Phylum: Mollusca
- Class: Gastropoda
- Subclass: Patellogastropoda
- Family: Lottiidae
- Genus: Patelloida
- Species: P. striata

Binomial name
- Patelloida striata (Quoy & Gaimard, 1834)

Synonyms
- Acmaea striata (Quoy & Gaimard, 1834); Collisella striata (Quoy & Gaimard, 1834)

= Patelloida striata =

Species of gastropod

Patelloida striata is a species of sea snail, a true limpet, a marine gastropod mollusc in the family Lottiidae, one of the families of true limpets.

== Description ==
The length of the shell attains 30.4 mm.

== Distribution ==
This marine species occurs off Indonesia

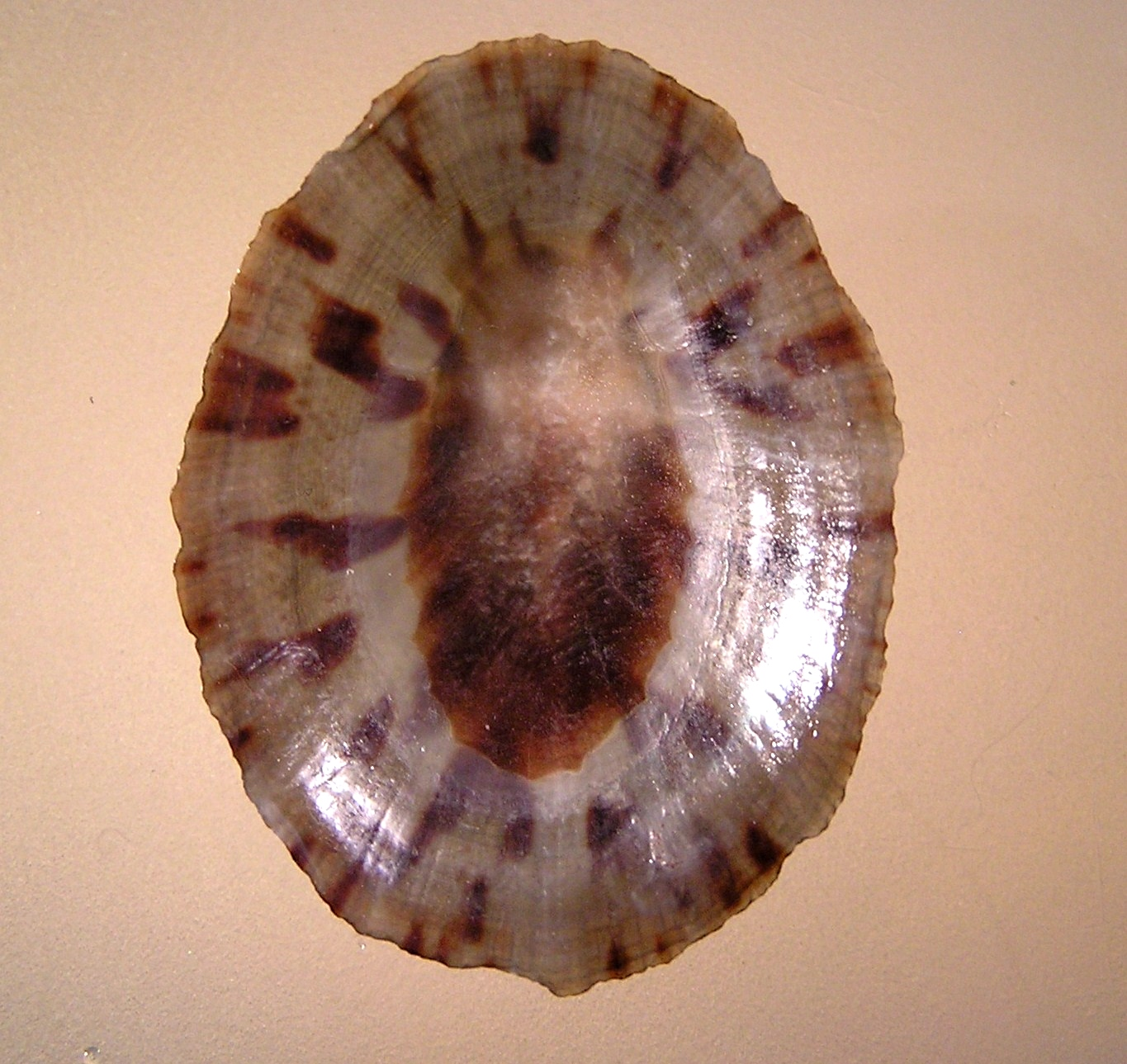
Basal view
