= Nyssodectes concinna =

Scientific classification
- Kingdom: Animalia
- Phylum: Arthropoda
- Class: Insecta
- Order: Coleoptera
- Suborder: Polyphaga
- Infraorder: Cucujiformia
- Family: Cerambycidae
- Genus: Nyssodectes
- Species: N. concinna

Binomial name
- Nyssodectes concinna (Bates, 1885)

Species of beetle

Nyssodectes concinna is a species of beetle in the family Cerambycidae. It was described by Henry Walter Bates in 1885.
