= Radiacmea intermedia =

Scientific classification
- Kingdom: Animalia
- Phylum: Mollusca
- Class: Gastropoda
- Subclass: Patellogastropoda
- Family: Lottiidae
- Genus: Radiacmea
- Species: R. intermedia

Binomial name
- Radiacmea intermedia (Suter, 1907)

Species of gastropod

Radiacmea intermedia is a species of small sea snail or true limpet, a marine gastropod mollusc in the family Lottiidae, one of the true limpet families.
