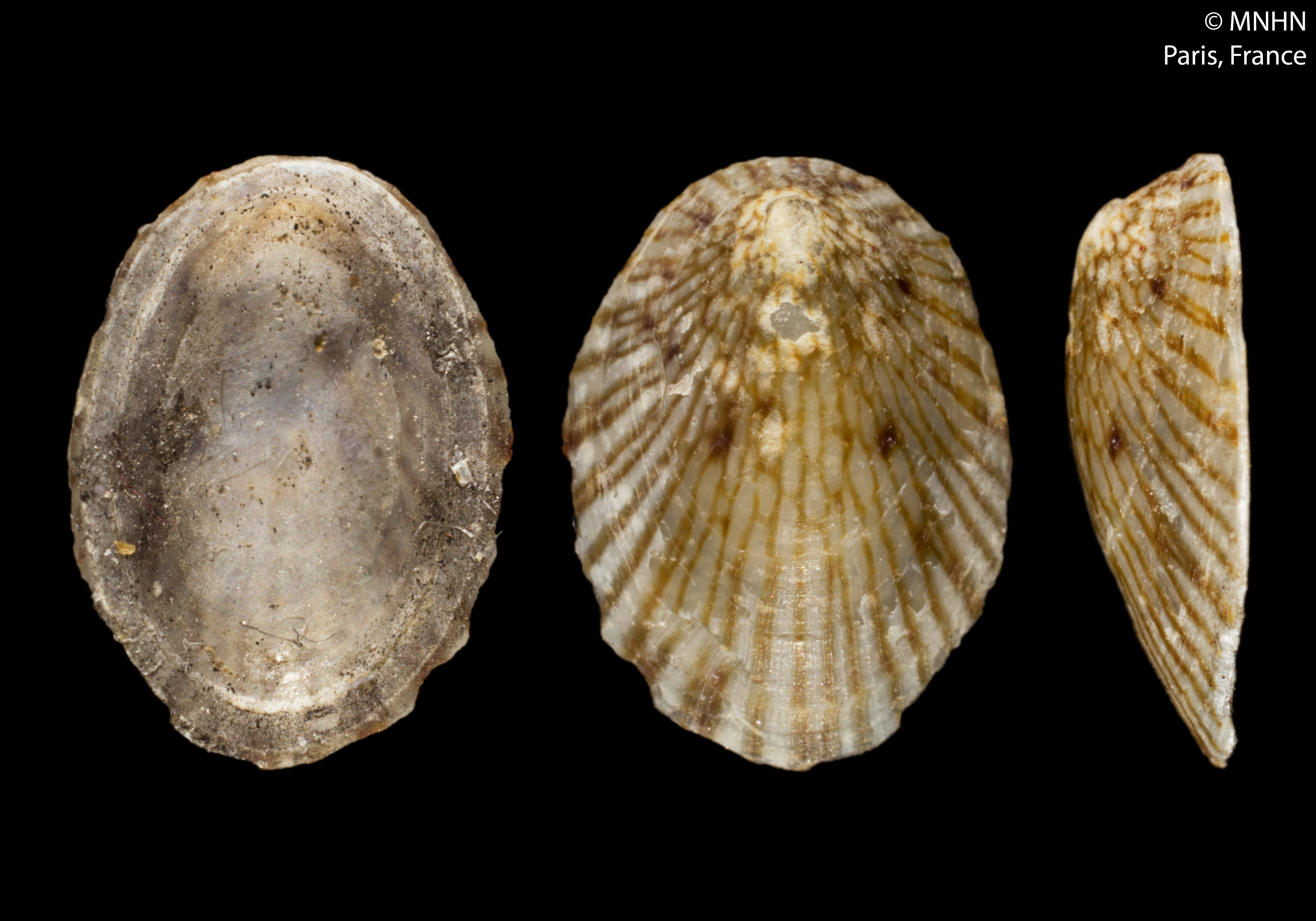
- Shell of Notoacmea elongata (lectotype at MNHN, Paris)

Conservation status
- Not Threatened (NZ TCS)

Scientific classification
- Kingdom: Animalia
- Phylum: Mollusca
- Class: Gastropoda
- Subclass: Patellogastropoda
- Family: Lottiidae
- Genus: Notoacmea
- Species: N. elongata

Binomial name
- Notoacmea elongata (Quoy & Gaimard, 1834)

Synonyms
- Acmaea helmsi E. A. Smith, 1894; Acmaea helmsi Suter, 1913; Acmaea parviconoidea leucoma Suter, 1907; Notoacmea helmsi (E. A. Smith, 1894); Notoacmea virescens Oliver, 1926; Patelloida elongata Quoy & Gaimard, 1834

= Notoacmea elongata =

Species of gastropod

Notoacmea elongata is a small species of sea snail, a true limpet, a marine gastropod mollusk in the family Lottiidae, one of the families of true limpets.

== Description ==
The length of the shell attains 6.35 mm.

== Distribution ==
This marine species is found in the coastal waters of New Zealand.
