= Asteracmea suteri =

Scientific classification
- Kingdom: Animalia
- Phylum: Mollusca
- Class: Gastropoda
- Subclass: Patellogastropoda
- Superfamily: Lottioidea
- Family: Lottiidae
- Genus: Asteracmea
- Species: A. suteri

Binomial name
- Asteracmea suteri (Iredale, 1915)

Synonyms
- Acmaea roseoradiata Suter, 1907; Notoacmea suteri Iredale, 1915

Species of gastropod

Asteracmea suteri is a species of sea snail or true limpet, a marine gastropod mollusc in the family Lottiidae.
