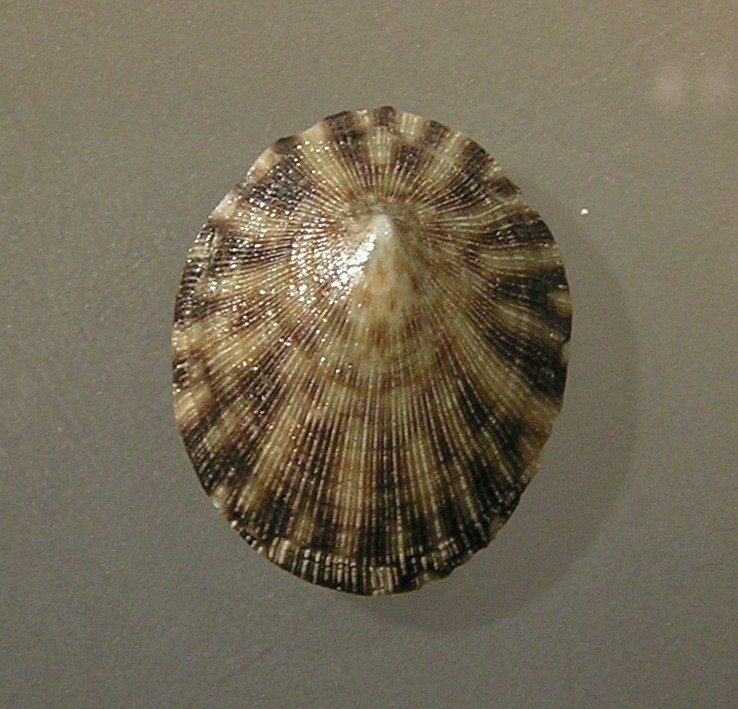
- Nipponacmea fuscoviridis

Scientific classification
- Kingdom: Animalia
- Phylum: Mollusca
- Class: Gastropoda
- Subclass: Patellogastropoda
- Family: Lottiidae
- Genus: Nipponacmea
- Species: N. fuscoviridis

Binomial name
- Nipponacmea fuscoviridis (Teramachi, 1949)

Synonyms
- Notoacmea fuscoviridis Teramachi, 1949; Notoacmea concinna fuscoviridis Kira, 1954; Notoacmea concinna Takahashi and Okamoto

= Nipponacmea fuscoviridis =

Species of gastropod

Nipponacmea fuscoviridis is a species of sea snail, a true limpet, a marine gastropod mollusk in the family Lottiidae, one of the families of true limpets.

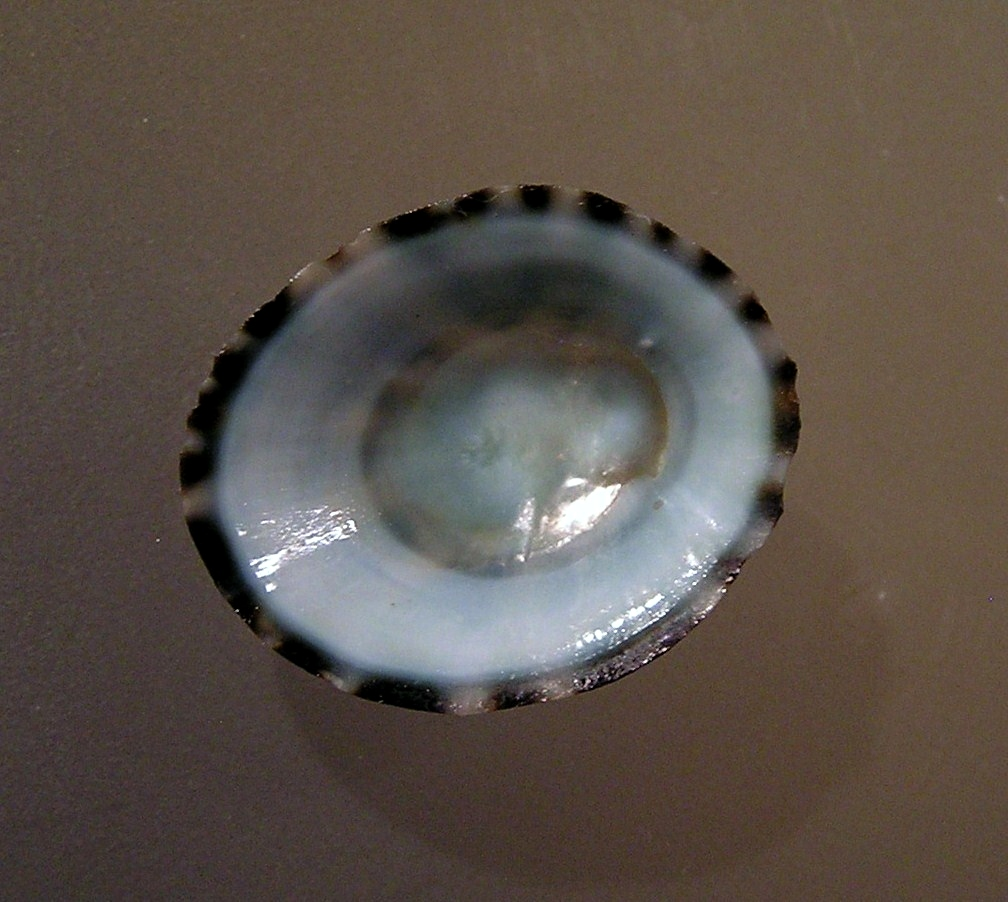
basal view
