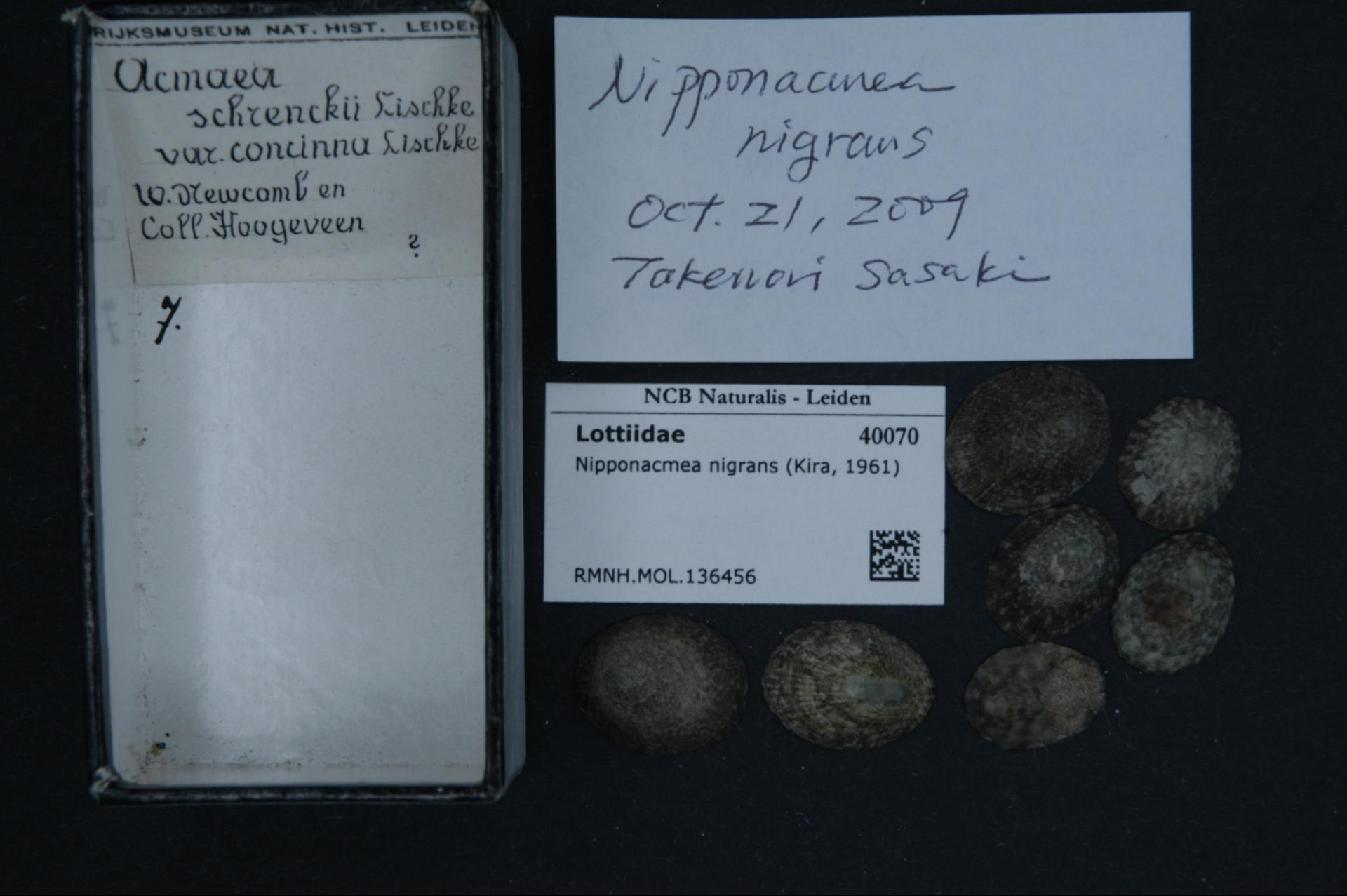

Scientific classification
- Kingdom: Animalia
- Phylum: Mollusca
- Class: Gastropoda
- Subclass: Patellogastropoda
- Family: Lottiidae
- Genus: Nipponacmea
- Species: N. nigrans

Binomial name
- Nipponacmea nigrans (Kira, 1961)

= Nipponacmea nigrans =

Species of gastropod

Nipponacmea nigrans is a species of sea snail, a true limpet, a marine gastropod mollusk in the family Lottiidae, one of the families of true limpets.
