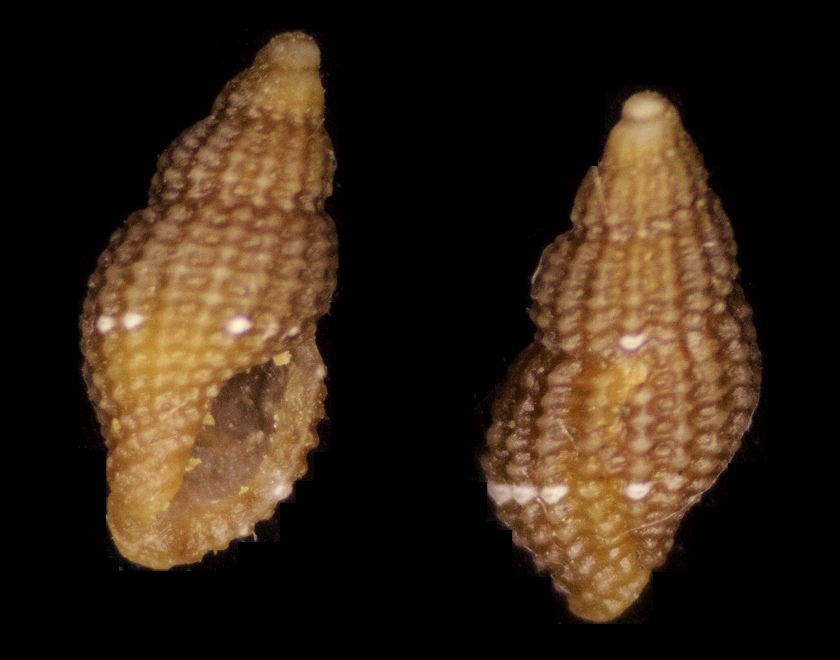
- Shell of Raphitoma laviae

Scientific classification
- Kingdom: Animalia
- Phylum: Mollusca
- Class: Gastropoda
- Subclass: Caenogastropoda
- Order: Neogastropoda
- Superfamily: Conoidea
- Family: Raphitomidae
- Genus: Raphitoma
- Species: R. laviae

Binomial name
- Raphitoma laviae (Philippi, 1844)

Synonyms
- Clathurella purpurea var. laviae Philippi, 1844; Philbertia laviae (Philippi, 1844) (superseded generic combination); Pleurotoma corbis Michaud, 1829; Pleurotoma laviae Philippi, 1844; Raphitoma intermedia F. Nordsieck, 1968; Raphitoma (Cyrtoides) rudis intermedia F. Nordsieck, 1968; Raphitoma purpurea laviae (Philippi, 1844)

= Raphitoma laviae =

Species of mollusc

Raphitoma laviae is a species of sea snail, a marine gastropod mollusc in the family Raphitomidae.

== Description ==
The length of the shell varies between 5 mm and 15 mm. The protoconch is multispiral.

(Original description) The reddish-brown shell has an oblong-fusiform shape. The six whorls show about 20 pronounced axial ribs, crossed by transverse riblets (about 5 in the upper whorls) forming a latticed structure. The aperture is oblong and is somewhat smaller than half the length of the shell. The outer lip is incrassate and notched within.

== Distribution ==
This species occurs in the Western and Central Mediterranean Sea.
