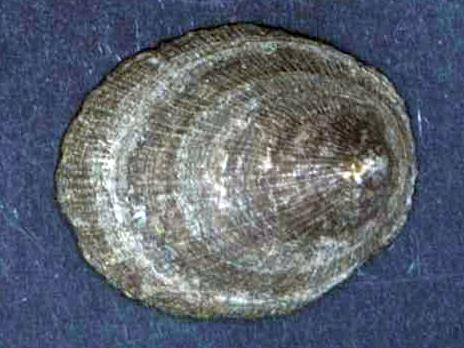

Scientific classification
- Kingdom: Animalia
- Phylum: Mollusca
- Class: Gastropoda
- Subclass: Patellogastropoda
- Family: Lottiidae
- Genus: Nipponacmea
- Species: N. concinna

Binomial name
- Nipponacmea concinna (Lischke, 1870)

Synonyms
- Acmaea (Notoacmea) concinna (Lischke, 1870); Acmaea concinna Lischke, 1870 (original combination); Notoacmea concinna (Lischke, 1870); Patelloida concinna (Lischke, 1870) (unaccepted combination); Tectura concinna (Lischke, 1870) (unaccepted combination)

= Nipponacmea concinna =

Species of gastropod

Nipponacmea concinna is a species of sea snail, a true limpet, a marine gastropod mollusk in the family Lottiidae, one of the families of true limpets.

== Distribution ==
This marine species occurs off Japan.
