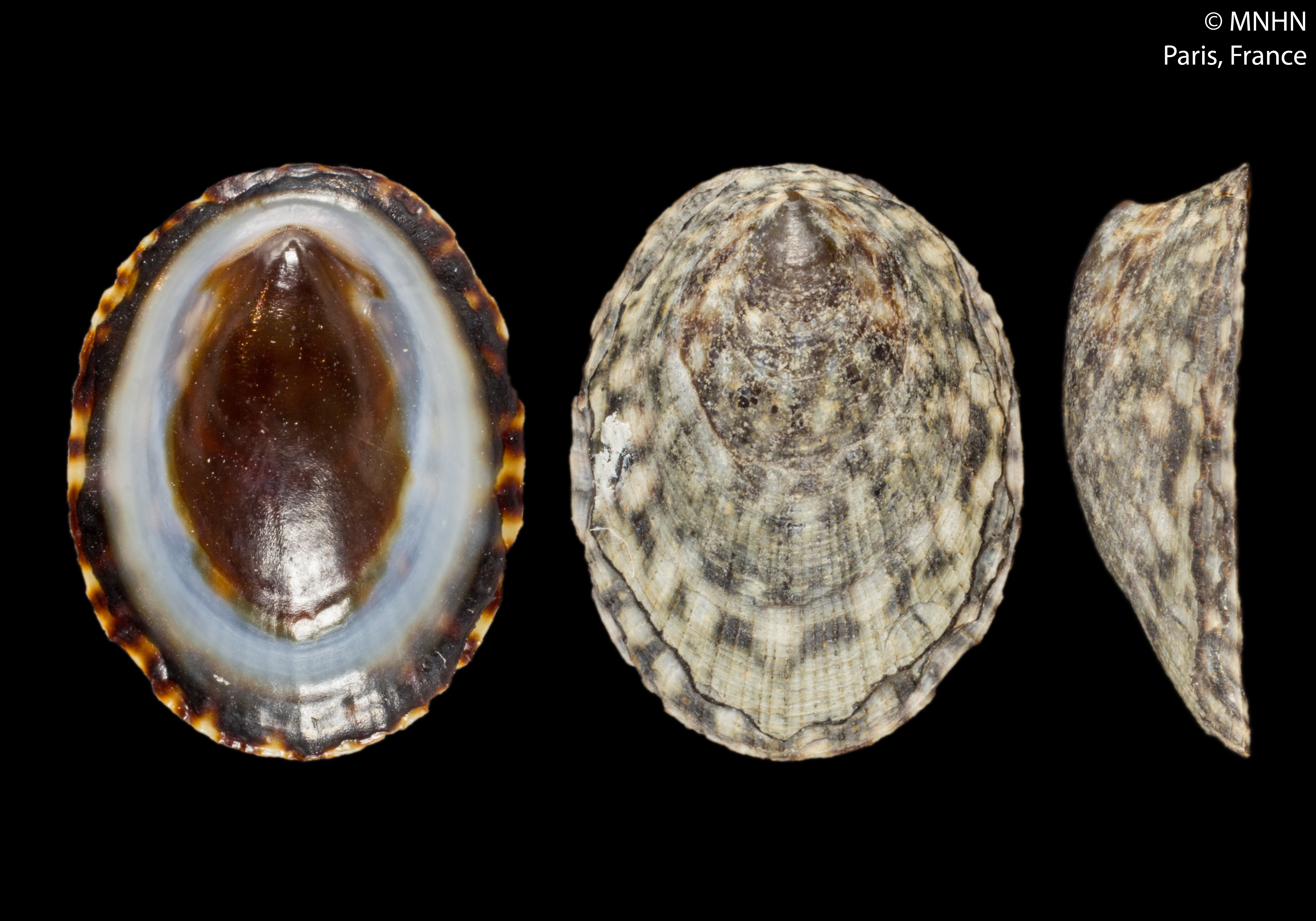
- Shell of Notoacmea pileopsis (neotype at MNHN, Paris)

Scientific classification
- Kingdom: Animalia
- Phylum: Mollusca
- Class: Gastropoda
- Subclass: Patellogastropoda
- Family: Lottiidae
- Genus: Notoacmea
- Species: N. pileopsis

Binomial name
- Notoacmea pileopsis (Quoy & Gaimard, 1834)

Synonyms
- Notoacmea (Notoacmea) pileopsis (Quoy & Gaimard, 1834)· accepted, alternate representation; Notoacmea (Notoacmea) pileopsis pileopsis (Quoy & Gaimard, 1834); Patelloida pileopsis Quoy & Gaimard, 1834)

= Notoacmea pileopsis =

Species of gastropod

Notoacmea pileopsis, commonly known as the black-edged limpet, is a species of sea snail or true limpet, a marine gastropod mollusc in the family Lottiidae, one of the families of true limpets.

== Subspecies ==
The following subspecies have been named within this species:

- Notoacmea pileopsis pileopsis (Quoy & Gaimard, 1834)
- Notoacmea pileopsis cellanoides (Oliver, 1926): synonym of Notoacmea cellanoides W. R. B. Oliver, 1926
- Notoacmea pileopsis sturnus (Hombron & Jacquinot, 1841): synonym of Notoacmea sturnus (Hombron & Jacquinot, 1841)

== Description ==
The length of the shell attains 14.7 mm.

== Distribution ==
This marine species occurs off New Zealand.
