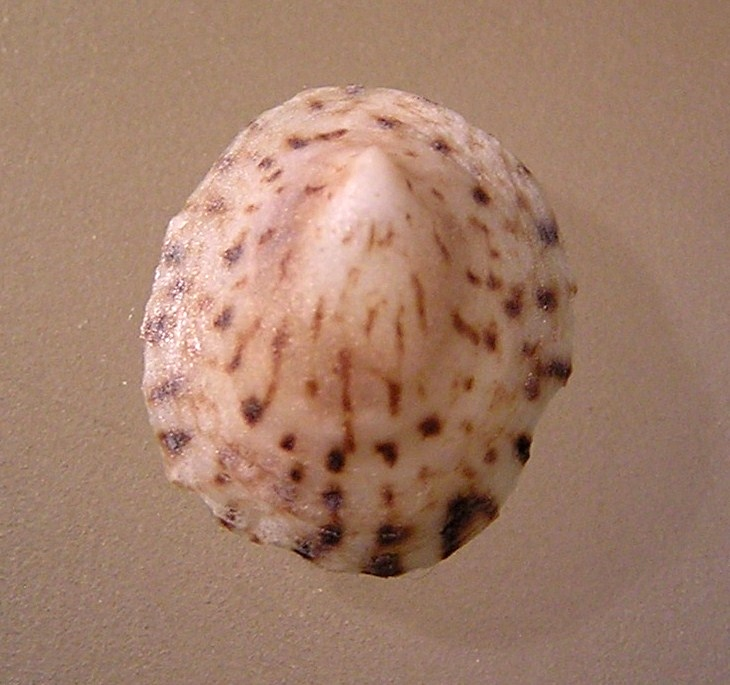

Scientific classification
- Kingdom: Animalia
- Phylum: Mollusca
- Class: Gastropoda
- Subclass: Patellogastropoda
- Family: Lottiidae
- Genus: Notoacmea
- Species: N. flammea

Binomial name
- Notoacmea flammea (Quoy & Gaimard, 1834)

Synonyms
- Acmaea scabrilirata Angas, 1865; Acmaea subundulata Angas, 1865; Chiazacmea flammea (Quoy & Gaimard, 1834); Notoacmea flammea diminuta Iredale, 1924; Notoacmea granulosa Macpherson, 1955 (junior synonym); Notoacmea mixta (Reeve, 1855); Notoacmaea scabrilirata Angas, 1865; Patella mixta Reeve, 1855; Patelloida flammea Quoy and Gaimard, 1834 (original description)

= Notoacmea flammea =

Species of gastropod

Notoacmea flammea is a species of sea snail, a true limpet, a marine gastropod mollusk in the family Lottiidae, one of the families of true limpets.

== Description ==
The length of the shell attains 11.2 mm.

== Distribution ==
This marine species occurs off Tasmania, Australia.

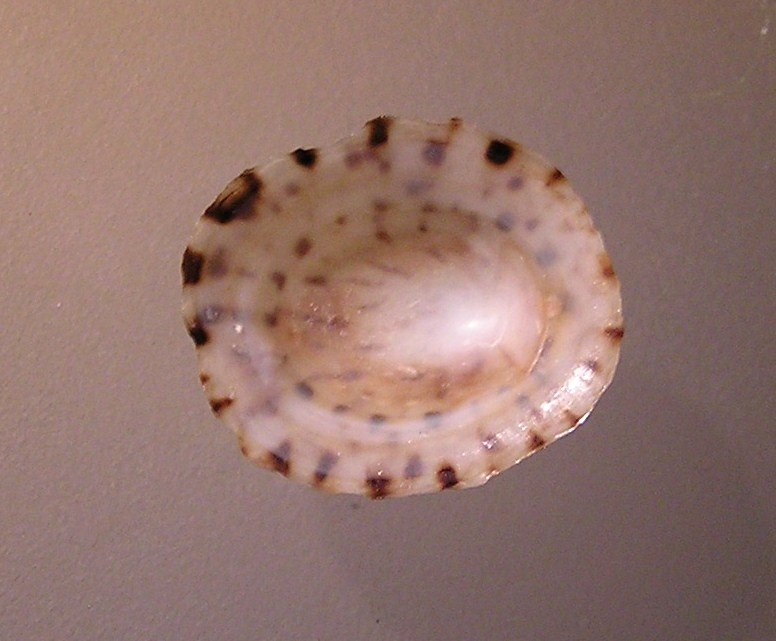
Basal view
