= Rosenscheldiella =

Scientific classification
- Kingdom: Fungi
- Division: Ascomycota
- Class: Dothideomycetes
- Order: Mycosphaerellales
- Family: Mycosphaerellaceae
- Genus: Rosenscheldiella; Theiss. & Syd.

Type species
- Rosenscheldiella styracis (Henn.) Theiss. & Syd.

Genus of fungi

Rosenscheldiella is a genus of fungi in the family Mycosphaerellaceae.

== Species ==
- R. brachyglottidis
- R. cinnamomi
- R. concentrica
- R. dysoxyli
- R. eugeniae
- R. heveae
- R. indica
- R. intermedia
- R. litseae
- R. oleariae
- R. perseae
- R. phoradendri
- R. pullulans
- R. pulverulenta
- R. rapaneae
- R. styracis
- R. tropaeoli
- R. ugandensis
