= Karl Emil Lischke =

German biologist and politician (1813–1886)

Karl Emil Lischke (30 December 1819, in Stettin – 14 January 1886, in Bonn) was a German lawyer, politician, diplomat, and amateur naturalist. He is best known for his contributions to malacology (study of molluscs).

Lischke was born in 1819 in Stettin, then a city in the Kingdom of Prussia, now the capital city of West Pomeranian Voivodeship, Poland. He studied law in Berlin, then returned to Stettin and was appointed a magistrate in 1840. In 1847 he served as a military attaché to the Prussian ambassador to the United States of America in Washington, D.C. Lischke was mayor of Elberfeld from 3 December 1850 to 1 January 1873.

Throughout his life Lischke maintained a keen interest in natural sciences, particularly in the study of molluscs. He was particularly interested in the mollusc species of Japan.

His daughter Emmy Lischke (1860-1919) was a German painter known for her landscapes and still lifes.
