= Radiacmea inconspicua =

Scientific classification
- Kingdom: Animalia
- Phylum: Mollusca
- Class: Gastropoda
- Subclass: Patellogastropoda
- Family: Lottiidae
- Genus: Radiacmea
- Species: R. inconspicua

Binomial name
- Radiacmea inconspicua (Gray, 1843)

Synonyms
- Acmaea cingulata Hutton, 1883; Acmaea rubiginosa Suter, 1913; Fissurella rubiginosa Hutton, 1873; Notoacmea inconspicua Gray, 1843; Patella inconspicua Gray, 1843

Species of gastropod

Radiacmea inconspicua is a species of small sea snail or true limpet, a marine gastropod mollusc in the family Lottiidae, one of the true limpet families.
