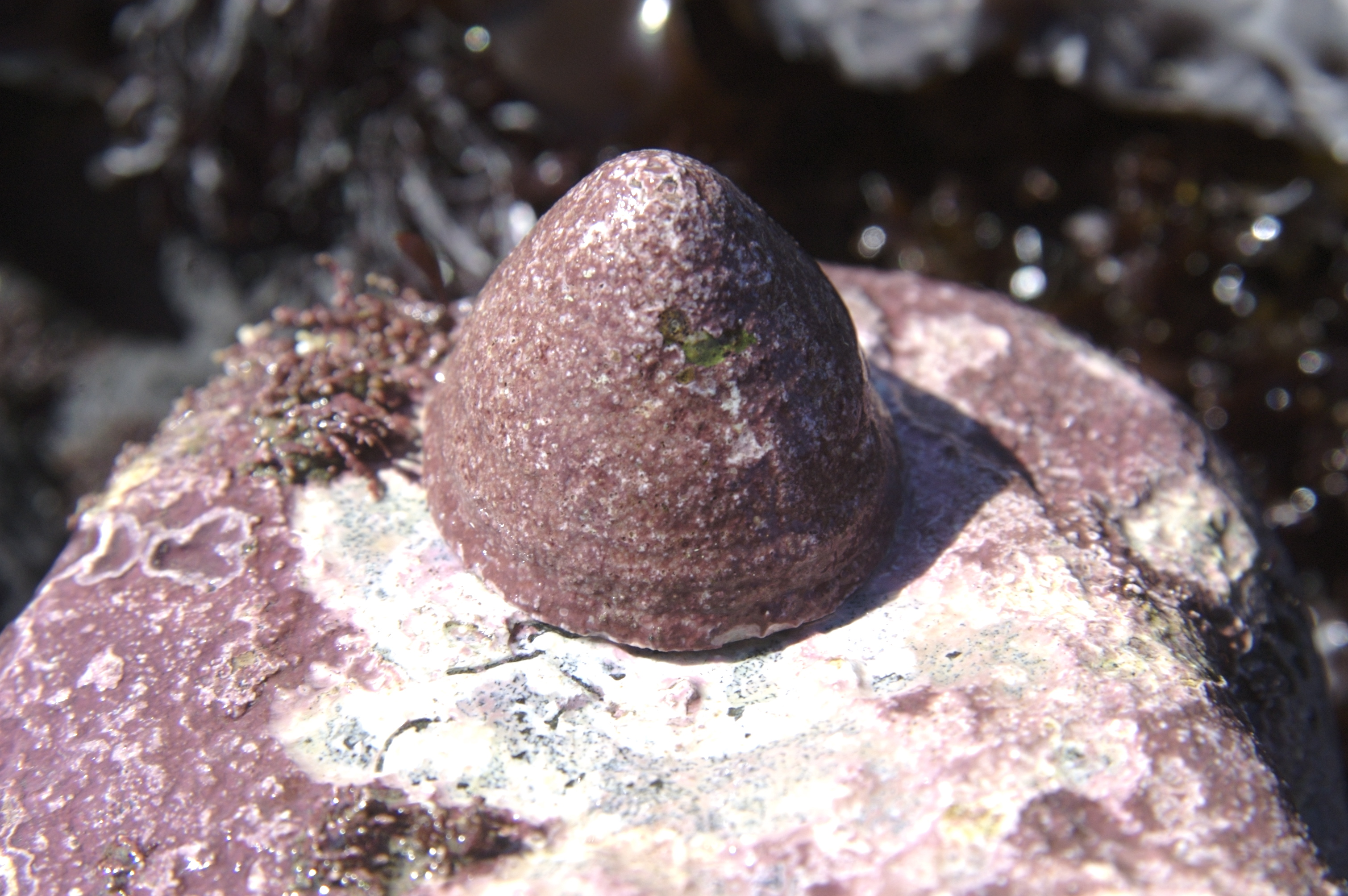
- Acmaea mitra shell

Scientific classification
- Kingdom: Animalia
- Phylum: Mollusca
- Class: Gastropoda
- Subclass: Patellogastropoda
- Superfamily: Lottioidea
- Family: Acmaeidae
- Genus: Acmaea; Eschscholtz, 1833

Synonyms
- Acmea [sic] misspelling; Patella (Acmaea) Eschscholtz, 1833 ·

= Acmaea =

Genus of gastropods

Acmaea is a genus of sea snails, specifically true limpets, marine gastropod mollusks in the family Acmaeidae, one of the families of true limpets.

== Description ==
The solid shel is patelliform. The apex is erect or anteriorly inclined. The shells may exhibit radial ridges or concentric growth lines.

Animal: The muzzle is frilled and produced at the lower anterior corners into two lappets or tubercles. There is no marginal cordon. The cervical gill alone is present.

== Distribution ==
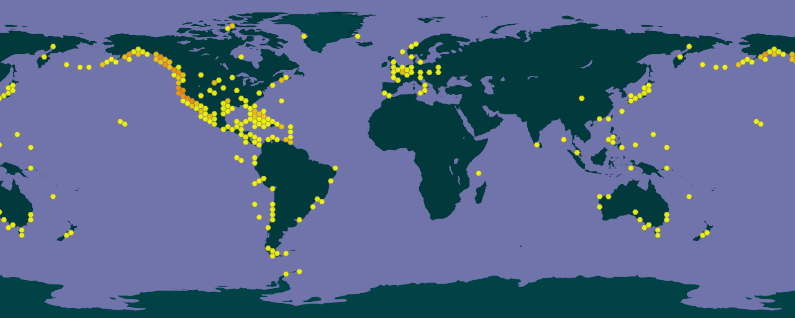
Distribution

Species of Acmaea are widely distributed throughout temperate and subtropical coastal regions worldwide, with particularly high diversity in the Pacific and Atlantic Oceans.

== Species ==
According to the World Register of Marine Species (WoRMS), the following species with accepted names are included within the genus Acmaea :

- Acmaea achates (Reeve, 1855)
- † Acmaea dubia Wilckens, 1910
- † Acmaea dulcis (Lamarck, 1803)
- Acmaea juanina Odhner, 1922
- † Acmaea marceauxi (Deshayes, 1861)
- Acmaea mitra Rathke, 1833
- Acmaea nanshaensis Liu, 1991
- † Acmaea scutatella (Lamarck, 1803)
- † Acmaea submesidia Stilwell, Zinsmeister & Oleinik, 2004
- † Acmaea vokesi Hickman, 1980

Taxa inquirenda

- Acmaea cancellata Test, 1945
- Acmaea concreta S. S. Berry, 1963
- Acmaea cornea Test, 1945
- Acmaea fouae Test, 1945
- Acmaea gabatella S. S. Berry, 1960
- Acmaea goodmani S. S. Berry, 1960
- Acmaea irregularis Test, 1945
- Acmaea mitella Menke, 1847 (uncertain, status not researched)
- Acmaea multistriata W. H. Turton, 1932
- Acmaea neglecta Schepman, 1908
- Acmaea pileolus (Middendorff, 1848)
- Acmaea transparens Test, 1945

== Species brought into synonymy ==
- Acmaea (Tectura) Gray, 1847 : synonym of Tectura Gray, 1847 (alternate representation)
- Acmaea (Chiazacmea): synonym of Notoacmea Iredale, 1915
- Acmaea (Collisella) Dall, 1871: synonym of Lottia Gray, 1833
- Acmaea (Niveotectura) pallida (A. Gould, 1859): synonym of Niveotectura pallida (A. Gould, 1859) (unaccepted combination)
- Acmaea albonotata E. A. Smith, 1901: synonym of Eoacmaea albonotata (E. A. Smith, 1901)
- Acmaea aleutica Dall, 1927: synonym of Erginus apicinus (Dall, 1879)
- Acmaea antillarum (G. B. Sowerby I, 1834): synonym of Lottia antillarum G. B. Sowerby I, 1834
- Acmaea apicina Dall, 1879: synonym of Erginus apicinus (Dall, 1879)
- Acmaea araucana (d'Orbigny, 1839): synonym of Scurria araucana (d'Orbigny, 1839)
- Acmaea bombayana E. A. Smith, 1911: synonym of Cellana radiata (Born, 1778)
- Acmaea cassis Rathke, 1833: synonym of Lottia pelta (Rathke, 1833)
- Acmaea ceciliana (Pilsbry, 1891): synonym of Scurria ceciliana (d'Orbigny, 1841)
- Acmaea chathamensis Pilsbry, 1891: synonym of Cellana rota (Gmelin, 1791)
- Acmaea coffea (Dall, 1909): synonym of Scurria variabilis (G. B. Sowerby I, 1839)
- Acmaea cona Test, 1945: synonym of Lottia cona (Test, 1945)
- Acmaea curvissior Oberling, 1970: synonym of Williamia gussoni (Costa O. G., 1829)
- Acmaea cymbula (Hupé, 1854): synonym of Scurria scurra (Lesson, 1831)
- Acmaea daedala Suter, 1907: synonym of Notoacmea daedala (Suter, 1907)
- Acmaea dalliana Pilsbry, 1891: synonym of Lottia dalliana (Pilsbry, 1891)
- Acmaea dorsuosa Gould, 1859: synonym of Lottia dorsuosa (Gould, 1859)
- Acmaea eccentrica Test, 1945: synonym of Propilidium tasmanicum (Pilsbry, 1895)
- Acmaea edmitchelli Lipps, 1966: synonym of Lottia edmitchelli (Lipps, 1966)
- Acmaea elegans Philippi, 1846: synonym of Lottia antillarum G. B. Sowerby I, 1834
- Acmaea euglypta Dautzenberg & H. Fischer, 1897: synonym of Veleropilina euglypta (Dautzenberg & H. Fischer, 1897)
- Acmaea fergusoni Wheat, 1913: synonym of Testudinalia testudinalis (O. F. Müller, 1776)
- Acmaea gallensis Winckworth, 1928: synonym of Lottia tranquebarica (Gmelin, 1791)
- Acmaea garrettii Pilsbry, 1891: synonym of Patelloida garrettii (Pilsbry, 1891)
- Acmaea hamillei P. Fischer, 1857: synonym of Plesiothyreus hamillei (P. Fischer, 1857)
- Acmaea helmsi E. A. Smith, 1894: synonym of Notoacmea elongata (Quoy & Gaimard, 1834)
- Acmaea heroldi Dunker, 1861: synonym of Patelloida heroldi (Dunker, 1861)
- Acmaea inconspicua (Gray, 1843): synonym of Radiacmea inconspicua (Gray, 1843)
- Acmaea insessa (Hinds, 1842): synonym of Lottia insessa (Hinds, 1842)
- Acmaea instabilis (Gould, 1846): synonym of Lottia instabilis (Gould, 1846)
- Acmaea kuragiensis Yokoyama, 1920: synonym of Cryptobranchia kuragiensis (Yokoyama, 1920)
- Acmaea leucophaea (Philippi, 1846): synonym of Scurria variabilis (G. B. Sowerby I, 1839)
- Acmaea leucopleura (Gmelin, 1791): synonym of Lottia leucopleura (Gmelin, 1791)
- Acmaea limatula (Carpenter, 1864): synonym of Lottia limatula (Carpenter, 1864)
- Acmaea maraisi Kilburn, 1977: synonym of Patelloida maraisi (Kilburn, 1977)
- Acmaea mesoleuca Menke, 1851: synonym of Lottia mesoleuca (Menke, 1851)
- Acmaea minutissima E. A. Smith, 1904: synonym of Cocculinella minutissima (E. A. Smith, 1904)
- Acmaea mitchelli Lipps, 1963: synonym of Lottia edmitchelli (Lipps, 1966)
- Acmaea nisoria (Philippi, 1846): synonym of Scurria variabilis (G. B. Sowerby I, 1839)
- Acmaea oblongata Yokoyama, 1926: synonym of Siphonacmea oblongata (Yokoyama, 1926)
- Acmaea ochracea (Dall, 1871): synonym of Lottia instabilis (Gould, 1846)
- Acmaea paleacea (Gould, 1853): synonym of Tectura paleacea (Gould, 1853)
- Acmaea paradigitalis Fritchman, 1960: synonym of Lottia paradigitalis (Fritchman, 1960)
- Acmaea parasitica (Thiem, 1917): synonym of Scurria variabilis (G. B. Sowerby I, 1839)
- Acmaea pelta Rathke, 1833: synonym of Lottia pelta (Rathke, 1833)
- Acmaea persona Rathke, 1833: synonym of Lottia persona (Rathke, 1833)
- Acmaea plana (Pilippi, 1846): synonym of Scurria plana (Philippi, 1846)
- Acmaea profunda (Deshayes): synonym of Eoacmaea profunda (Deshayes, 1863)
- Acmaea pseudocorticata Iredale, 1908: synonym of Patelloida corticata (Hutton, 1880)
- Acmaea puncturata (Lamarck, 1819): synonym of Eoacmaea pustulata (Helbling, 1779)
- Acmaea pustulata (Helbling, 1779): synonym of Eoacmaea pustulata (Helbling, 1779)
- Acmaea radiata Rathke, 1833: synonym of Lottia persona (Rathke, 1833)
- Acmaea rosea Dall, 1872: synonym of Rhodopetala rosea (Dall, 1872)
- Acmaea rubella: synonym of Erginus rubellus (O. Fabricius, 1780)
- Acmaea saccharina (Linnaeus, 1758): synonym of Patelloida saccharina (Linnaeus, 1758)
- Acmaea scutum Rathke, 1833: synonym of Lottia scutum (Rathke, 1833)
- Acmaea semicornea Preston, 1908: synonym of Trimusculus semicorneus (Preston, 1908)
- Acmaea semirubida Dall, 1914: synonym of Eoacmaea semirubida (Dall, 1914)
- Acmaea striata (Quoy & Gaimard, 1834): synonym of Patelloida striata Quoy & Gaimard, 1834
- Acmaea strigatella Carpenter, 1864: synonym of Lottia strigatella (Carpenter, 1864)
- Acmaea tessulata (O. F. Müller, 1776): synonym of Testudinalia tessulata (O. F. Müller, 1776): synonym of Testudinalia testudinalis (O. F. Müller, 1776)
- Acmaea testudinalis (O. F. Müller, 1776): synonym of Testudinalia testudinalis (O. F. Müller, 1776)
- Acmaea travancorica Preston, 1911: synonym of Cellana radiata (Born, 1778)
- Acmaea unicolor (Forbes, 1844): synonym of Tectura virginea (O. F. Müller, 1776)
- Acmaea variabilis (Pilsbry, 1891): synonym of Scurria variabilis (G. B. Sowerby I, 1839)
- Acmaea virginea (Müller O. F., 1776): synonym of Tectura virginea (O. F. Müller, 1776)
- Acmaea viridula (Pilsbry, 1891): synonym of Scurria viridula (Lamarck, 1822)
- Acmaea wottonae Christiaens, 1975: synonym of Lottia antillarum G. B. Sowerby I, 1834
- Acmaea zografi Dautzenberg & H. Fischer, 1896: synonym of Veleropilina zografi (Dautzenberg & H. Fischer, 1896)
