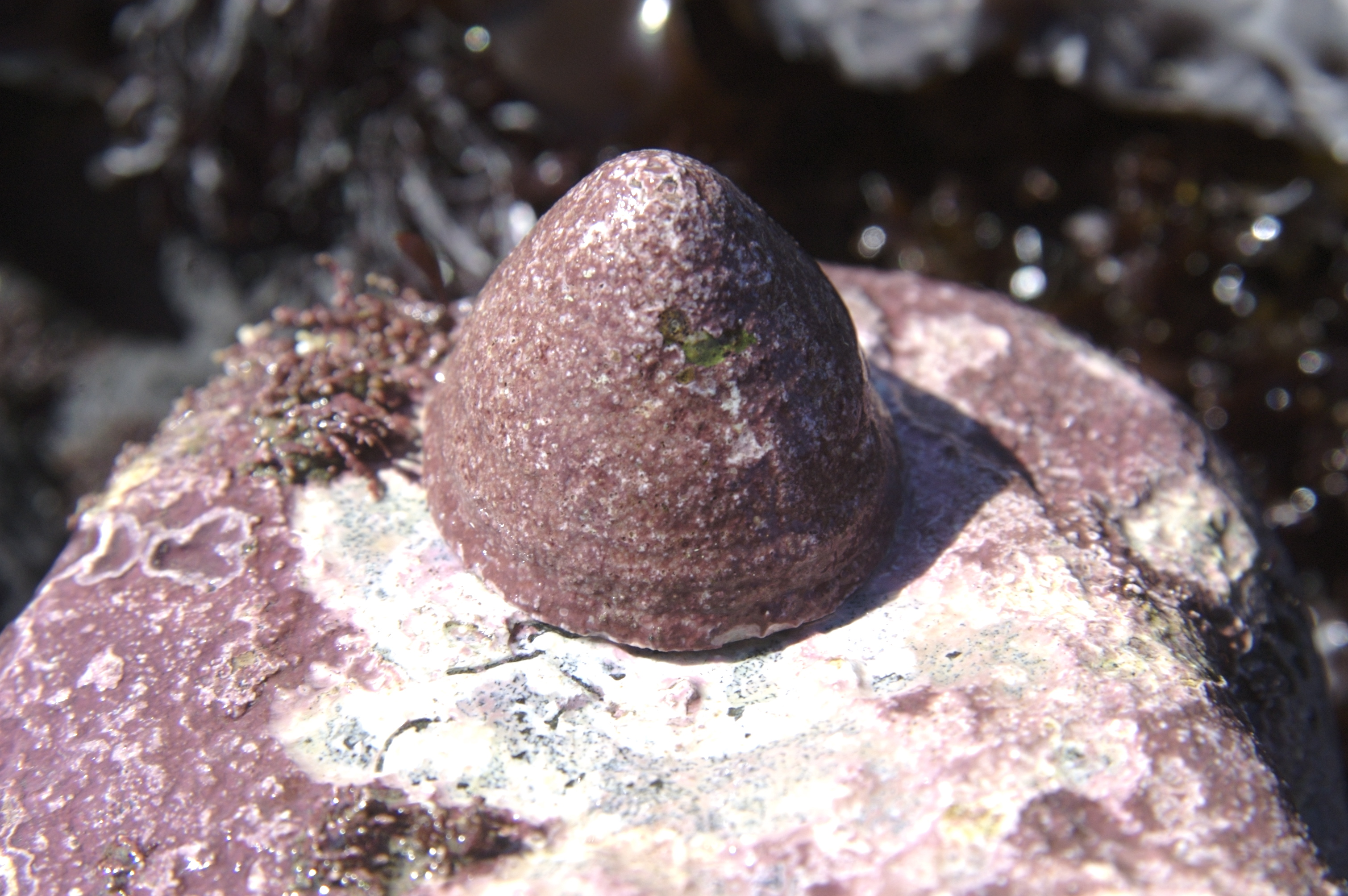
- A live individual of Acmaea mitra. The shell is covered in encrusting red coralline algae, which is why it appears to be pink

Scientific classification
- Kingdom: Animalia
- Phylum: Mollusca
- Class: Gastropoda
- Subclass: Patellogastropoda
- Superfamily: Lottioidea
- Family: Acmaeidae
- Genus: Acmaea
- Species: A. mitra

Binomial name
- Acmaea mitra Rathke, 1833

Synonyms
- Scurria mitra (Rathke, 1833) superseded combination

= Acmaea mitra =

Species of gastropod

Acmaea mitra, common name the whitecap limpet, is a species of sea snail or true limpet, a marine gastropod mollusc in the family Acmaeidae, one of the families of true limpets.

== Taxonomy ==
Acmaea mitra was placed in the family Acmaeidae for many years, but based on molecular phylogeny evidence by Nakano & Ozawa (2007), Acmaeidae was synonymized with Lottiidae. However, this synonymy was subsequently found incorrect, having been the result of contaminated samples, and Acmaea mitra and a related species, Niveotectura pallida form a well-supported clade outside of the Lottiidae, and Acmaeidae was re-established.

Acmaea mitra is the type of the genus Acmaea.

== Description ==
The length of the shell varies between 12 mm and 38 mm.

== Distribution ==
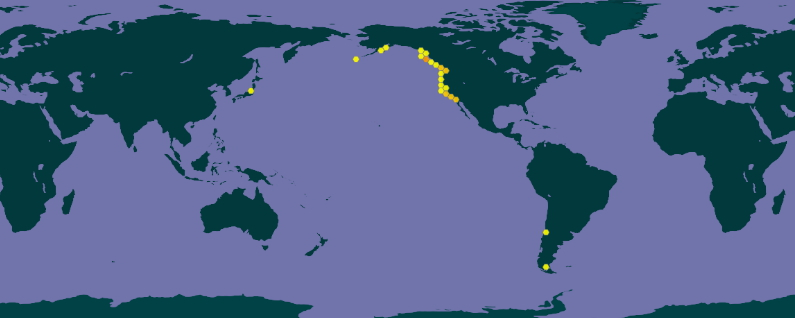
Distribution

This species occurs in the Pacific Ocean between Alaska and Baja California, Mexico.
