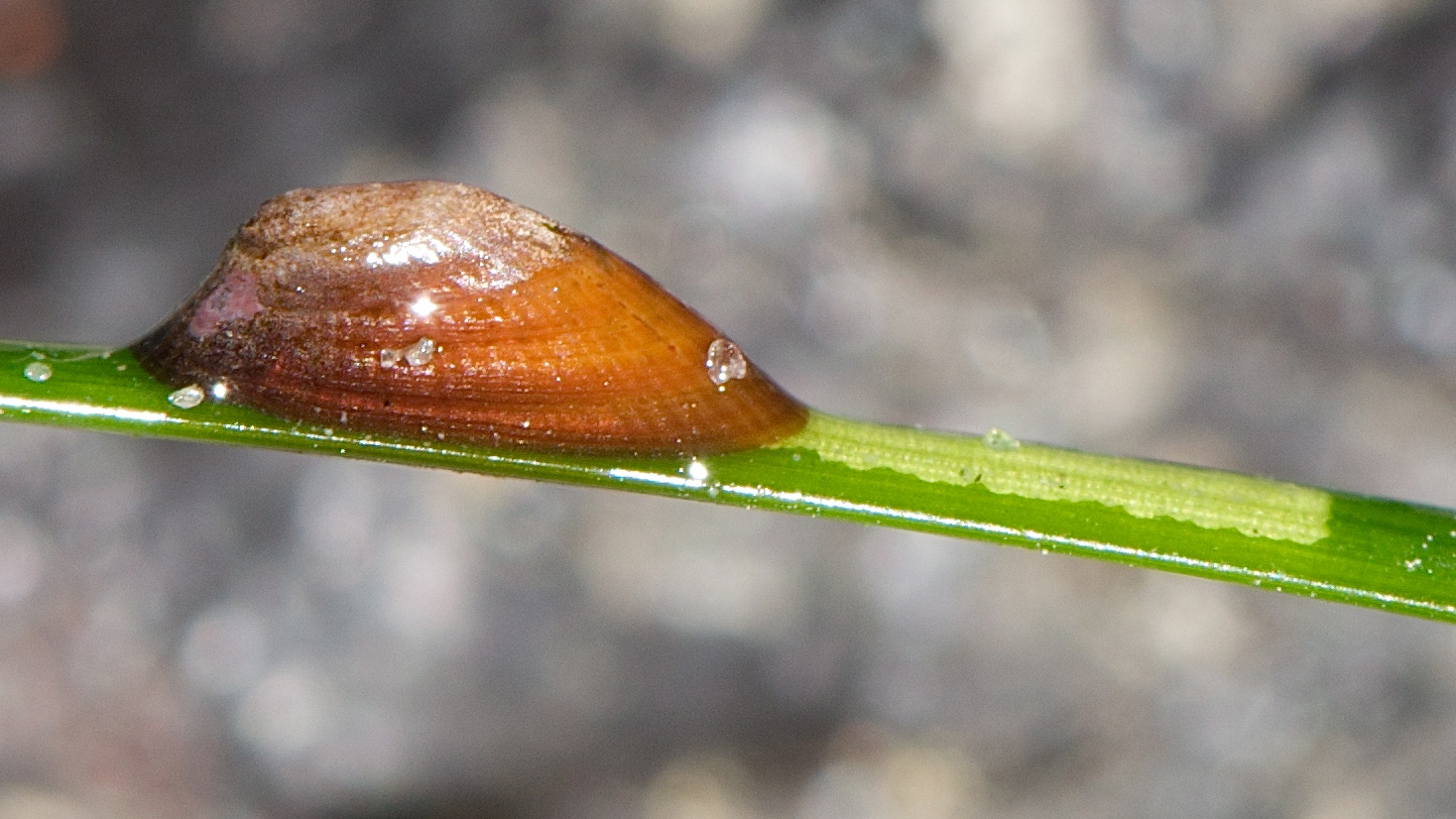
- A live individual of Tectura palacea on a blade of Phyllospadix seagrass

Scientific classification
- Kingdom: Animalia
- Phylum: Mollusca
- Class: Gastropoda
- Subclass: Patellogastropoda
- Superfamily: Lottioidea
- Family: Lottiidae
- Subfamily: Tecturinae
- Genus: Tectura; Gray, 1847

Type species
- Patella parva da Costa, 1778

Synonyms
- Acmaea (Tectura) Gray, 1847

= Tectura =

Genus of gastropods

Tectura is a genus of small to medium-sized sea snails, true limpets, marine gastropod molluscs in the family Lottiidae. Tectura comes from Latin tegō ("I cover").

== Species ==
Species in the genus Tectura include:

- Tectura depicta (Hinds, 1842)
- Tectura filosa (Carpenter, 1865)
- Tectura palacea (Gould, 1853)
- Tectura pusilla Jeffreys, 1883
- Tectura rosacea (Carpenter, 1864)
- Tectura tenera (C. B. Adams, 1845)
- Tectura virginea (Müller, 1776) - white tortoiseshell limpet

Species brought into synonymy

- Tectura antillarum (Sowerby I, 1831): synonym of Lottia antillarum G. B. Sowerby I, 1834
- Tectura coppingeri E. A. Smith, 1881: synonym of Iothia emarginuloides (Philippi, 1868)
- Tectura fenestrata (Reeve, 1855): synonym of Lottia fenestrata (Reeve, 1855)
- Tectura fluviatilis Blanford, 1867: synonym of Potamacmaea fluviatilis (Blanford, 1867)
- Tectura fulva (Müller O.F., 1776): synonym of Iothia fulva (O. F. Müller, 1776)
- Tectura persona (Rathke, 1833): synonym of Lottia persona (Rathke, 1833)
- Tectura radiata Pease, 1860: synonym of Williamia radiata (Pease, 1860)
- Tectura reticulata Seguenza, 1876: synonym of Veleropilina reticulata (Seguenza, 1876)
- Tectura rugosa Jeffreys, 1883: synonym of Iothia fulva (O. F. Müller, 1776)
- Tectura scutum Eschscholtz, 1833: synonym of Lottia scutum (Rathke, 1833)
- Tectura tahitensis Pease, 1868: synonym of Cellana taitensis (Röding, 1798)
- Tectura tessulata (O. F. Müller, 1776): synonym of Testudinalia testudinalis (O. F. Müller, 1776)
- Tectura testudinalis (O. F. Müller, 1776)- Common tortoiseshell limpet : synonym of the accepted name Testudinalia testudinalis (Müller, 1776)
