= Acmaea nanshaensis =

Scientific classification
- Kingdom: Animalia
- Phylum: Mollusca
- Class: Gastropoda
- Subclass: Patellogastropoda
- Family: Acmaeidae
- Genus: Acmaea
- Species: A. nanshaensis

Binomial name
- Acmaea nanshaensis Y.-Y. Liu, 1991

Species of gastropod

Acmaea nanshaensis is a species of sea snail or true limpet, a marine gastropod mollusc in the family Acmaeidae, one of the families of true limpets.

== Distribution ==
This marine species occurs off Nansha Islands, China and the Philippines.
