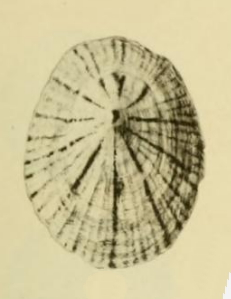
- Shell of Acmaea juanina (holotype) - top view

Scientific classification
- Kingdom: Animalia
- Phylum: Mollusca
- Class: Gastropoda
- Subclass: Patellogastropoda
- Family: Acmaeidae
- Genus: Acmaea
- Species: A. juanina

Binomial name
- Acmaea juanina Odhner, 1922

= Acmaea juanina =

Species of gastropod

Acmaea juanina is a species of sea snail or true limpet, a marine gastropod mollusc in the family Acmaeidae, one of the families of true limpets.

== Description ==
(Original description) The ovate shell is of moderate height with its apex in the first third of its length. The anterior and lateral slopes are straight, the posterior one a little convex.

The sculpture consists of concentric striae and radiating ribs of alternating strength, 11 principal ones with finer ones in the interstices. The coarsest ribs (4 in front, I on each side and 5 behind the apex) as well as the apex are dark-violet in colour, olive-brown towards the periphery like the intervening ribs. The ground is white. The interior of the shell is white, with a chestnut centre and an olive-green margin.

== Distribution ==
This marine species occurs in the Pacific Ocean off Juan Fernandez and Desventuradas, Chile.
