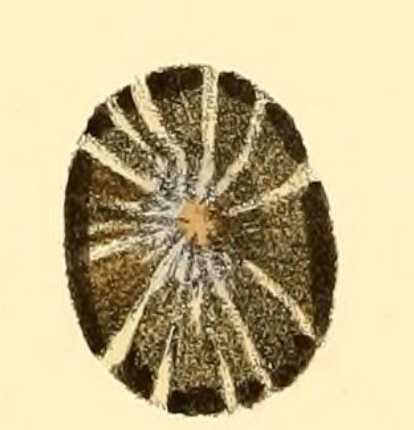
- Drawing of a shell of Acmaea achates (holotype)

Scientific classification
- Kingdom: Animalia
- Phylum: Mollusca
- Class: Gastropoda
- Subclass: Patellogastropoda
- Family: Acmaeidae
- Genus: Acmaea
- Species: A. achates

Binomial name
- Acmaea achates (Reeve, 1855)
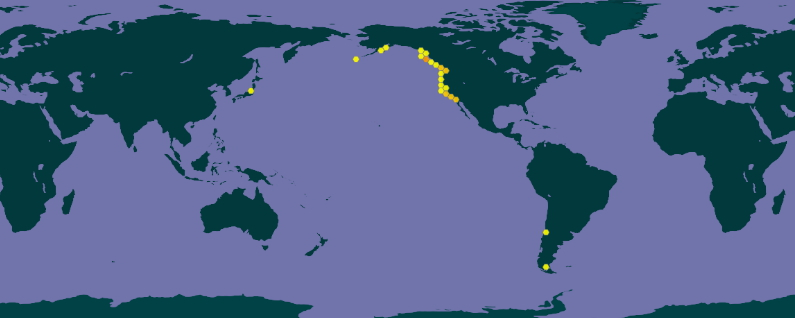

Synonyms
- Patella achates Reeve, 1855 (original combination)

= Acmaea achates =

Species of gastropod

Acmaea achates is a species of sea snail or true limpet, a marine gastropod mollusc in the family Acmaeidae, one of the families of true limpets.

== Description ==
The ovate shell is rather thin. It is convexly depressed, radiately densely striated with the striae here and there finely corded. The shell is intense black, irregularly variegated with lightning-marked white rays. The interior is bluish, with a broad black variegated border.

== Distribution ==
This marine species occurs off India.
