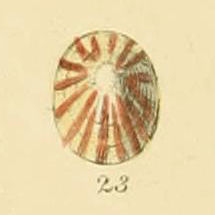

Scientific classification
- Kingdom: Animalia
- Phylum: Mollusca
- Class: Gastropoda
- Subclass: Patellogastropoda
- Family: Lottiidae
- Genus: Tectura
- Species: T. virginea

Binomial name
- Tectura virginea (Müller, 1776)

Synonyms
- Acmaea virginea (Müller, 1776) (currently placed in genus Tectura); Patella pulchella Forbes, 1835; Patella parva da Costa, 1778

= Tectura virginea =

Species of gastropod

Tectura virginea is a species of sea snail, a true limpet, a marine gastropod mollusc in the family Lottiidae, one of the families of true limpets. It is commonly known as the white tortoiseshell limpet.

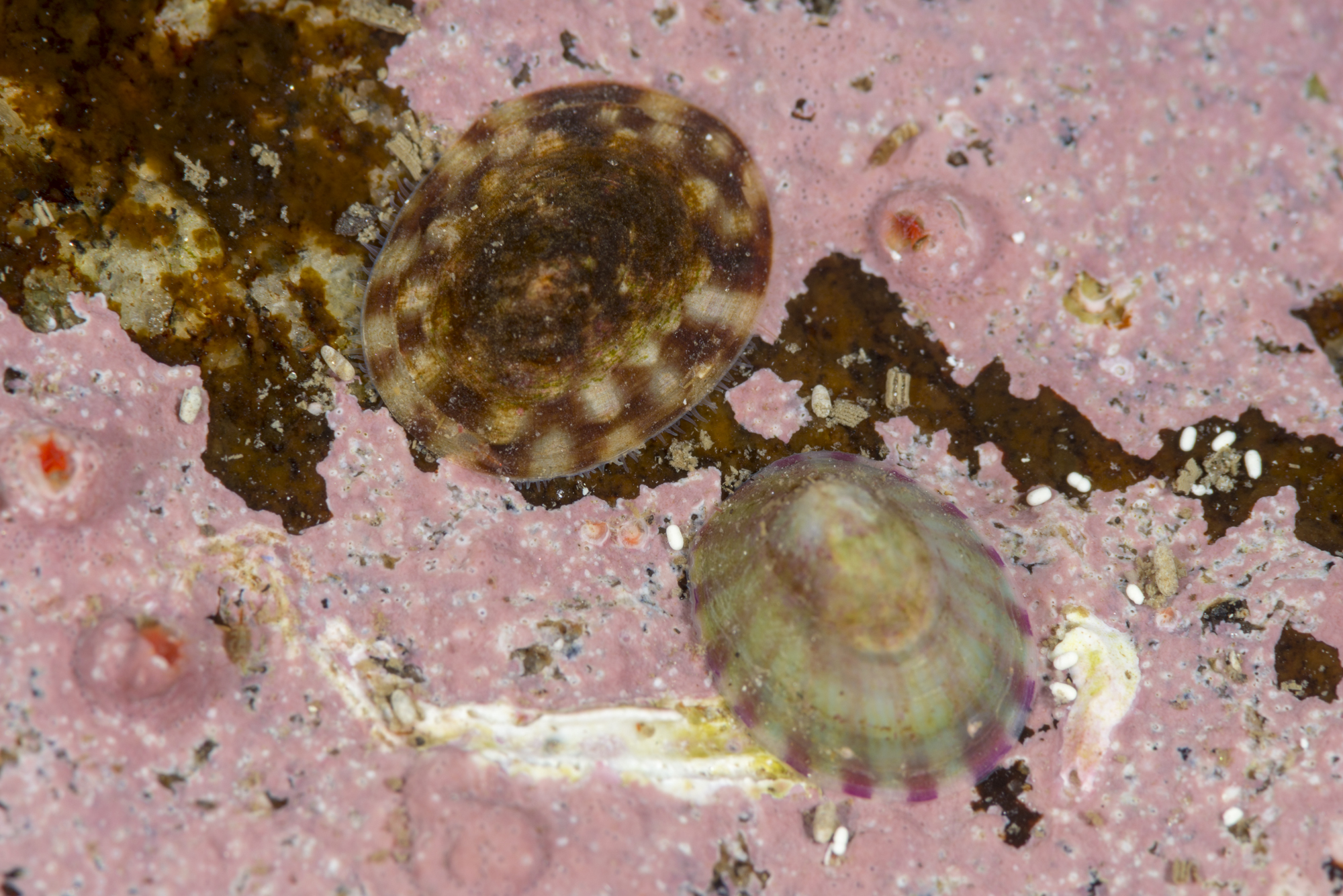
The limpets Testudinalia testudinalis and Tectura virginea, infralittoral zone, Bodø, Norway.

== Description ==
Tectura virginea is rather smaller than Testudinalia testudinalis, the tortoiseshell limpet, growing to 15mm in length with a height of 6mm. The shell is white with purplish bands radiating from the apex. which is tilted forward and about a third of the way along the shell. The flesh is creamy coloured or pale pink. The broad foot is oval and the head bears a pair of long tentacles with tiny black eyes located near their base.

== Distribution and habitat ==
The white tortoiseshell limpet is found on the north west coasts of Europe from Norway south to the Mediterranean Sea including the North Sea. It lives in the neritic zone below low water mark down to a depth of about one hundred metres. It favours rock pools and smooth rock covered with encrusting red algae such as Lithothamnion on which it feeds.
