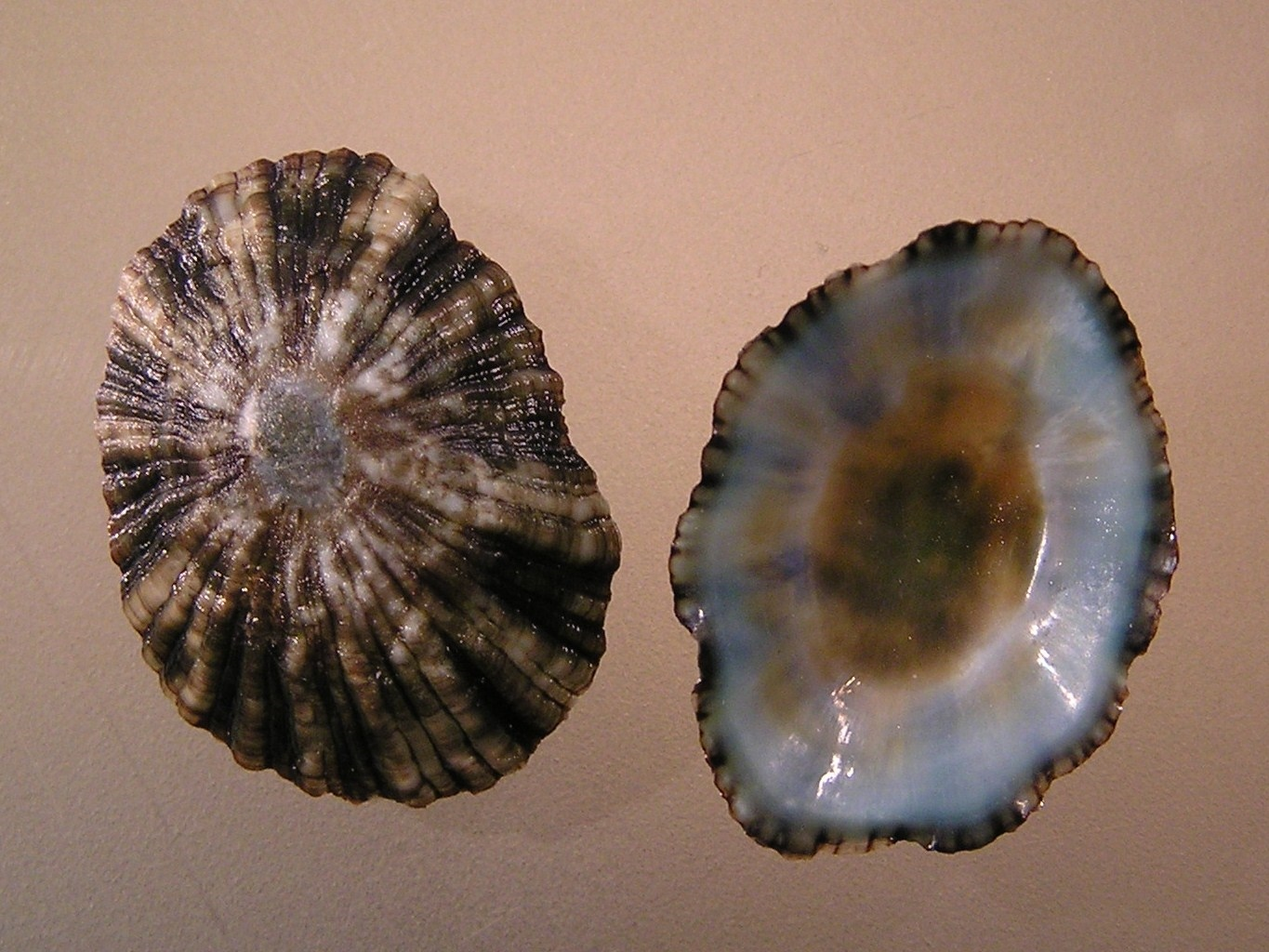
- shells of Scurria stipulata

Scientific classification
- Kingdom: Animalia
- Phylum: Mollusca
- Class: Gastropoda
- Subclass: Patellogastropoda
- Family: Lottiidae
- Subfamily: Lottiinae
- Tribe: Lottiini
- Genus: Scurria; Gray, 1847

= Scurria =

Genus of gastropods

Scurria is a genus of sea snails, the true limpets, marine gastropod mollusks in the subfamily Lottiinae of the family Lottiidae.

== Species ==
Species within the genus Scurria include:

- Scurria araucana (d'Orbigny, 1839)
- Scurria bahamondina (Ramirez-Bohme, 1974)
- † Scurria bicanaliculata Trautschold, 1866
- Scurria ceciliana (d'Orbigny, 1841)
- Scurria chaitena (Ramirez-Bohme, 1974)
- Scurria dalcahuina (Ramirez-Bohme, 1974)
- † Scurria impressa Gerasimov, 1955
- Scurria plana (Philippi, 1846)
- † Scurria rieae Schnetler & M. S. Nielsen, 2018
- Scurria scurra (Lesson, 1841)
- Scurria silvana (Ramirez-Bohme, 1974)
- Scurria stipulata (Reeve, 1855)
- Scurria variabilis (G. B. Sowerby I, 1839)
- Scurria viridula (Lamarck, 1822)
- Scurria zebrina (Lesson, 1830)

Species brought into synonymy

- Scurria mesoleuca (Menke, 1851): synonym of Lottia mesoleuca (Menke, 1851)
- Scurria parasitica (d'Orbigny, 1841): synonym of Scurria variabilis (G. B. Sowerby I, 1839) (junior synonym)
- Scurria scurra (Dall, 1909): synonym of Scurria scurra (Lesson, 1831)
- Scurria viridula (Thiem, 1917): synonym of Scurria viridula (Lamarck, 1822)
