= Scurria dalcahuina =

Scientific classification
- Kingdom: Animalia
- Phylum: Mollusca
- Class: Gastropoda
- Subclass: Patellogastropoda
- Family: Lottiidae
- Genus: Scurria
- Species: S. dalcahuina

Binomial name
- Scurria dalcahuina (Ramirez-Bohme, 1974)

Species of gastropod

Scurria dalcahuina is a species of sea snail, a true limpet, a marine gastropod mollusk in the family Lottiidae, one of the families of true limpets.
