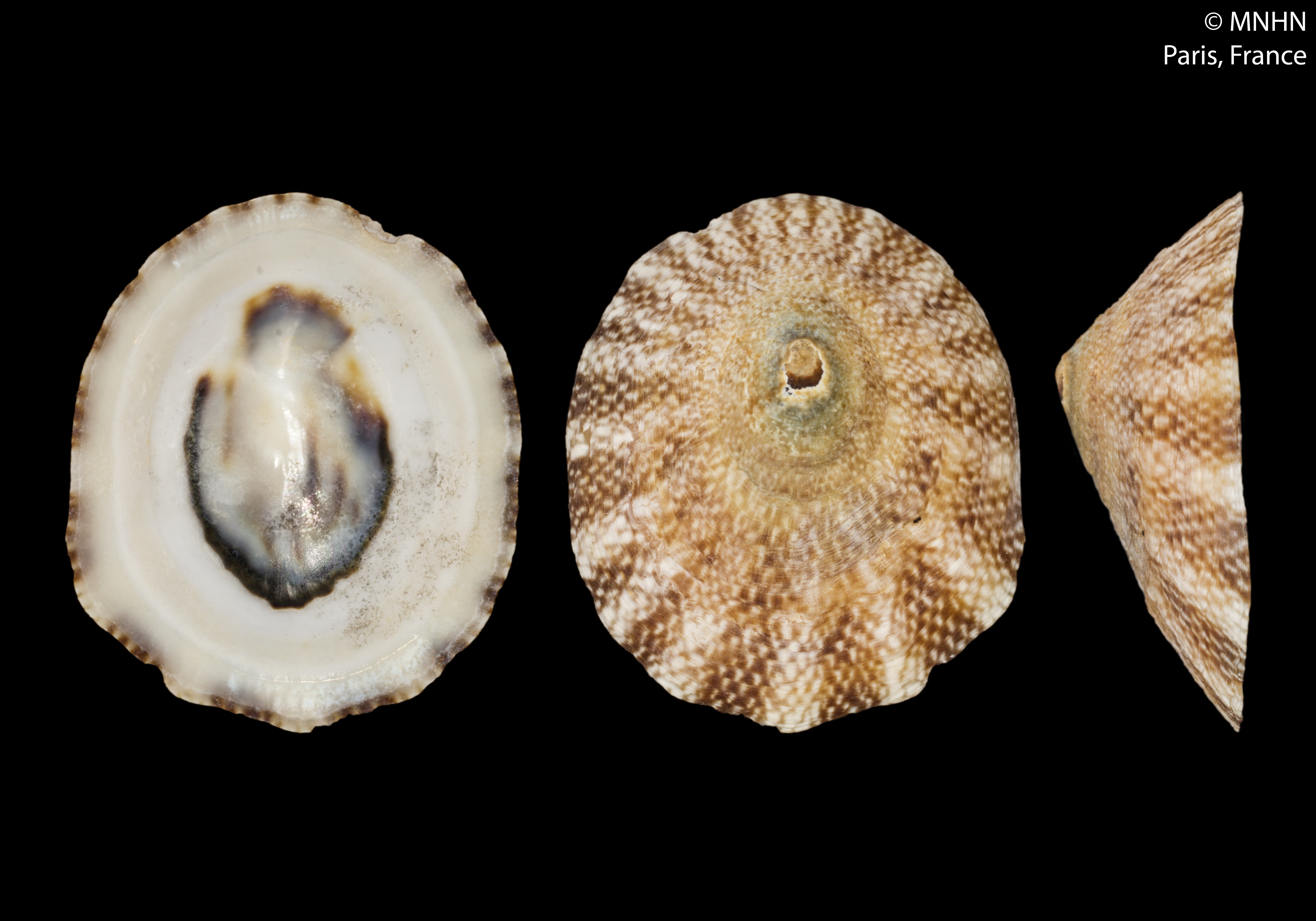
- Shell of Scurria zebrina (syntype at MNHN, Paris)

Scientific classification
- Kingdom: Animalia
- Phylum: Mollusca
- Class: Gastropoda
- Subclass: Patellogastropoda
- Family: Lottiidae
- Genus: Scurria
- Species: S. zebrina

Binomial name
- Scurria zebrina (Lesson, 1830)

Synonyms
- Collisella zebrina (Lesson, 1831); Patella zebrina Lesson, 1831 (original description)

= Scurria zebrina =

Species of gastropod

Scurria zebrina is a species of sea snail, a true limpet, a marine gastropod mollusk in the family Lottiidae, one of the families of true limpets.

== Description ==
The length of the shell attains 21.3 mm.

== Distribution ==
This marine species occurs off Chile.

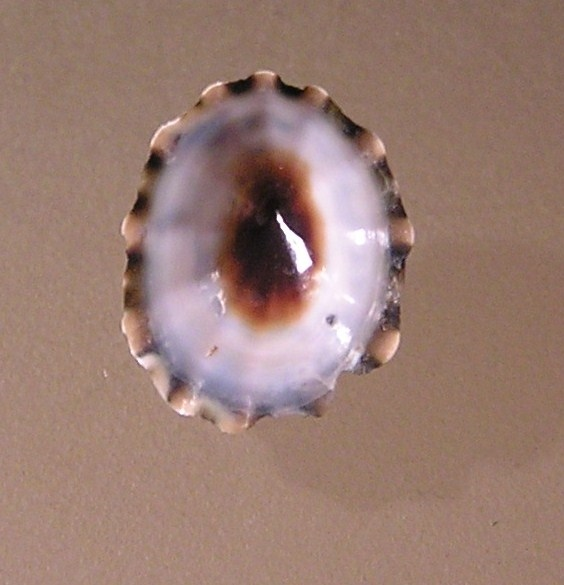
basal view
