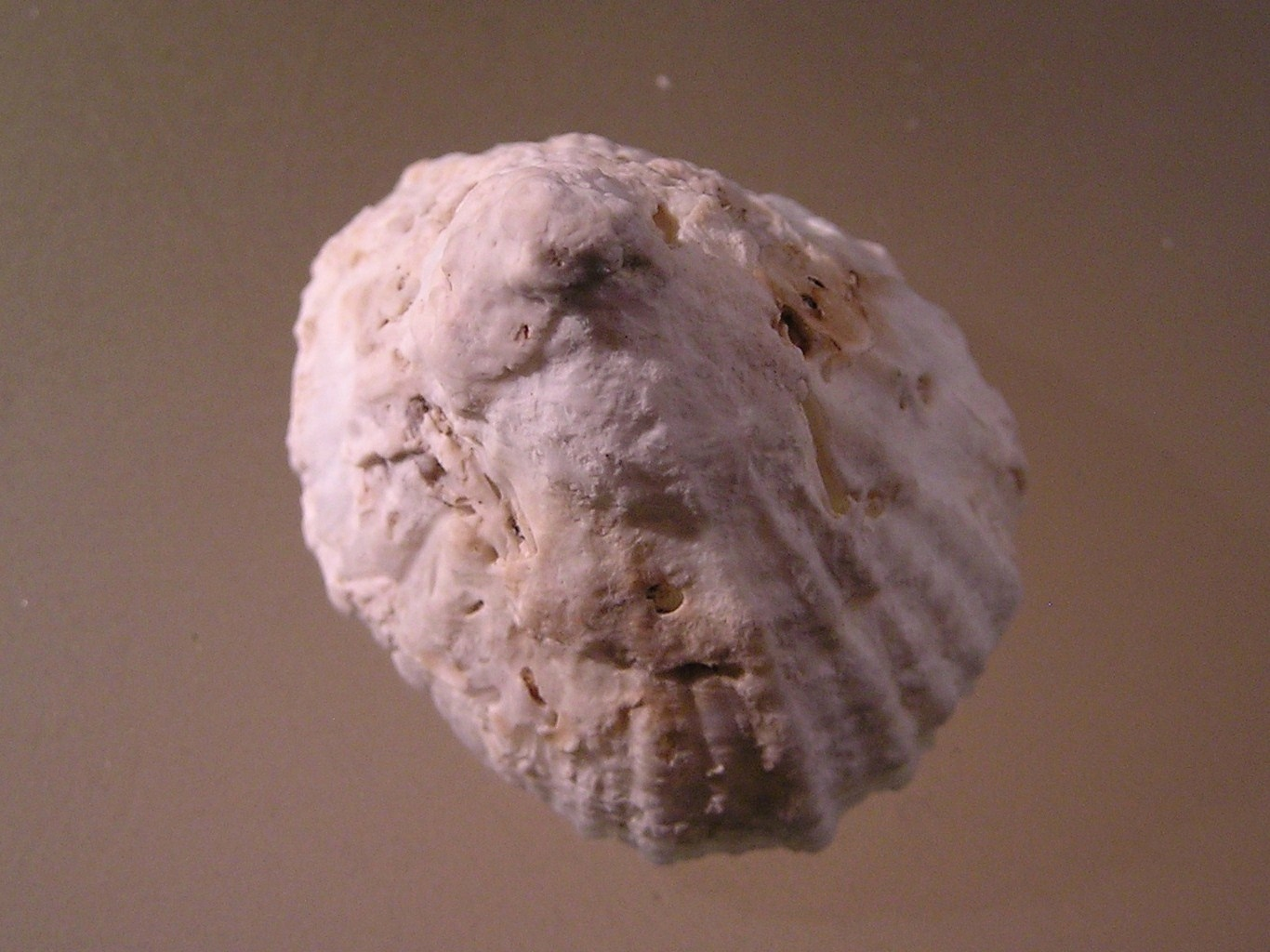
- Niveotectura pallida

Scientific classification
- Kingdom: Animalia
- Phylum: Mollusca
- Class: Gastropoda
- Subclass: Patellogastropoda
- Family: Lottiidae
- Genus: Niveotectura; Habe, 1944

= Niveotectura =

Genus of gastropods

Niveotectura is a genus of sea snails, the true limpets, marine gastropod mollusks in the family Lottiidae.

== Species ==
Species within the genus Niveotectura include:

- Niveotectura funiculata (Carpenter, 1864)
- Niveotectura pallida (Gould, 1859)
