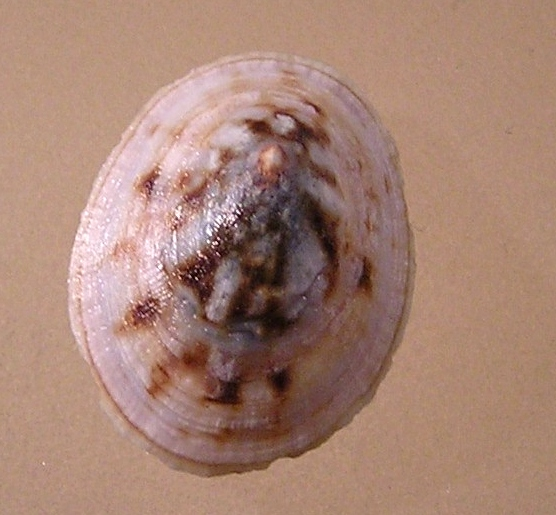
- Testudinalia testudinalis

Scientific classification
- Kingdom: Animalia
- Phylum: Mollusca
- Class: Gastropoda
- Subclass: Patellogastropoda
- Superfamily: Lottioidea
- Family: Lottiidae
- Genus: Testudinalia; Moskalev, 1966

= Testudinalia =

Genus of gastropods

Testudinalia is a genus of sea snails, the true limpets, marine gastropod molluscs in the family Lottiidae.

== Species ==
Species within the genus Testudinalia include:

- Testudinalia tessulata Müller, 1776: synonym of Testudinalia testudinalis (O. F. Müller, 1776)
- Testudinalia testudinalis (Müller, 1776)
