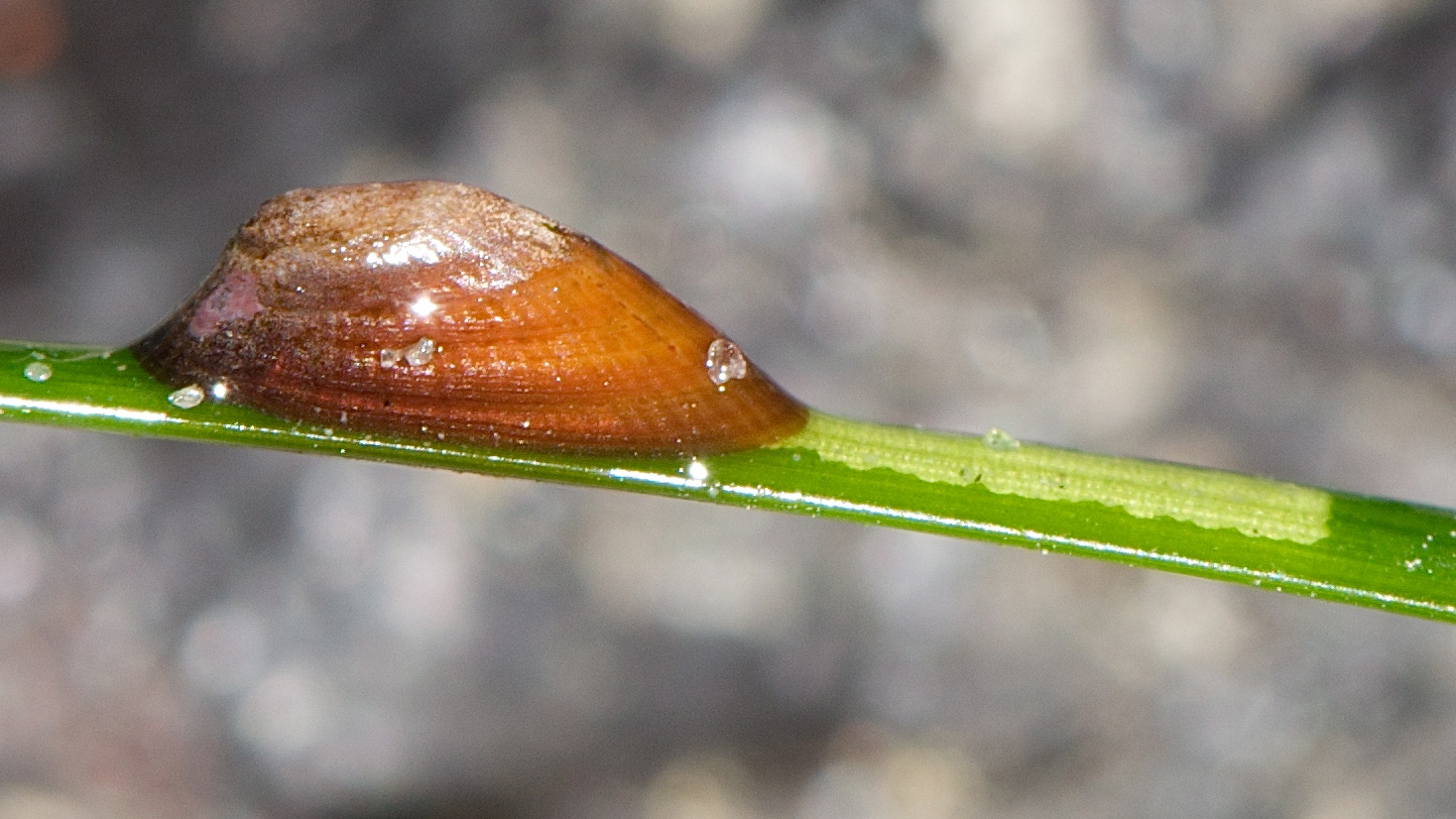
- A live individual of Tectura palacea on a blade of Phyllospadix surfgrass. Anterior end of the limpet to the left
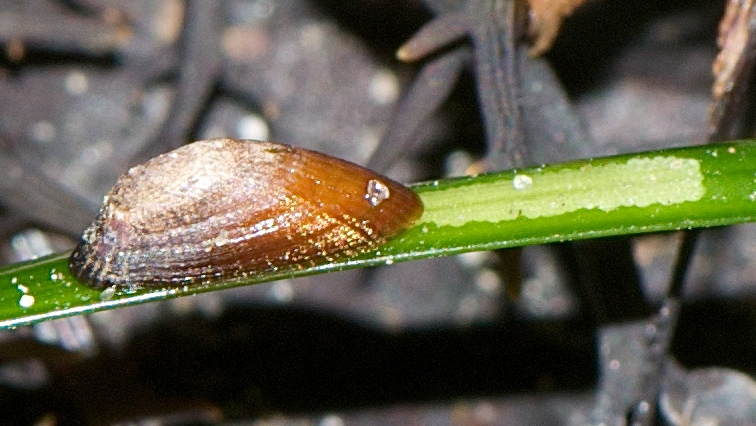

Scientific classification
- Kingdom: Animalia
- Phylum: Mollusca
- Class: Gastropoda
- Subclass: Patellogastropoda
- Family: Lottiidae
- Genus: Tectura
- Species: T. palacea

Binomial name
- Tectura palacea (Gould, 1853)

= Tectura palacea =

Species of gastropod

Tectura palacea, common names the surfgrass limpet or chaffy limpet, also spelled chaffey limpet, is a species of small sea snail, a true limpet, a marine gastropod mollusc in the family Lottiidae.

The shell of this small limpet is about 6–10 mm in length and 2–3 mm in width. The shell dimensions are narrow to correspond with the limpet's habitat: the narrow blades of surfgrasses in the genus Phyllospadix, found at low tide levels. This species occurs in the Eastern Pacific Ocean, on the coast of North America, from Vancouver Island, British Columbia to northern Baja California, Mexico.

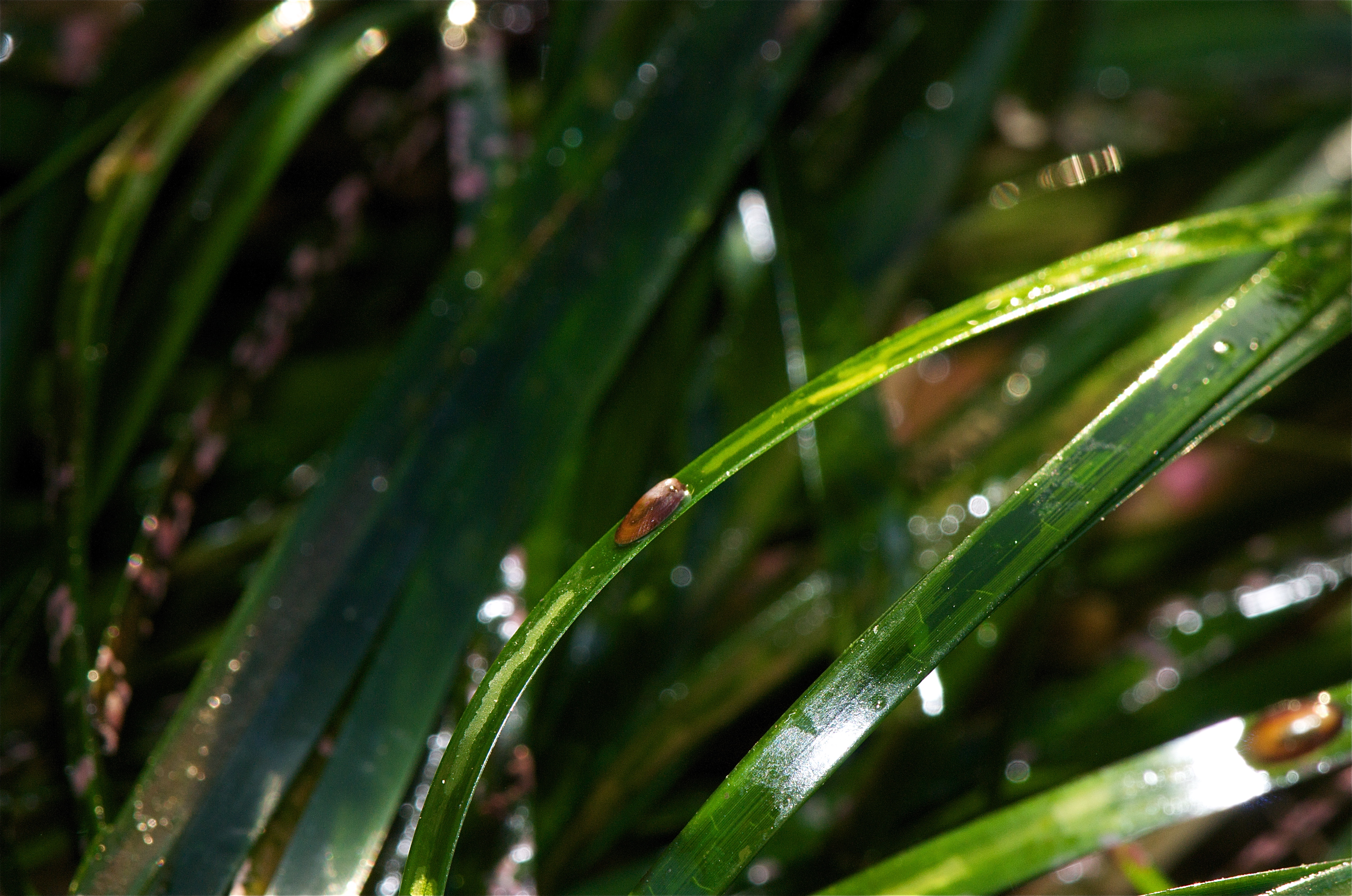
The habitat of Tectura palacea is the blades of surfgrasses in the genus Phyllospadix

== Feeding habits ==
These small limpets graze on the film of microscopic algae that covers the leaf blades of the marine plant Phyllospadix. As can be seen in the accompanying photos, the limpet scrapes off this algal film, leaving a clear trail on the surface of the blade behind it.
