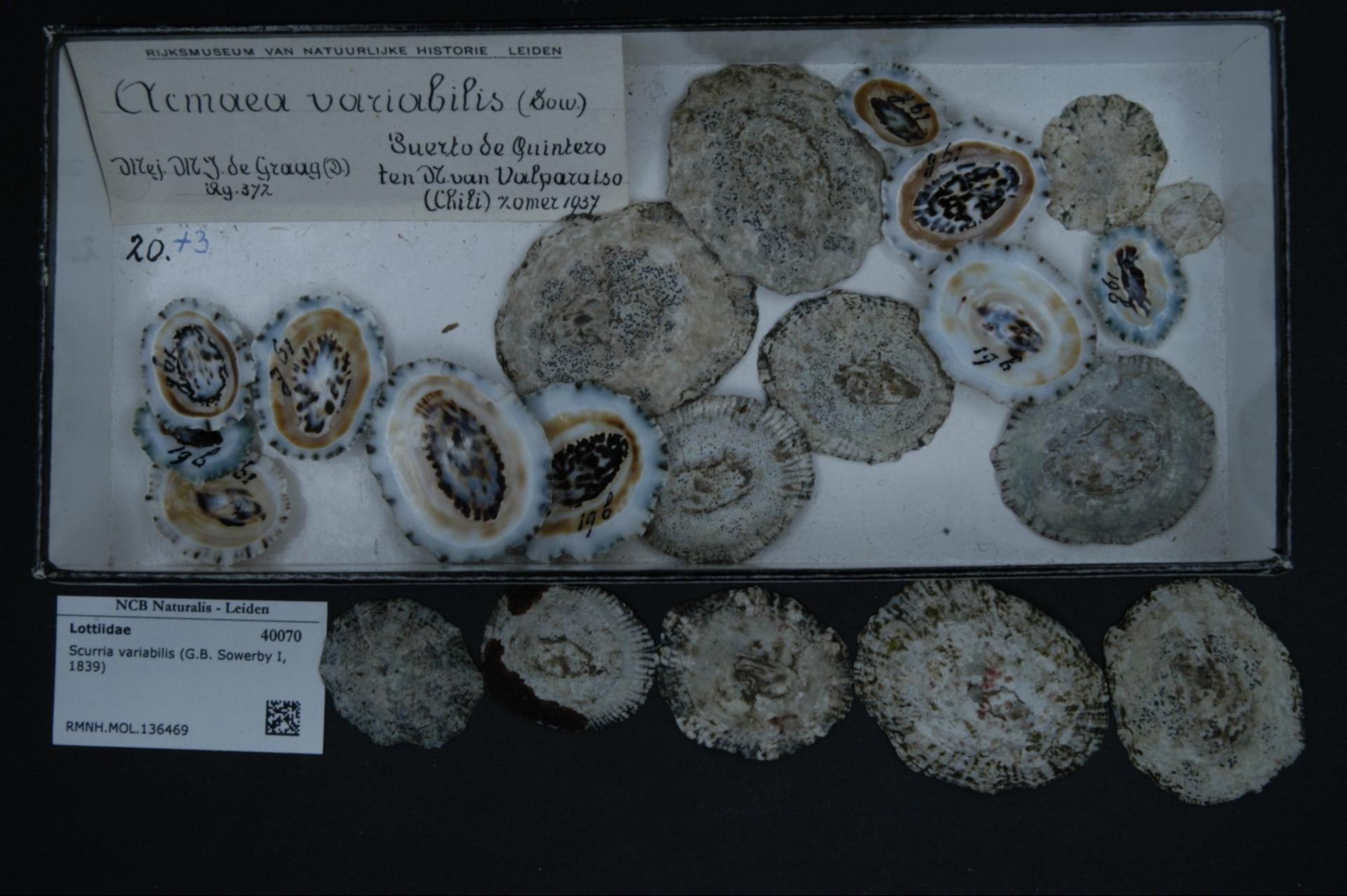
- Scurria variabilis shells

Scientific classification
- Kingdom: Animalia
- Phylum: Mollusca
- Class: Gastropoda
- Subclass: Patellogastropoda
- Family: Lottiidae
- Genus: Scurria
- Species: S. variabilis

Binomial name
- Scurria variabilis (G. B. Sowerby I, 1839)

Synonyms
- Acmaea coffea (Reeve, 1855); Acmaea leucophaea Philippi, 1846; Acmaea nisoria Philippi, 1846 (junior synonym); Acmaea parasitica (d'Orbigny, 1841); Acmaea punctatissima Philippi, 1846(junior synonym); Acmaea variabilis (G. B. Sowerby I, 1839); Collisella huppeana Ramírez-Böhme, 1974; Collisella philippiana Ramírez-Böhme, 1974; Collisella silvana Ramírez-Böhme, 1974; Collisella variabilis Marincovich, 1973; Lottia cymbiola Gould, 1846; Lottia variabilis G. B. Sowerby I, 1839; Patella coffea Reeve, 1855; Patella parasitica d'Orbigny, 1841; Patella penicillata (Reeve, 1855) ·; Patella variabilis (Reeve, 1855); Scurria parasitica (d'Orbigny, 1841)(junior synonym)

= Scurria variabilis =

Species of gastropod

Scurria variabilis is a species of sea snail, a true limpet, a marine gastropod mollusk in the family Lottiidae, one of the families of true limpets.

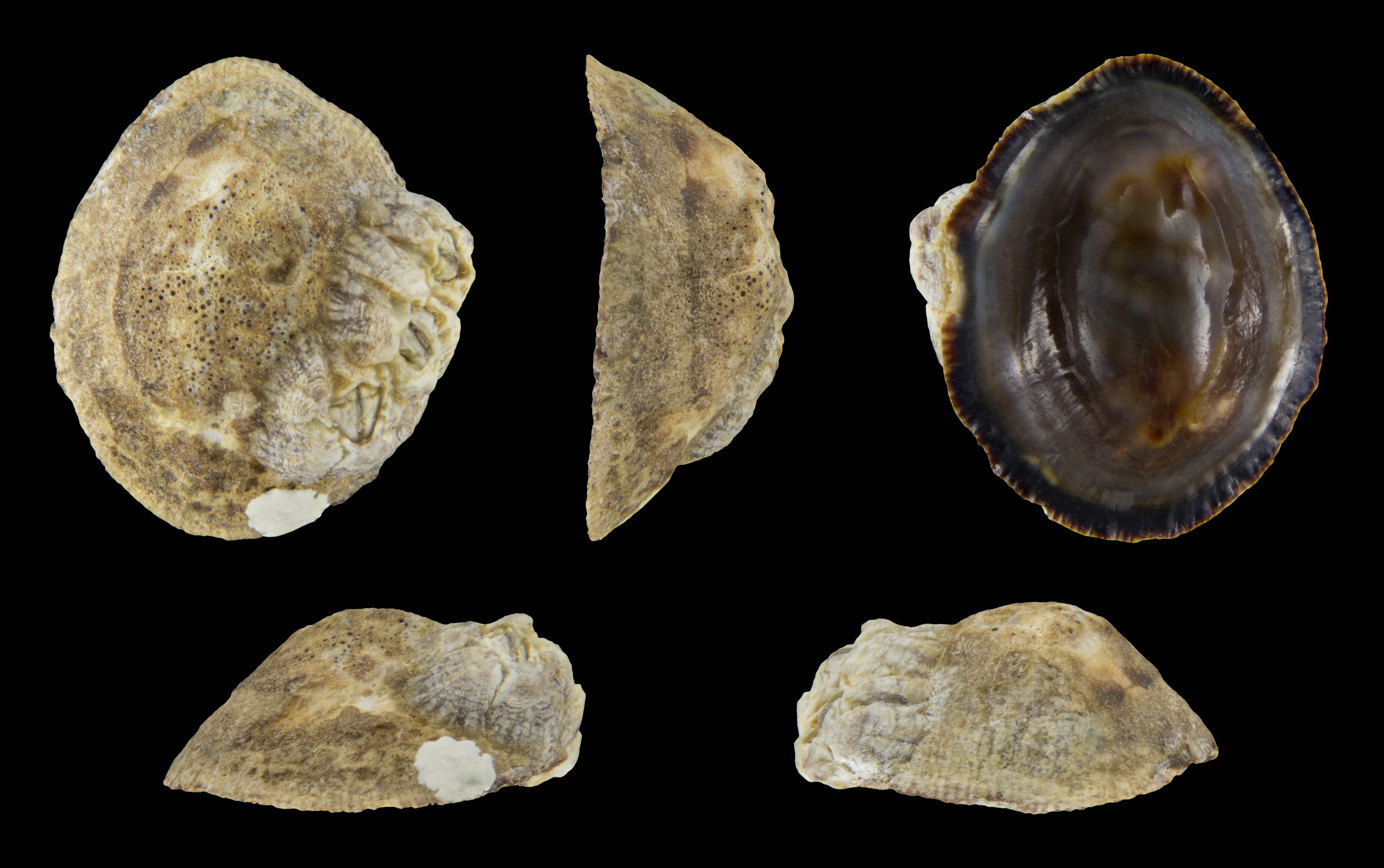
Five views of a shell of Scurria variabilis
