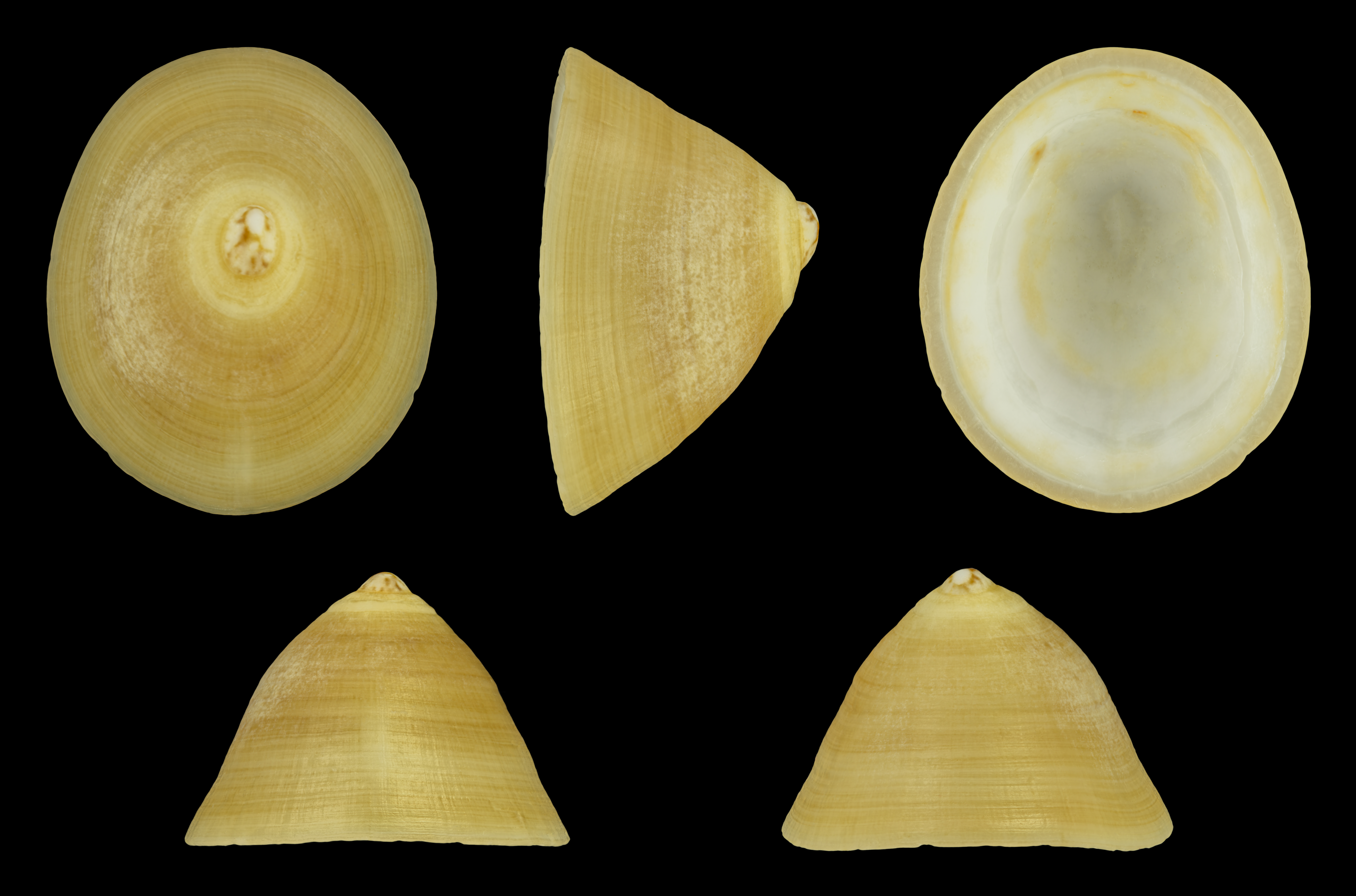
- A shell of Scurria scurra

Scientific classification
- Kingdom: Animalia
- Phylum: Mollusca
- Class: Gastropoda
- Subclass: Patellogastropoda
- Family: Lottiidae
- Genus: Scurria
- Species: S. scurra

Binomial name
- Scurria scurra (Lesson, 1841)

= Scurria scurra =

Species of gastropod

Scurria scurra is a species of sea snail, a true limpet, a marine gastropod mollusk in the family Lottiidae, one of the families of true limpets.

== Description ==
Marine snail similar to a lapa, is a gastropod. Grey shell, white interior.

== Distribution ==
Southeast Pacific and Southwest Atlantic: Chile, Argentina and Falkland Islands.
