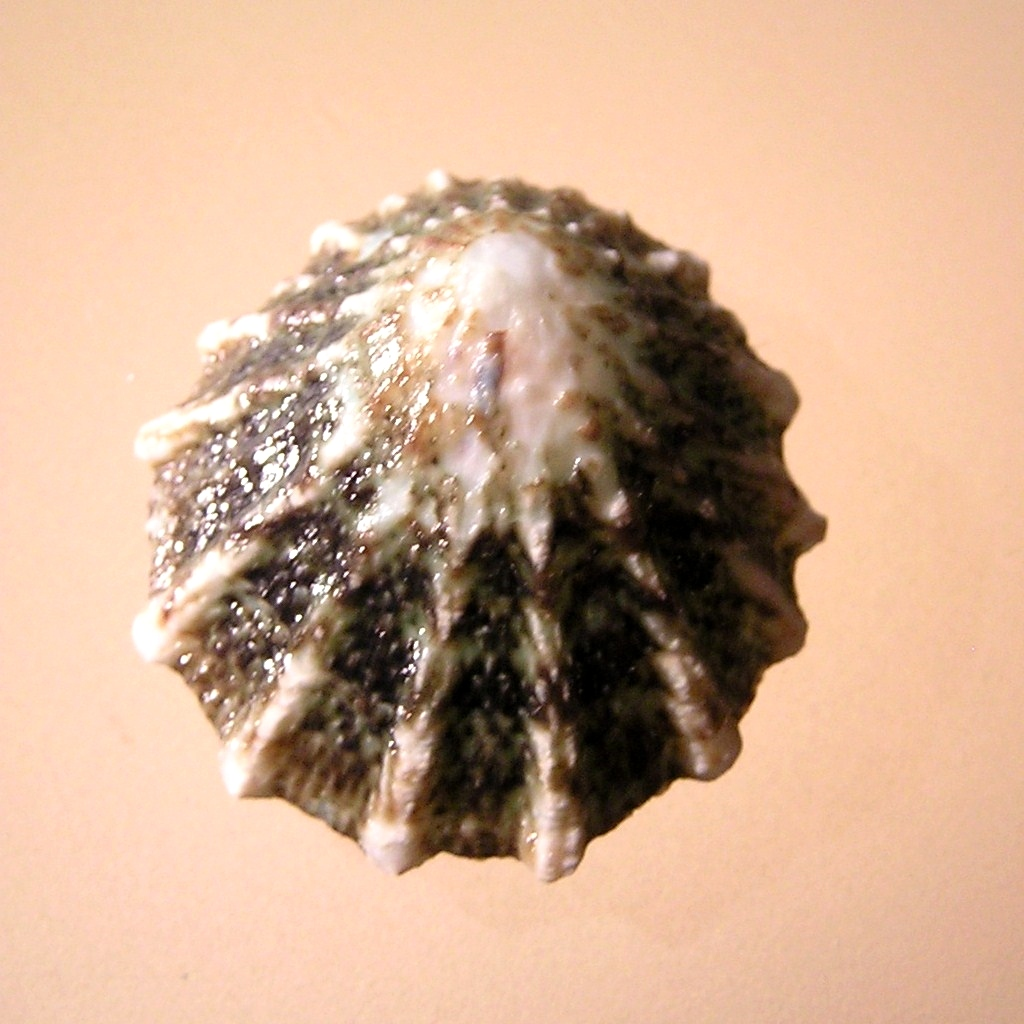
- Scurria ceciliana ceciliana

Scientific classification
- Kingdom: Animalia
- Phylum: Mollusca
- Class: Gastropoda
- Subclass: Patellogastropoda
- Family: Lottiidae
- Genus: Scurria
- Species: S. ceciliana

Binomial name
- Scurria ceciliana (d'Orbigny, 1841)

Synonyms
- Acmaea ceciliana (Pilsbry, 1891); Collisella aconcaguina (Ramírez, 1974); Collisella boehmita (Ramírez, 1974); Collisella ceciliana (Marincovich, 1973); Collisella chaitena (Ramírez, 1974); Collisella chilota (Ramírez, 1974); Collisella dalcahuina (Ramírez, 1974); Collisella ortiguilla (Ramírez, 1974); Collisella piteana (Ramírez, 1974); Collisella silvana (Ramírez, 1974); Patella ceciliana (Orbigny, 1841); Patelloida ceciliana (Powell, 1951)

= Scurria ceciliana =

Species of gastropod

Scurria ceciliana is a species of sea snail, a true limpet, a marine gastropod mollusk in the family Lottiidae, one of the families of true limpets.

== Subspecies ==
- Scurria ceciliana ceciliana (d'Orbigny, 1841)
- Scurria ceciliana magellanica (Strebel, 1907)

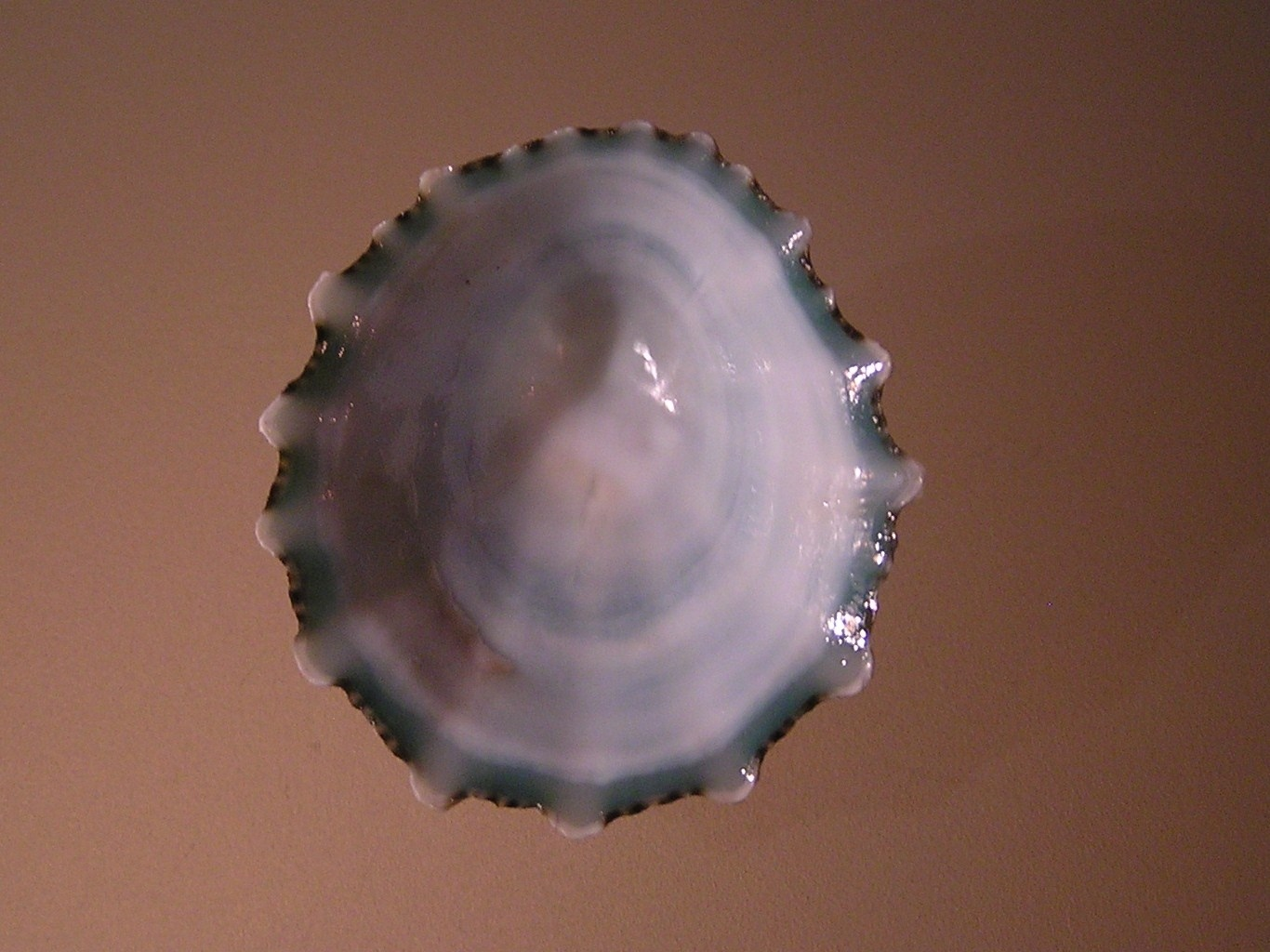
Scurria ceciliana ceciliana, ventral view

OÑO
