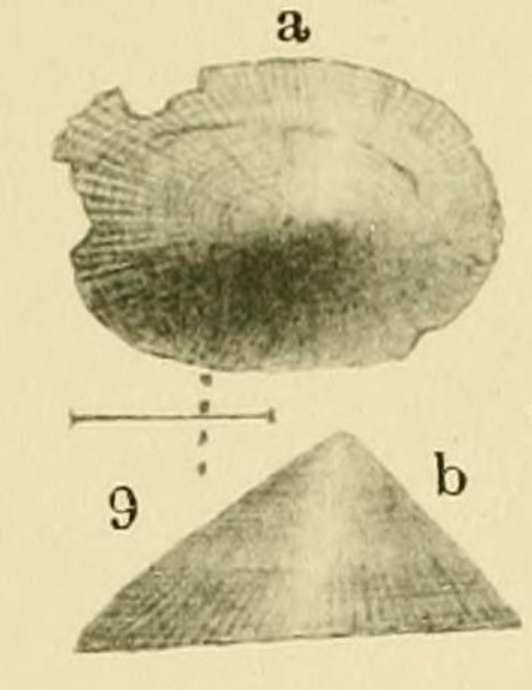

Scientific classification
- Kingdom: Animalia
- Phylum: Mollusca
- Class: Gastropoda
- Subclass: Patellogastropoda
- Family: Lepetidae
- Genus: Lepeta
- Species: L. kuragiensis

Binomial name
- Lepeta kuragiensis (Yokoyama, 1920)

Synonyms
- Acmaea kuragiensis Yokoyama, 1920

= Cryptobranchia kuragiensis =

Species of gastropod

Cryptobranchia kuragiensis is a species of sea snail, a true limpet, a marine gastropod mollusk in the family Lepetidae, one of the families of true limpets.

== Description ==
As a member of the clade Patellogastropoda, Cryptobranchia kuragiensis are mostly gonochoric and broadcast spawners. In terms of their life cycle, embryos develop into planktonic trochophore larvae and later into juvenile veligers before becoming fully grown adults.

== Distribution ==
Cryptobranchia kuragiensis can be found in the Northwest Pacific waters around Japan.
