= Lottia edmitchelli =

Conservation status
- Extinct (IUCN 2.3)

- Presumed Extinct (NatureServe)

Scientific classification
- Kingdom: Animalia
- Phylum: Mollusca
- Class: Gastropoda
- Subclass: Patellogastropoda
- Family: Lottiidae
- Genus: Lottia
- Species: †L. edmitchelli

Binomial name
- †Lottia edmitchelli (Lipps, 1963)

Synonyms
- Acmaea edmitchelli Lipps, 1966; Acmaea mitchelli Lipps, 1963; Collisella edmitchelli (Lipps, 1966)

Species of gastropod

† Lottia edmitchelli was a species of limpet in the family Lottiidae. It was native to the coast of Southern California, where it may have been endemic. Specimens are known from San Nicolas Island, one of the Channel Islands of California, and from San Pedro in the city of Los Angeles.

The specimens from San Nicolas Island lived during the late Pleistocene. The San Pedro specimen was a fresh shell collected between 1861 and 1863. No other fresh specimens have been found since, and the species is thought to be extinct. It is a "neoextinction", one that occurred relatively recently. It may have become extinct because it lived in a specific and fragile habitat that was rapidly degraded and destroyed by human activity as the human population of Southern California grew.
