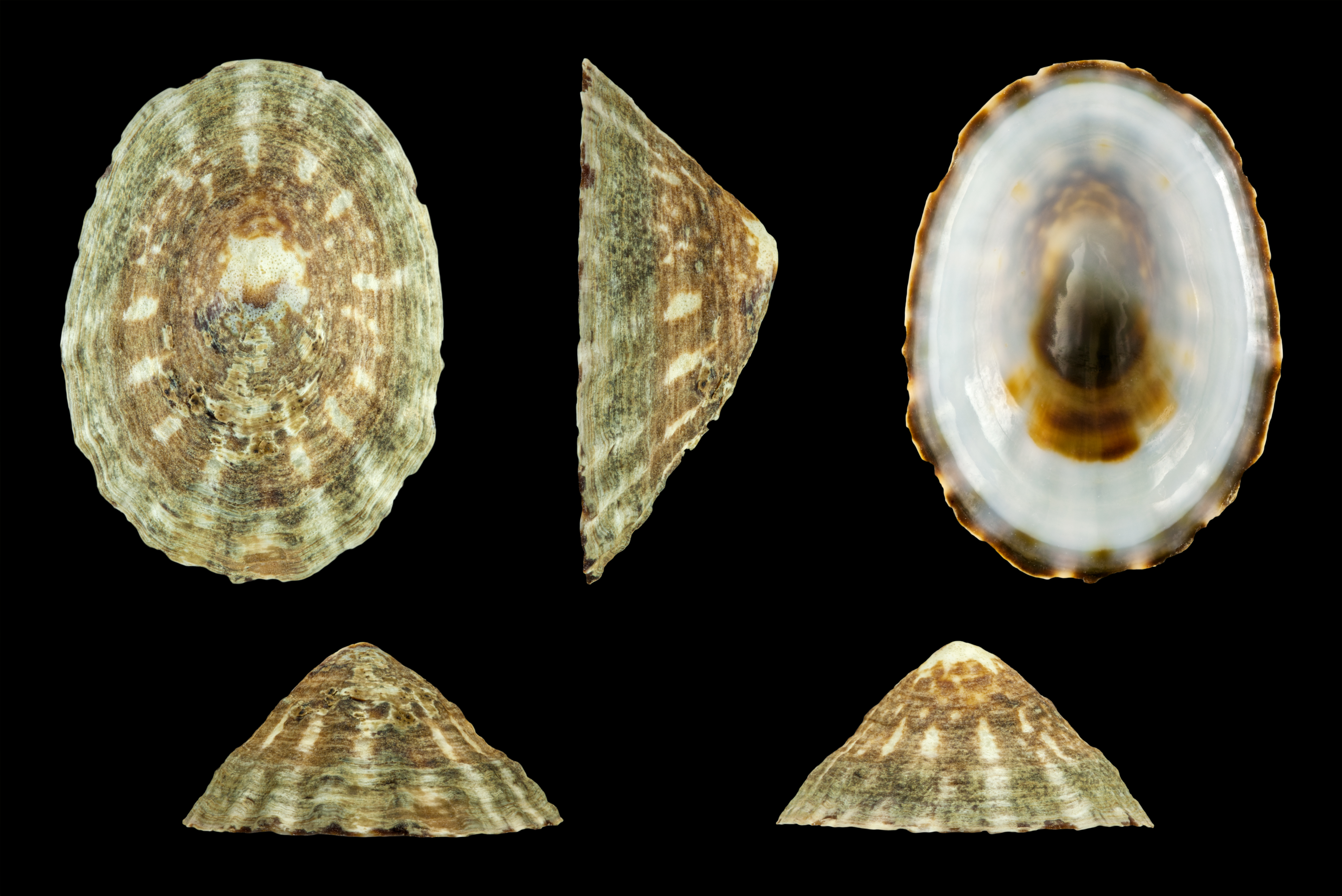

Scientific classification
- Kingdom: Animalia
- Phylum: Mollusca
- Class: Gastropoda
- Subclass: Patellogastropoda
- Family: Lottiidae
- Genus: Lottia
- Species: L. pelta

Binomial name
- Lottia pelta (Rathke, 1833)

Synonyms
- Acmaea (Collisella) pelta (Rathke, 1833) (unaccepted combination); Acmaea cassis pelta Rathke, 1833 (unaccepted rank); Acmaea pelta Rathke, 1833 (original combination); Collisella (Collisella) pelta (Rathke, 1833); Collisella pelta Eschscholtz, 1833; Patella (Acmaea) pelta (Rathke, 1833) (unaccepted combination); Patelloida cassis pelta (Rathke, 1833) (unaccepted combination)

= Lottia pelta =

Species of gastropod

Lottia pelta, common name the shield limpet, is a species of sea snail, a true limpet, a marine gastropod mollusk in the family Lottiidae.

It is still designated under its synonym Collisella pelta (Eschscholtz, 1833) in many textbooks.

== Distribution ==
The shield limpet is found in the intertidal zone on rocks and kelp holdfast from Alaska to Baja California. The largest specimens occur in the northern part of the range.

== Description ==
This shell of this species grows to a width of between 2.5–5.4 cm (0.98–2.13 in) on a broadly elliptical to oval base. It is only moderately elevated. The apex is tilted toward the front end and the sides of the shell are slightly convex. The color of the shell is grayish with irregular, radial stripes. When Lottia pelta moves among substrata the morphology and the color of its shell changes. The ontogenetic record of its past habitats is preserved in the shell structure. The species found on kelp holdfasts have darker shells with obscure ribbing.

The sculpture of the shell is smooth or with irregular, fine radial riblets. Occasionally they become heavy ribs.

The interior of the shell has about the same color as the exterior. There is a dark brown central spot. The base of the interior is marked by alternating dark and light spots.

The species are dominant littoral herbivores, and consume a variety of microscopic and large algae. They are vulnerable to hyposalinity stress, and have a role in resisting warming related changes to intertidal ecosystem composition.

One of its predators is Ocenebra lurida (Middendorff, 1849), a murex snail.

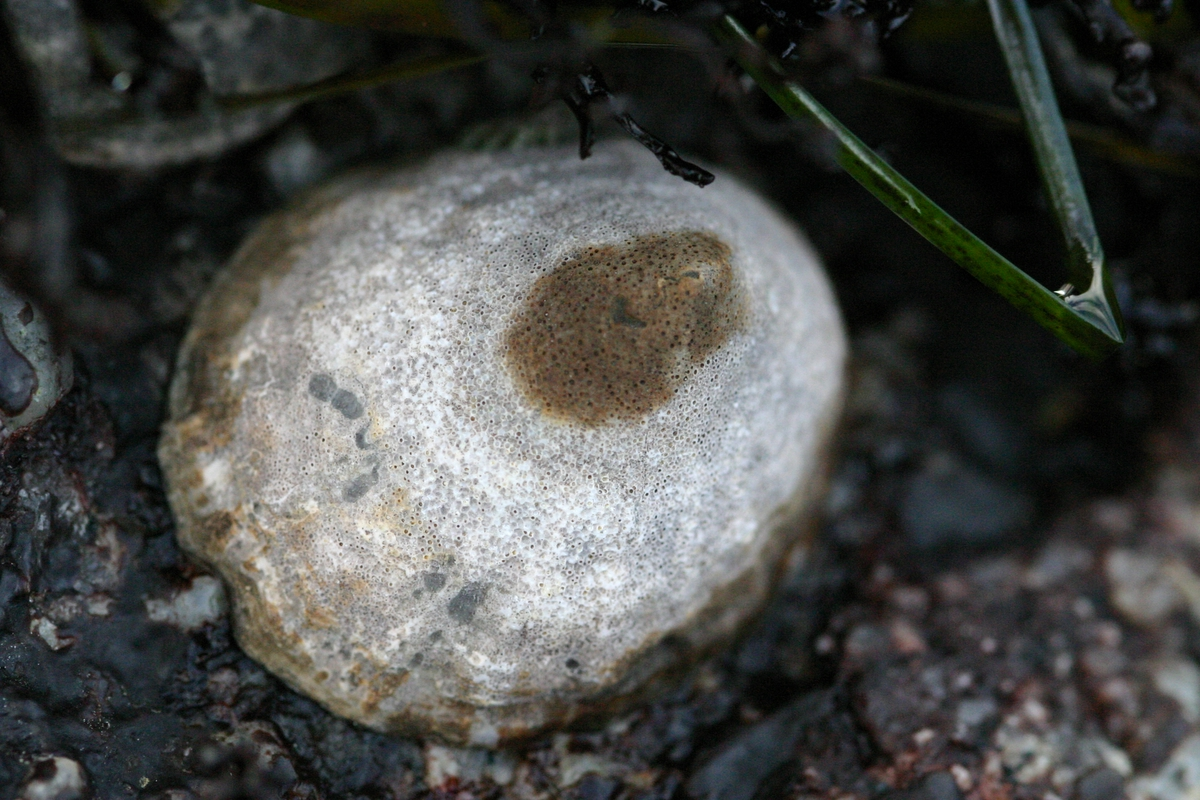

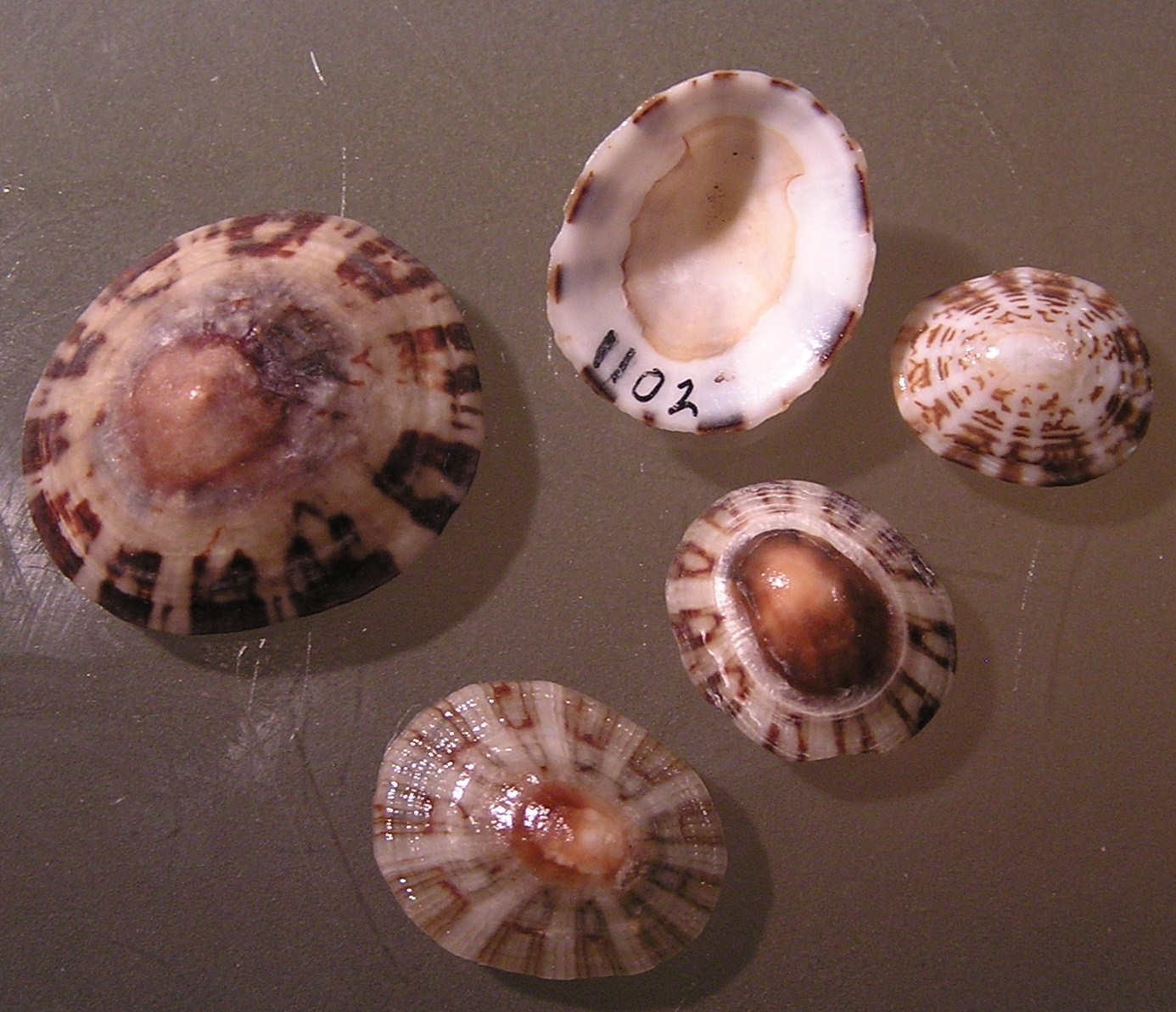

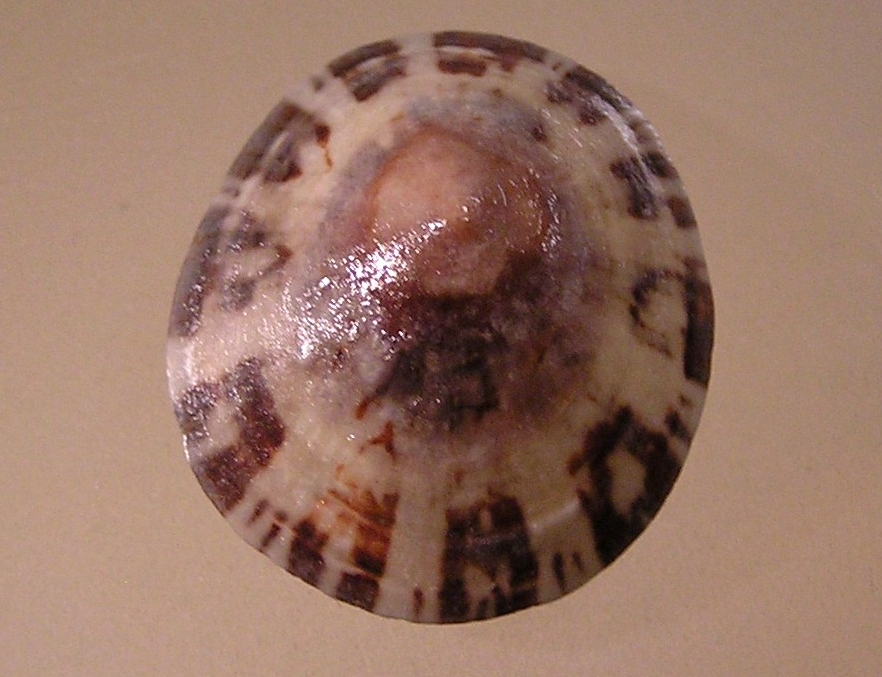
apical view

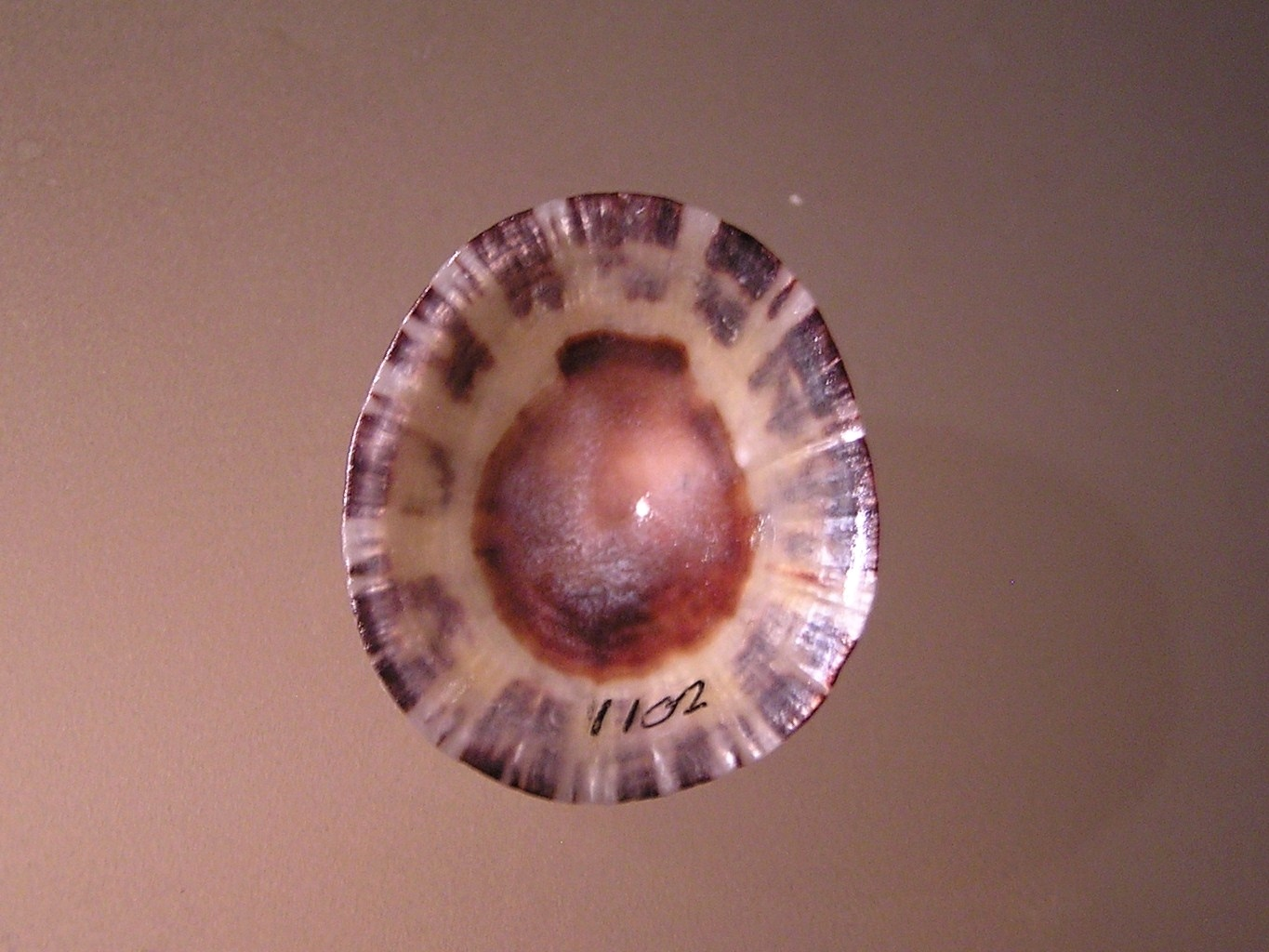
basal viewing

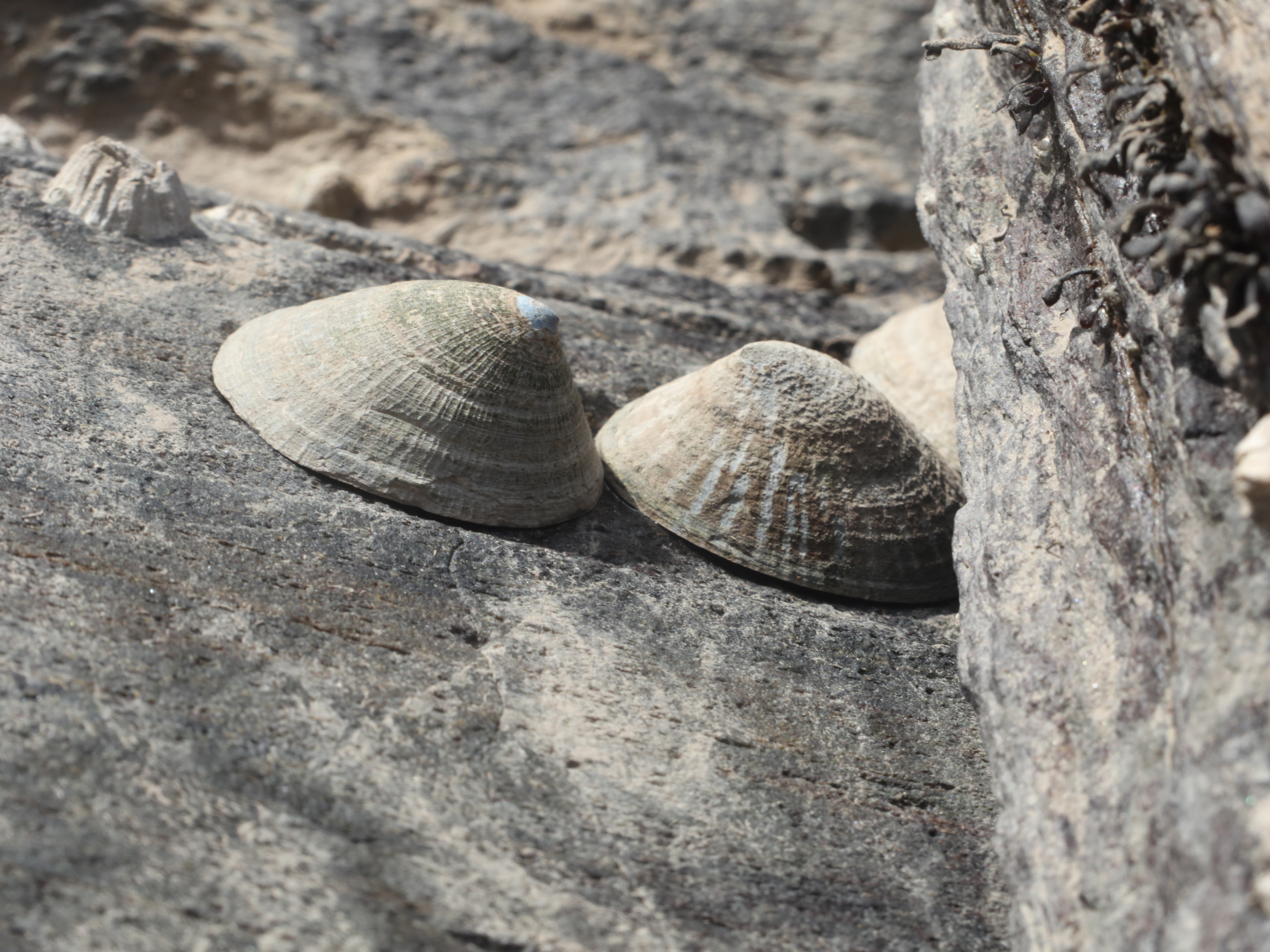
in-situ

== Lifecycle ==
Shield Limpets reproduce by seasonal broadcast spawning, males and females releasing gametes into the water column where external fertilization occurs. The fertilized eggs develop into free-swimming trochophore larvae and then into planktonic veliger larvae, which disperse for days to weeks in coastal waters. When development is complete, the larvae settle onto suitable rocky intertidal substrates and undergo metamorphosis into benthic juveniles. The young limpets begin grazing on microalgae, grow into conical-shelled adults, and typically establish a home scar (a preferred resting site) to which they return after feeding. Adults spawn after reaching sexual maturity, completing the life cycle.
