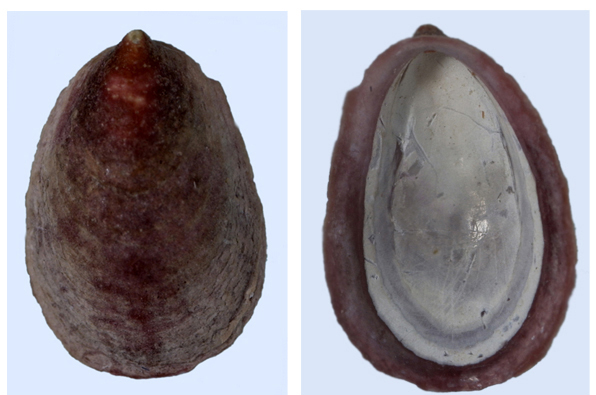

Scientific classification
- Kingdom: Animalia
- Phylum: Mollusca
- Class: Gastropoda
- Subclass: Patellogastropoda
- Family: Acmaeidae
- Genus: Rhodopetala; Dall, 1921
- Species: R. rosea

Binomial name
- Rhodopetala rosea (Dall, 1872)

Synonyms
- Acmaea rosea Dall, 1872 (basionym)

= Rhodopetala =

Rhodopetala rosea

Species of gastropod

Rhodopetala rosea, common name the pink limpet, is a species of sea snail or true limpet, a marine gastropod mollusc in the family Acmaeidae, one of the families of true limpets. It represents the only member of the genus Rhodopetala and of its subfamily, Rhodopetaleinae. It is native to the Kuril, Aleutian, and Kodiac Islands. Its diet consists of coralline and laminarian algae. They extend from the Triassic period to the recent.

== Taxonomy ==
Taxonomic characteristics of this species have been debated. In 1981, following the first examination of the soft body parts of a specimen (previous classifications had relied solely on shell characteristics), Lindberg proposed the creation of a new subfamily within the Acmaeidae to be called "Rhodopetaleinae" with this species as its only member. It is distinguished from the other subfamilies of this family by its helcioniform rather than conical shell, a silvery metallic luster in its central area rather than a porcelaneous quality, and the presence of a rudimentary gill lacking ctenidial structures. It is the combination of the shell structure (patellid) and anatomy (acmaeid) which suggest this is an intermediary group between the acmaeid and cellanid limpets.
