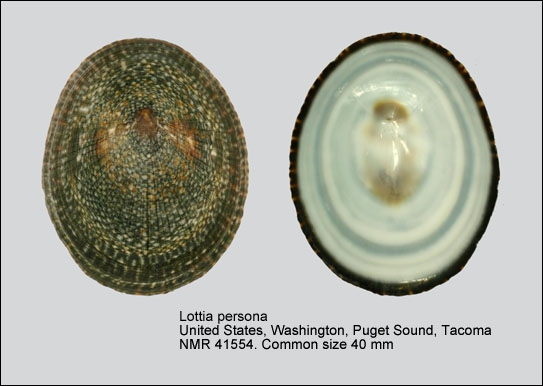

Scientific classification
- Kingdom: Animalia
- Phylum: Mollusca
- Class: Gastropoda
- Subclass: Patellogastropoda
- Family: Lottiidae
- Subfamily: Lottiinae
- Tribe: Lottiini
- Genus: Lottia
- Species: L. persona

Binomial name
- Lottia persona (Rathke, 1833)

Synonyms
- Acmaea (Collisella) persona Rathke, 1833 (a junior synonym); Acmaea (Collisella) radiata Rathke, 1833 (a junior synonym); Acmaea persona Rathke, 1833 (original combination); Acmaea radiata Rathke, 1833; Collisella borealis Lindberg, 1982; † Collisella radiata (Rathke, 1833) (a junior synonym); Lottia borealis (Lindberg, 1982); Patella (Acmaea) persona (Rathke, 1833) (unaccepted combination); Patella textilis A. Gould, 1846 (junior subjective synonym); Tectura persona (Rathke, 1833) ·

= Lottia persona =

Species of gastropod

Lottia persona is a species of sea snail, a true limpet, a marine gastropod mollusk in the family Lottiidae, one of the families of true limpets.

== Description ==
L. persona is a large, moderately tall limpet growing to up to fifty millimetres long. The apex is not central, being about one third of the way along the shell which is dark olive-green with fine white markings and has fine radial ribs, though these have often been smoothed down by erosion. The anterior slope is straight or slightly concave.

== Distribution ==
L. persona is found on the North American Pacific coast from Alaska to central California. It is a cryptic species, common to the high and mid-intertidal zones in sheltered rocky coasts. It is mostly found in crevices and caves and under overhangs. It is nocturnal, grazing on micro-algae when the rocks are wet.
