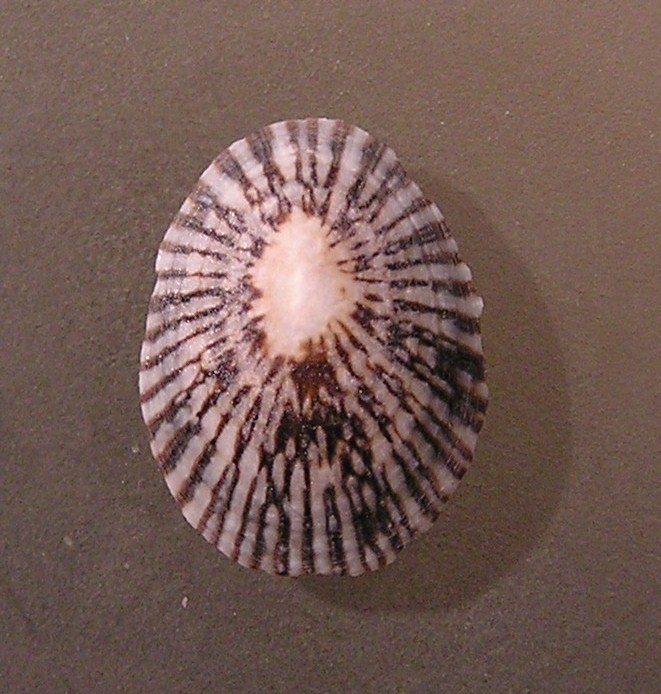

Scientific classification
- Kingdom: Animalia
- Phylum: Mollusca
- Class: Gastropoda
- Subclass: Patellogastropoda
- Family: Lottiidae
- Genus: Lottia
- Species: L. antillarum

Binomial name
- Lottia antillarum G.B. Sowerby I, 1834

Synonyms
- Acmaea antillarum (G. B. Sowerby I, 1834); Acmaea elegans Philippi, 1846; Acmaea wottonae Christiaens, 1975; Patella candeana d'Orbigny, 1847; Patella opea Reeve, 1855; Patella pulcherrima Krebs, 1864; Tectura antillarum (G. B. Sowerby I, 1834)

= Lottia antillarum =

Species of gastropod

Lottia antillarum is a species of limpet or sea snail in the family Lottiidae. It is commonly known as the Antilles limpet.

== Distribution ==
This marine species occurs in the Gulf of Mexico, in the Caribbean Sea, and off the Lesser Antilles.

== Description ==
- Size: They typically range from 10 to 28 mm in length.
- Geographic Range: This species is found in the Western Atlantic, including the Florida Keys, the West Indies, and northern South America.
- Habitat: They are commonly found in the littoral zones of the Caribbean, including Aruba, Bonaire, Curaçao, and Jamaica.

== Biology ==
Like other members of the order Patellogastropoda, Lottia antillarum is typically a broadcast spawner. Its life cycle progresses from embryos to planktonic trochophore larvae, then to juvenile veligers, and finally to adults.

The species was first described by George Brettingham Sowerby I in 1834. Its conservation status has not yet been assessed by the IUCN Red List.
