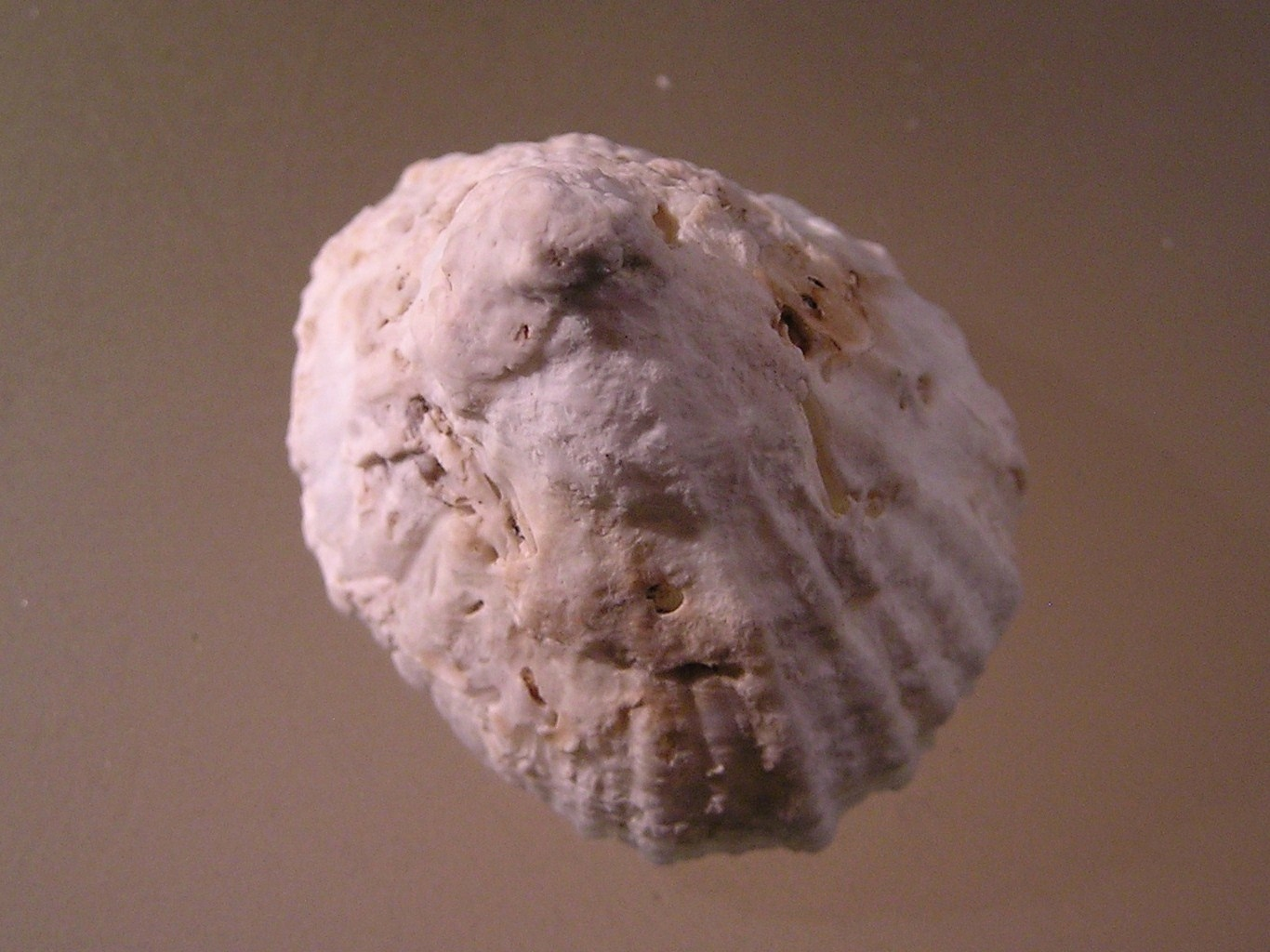

Scientific classification
- Kingdom: Animalia
- Phylum: Mollusca
- Class: Gastropoda
- Subclass: Patellogastropoda
- Family: Lottiidae
- Genus: Niveotectura
- Species: N. pallida

Binomial name
- Niveotectura pallida (Gould, 1859)

Synonyms
- Acmaea (Niveotectura) pallida (A. Gould, 1859) (unaccepted combination); Patella lamanonii Schrenck, 1861 (a junior synonym); Patella pallida A. Gould, 1859 (superseded combination)

= Niveotectura pallida =

Species of gastropod

Niveotectura pallida is a species of sea snail, a true limpet, a marine gastropod mollusk in the family Lottiidae, one of the families of true limpets.

== Description ==
The shell can grow to be 32 mm to 60 mm.

== Distribution ==
Niveotectura pallida can be found off of north Japan, North Korea, and Sakhalin, Russia

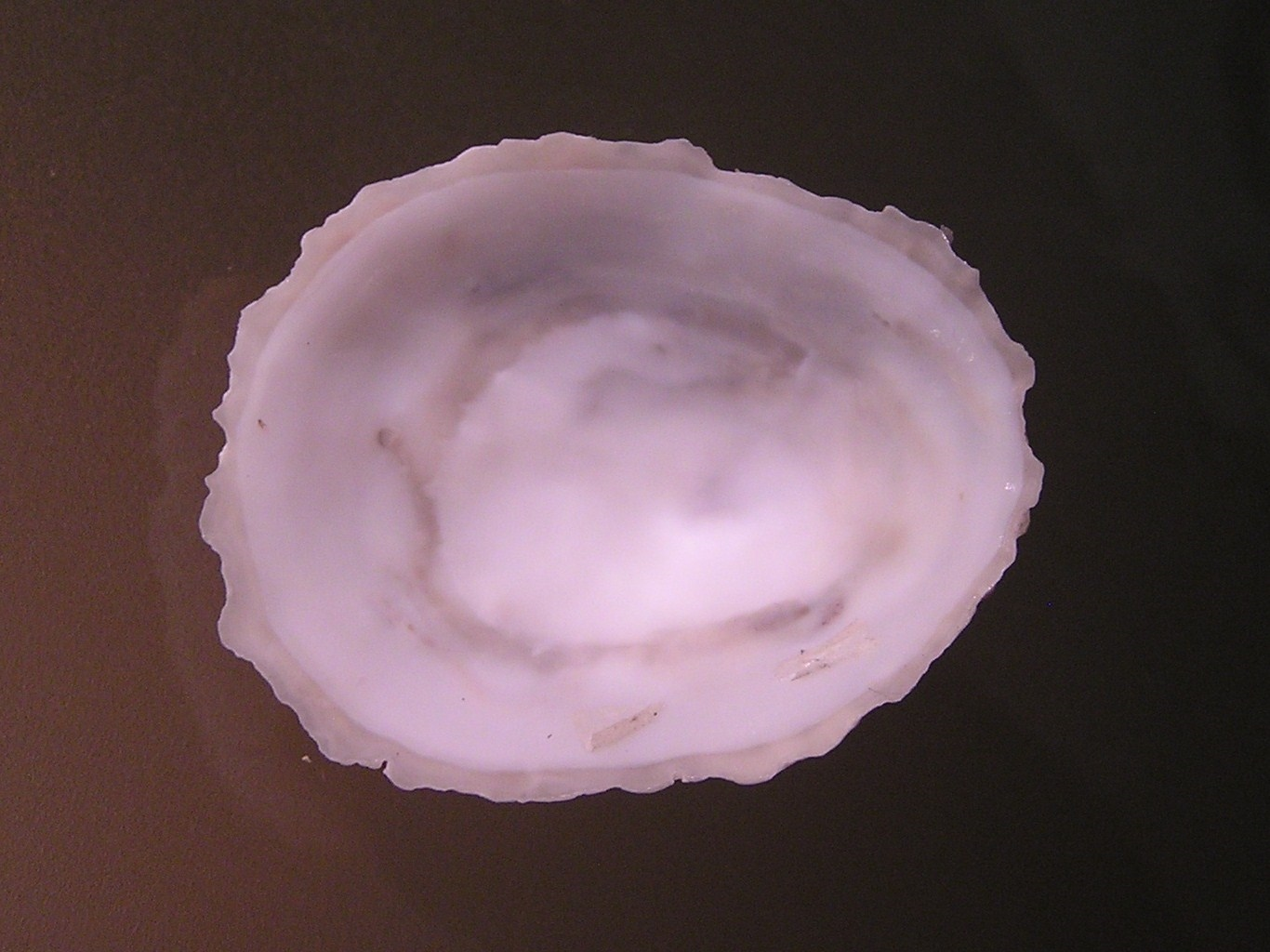
basal view
