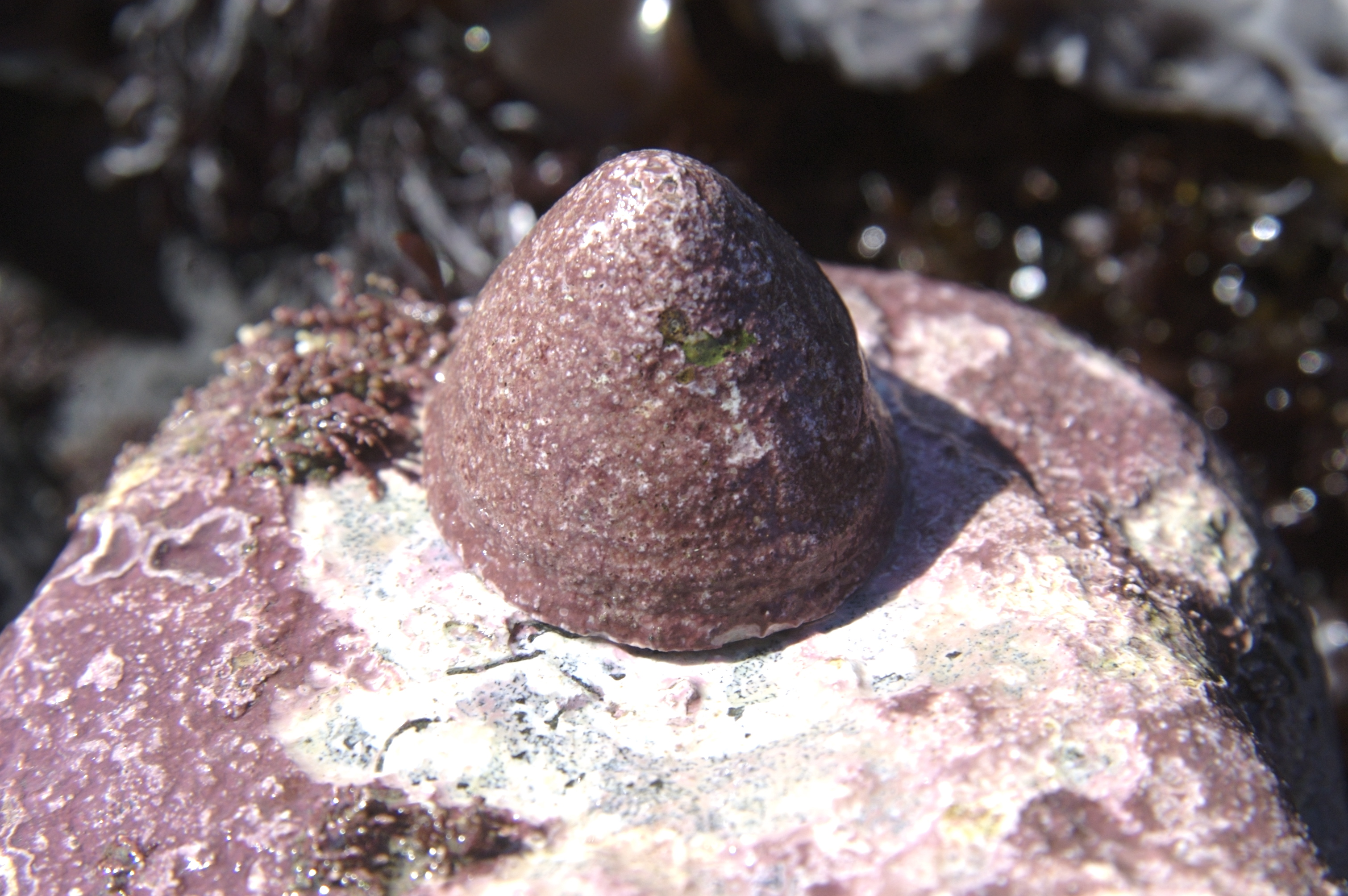
- Shell of Acmaea mitra

Scientific classification
- Kingdom: Animalia
- Phylum: Mollusca
- Class: Gastropoda
- Subclass: Patellogastropoda
- Superfamily: Lottioidea
- Family: Acmaeidae; Forbes, 1850

Type genus
- Acmaea Eschscholtz, 1833

= Acmaeidae =

Family of gastropods

Acmaeidae is a family of sea snails, specifically true limpets, marine gastropod mollusks in the superfamily Lottioidea and the subclass Patellogastropoda (according to the taxonomy of the Gastropoda by Bouchet & Rocroi, 2005).

== Taxonomy ==
Listed as valid family in Bouchet & Rocroi (2005) but this classification revised following the molecular phylogeny of Nakano & Ozawa (2007). Acmaeinae, including Erginus, was found to be paraphyletic. However, this synonymy was subsequently found incorrect, having been the result of contaminated samples, and Acmaea mitra and a related species, Niveotectura pallida form a well-supported clade outside of the Lottiidae, and Acmaeidae was re-established.

== Genera ==
- Acmaea Eschscholtz, 1833
- † Marbodaeia Chelot, 1886
- † Pseudorhytidopilus Cox, 1960
- Rhodopetala Dall, 1921

Synonyms

- † Guerangeria Cossmann, 1885 : synonym of † Marbodaeia Chelot, 1886 (preoccupied by Guerangeria Oehlert, 1881 [Bivalvia]; Marbodaeia Chelot, 1886 is a replacement name)
- † Marbodeia [sic] : synonym of † Marbodaeia Chelot, 1886 (misspelling in Haber (1932) and others)
