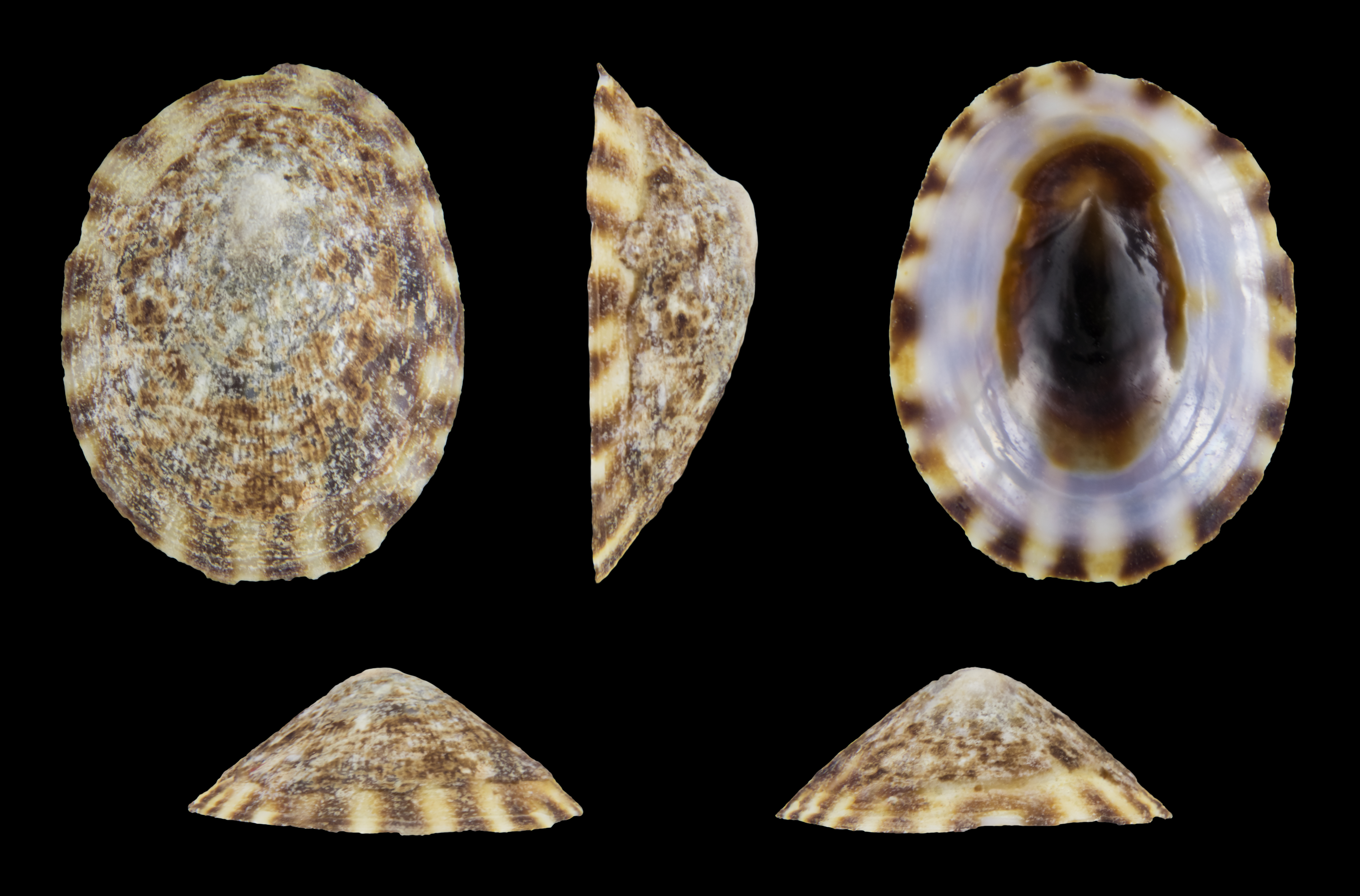
- Testudinalia testudinalis

Scientific classification
- Kingdom: Animalia
- Phylum: Mollusca
- Class: Gastropoda
- Subclass: Patellogastropoda
- Family: Lottiidae
- Genus: Testudinalia
- Species: T. testudinalis

Binomial name
- Testudinalia testudinalis (Müller, 1776)

Synonyms
- Acmaea testudinalis Müller, 1776; Collisella tessulata (O. F. Müller, 1776); Lottia testudinalis Müller, 1776); Notoacmea testudinalis (O. F. Müller, 1776); Tectura testudinalis Müller, 1776); Testudinalia tessulata Müller, 1776)

= Testudinalia testudinalis =

Species of gastropod

Testudinalia testudinalis, common name the common tortoise limpet, is a species of sea snail, a true limpet, a marine gastropod mollusk in the family Lottiidae, one of the families of true limpets. It is commonly known as the plant limpet or tortoiseshell limpet.

== Description ==
T. testudinalis has a low domed shell, oval in outline. It can grow to up to 30 x 24 x 10 mm but typically is about half this size. The apex is towards the anterior of the shell and fine ridges radiate from it. The shell is banded with brown and white. The mantle is the part of the body wall immediately under the shell and at the edges it is curled round to form a collar. The foot is broad and oval. The head bears two sensory tentacles with a tiny black eye at the base of each.

== Distribution and habitat ==
T. testudinalis occurs in northern regions of both the Pacific and Northwest Atlantic Oceans and in European waters. It is found in the neritic zone from low water mark down to a depth of about fifty metres. It is usually found on stones and boulders, especially those encrusted with red crustose algae such as Lithothamnion.

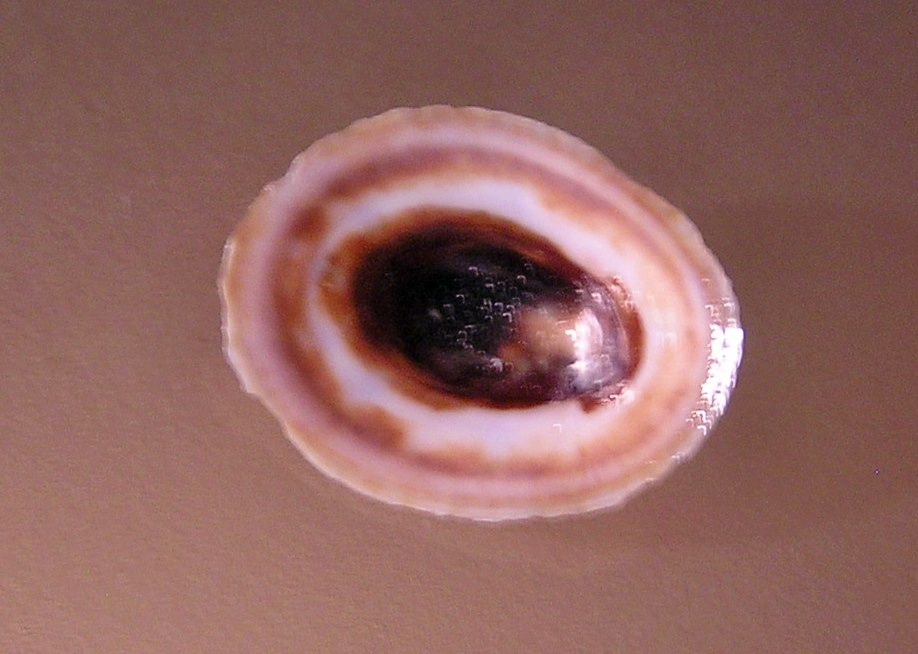
Basal view

== Biology ==
Red eggs are laid in a sheet in the spring and the larvae are planktonic.
