= P. reticulatum =

P. reticulatum may refer to:

- Pentabrachion reticulatum, a flowering plant species
- Phragmipedium reticulatum, an orchid species
- Propilidium reticulatum, a sea snail species
- Pseuderanthemum reticulatum, a synonym of Pseuderanthemum maculatum, a shrub species
- Pseudoplatystoma reticulatum, a catfish species
- Pterospermum reticulatum, a flowering plant species
