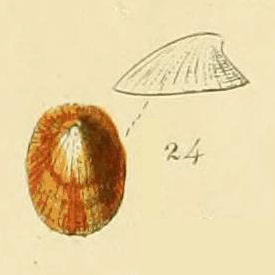
- Iothia fulva shell

Scientific classification
- Kingdom: Animalia
- Phylum: Mollusca
- Class: Gastropoda
- Subclass: Patellogastropoda
- Superfamily: Lottioidea
- Family: Lepetidae
- Genus: Iothia; Forbes, 1849

= Iothia =

Genus of gastropods

Iothia is a genus of sea snails, the true limpets, marine gastropod mollusks in the family Lepetidae.

== Species ==
The following species within the genus Iothia are recognised by the World Register of Marine Species :

- Iothia albescens (Philippi, 1846) (nomen dubium)
- Iothia emarginuloides (Philippi, 1868)
- Iothia fulva (O. F. Müller, 1776)
- Iothia lindbergi McLean, 1985
- Iothia megalodon Warén, Nakano & Sellanes, 2011

Species brought into synonymy

- Iothia antarctica (E. A. Smith, 1907): synonym of Iothia emarginuloides (Philippi, 1868)
- Iothia coppingeri (E. A. Smith, 1881): synonym of Iothia emarginuloides (Philippi, 1868)
- Iothia depressa (Hedley, 1916): synonym of Nacella polaris (Hombron & Jacquinot, 1841): synonym of Nacella concinna (Strebel, 1908)
- Iothia fulviformis (Egorova, 1972): synonym of Iothia emarginuloides (Philippi, 1868)
- Iothia pelseneeri (Thiele, 1912): synonym of Propilidium pelseneeri Thiele, 1912
- Iothia radiata (M. Sars, 1851): synonym of Piliscus commodus (Middendorff, 1851)
