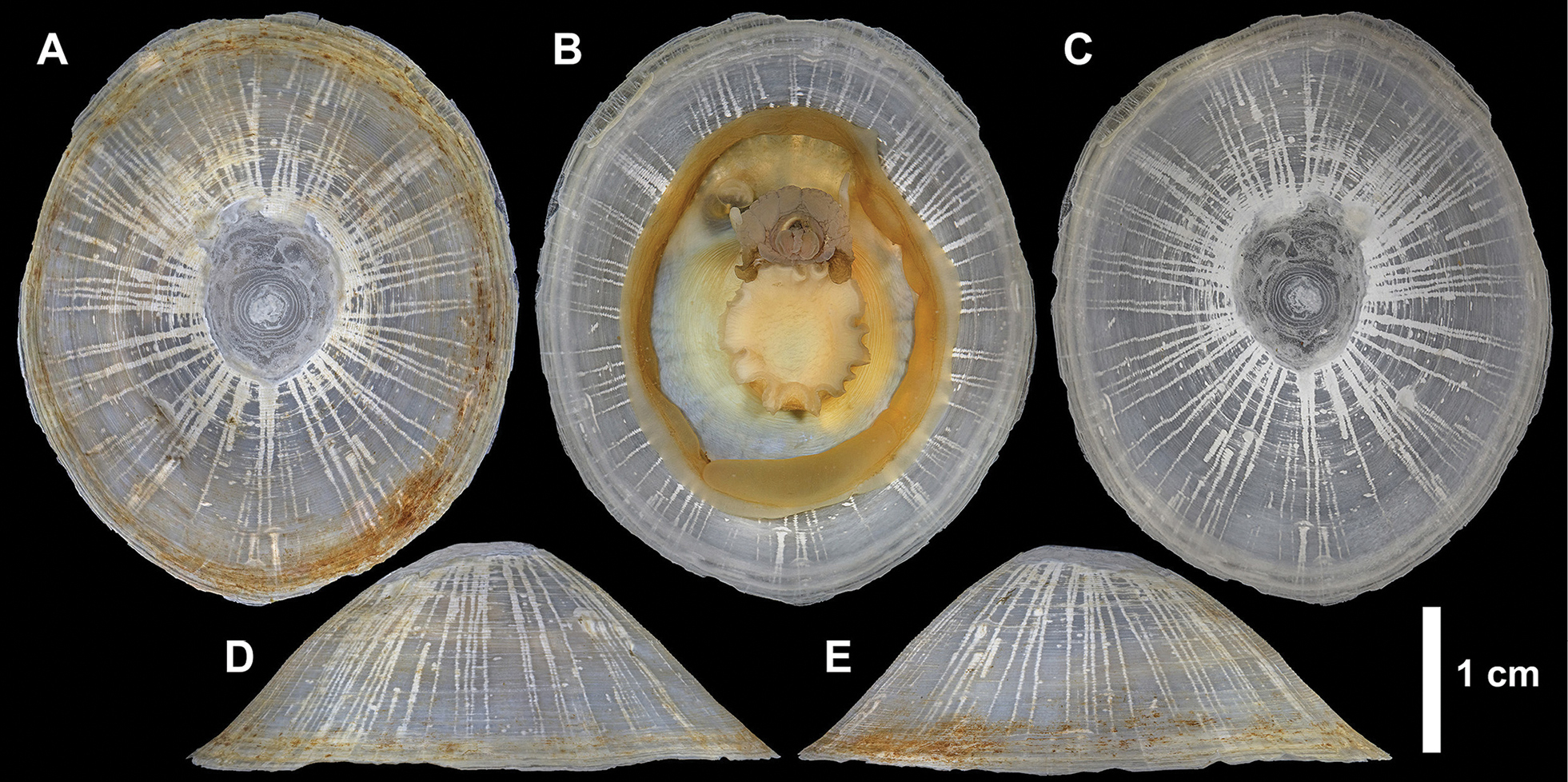

Scientific classification
- Kingdom: Animalia
- Phylum: Mollusca
- Class: Gastropoda
- Subclass: Patellogastropoda
- Family: Lepetidae
- Genus: Bathylepeta
- Species: B. wadatsumi

Binomial name
- Bathylepeta wadatsumi C. Chen, M. Tsuda & Ishitani, 2025

= Bathylepeta wadatsumi =

Species of limpet

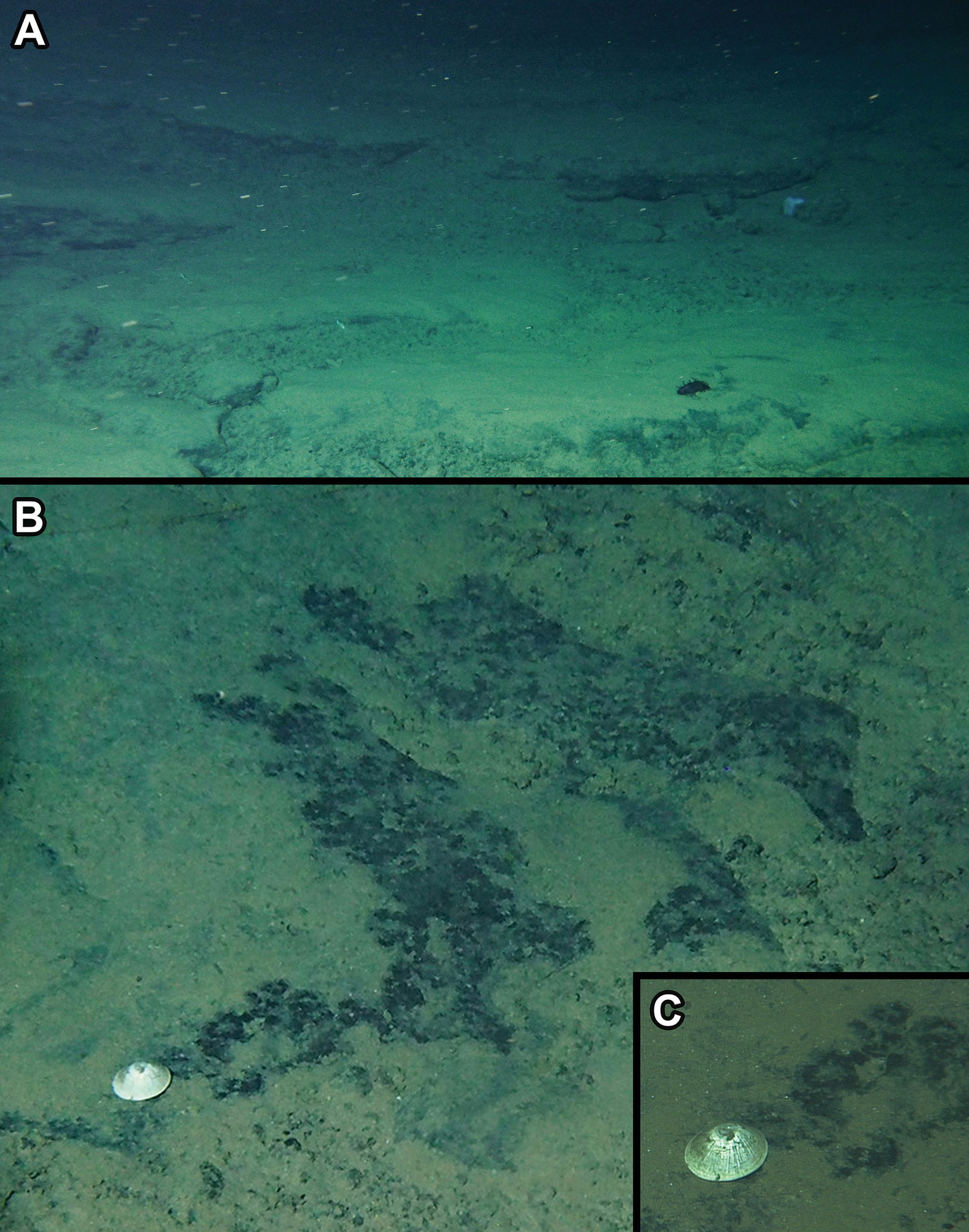
The species in situ.

Bathylepeta wadatsumi is a species of large, deep-sea true limpet, belonging to the family Lepetidae.

== Etymology ==
The name is derived from the Japanese sea god Watatsumi, alluding to its very deep habitat. It is also a reference to the fish-man character "Large Monk" Wadatsumi from the manga series One Piece, "whose enormous body size is reminiscent of the large size that B. wadatsumi sp. nov. reaches for a deep-water patellogastropod.".

== Distribution ==
It was discovered in the northwestern Pacific in 2025.

== Description ==
The limpets can grow up to 4 cm across and were found living 5922 m below sea level, making them the deepest-recorded true limpets as of 2025. Phylogenetic analysis showed the species to be most closely related to Bathylepeta linseae of Antarctica. The species' discovery was published in Zoosystematics and Evolution, an open-access journal; the three authors of the paper worked at the Japan Agency for Marine-Earth Science and Technology.
