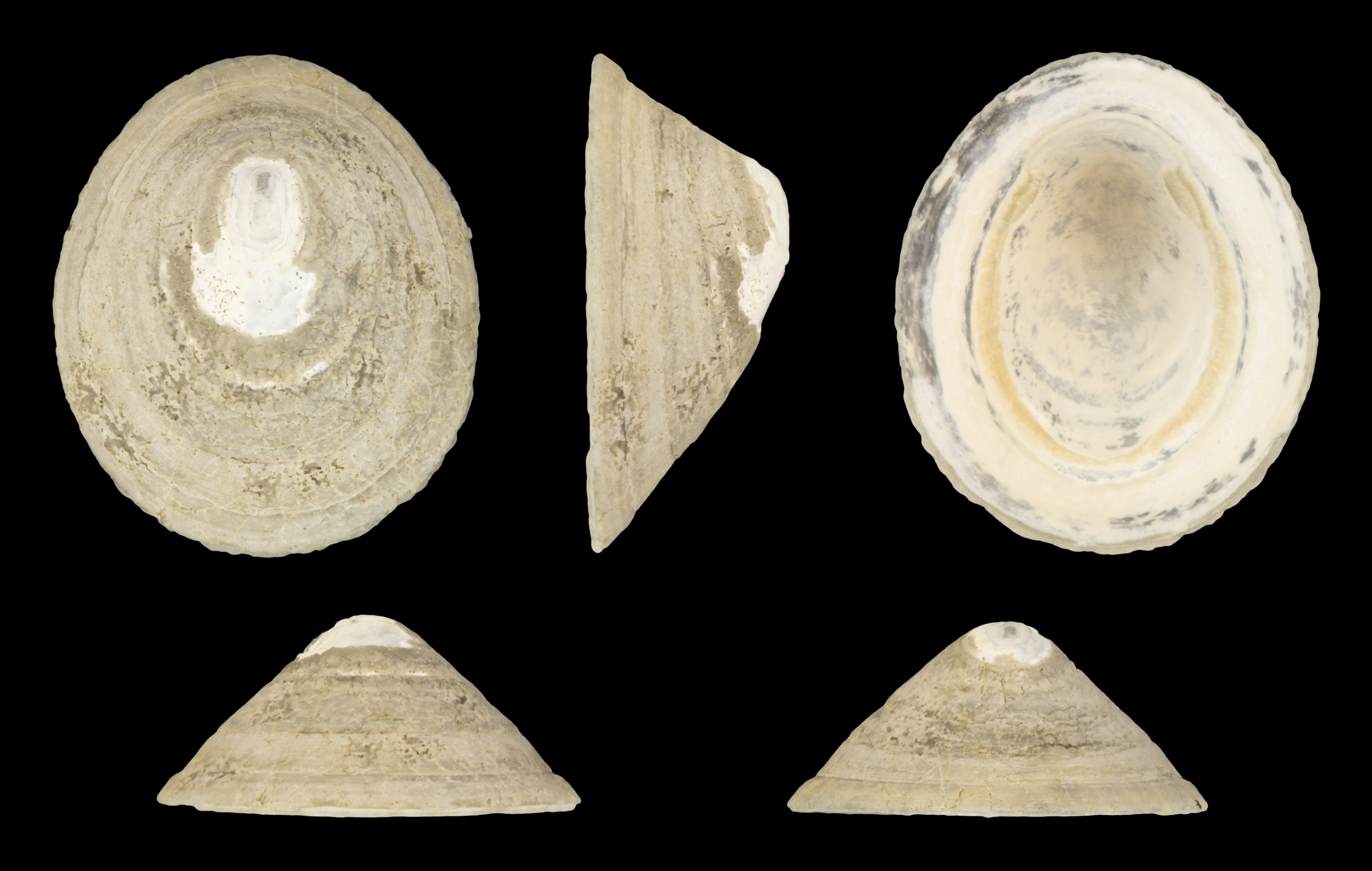
- Shell of † Lepeta scaldensis

Scientific classification
- Kingdom: Animalia
- Phylum: Mollusca
- Class: Gastropoda
- Subclass: Patellogastropoda
- Family: Lepetidae
- Genus: Lepeta; Gray, 1847

Synonyms
- Cryptobranchia Middendorff, 1851 (junior objective synonym); Dallia Jeffreys, 1883 (junior homonym of Dallia Bean, 1878); Lepeta (Cryptobranchia) Middendorff, 1851 (a junior synonym); Lepeta (Cryptoctenidia) Dall, 1918 (Invalid: unnecessary replacement name); Patella (Cryptobranchia) Middendorff, 1851 (Invalid: junior objective synonym of Lepeta Gray, with the same type species)

= Lepeta =

Genus of gastropods

Lepeta is a genus of sea snails, the true limpets, marine gastropod mollusks in the family Lepetidae.

== Species ==
Species within the genus Lepeta include:

- † Lepeta boutillieri (Cossmann, 1888)
- Lepeta caeca (Müller O.F., 1776)
- Lepeta concentrica (Middendorff, 1848)
- † Lepeta duclosii (Deshayes, 1824)
- Lepeta grandis (Crozier, 1966)
- Lepeta kuragiensis (Yokoyama, 1920)
- † Lepeta scaldensis van Regteren Altena, 1954

Species brought into synonymy

- Lepeta albescens (Philippi, 1846): synonym of Iothia albescens (Philippi, 1846)
- Lepeta antarctica E. A. Smith, 1907: synonym of Iothia antarctica (E. A. Smith, 1907): synonym of Iothia emarginuloides (Philippi, 1868) (original combination)
- Lepeta caecoides Carpenter, 1864: synonym of Lepeta caeca (O. F. Müller, 1776)
- Lepeta coppingeri (E. A. Smith, 1881): synonym of Iothia emarginuloides (Philippi, 1868)
- Lepeta costulata Locard, 1898: synonym of Bathysciadium costulatum (Locard, 1898)
- Lepeta depressa Hedley, 1916: synonym of Nacella concinna (Strebel, 1908)
- Lepeta lima Dall, 1918: synonym of Limalepeta lima (Dall, 1918)
- Lepeta puntarenae Mörch, 1860: synonym of Phenacolepas puntarenae (Mörch, 1860) (original combination)
- Lepeta sagamiensis Kuroda & Habe, 1971: synonym of Sagamilepeta sagamiensis (Kuroda & Habe, 1971) (original combination)
