= Iothia emarginuloides =

Scientific classification
- Kingdom: Animalia
- Phylum: Mollusca
- Class: Gastropoda
- Subclass: Patellogastropoda
- Superfamily: Lottioidea
- Family: Lepetidae
- Genus: Iothia
- Species: I. emarginuloides

Binomial name
- Iothia emarginuloides (Philippi, 1868)

Synonyms
- Iothia antarctica (E.A. Smith, 1907); Iothia coppingeri (E.A. Smith, 1881); Iothia coppingeri magellanica Linse, 2002; Iothia fulviformis (Egorova, 1972); Lepeta antarctica E. A. Smith, 1907; Lepeta coppingeri (E. A. Smith, 1881); Patella emarginuloides Philippi, 1868; Pilidium coppingeri (E. A. Smith, 1881); Pilidium fulviformis Egorova, 1972; Tectura (Pilidium) coppingeri E. A. Smith, 1881; Tectura coppingeri E. A. Smith, 1881

Species of gastropod

Iothia emarginuloides is a species of sea snail, a true limpet, a marine gastropod mollusk in the family Lepetidae, one of the families of true limpets. This species was previously known as Iothia coppingeri.

== Taxonomy ==
The type specimens of I. emarginuloides (Philippi, 1868) and I. coppingeri (E.A. Smith, 1881) are very similar in morphology, and were collected only 400 km (250 mi) apart; as long ago as 1908 this led to the recognition that they were probably the same species. Despite this, they continued to be treated as two separate species until 2011, when Nakano et al. researched the genus and brought them into synonymy. I. emarginuloides was described before I. coppingeri, so by the rules of zoological nomenclature, the earlier name took priority.

== Description ==
I. emarginuloides is a small, broadly ovate, cap-shaped limpet, with a length of about 5.5 mm (0.22 in) and width of 4.5 mm (0.18 in). The apex of the shell is towards the anterior end, and is rather acute, but does not curl over. The shell is thin, and has fine sculptured lines radiating from the apex which formed the basis for the species' descriptive name, emarginuloides, "as if minutely emarginate, or finely notched". There are also irregular, concentric growth rings. The margin is smooth apart from the fine crenelations produced by the radial sculpture. The shell is a "dirty white" colour, with a few greyish concentric bands. Although limpets in the family Lepetidae are commonly known as "blind limpets", both this species and the closely related Iothia fulva have small, black-pigmented eyes, situated close to the base of the tentacles.

== Distribution ==
I. emarginuloides is known from Antarctica (the Weddell Sea) and southern Chile. Its distribution is probably circum-Antarctic, with its known range extending from the Kerguelen Islands to the Strait of Magellan area. All records are from water shallower than 2,500 m (8,200 ft). It is the commonest animal found living on the red alga Phyllophora antarctica under the sea ice in the vicinity of the Vestfold Hills, Antarctica.
