= Propilidium elegans =

Scientific classification
- Kingdom: Animalia
- Phylum: Mollusca
- Class: Gastropoda
- Subclass: Patellogastropoda
- Family: Lepetidae
- Genus: Propilidium
- Species: P. elegans

Binomial name
- Propilidium elegans A. E. Verrill, 1884

Species of gastropod

Propilidium elegans is a species of sea snail, a true limpet, a marine gastropod mollusc in the family Lepetidae, one of the families of true limpets.
