= Maoricrater explorata =

Scientific classification
- Kingdom: Animalia
- Phylum: Mollusca
- Class: Gastropoda
- Subclass: Patellogastropoda
- Family: Lepetidae
- Genus: Maoricrater
- Species: M. explorata

Binomial name
- Maoricrater explorata (Dell, 1956)

Synonyms
- Notoacmea explorata Dell, 1956

Species of gastropod

Maoricrater explorata is a southern, cold-water species of limpet, a marine gastropod mollusc in the family Lepetidae, the true limpets. It is found in New Zealand.
