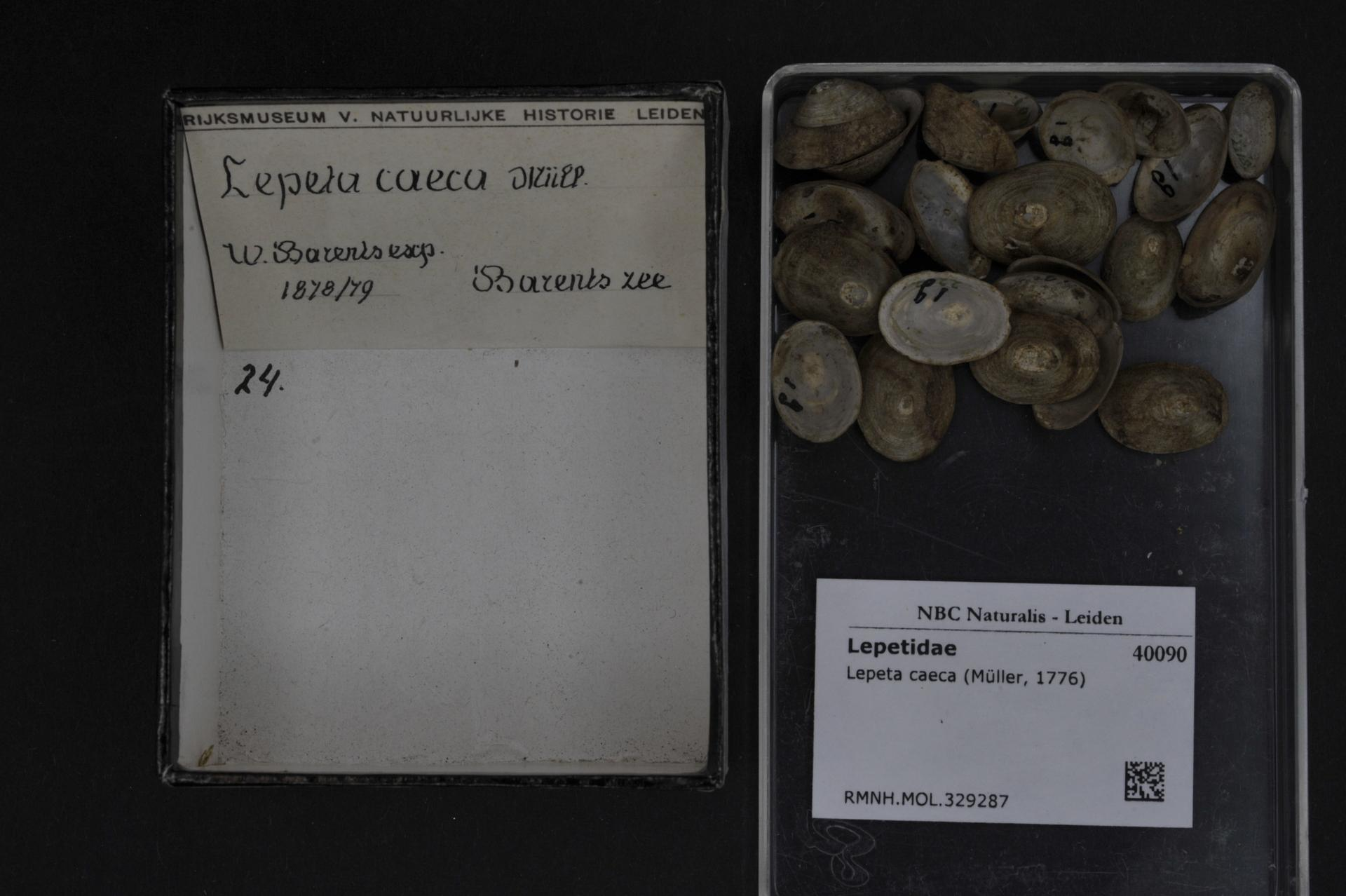
- Lepeta caeca shells

Scientific classification
- Kingdom: Animalia
- Phylum: Mollusca
- Class: Gastropoda
- Subclass: Patellogastropoda
- Family: Lepetidae
- Genus: Lepeta
- Species: L. caeca

Binomial name
- Lepeta caeca (O. F. Müller, 1776)

Synonyms
- Patella caeca Müller, 1776

= Lepeta caeca =

Species of gastropod

Lepeta caeca, common name the northern blind limpet, is a species of sea snail, a true limpet, a marine gastropod mollusc in the family Lepetidae, one of the families of true limpets.

== Distribution ==
They can be found in the Arctic, Northern Pacific, and Northern Atlantic Oceans.

== Description ==
The maximum recorded shell length is 18 mm.

== Habitat ==
Minimum recorded depth is 4 m. Maximum recorded depth is 1097 m.
