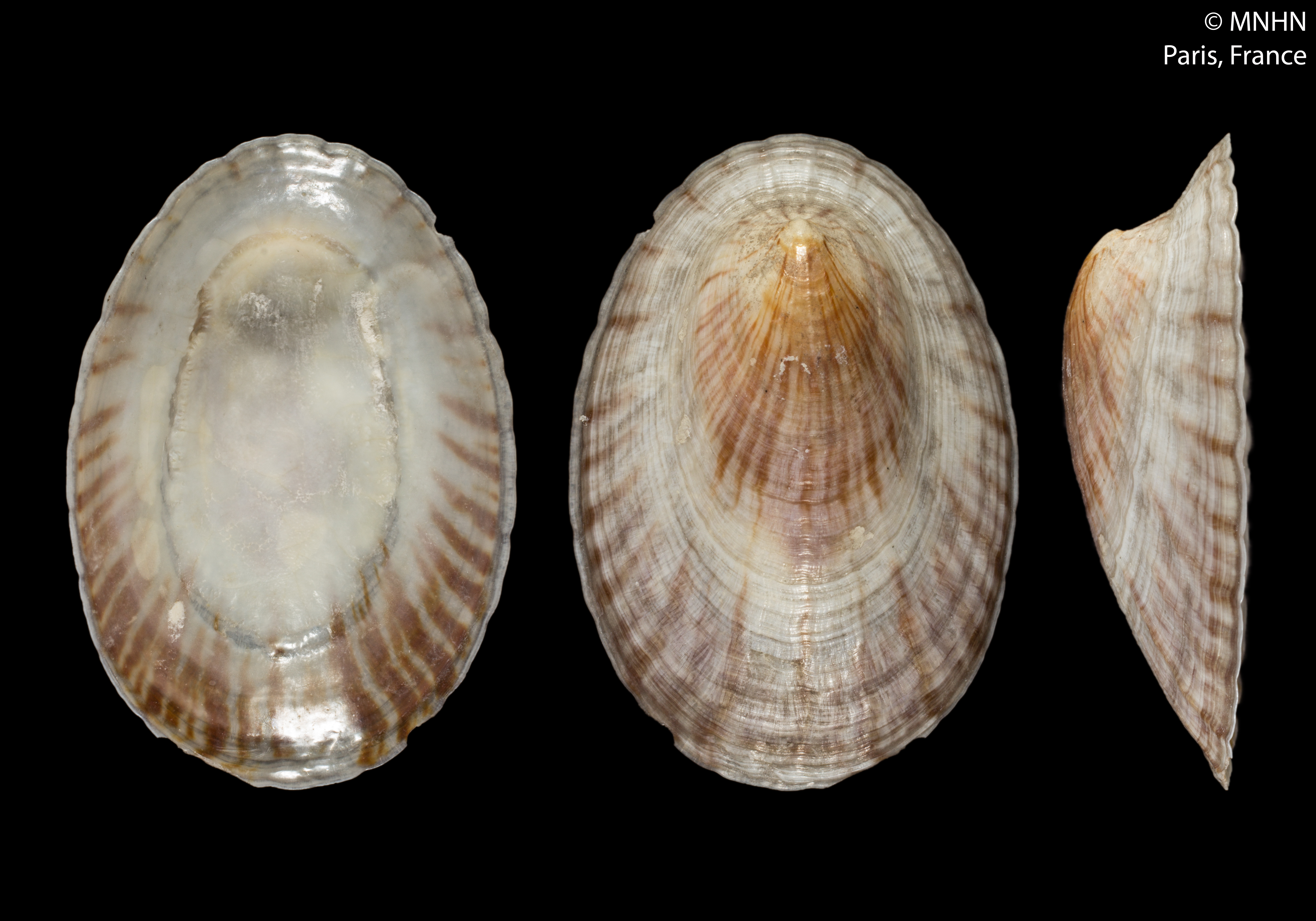
- Nacella deaurata shells (syntype at MNHN, Paris)

Scientific classification
- Kingdom: Animalia
- Phylum: Mollusca
- Class: Gastropoda
- Subclass: Patellogastropoda
- Family: Nacellidae
- Genus: Nacella
- Species: N. deaurata

Binomial name
- Nacella deaurata (Gmelin, 1791)

Synonyms
- Nacella delicatissima (Strebel, 1907); Nacella strigatella Rochebrune & Mabille, 1885; Patella aenea Reeve, 1854; Patella deaurata Gmelin, 1791 (original combination); Patella fuegiensis Reeve, 1855; Patella varicosa Reeve, 1854; Patinella aenea (Reeve, 1854); Patinella delicatissima Strebel, 1907; Nacella fuegiensis (Reeve, 1855); Patinigera fuegiensis (Reeve, 1855)

= Nacella deaurata =

Species of gastropod

Nacella deaurata, sometimes known as the golden limpet, is a species of sea snail, a true limpet, a marine gastropod mollusk in the family Nacellidae, one of the families of true limpets.

== Description ==
It can reach a length of up to 61 mm, although the average length is reported at approximately 36 mm. Nacella deaurata is benthic and found from depths of 0 to 96 m. It is known to feed on microscopic algae. It is smaller than the related and co-occurring N. magellanica.

== Distribution ==
Its primary range is off the southern coasts of Chile and Argentina, and around the Falkland Islands. Specimens have also been found in the southern Indian Ocean, near the Crozet and Kerguelen Islands.
