= Propilidium lissocona =

Scientific classification
- Kingdom: Animalia
- Phylum: Mollusca
- Class: Gastropoda
- Subclass: Patellogastropoda
- Family: Lepetidae
- Genus: Propilidium
- Species: P. lissocona

Binomial name
- Propilidium lissocona (Dall, 1927)

Species of gastropod

Propilidium lissocona is a species of sea snail, a true limpet, a marine gastropod mollusc in the family Lepetidae, one of the families of true limpets.

== Distribution ==
Propilidium lissocona can be found between 30.98°N to 25°N and 81°W to 79.64°W at depths of 155 to 538 meters.
