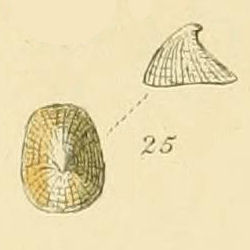
- Propilidium exiguum shell

Scientific classification
- Kingdom: Animalia
- Phylum: Mollusca
- Class: Gastropoda
- Subclass: Patellogastropoda
- Family: Lepetidae
- Genus: Propilidium
- Species: P. exiguum

Binomial name
- Propilidium exiguum (Thompson W., 1844)

Synonyms
- Patella ancyloides Forbes, 1840 (Junior homonym of Patella ancyloide J. de C. Sowerby, 1824.); Patella exigua W. Thompson, 1844

= Propilidium exiguum =

Species of sea snail

Propilidium exiguum is a species of sea snail, a true limpet, a marine gastropod mollusc in the family Lepetidae, one of the families of true limpets.
