= Propilidium curumim =

Scientific classification
- Kingdom: Animalia
- Phylum: Mollusca
- Class: Gastropoda
- Subclass: Patellogastropoda
- Family: Lepetidae
- Genus: Propilidium
- Species: P. curumim

Binomial name
- Propilidium curumim Leal & Simone, 1998

Species of gastropod

Propilidium curumim is a species of sea snail, a true limpet, a marine gastropod mollusc in the family Lepetidae, one of the families of true limpets.
