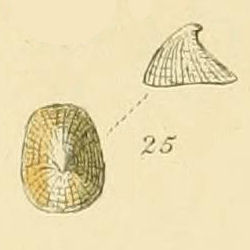
- Propilidium exiguum shell

Scientific classification
- Kingdom: Animalia
- Phylum: Mollusca
- Class: Gastropoda
- Subclass: Patellogastropoda
- Superfamily: Lottioidea
- Family: Lepetidae
- Genus: Propilidium; Forbes & Hanley, 1849

= Propilidium =

Genus of gastropods

Propilidium is a genus of sea snails, the true limpets, marine gastropod molluscs in the family Lepetidae.

== Species ==
Species within the genus Propilidium include:

- Propilidium curumim Leal & Simone, 1998
- Propilidium elegans A. E. Verrill, 1884
- Propilidium exiguum (Thompson W., 1844)
- Propilidium lissocona (Dall, 1927)
- Propilidium pelseneeri Thiele, 1912
- Propilidium pertenue Jeffreys, J.G., 1882
- Propilidium reticulatum (A. E. Verrill, 1885)
- Propilidium tasmanicum (Pilsbry, 1895)
