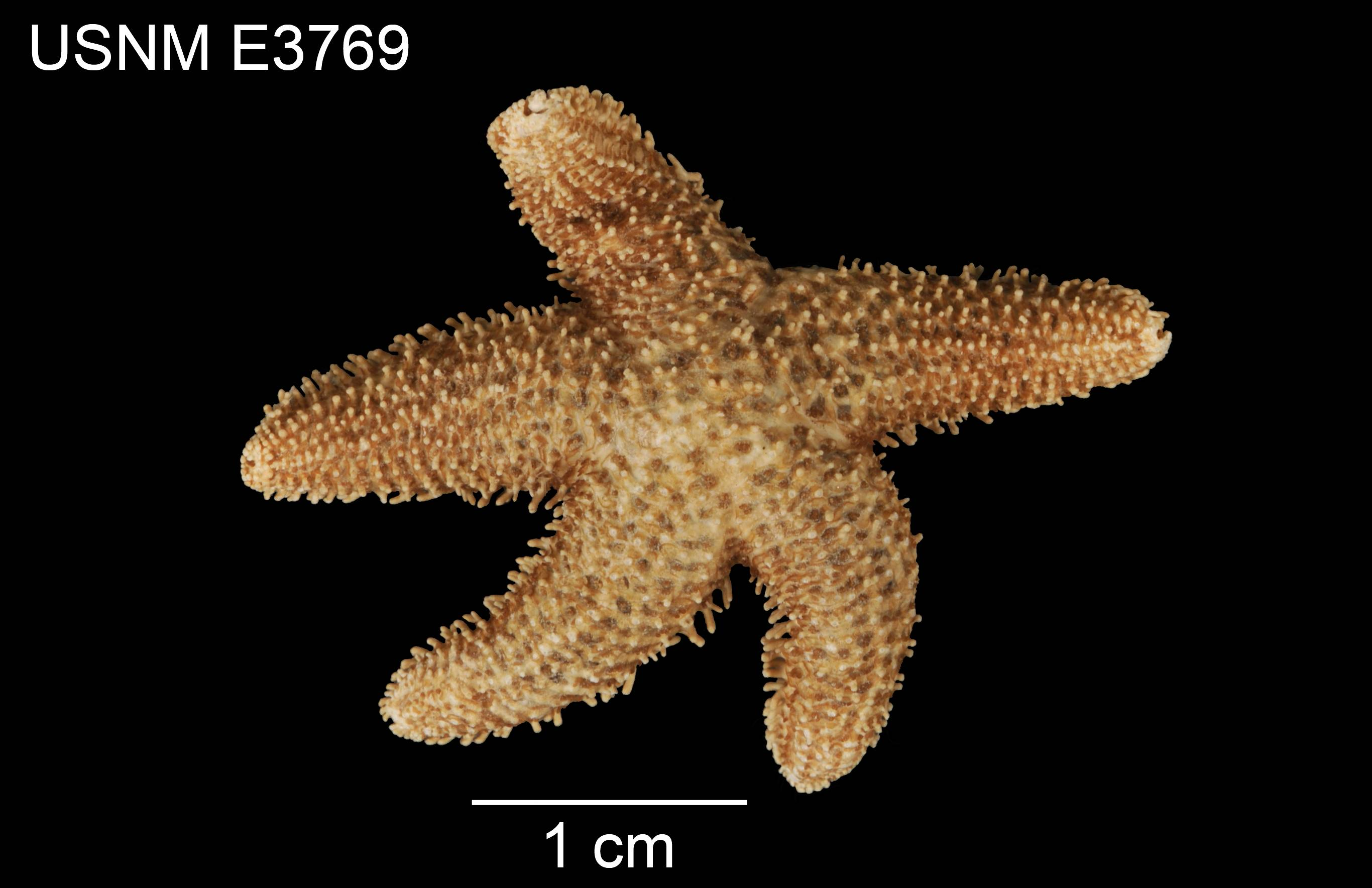

Scientific classification
- Kingdom: Animalia
- Phylum: Echinodermata
- Class: Asteroidea
- Order: Forcipulatida
- Family: Asteriidae
- Genus: Anasterias
- Species: A. rupicola

Binomial name
- Anasterias rupicola (Verrill, 1876)

Synonyms
- Asterias rupicola Verrill, 1876; Sporasterias rupicola (Verrill, 1881)

= Anasterias rupicola =

Species of starfish

Anasterias rupicola is a species of starfish in the family Asteriidae. It is found in shallow waters in the Southern Ocean and sub-Antarctic Indian Ocean.

== Description ==
Anasterias rupicola is a robust, short-limbed starfish. It is a very slow-growing species and is believed to take about 39 years to reach its maximum size of 11 centimetres (4.3 in). The aboral or upper surface is ivory white and covered with blunt tubercles in radially arranged rows. The edges of the arms are fringed with short spines. The oral or under surface has the mouth in the centre and several rows of tube feet running down each ray on either side of the brownish ambulacral groove.

== Distribution and habitat ==
Anasterias rupicola is found in the shallow, cold waters on the coasts of various sub-Antarctic islands in the southern Indian Ocean including the Crozet Islands, Kerguelen Islands and Prince Edward Islands. It occurs just below low tide mark and to a depth of about 5 metres (16 ft) and favours horizontal ledges in sheltered rocky locations, the underside of boulders and horizontal cracks.

== Reproduction ==
The sexes are separate in Anasterias rupicola and the females brood their young. Reproduction probably does not take place annually as, in a study in the summer of 1980, only 30 brooding individuals were collected out of a total of 1400 females. Up to 350 well-yolked eggs measuring 1.10 to 2.10 mm (0.04 to 0.08 in) are found in an egg mass contained in a membrane held by the parent's tube feet near the centre of the oral surface. The eggs, and the juveniles when they hatch, are attached to the membrane by a thread. The eggs are laid in the summer and some of the juveniles are still being brooded nine months later. This parental care may be of particular benefit to this species rather than having planktonic larvae. This is because the island groups in which it lives are very isolated and the brooded young will not be dissipated in an inhospitable ocean but will end up in a location already inhabited by starfish and therefore suitable for their development into adults. In contrast to some other species of starfish, the parent continues to feed while brooding the young.

== Ecology ==
Anasterias rupicola is a carnivore. Even juveniles a few millimetres across actively seek out prey. Smaller starfish feed on isopods, pelecypods and chitons. Larger starfish also feed on amphipods, polychaete worms and the limpet Nacella delesserti, which makes up 90% of its diet by mass. The feeding method depends on the relative size of starfish and victim. Small items are swallowed whole but larger items are tackled by the starfish everting its cardiac stomach over the prey and secreting enzymes to start the digestive process. Faster moving prey animals have sometimes been observed to take refuge under a starfish and subsequently been invaginated.

In the Prince Edward Islands, Anasterias rupicola is the dominant invertebrate predator but it is itself sometimes eaten by seabirds such as the lesser sheathbill (Chionis minor) and the kelp gull (Larus dominicanus).

On the sub-Arctic Marion Island, Nacella delesserti and Anasterias rupicola are the two dominant members of the inshore community. When it reaches a size of about 6 centimetres (2.4 in) long, the limpet is too large for even the largest individual starfish to tackle. Under these circumstances, the starfish adopt a co-operative strategy. If a limpet fleeing from an attacker finds its path blocked by other starfish and has nowhere to which to retreat, it may be overwhelmed. Groups of up to fourteen starfish have been observed feeding on a single large limpet, each with part of their everted stomach inserted under its rim. Some feeding groups of smaller starfish act co-operatively to attack a limpet even though individually they are incapable of preying on limpets of this size. This is advantageous for these small starfish because the limpet is much the commonest available prey species in terms of biomass.
