= Bathylepeta linseae =

Scientific classification
- Kingdom: Animalia
- Phylum: Mollusca
- Class: Gastropoda
- Subclass: Patellogastropoda
- Family: Lepetidae
- Genus: Bathylepeta
- Species: B. linseae

Binomial name
- Bathylepeta linseae Schwabe, 2006

Species of gastropod

Bathylepeta linseae is a species of sea snail, a true limpet, a marine gastropod mollusc in the family Lepetidae, one of the families of true limpets.
