= Pterospermum kingtungense =

Conservation status
- Critically Endangered (IUCN 2.3)

Scientific classification
- Kingdom: Plantae
- Clade: Tracheophytes
- Clade: Angiosperms
- Clade: Eudicots
- Clade: Rosids
- Order: Malvales
- Family: Malvaceae
- Genus: Pterospermum
- Species: P. kingtungense

Binomial name
- Pterospermum kingtungense C.Y. Wu ex Hsue

Species of flowering plant

Pterospermum kingtungense is a species of flowering plant in the family Malvaceae. It is a tree endemic to southwestern Yunnan province of China. It is threatened by habitat loss.
