= Pterospermum yunnanense =

Conservation status
- Critically Endangered (IUCN 2.3)

Scientific classification
- Kingdom: Plantae
- Clade: Tracheophytes
- Clade: Angiosperms
- Clade: Eudicots
- Clade: Rosids
- Order: Malvales
- Family: Malvaceae
- Genus: Pterospermum
- Species: P. yunnanense

Binomial name
- Pterospermum yunnanense Hsue

Species of flowering plant

Pterospermum yunnanense is a species of flowering plant in the family Malvaceae. It is a tree found only in Yiwa, Mengla County and Youluo Mountain, Jinghong in Yunnan, China.
