= Maoricrater =

Scientific classification
- Kingdom: Animalia
- Phylum: Mollusca
- Class: Gastropoda
- Subclass: Patellogastropoda
- Superfamily: Lottioidea
- Family: Lepetidae
- Genus: Maoricrater; Finlay, 1927

Species
- See text

Genus of gastropods

Maoricrater is a genus of true limpets, marine gastropod molluscs in the family Lepetidae, the true limpets. This genus is endemic to New Zealand. It can grow up to 4 mm in length.

== Species ==
Species within the genus Maoricrater include:

- Maoricrater concentrica (von Middendorff, 1847 North Pacific)
- Maoricrater concentrica cryptobranchia (von Middendorff, 1851 America)
- Maoricrater explorata (Dell, 1953 New Zealand)
- Maoricrater lima (Dall, 1918 Indo-Pacific)
