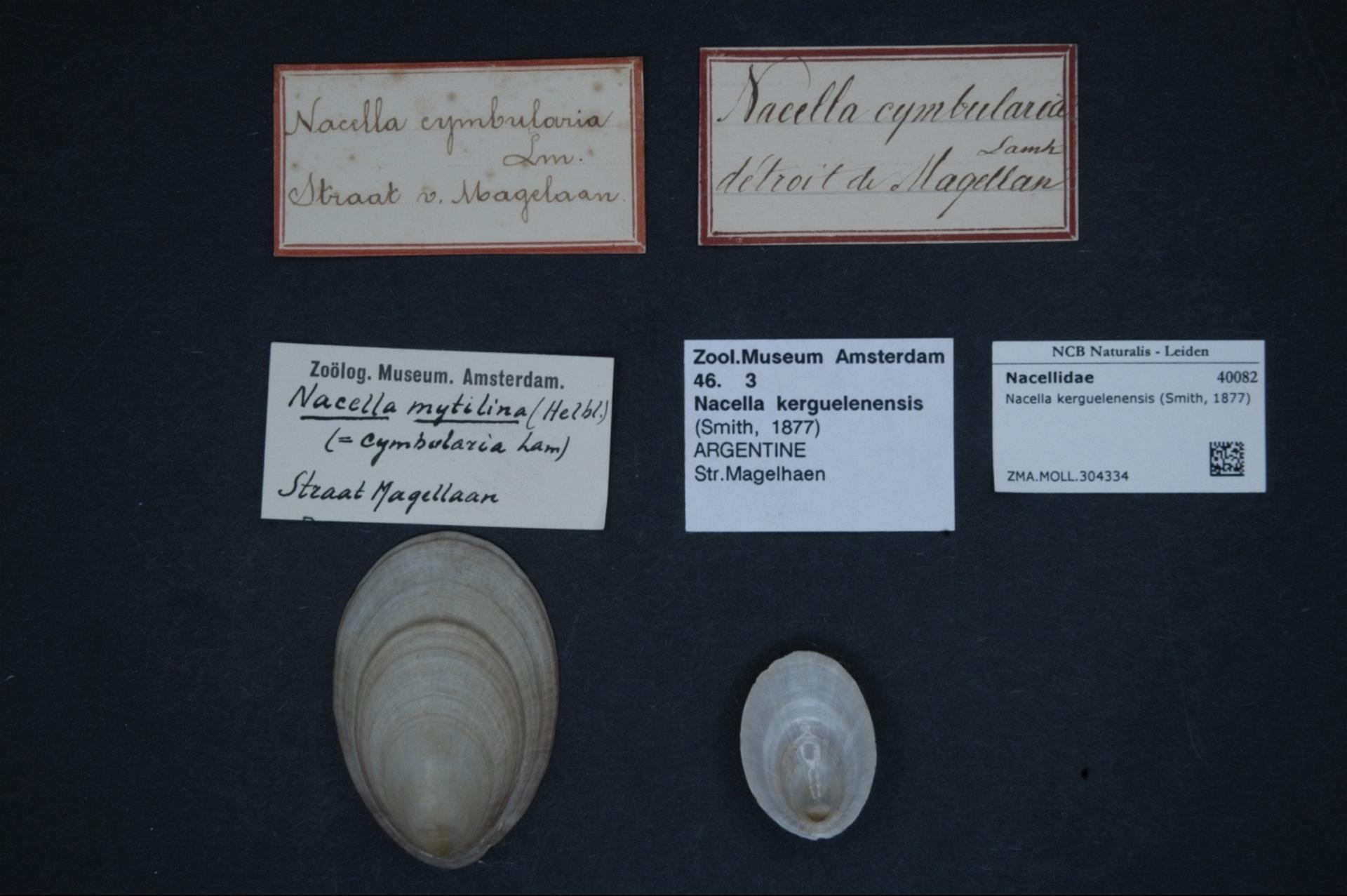

Scientific classification
- Kingdom: Animalia
- Phylum: Mollusca
- Class: Gastropoda
- Subclass: Patellogastropoda
- Family: Nacellidae
- Genus: Nacella
- Species: N. kerguelenensis

Binomial name
- Nacella kerguelenensis (Smith, 1877)

= Nacella kerguelenensis =

Species of gastropod

Nacella kerguelenensis is a southern, cold-water species of limpet, a marine gastropod mollusc in the family Nacellidae, the true limpets.

== Distribution ==
This true limpet is endemic to Australia's sub-Antarctic Macquarie, Heard, and McDonald islands, and France's Kerguélen Islands.
