= Pterospermum menglunense =

Conservation status
- Critically Endangered (IUCN 2.3)

Scientific classification
- Kingdom: Plantae
- Clade: Tracheophytes
- Clade: Angiosperms
- Clade: Eudicots
- Clade: Rosids
- Order: Malvales
- Family: Malvaceae
- Genus: Pterospermum
- Species: P. menglunense

Binomial name
- Pterospermum menglunense H.H.Hsue

Species of flowering plant

Pterospermum menglunense is a species of flowering plant in the family Malvaceae. It is a tree endemic to southern Yunnan province in south-central China.
