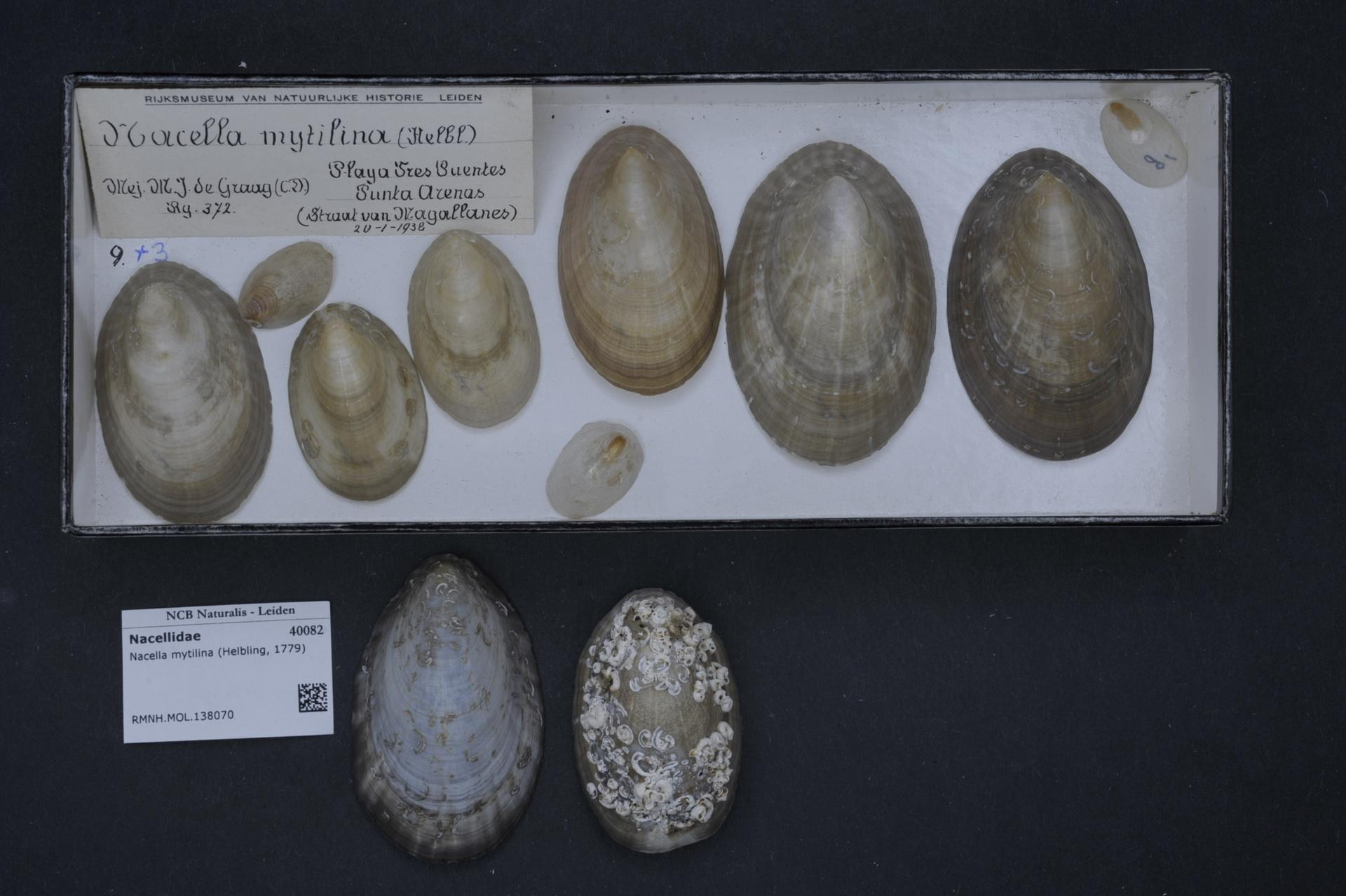

Scientific classification
- Kingdom: Animalia
- Phylum: Mollusca
- Class: Gastropoda
- Subclass: Patellogastropoda
- Family: Nacellidae
- Genus: Nacella
- Species: N. mytilina

Binomial name
- Nacella mytilina (Helbling, 1779)

Synonyms
- Nacella mytiloides Schumacher, 1817; Patella mytilina Helbling, 1779 (original combination)

= Nacella mytilina =

Species of gastropod

Nacella mytilina is a species of sea snail, a true limpet, a marine gastropod mollusc in the family Nacellidae, one of the families of true limpets.
