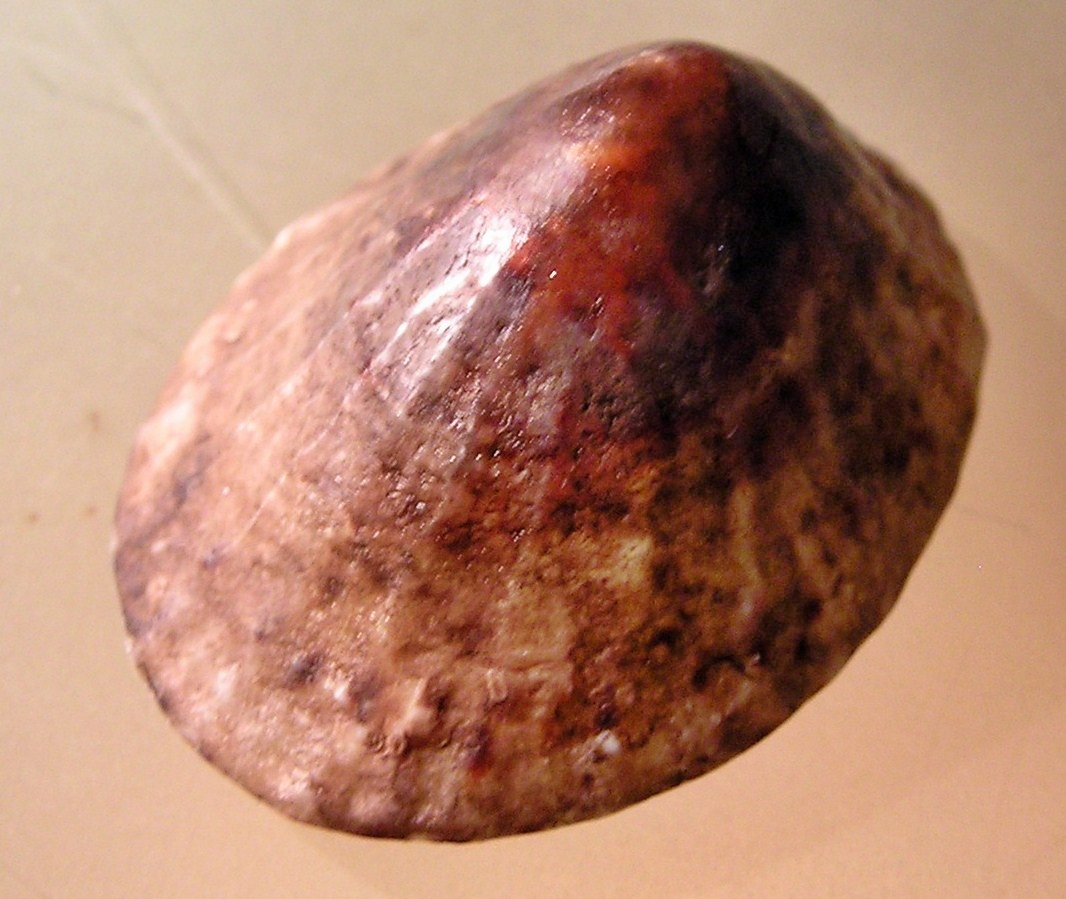
- A shell of Nacella magellanica

Scientific classification
- Kingdom: Animalia
- Phylum: Mollusca
- Class: Gastropoda
- Subclass: Patellogastropoda
- Superfamily: Lottioidea
- Family: Nacellidae
- Genus: Nacella; Schumacher, 1817

Type species
- Nacella mytiloides Schumacher, 1817

Synonyms
- Nacella (Patinigera) Dall, 1905; Patella (Patinella) Dall, 1871; Patinella Dall, 1871 (invalid: junior homonym of Patinella Gray, 1848; Patinigera is a replacement name); Patinigera Dall, 1905

= Nacella =

Genus of gastropods

Nacella is a southern, cold-water genus of true limpets, marine gastropod molluscs in the family Nacellidae, the true limpets.

These limpets are found in the littoral zone and sublittoral zone of Antarctic and sub-Antarctic waters including (Tierra del Fuego, Macquarie Island, Kerguelen Island, and Heard and McDonald Islands). The grayish-brown shell is suboval and flattened and the ribbing on the shell is rather flat. The shiny interior of the shell is rust-colored or chocolate-brown.

== Species ==
Species within the genus Nacella include:

- † Nacella autochroa (O. Boettger, 1883)
- † Nacella chalaensis DeVries, 2007
- Nacella clypeater R. P. Lesson, 1831 - Chilean copper limpet
- Nacella concinna Strebel, 1908
- Nacella deaurata J. F. Gmelin, 1791 - Patagonian copper limpet
- Nacella delesserti Philippi, 1849
- Nacella edgari Powell, 1957
- Nacella flammea Gmelin, 1791
- † Nacella intiforma DeVries, 2007
- † Nacella jutsoni (Chapman & Crespin, 1934)
- Nacella kerguelenensis (E. A. Smith, 1877)
- † Nacella lacrima DeVries, 2007
- Nacella macquariensis Finlay, 1927
- Nacella magellanica J. F. Gmelin, 1791 - Magellanic copper limpet
- Nacella mirim Simone, 2024
- Nacella mytilina Helbling, 1779
- † Nacella nielseni DeVries, 2007
- † Nacella oblea DeVries, 2007
- † Nacella oconaensis DeVries, 2007
- † Nacella reicheae DeVries, 2007
- Nacella terroris (Filhol, 1880)
- Nacella yaghana sp. nov. González-Wevar & Nakano, 2019

Species brought into synonymy

- † Nacella baylei Cossmann, 1882: synonym of † Acroreia baylei (Cossmann, 1882) (new combination)
- Nacella cernica H. Adams, 1869: synonym of Cellana livescens (Reeve, 1855)
- Nacella chiloensis (Reeve, 1855): synonym of Nacella magellanica (Gmelin, 1791)
- Nacella compressa Verco, 1906: synonym of Naccula compressa (Verco, 1906)
- Nacella compressa Mabille & Rochebrune, 1889: synonym of Nacella mytilina (Helbling, 1779)
- Nacella crebristriata Verco, 1904: synonym of Asteracmea crebristriata (Verco, 1904)
- Nacella delicatissima Strebel, 1907: represents particular morphotypes of Nacella deaurata (Gmelin, 1791)
- Nacella falklandica Preston, 1913: synonym of Nacella mytilina (Helbling, 1779)
- Nacella flexuosa Hutton, 1873: synonym of Cellana radians (Gmelin, 1791)
- Nacella fuegiensis L. A. Reeve, 1855 - Tierra del Fuego limpet: synonym of Nacella deaurata (Gmelin, 1791)
- Nacella mytiloides Schumacher, 1817: synonym of Nacella mytilina (Helbling, 1779)
- Nacella parva Angas, 1876: synonym of Naccula parva (Angas, 1876)
- Nacella peltoides Carpenter, 1864: synonym of Williamia peltoides (Carpenter, 1864)
- Nacella polaris (Hombron & Jacquinot, 1841): synonym of Nacella concinna (Strebel, 1908)
- Nacella stowae Verco, 1906: synonym of Asteracmea stowae (Verco, 1906)
- Nacella strigatella Rochebrune & Mabille, 1885: synonym of Nacella deaurata (Gmelin, 1791)
- Nacella subspiralis Carpenter, 1864: synonym of Williamia subspiralis (Carpenter, 1864)
- Nacella tasmanica Tate & May, 1900: synonym of Propilidium tasmanicum (Pilsbry, 1895) (junior synonym)
- Nacella venosa (Reeve, 1855): synonym of Nacella magellanica (Gmelin, 1791)
