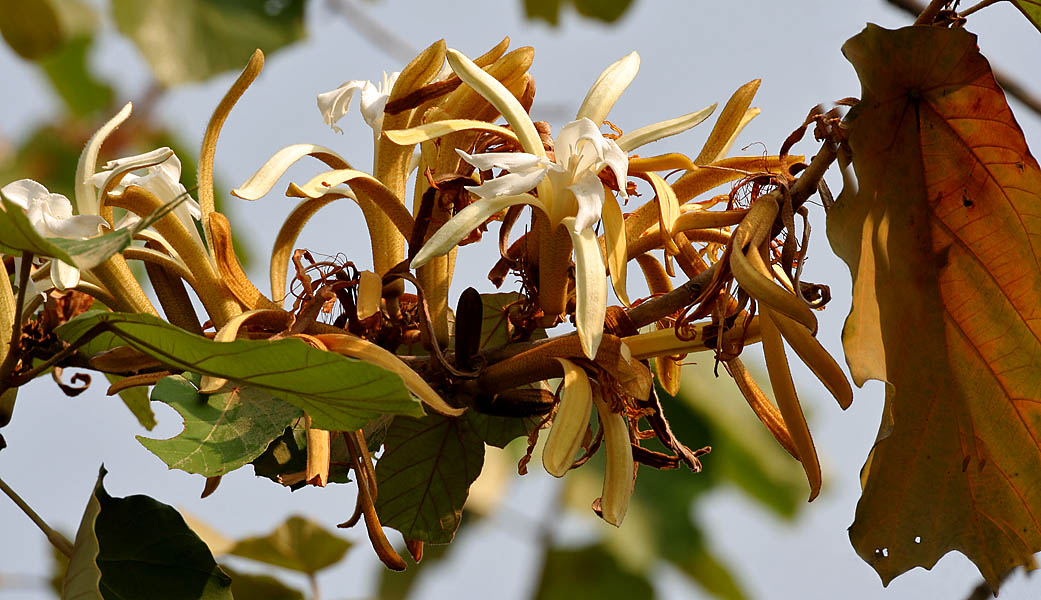

Conservation status
- Least Concern (IUCN 3.1)

Scientific classification
- Kingdom: Plantae
- Clade: Tracheophytes
- Clade: Angiosperms
- Clade: Eudicots
- Clade: Rosids
- Order: Malvales
- Family: Malvaceae
- Genus: Pterospermum
- Species: P. acerifolium

Binomial name
- Pterospermum acerifolium (L.) Willd.

= Pterospermum acerifolium =

Species of flowering plant

Pterospermum acerifolium, the bayur tree or karnikara tree, is a flowering plant indigenous to Southeast Asia, from India to Burma. It is most likely to grow naturally along forested stream banks. The best growing conditions are a seasonally moist then dry climate with access to full sunlight. Pterospermum acerifolium is an angiosperm that is traditionally included in the family Sterculiaceae; however, it is grouped in the expanded family Malvaceae as well. The classification Pterospermum is based on two Greek words, Pteron and Sperma, meaning "winged seed" and the species name acerifolium indicates leaves shaped like a maple's. There is an array of common names for Pterospermum acerifolium, depending on the region where it is grown. It is commonly referred to as Kanak Champa, Muchakunda or Karnikar Tree within its native range. In the Philippines, it is known as Bayog. Other common names include bayur tree, maple-leafed bayur tree, and dinner plate tree. It is a relatively a large tree, growing up to thirty meters tall. Mostly planted as an ornamental or shade tree, the leaves, flowers, and wood of a bayur tree can serve a variety of functions.

== Description ==
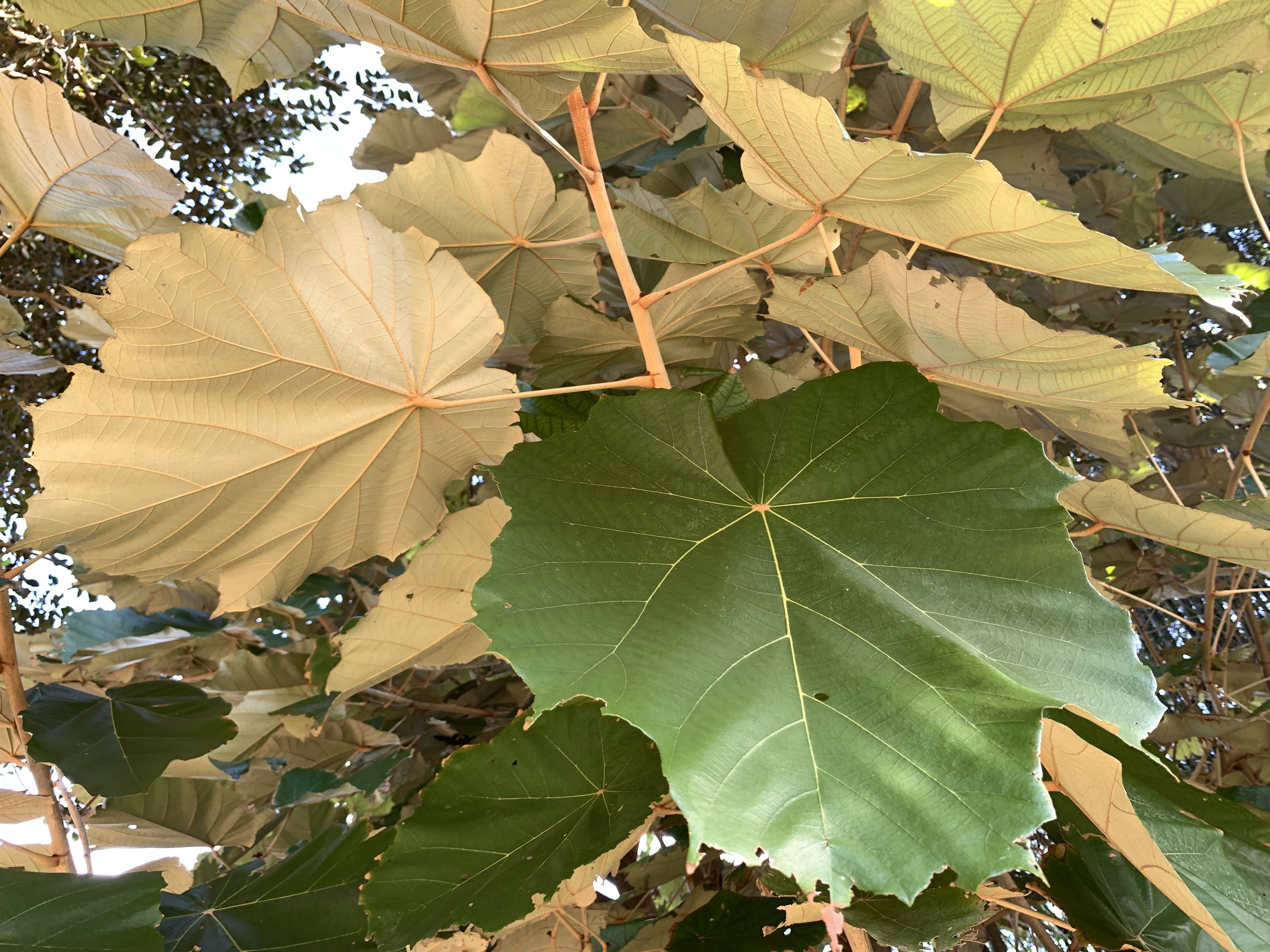
Leaves in Florida

The bark of the bayur tree is grey in color and is considered to be fairly soft. Small twigs and new growth can sometimes seem feathery and are commonly more of a rusty-brown color. The leaves of the tree are palmately ribbed and have stipules. The leaves grow in an alternate arrangement. Leaf shape can range from oblong, broadly obovate to ovate. Leaf edges are commonly dentate (toothed) or irregularly lobed. Many leaves tend to droop downward, giving the tree the appearance that it is wilting, when in fact it could have a sufficient amount of water available. The top side of the leaves is a dark green color with a glabrescent texture. The leaves are rough and rubbery to limit the loss of moisture in a hot climate. The leaves do not tear even on crumpling. The bottom side of the leaves range from a silver to rust color and are pubescent. Leaves have a peltate blade base, meaning the insertion of the petiole is at the center of the leaf. Pollen is spherical with spikes and approximately 60 microns in size.

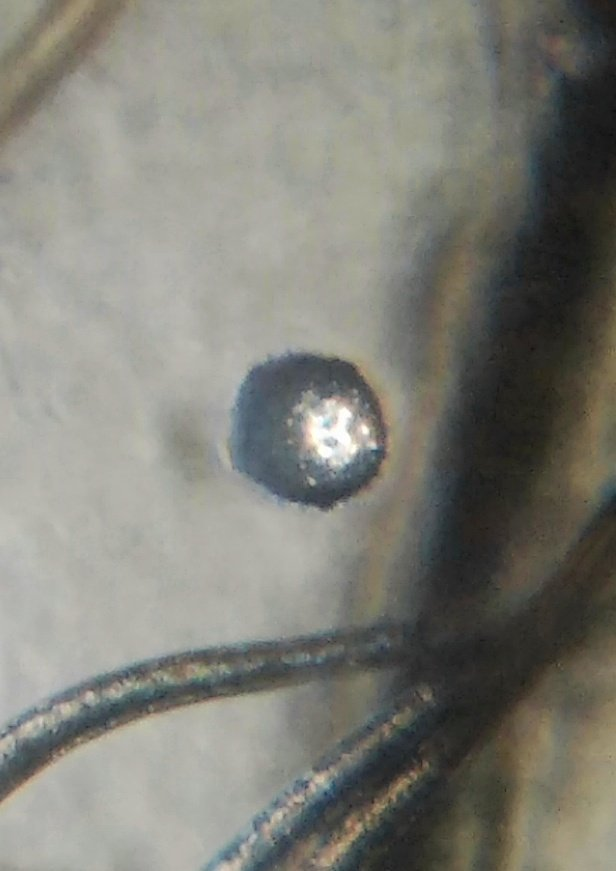
Pollen of Pterospermum acerifolium

== Reproduction ==
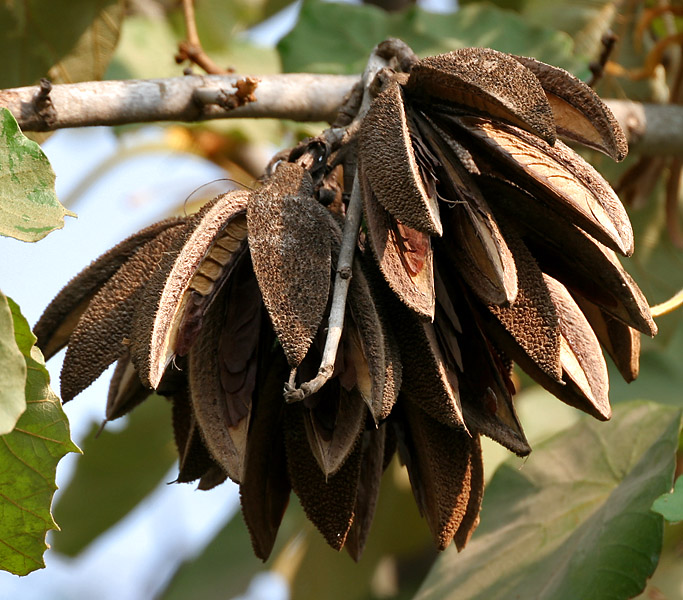
Fruit in Hyderabad, India.

The bayur tree produces large, white, finger-shaped flowers in the spring. Flowers begin as one long bud, then separating into five more slender sepals as it matures. Each sepal can be up to seven inches long. The sepals of the flower curl outward and around the white and gold stamen located at the center. The flowers are nocturnal and exceptionally fragrant, suggesting they attract moths for pollination. Successfully pollinated flowers produce a fruit in the form of a hard capsule. The fruit has a very rough texture and is sometimes covered in brown hairs. Fruits can take a very long time to completely mature; up to an entire year. The capsule then splits open releasing a massive number of "winged seeds." Because it takes such a long period to reproduce, it seems the bayur tree can be out-competed by other faster growing plants. It is not widely distributed or common in natural environments, but is popular plant in gardens and landscaping.

== Uses ==
As mentioned before, one of the common names for Pterospermum acerifolium is the dinner plate tree. The utilization of the leaves is exactly what the name depicts. Mature leaves are very large, reaching a length and width of up to thirty five centimeters. They can be used as actual dinner plates or as packaging and storage by wrapping materials inside. In India they are shaped into regular dinner plates and soup bowls on moulds, some even stitched together with twigs. In Burma they are also used to dry tobacco upon. The leaves can also serve as a primitive method of re-enforcing roofs and preventing leaks. The pubescent under surface of the leaves is said to stop bleeding and can be used as tinder for a means of sparking fires. The flowers of the bayur tree can serve as a pleasant perfume and can even keep away insects. The flowers also provide a number of medicinal uses. An effective tonic can be prepared, as well as being used as a cure for inflammation, ulcers, blood problems, and even tumors. The reddish wood of the bayur tree can be used for planking. Because the wood is soft, it is not considered to be very strong. However it is incredibly durable and somewhat flexible, making it perfect for planking and wooden boxes. The bayur tree even serves a cultural function. Local Hindu people employ the plant for religious purposes. Its bark is also supposed to be used in case of scabies and topical preparation in lipsticks.
