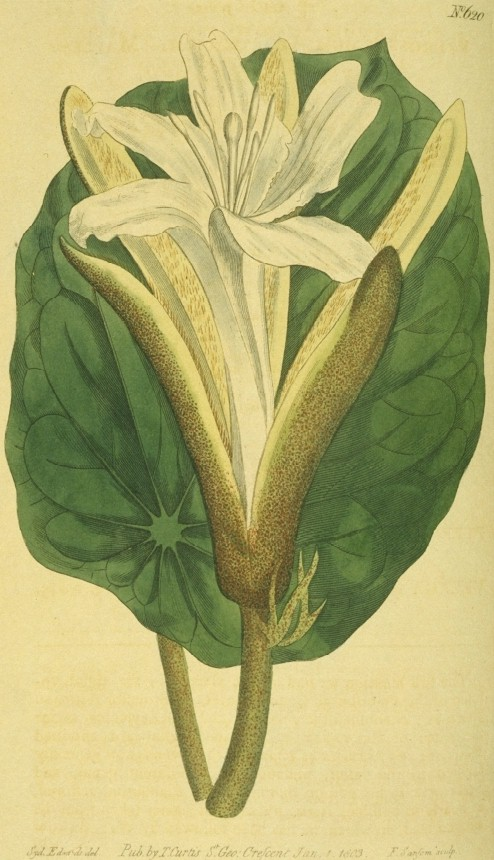
- Pterospermum acerifolium

Scientific classification
- Kingdom: Plantae
- Clade: Tracheophytes
- Clade: Angiosperms
- Clade: Eudicots
- Clade: Rosids
- Order: Malvales
- Family: Malvaceae
- Subfamily: Dombeyoideae
- Genus: Pterospermum; Schreb.

Species
- See text

Synonyms
- Pterospermodendron Kuntze; Sczegleewia Turcz. Valliera Ruiz & Pav. Velaga Adans.

= Pterospermum =

Genus of trees

Pterospermum is a genus of flowering plants in the mallow family Malvaceae. Its species are tropical trees that range from southern China across tropical Asia.

Traditionally included in the family Sterculiaceae, it is included in the expanded Malvaceae in the APG and most subsequent systematics. Pterospermum is based on two Greek words, "Pteron" and "Sperma," meaning "winged seed."

Some species are grown ornamentally while others are valued for their timber.

== Species ==
To date, the following species names have been resolved:

1. Pterospermum acerifolium (L.) Willd.
2. Pterospermum aceroides Wall. ex Kurz
3. Pterospermum angustifolium Tardieu
4. Pterospermum argenteum Tardieu
5. Pterospermum aureum S.K.Ganesan
6. Pterospermum blumeanum Korth.
7. Pterospermum borneense S.K.Ganesan
8. Pterospermum burmannianum Hochr.
9. Pterospermum celebicum Miq.
10. Pterospermum cinnamomeum Kurz
11. Pterospermum cumingii Merr. & Rolfe
12. Pterospermum diversifolium Blume
13. Pterospermum elmeri Merr.
14. Pterospermum elongatum Korth.
15. Pterospermum fuscum Korth.
16. Pterospermum glabrum S.K.Ganesan
17. Pterospermum grande Craib
18. Pterospermum grandiflorum Craib
19. Pterospermum grewiifolium Pierre
20. Pterospermum harmandii Hochr.
21. Pterospermum havilandii S.K.Ganesan
22. Pterospermum heterophyllum Hance
23. Pterospermum jackianum Wall. ex Mast.
24. Pterospermum javanicum Jungh.
25. Pterospermum kingtungense C.Y.Wu ex H.H.Hsue
26. Pterospermum lanceifolium Roxb. ex DC.
27. Pterospermum littorale Craib
28. Pterospermum longipes Merr.
29. Pterospermum megalanthum Merr.
30. Pterospermum megalocarpum Tardieu
31. Pterospermum mengii P.Wilkie
32. Pterospermum menglunense H.H.Hsue
33. Pterospermum merrillianum S.K.Ganesan
34. Pterospermum mucronatum Tardieu
35. Pterospermum niveum S.Vidal
36. Pterospermum obliquum Blanco
37. Pterospermum obtusifolium Wight
38. Pterospermum obtusifolium Wight ex Mast.
39. Pterospermum parvifolium Miq.
40. Pterospermum pecteniforme Kosterm.
41. Pterospermum proteus Burkill
42. Pterospermum reticulatum Wight & Arn.
43. Pterospermum rubiginosum B.Heyne ex G.Don
44. Pterospermum semisagittatum Buch.-Ham. ex Roxb.
45. Pterospermum stapfianum Ridl.
46. Pterospermum suberifolium (L.) Raeusch.
47. Pterospermum subpeltatum C.B.Rob.
48. Pterospermum sumatranum Miq.
49. Pterospermum thorelii Pierre
50. Pterospermum truncatolobatum Gagnep.
51. Pterospermum wilkieanum Doweld
52. Pterospermum xylocarpum (Gaertn.) Oken
53. Pterospermum yunnanense H.H.Hsue
54. Pterospermum zollingerianum S.K.Ganesan

== Images ==
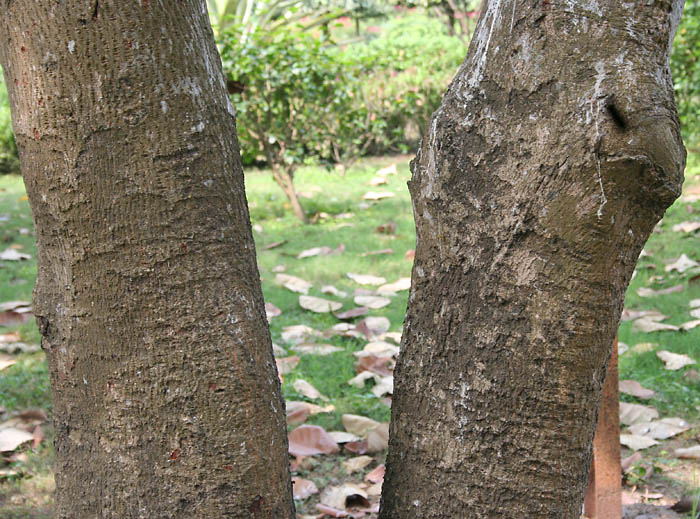
Trunk in Kolkata, West Bengal, India.

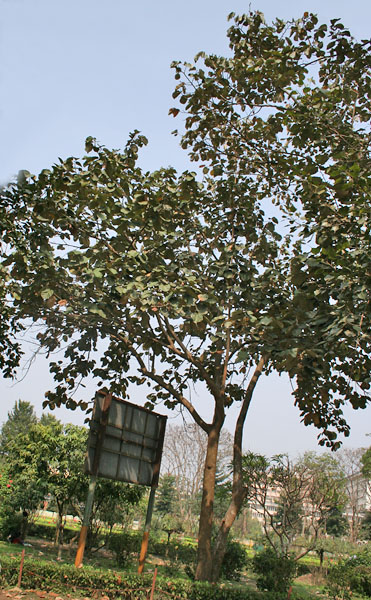
Tree in Kolkata, West Bengal, India.

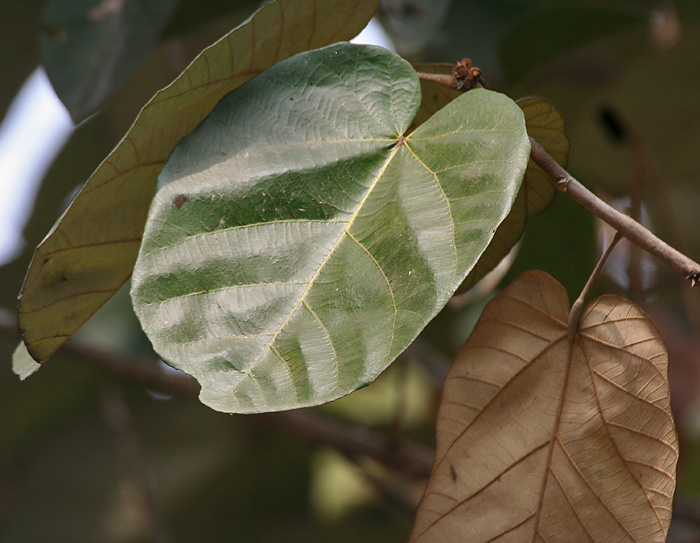
Leaves in Kolkata, West Bengal, India.

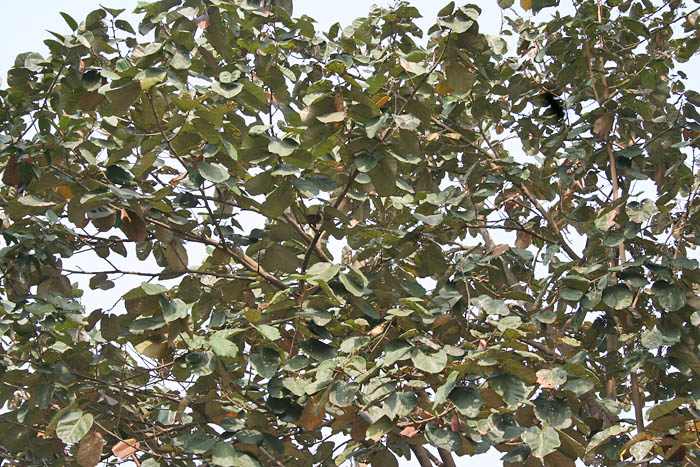
Leaves in Kolkata, West Bengal, India.

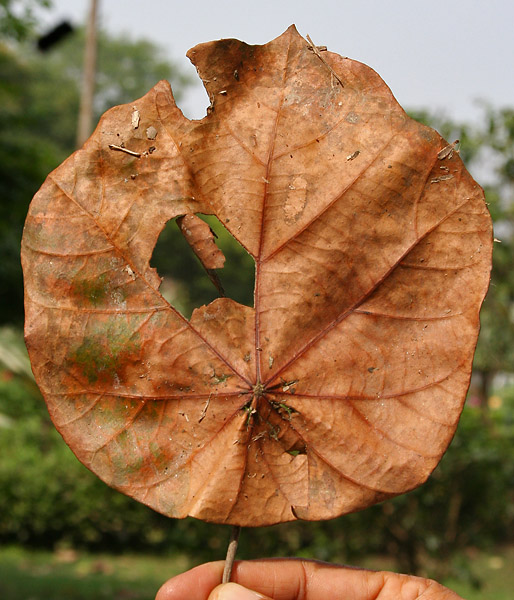
Dry leaf in Kolkata, West Bengal, India.

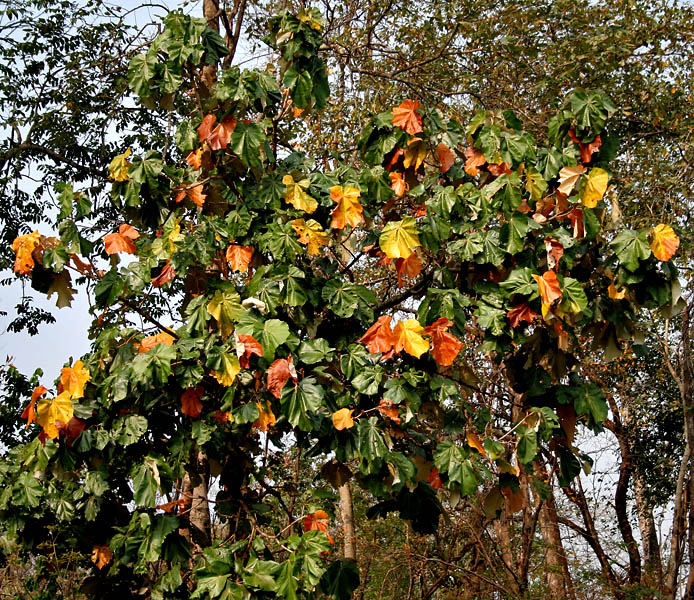
Leaves at Jayanti in Buxa Tiger Reserve in Jalpaiguri district of West Bengal, India.

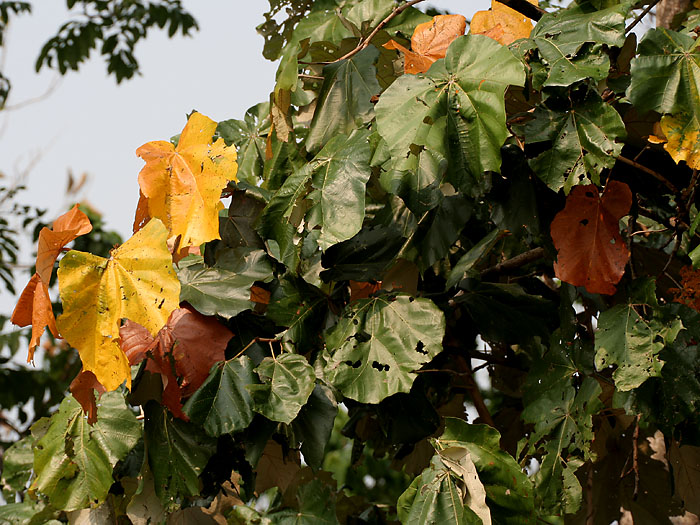
Leaves at Jayanti in Buxa Tiger Reserve in Jalpaiguri district of West Bengal, India.
