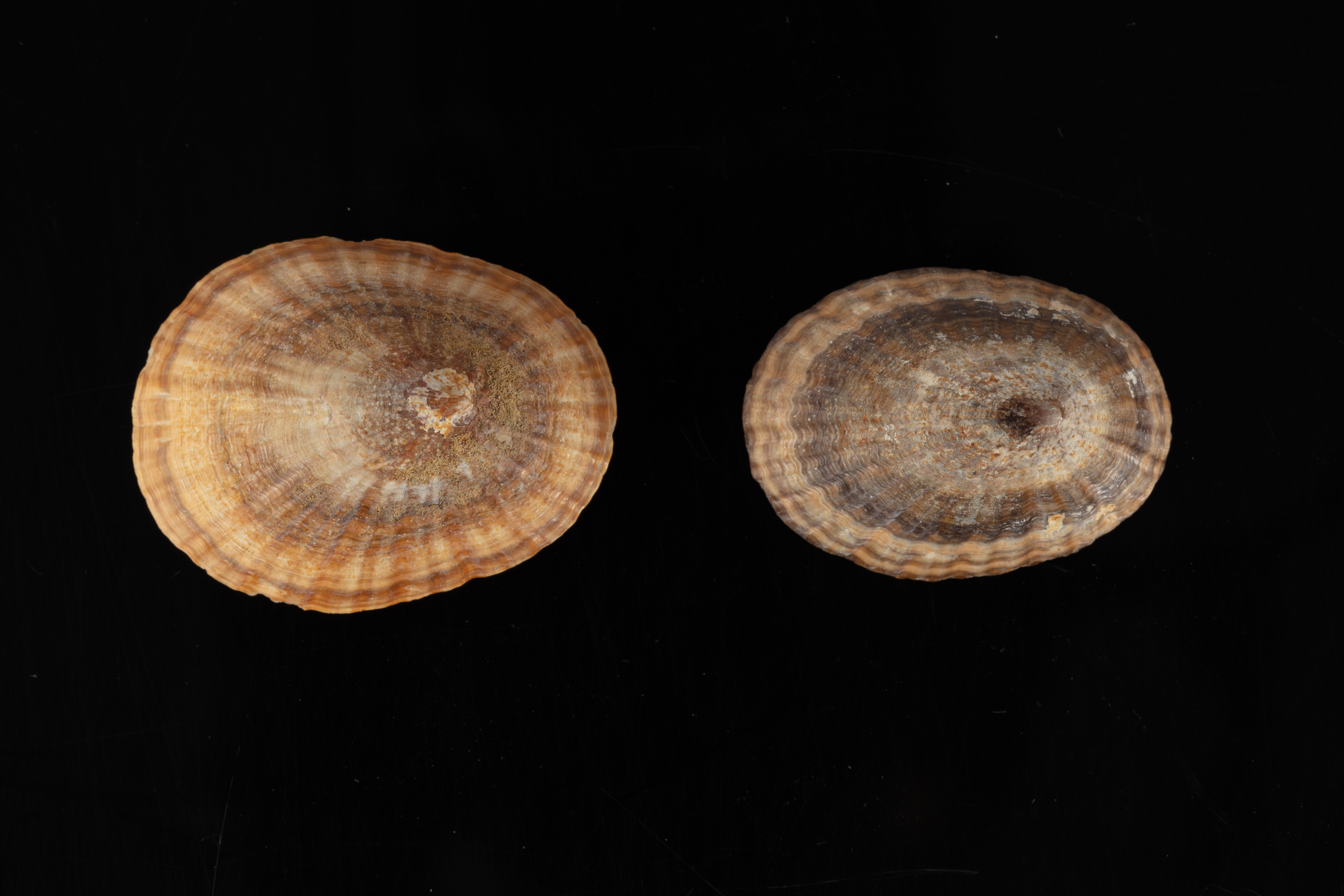
- Shell of Nacella macquariensis

Scientific classification
- Kingdom: Animalia
- Phylum: Mollusca
- Class: Gastropoda
- Subclass: Patellogastropoda
- Family: Nacellidae
- Genus: Nacella
- Species: N. macquariensis

Binomial name
- Nacella macquariensis (Finlay, 1927)

Synonyms
- See text

= Nacella macquariensis =

Species of gastropod

Nacella macquariensis is a species of true limpet, a marine gastropod mollusc in the family Nacellidae. It is found on the lower foreshore and in the shallow sub-littoral zone of certain islands in the southern Indian Ocean and Southern Ocean.

== Taxonomy ==
Nacella macquariensis was named for Macquarie Island, the type location from which it was first described by Finlay in 1927. At that time there was confusion as to the correct nomenclature of the limpets found on the different sub-Arctic islands in the southern Indian Ocean. The limpet Nacella delesserti had been described by Hedley in 1916 and it was unclear whether this, and Nacella fuegiensis (Reeve, 1855) and Nacella illuminata (Gould, 1846) were in fact different species. Finlay determined that the following names should be accepted and the others discontinued:

- Nacella macquariensis – Macquarie Island
- Nacella strigilis (H. & J., 1841) – Auckland Island
- Nacella terroris (Filhol, 1880) – Campbell Island
- Nacella redimiculum (Reeve, 1854) – South Island

== Description ==
Nacella macquariensis is a flattened cone-shaped shell that adheres closely to the surface of a rock. It grows to a length of up to 7 centimetres (2.8 in). The shell is oval and the highest point of the cone is one third of the distance from the end. About twenty shallow ridges radiate from the apex of the cone to the margin which is smooth and unscalloped. The interior of the shell is brown and glossy.

== Distribution and habitat ==
Nacella macquariensis is found in shallow seas in the isolated sub-Antarctic islands of the southern Indian Ocean including Macquarie Island, the Heard Island and the Prince Edward Islands.

== Biology ==
Like other limpets, Nacella macquariensis is a herbivore, crawling over the surface of rocks to graze on the algal spores and the micro-algae that grow there. It also feeds on the blades of larger seaweed and eats detached fronds of the kelp Durvillaea antarctica. It is the only large grazing invertebrate on Marion Island in the Prince Edward Island group and it occurs in great numbers. Among inter-tidal boulders it is found at up to 936 individuals per square metre (11 sq ft) and in the sublittoral zone, 158·per square metre (11 sq ft). In some sublittoral areas where it is very crowded, the limpets climb on the shells of others. In one instance, 42 individuals were found to be stacked up on top of each other.

== Ecology ==
Nacella macquariensis plays an important part in the ecology of the foreshore and sub-littoral zone of the islands where it is found. On Marion Island, it is preyed on by the starfish Anasterias rupicola. This attacks the limpet by humping itself over the top of the shell, inserting part of its cardiac stomach under the rim and secreting digestive juices onto the soft body parts inside. The starfish are usually found on horizontal surfaces while the limpets occupy vertical ones. When attacked, the limpet may evade the predator by moving further up the rock face. Older limpets grow too large for individual starfish to tackle but it has been found that several starfish often undertake co-operative group attacks. One starfish initiates the attack but if there are others in the vicinity, the limpet may have no safe direction in which to retreat. The starfish all converge on the limpet and, inverting their stomachs under the rim of its shell, start to feed. Groups of up to 14 starfish have been observed simultaneously feeding on one large limpet. After about 12 hours, digestion is complete and the starfish move away.

It is also preyed upon by the demersal fish Notothenia coriiceps and the kelp gull (Larus dominicus). Despite these predators, it is a common and relatively fast growing species and is able to hold its own.
