= Propilidium pelseneeri =

Scientific classification
- Kingdom: Animalia
- Phylum: Mollusca
- Class: Gastropoda
- Subclass: Patellogastropoda
- Family: Lepetidae
- Genus: Propilidium
- Species: P. pelseneeri

Binomial name
- Propilidium pelseneeri Thiele, 1912

Species of gastropod

Propilidium pelseneeri is a species of sea snail, a true limpet, a marine gastropod mollusc in the family Lepetidae, one of the families of true limpets.
