= Nacella terroris =

Conservation status
- Not Threatened (NZ TCS)

Scientific classification
- Kingdom: Animalia
- Phylum: Mollusca
- Class: Gastropoda
- Subclass: Patellogastropoda
- Family: Nacellidae
- Genus: Nacella
- Species: N. terroris

Binomial name
- Nacella terroris (Filhol, 1880)

Species of gastropod

Nacella terroris is a southern, cold-water species of sea snail, a limpet, a marine gastropod mollusc in the family Nacellidae, the true limpets.
