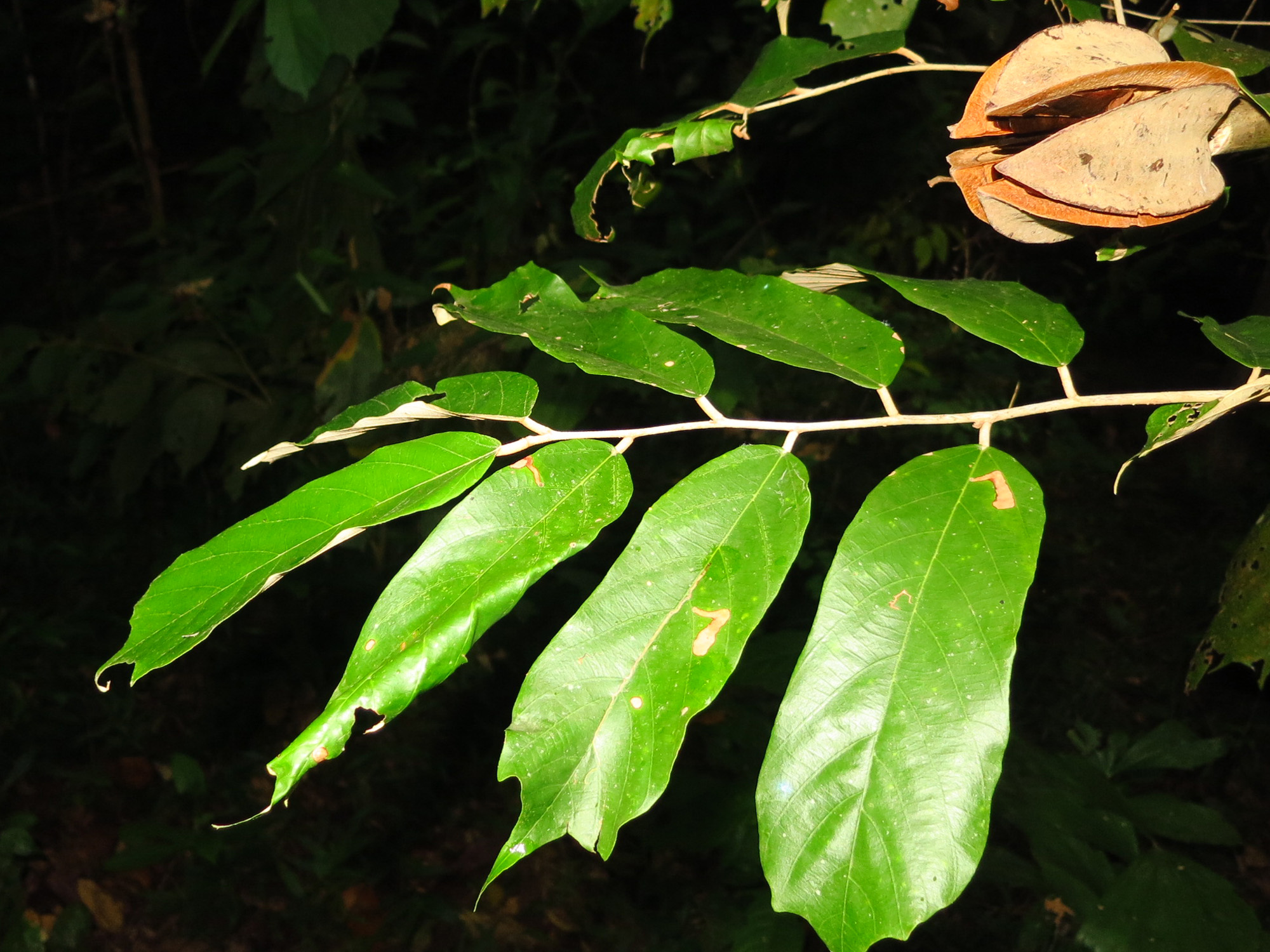
- Leaves and pod: taken in Cat Tien National Park

Scientific classification
- Kingdom: Plantae
- Clade: Tracheophytes
- Clade: Angiosperms
- Clade: Eudicots
- Clade: Rosids
- Order: Malvales
- Family: Malvaceae
- Genus: Pterospermum
- Species: P. grewiifolium

Binomial name
- Pterospermum grewiifolium Pierre

Synonyms
- Pterospermadendron grewiifolium (Pierre) Kuntze; Pterospermum grewiaefolium Pierre

= Pterospermum grewiifolium =

Species of tree

Pterospermum grewiifolium is a tree species, now placed in the family Malvaceae: in the subfamily Dombeyoideae (previously placed in the Sterculiaceae) and described by Jean Baptiste Louis Pierre. in the genus Pterospermum. No subspecies are listed in Plants of the World Online and the species is recorded from Indochina including Peninsular Malaysia. In Viet Nam the species name may be listed as "P. grewiaefolium" and the vernacular names are lòng mang nhỏ and lòng mang lá cò ke.

== Description ==
Pterospermum grewiifolium trees grow up to 35 m in height: they are relatively common in forested areas of central and southern Viet Nam. The characteristic leaves (illustrated) often have yellow hairs. The winged seeds are approximately 20 mm long and produced from approximately 90 mm pods that are stellate in cross section with 5 segments.
