= Bathylepeta =

Scientific classification
- Kingdom: Animalia
- Phylum: Mollusca
- Class: Gastropoda
- Subclass: Patellogastropoda
- Family: Lepetidae
- Genus: Bathylepeta; Moskalev, 1977

Genus of gastropods

Bathylepeta is a genus of sea snails, the true limpets, marine gastropod molluscs in the family Lepetidae.

== Species ==
Species within the genus Bathylepeta include:

- Bathylepeta laevis Moskalev, 1977
- Bathylepeta linseae Schwabe, 2006
- Bathylepeta wadatsumi C. Chen, M. Tsuda & Ishitani, 2025
