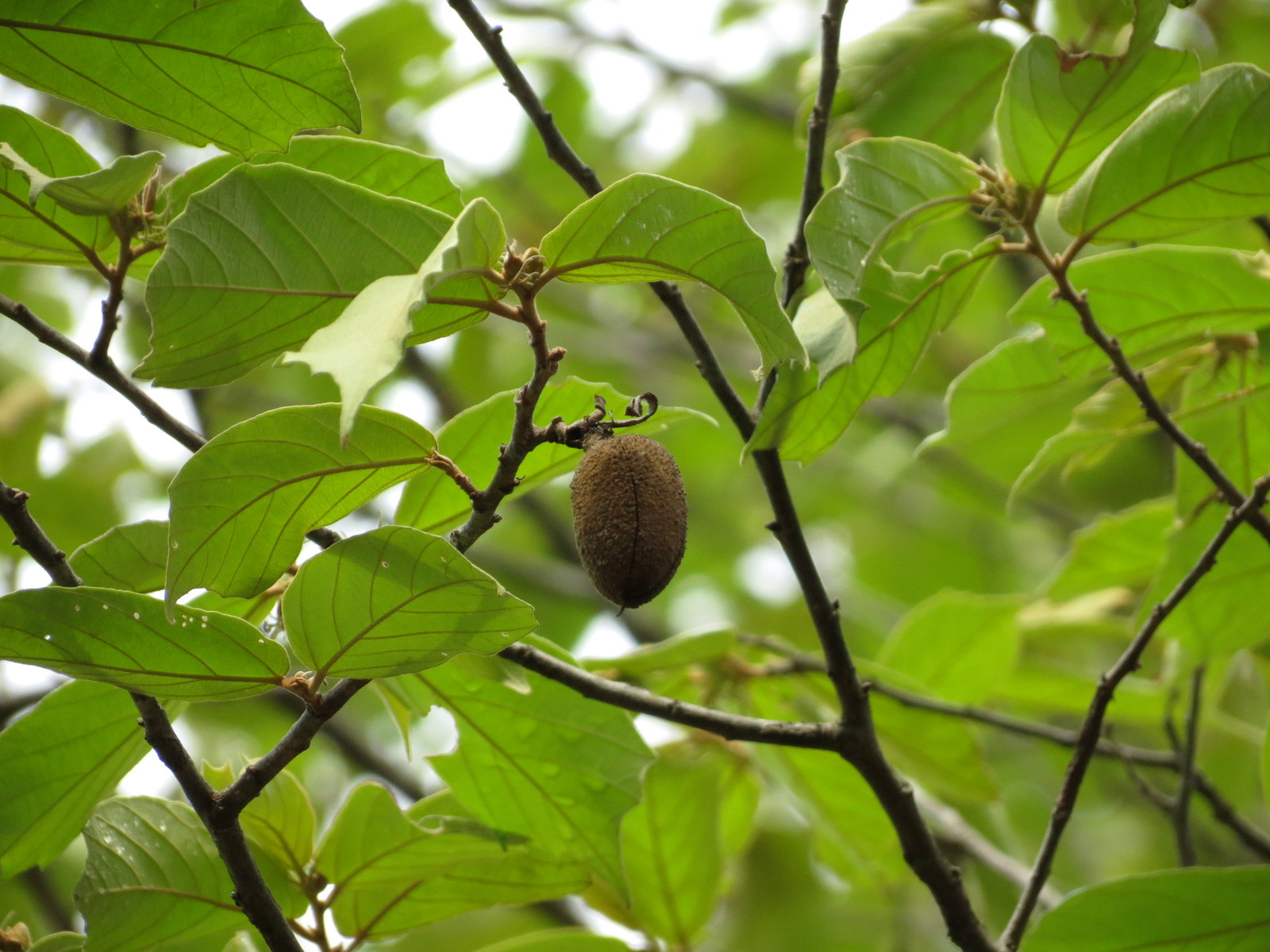

Conservation status
- Vulnerable (IUCN 2.3)

Scientific classification
- Kingdom: Plantae
- Clade: Tracheophytes
- Clade: Angiosperms
- Clade: Eudicots
- Clade: Rosids
- Order: Malvales
- Family: Malvaceae
- Genus: Pterospermum
- Species: P. reticulatum

Binomial name
- Pterospermum reticulatum Wight & Arn.

= Pterospermum reticulatum =

Species of flowering plant

Pterospermum reticulatum is a species of flowering plant in the family Malvaceae. It is found only in India. It is threatened by habitat loss.
