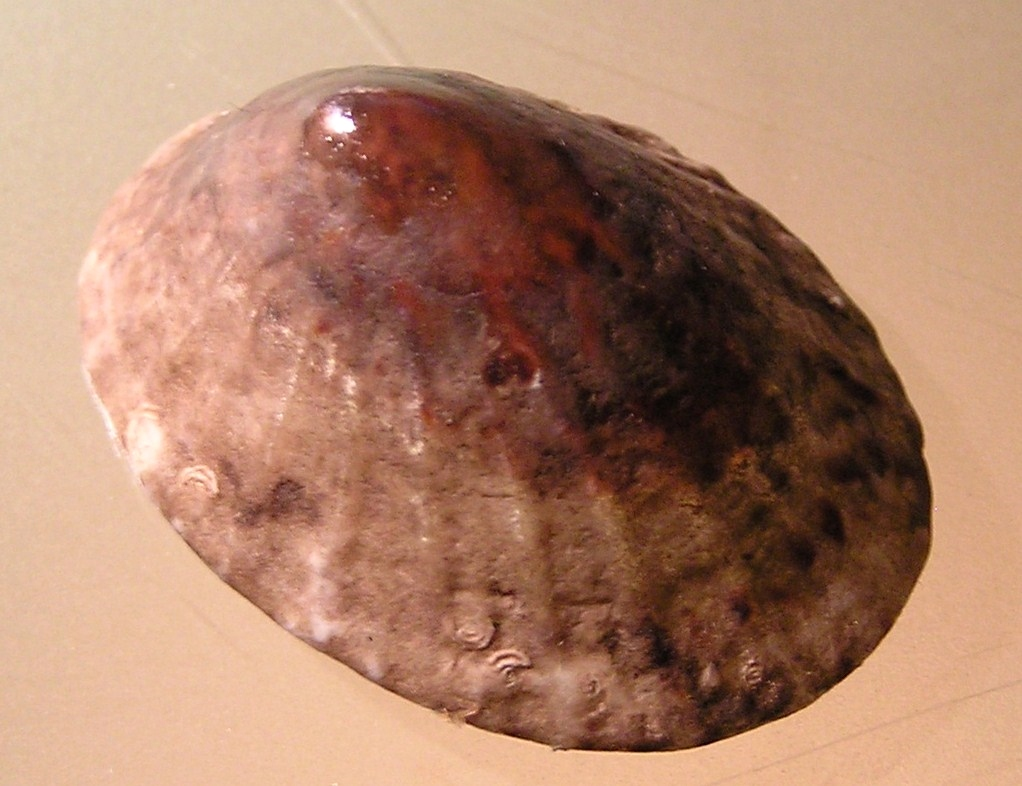

Scientific classification
- Kingdom: Animalia
- Phylum: Mollusca
- Class: Gastropoda
- Subclass: Patellogastropoda
- Family: Nacellidae
- Genus: Nacella
- Species: N. magellanica

Binomial name
- Nacella magellanica (Gmelin, 1791)

Synonyms
- Nacella chiloensis (Reeve, 1855); Nacella venosa (Reeve, 1855); Patella atramentosa Reeve, 1854; Patella chiloensis Reeve, 1855; Patella magellanica Gmelin, 1791 (original combination); Patella meridionalis Rochebrune & Mabille, 1885; Patella metallica Rochebrune & Mabille, 1885; Patella pupillata Rochebrune & Mabille, 1885; Patella tincta Rochebrune & Mabille, 1885; Patella venosa Reeve, 1854; Patinella aenea var. minor Strebel, 1907

= Nacella magellanica =

Species of gastropod

Nacella magellanica is a species of sea snail, a true limpet, a marine gastropod mollusk in the family Nacellidae, one of the families of true limpets.

== Description ==
The length of the shell attains 47 mm.

== Distribution ==
This marine species occurs off Cape Horn, Chili.

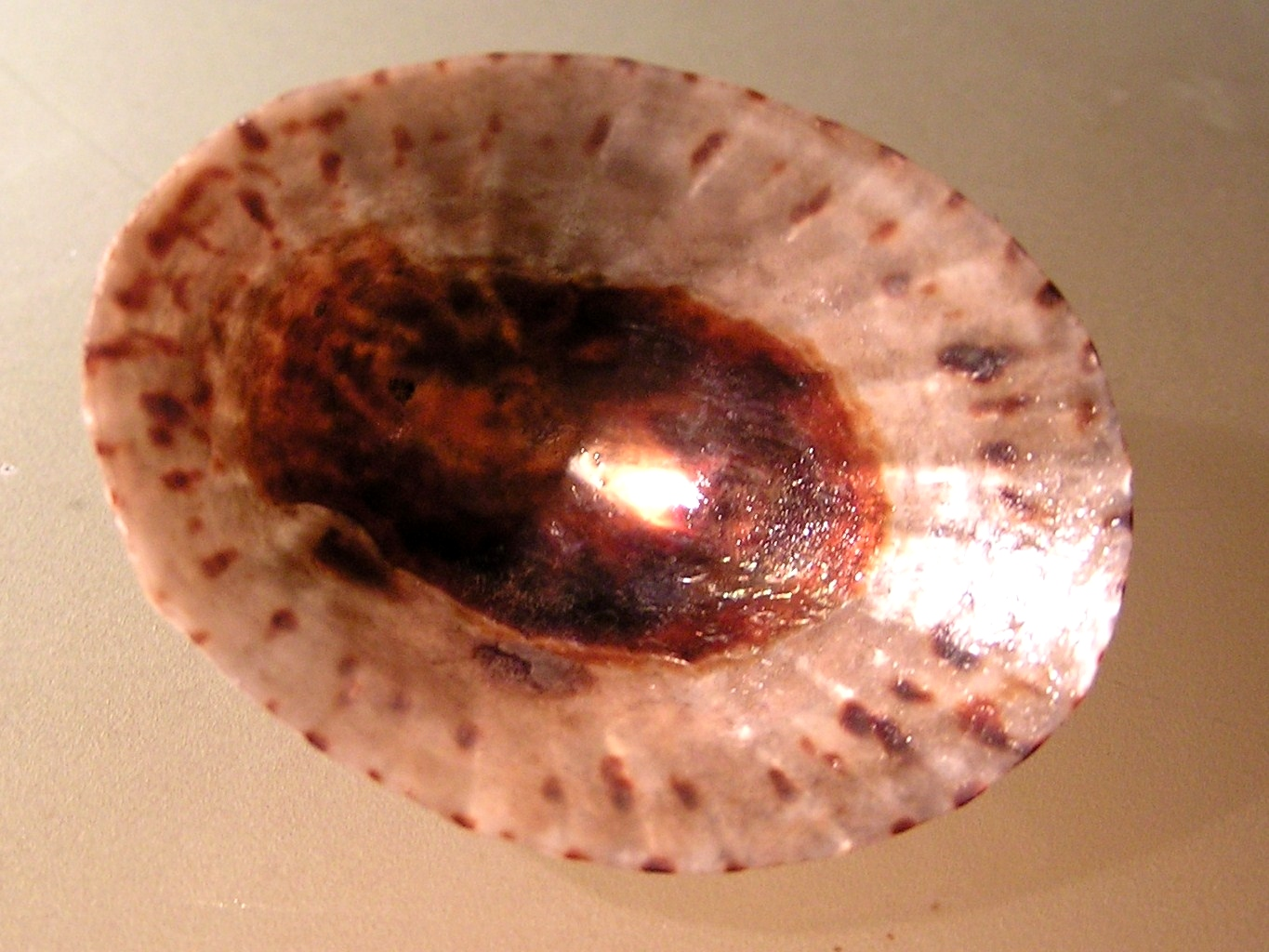
ventral view
