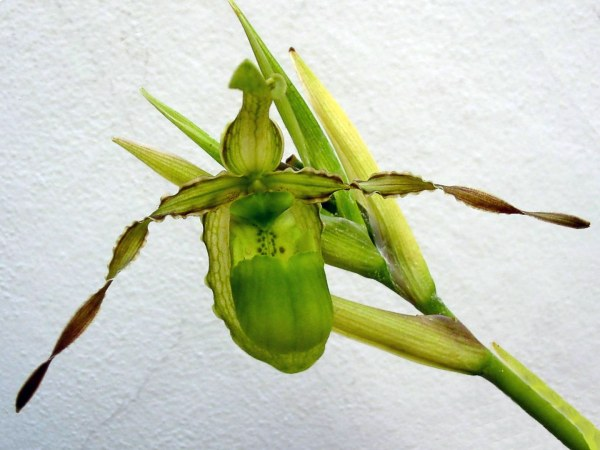
- Flower of Phragmipedium reticulatum

Scientific classification
- Kingdom: Plantae
- Clade: Tracheophytes
- Clade: Angiosperms
- Clade: Monocots
- Order: Asparagales
- Family: Orchidaceae
- Subfamily: Cypripedioideae
- Genus: Phragmipedium
- Species: P. reticulatum

Binomial name
- Phragmipedium reticulatum (Rchb.f.) Schltr.

Synonyms
- Selenipedium reticulatum Rchb.f.; Cypripedium reticulatum (Rchb.f.) Rchb.f.; Paphiopedilum reticulatum (Rchb.f.) Pfitzer

= Phragmipedium reticulatum =

Species of plant

Phragmipedium reticulatum is a species of orchid ranging from southern Ecuador to Peru.
