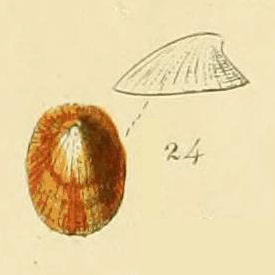
- Iothia fulva shell

Scientific classification
- Kingdom: Animalia
- Phylum: Mollusca
- Class: Gastropoda
- Subclass: Patellogastropoda
- Superfamily: Lottioidea
- Family: Lepetidae
- Genus: Iothia
- Species: I. fulva

Binomial name
- Iothia fulva (O. F. Müller, 1776)

Synonyms
- Patella fulva Müller, 1776

= Iothia fulva =

Species of gastropod

Iothia fulva is a species of sea snail, a true limpet, a marine gastropod mollusk in the family Lepetidae, one of the families of true limpets.

== Distribution ==
This marine species occurs on the Galicia Bank (Northeast Atlantic Ocean).
