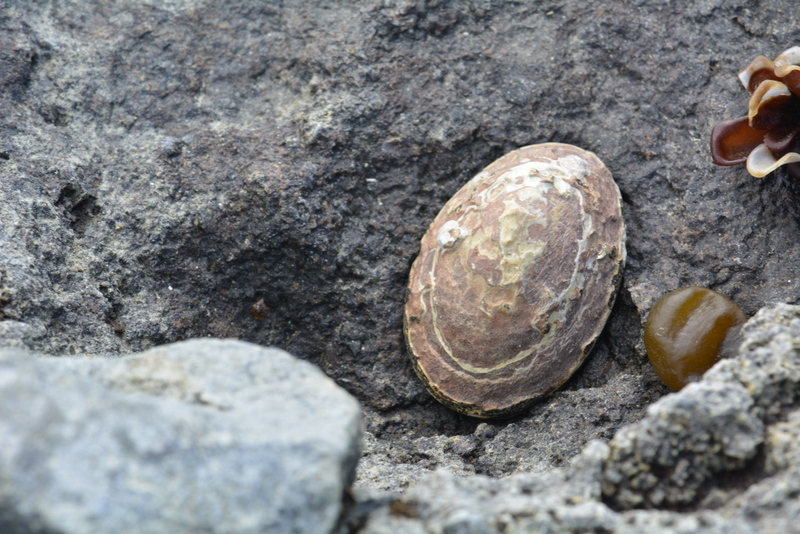

Scientific classification
- Kingdom: Animalia
- Phylum: Mollusca
- Class: Gastropoda
- Subclass: Patellogastropoda
- Family: Nacellidae
- Genus: Nacella
- Species: N. concinna

Binomial name
- Nacella concinna (Strebel, 1908)

Synonyms
- Iothia depressa (Hedley, 1916); Lepeta depressa Hedley, 1916; Nacella (Patinigera) polaris (Hombron & Jacquinot, 1841) (unaccepted combination); Nacella polaris (Hombron & Jacquinot, 1841); Patella polaris Hombron & Jacquinot, 1841 (invalid: junior homonym of Patella polaris Röding, 1798); Patinella polaris (Hombron & Jacquinot, 1841); Patinella polaris var. concinna Strebel, 1908; Patinella polaris var. concinna Strebel, 1908 (original combination); Patinigera concinna (Strebel, 1908); Patinigera polaris (Hombron & Jacquinot, 1841)

= Nacella concinna =

Species of gastropod

Nacella concinna is a species of sea snail, a true limpet, a marine gastropod mollusk in the family Nacellidae, one of the families of true limpets.

== Description ==
The shell of Nacella concinna grows to about 6 centimetres (2.4 in) long with deep water specimens being rather smaller. It is an elongated ovate, moderately elevated cone with a low apex somewhat towards the anterior margin and angled in that direction. There are about 30 faint radial ribs and a series of fine concentric lines that indicate the annual growth rings. The exterior of the shell is varying shades of pale brown and grey and the interior is dark purplish-brown in deep water specimens but creamy-brown in those from shallow water. The mantle has a fringe of short tentacles.

== Distribution ==
Nacella concinna is found on the seabed of the Scotia Sea between Tierra del Fuego and the Antarctic Peninsula. The range includes South Georgia, the South Orkneys, the South Shetlands, Bouvet Island, Seymour Island, Paulet Island, Wandel Island, Anvers Island and Petermann Island. The depth range varies from the inter-tidal zone down to 935 metres (3,068 ft) though most specimens come from shallow waters a few metres deep.

== Biology ==
Nacella concinna moves around on rocks and soft substrates feeding on algae and diatoms. Its growth rate is slow and it is said to grow to 41 millimetres (1.6 in) in 21 years and live as long as 60 years. It is gonochoristic, individuals being either male or female, and fertilisation is external. The larval development has been little studied. Spawning takes place in the spring algal bloom period. Mature adults often synchronise their spawning, forming spawning towers or groups of up to 35 individuals which may persist for a week or more. These structures are considered likely to improve fertilisation rates as sperm flows have been observed to cascade down the towers in calm water situations. Even in moving water, sperm concentrations are higher and fertilisation is more likely to occur.
