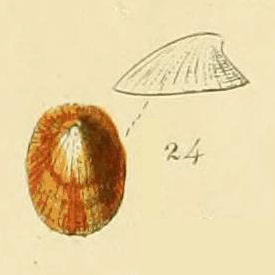
- Iothia fulva shell

Scientific classification
- Kingdom: Animalia
- Phylum: Mollusca
- Class: Gastropoda
- Subclass: Patellogastropoda
- Superfamily: Lottioidea
- Family: Lepetidae; Gray, 1850

= Lepetidae =

Family of gastropods

Lepetidae is a family of sea snails or small, deep-water true limpets, marine gastropod molluscs in the clade Patellogastropoda the true limpets.

== Taxonomy ==
This family consists of the two following subfamilies (according to the taxonomy of the Gastropoda by Bouchet & Rocroi, 2005):

- Lepetinae Gray, 1850
- Propilidiinae Thiele, 1891

A cladogram showing phylogenic relations of Patellogastropoda based on molecular phylogeny research by Nakano & Ozawa (2007):

- Patellogastropoda
  - - - Lottiidae (including Acmaea and Niveotectura)
      - - - Pectinodontidae
          - Lepetidae
        - Nacellidae
    - Patellidae
  - Eoacmaeidae

== Genera ==
Genera in the family Lepetidae include:

Lepetinae

- Bathylepeta Moskalay, 1977
- Cryptobranchia Middendorff, 1851
- Iothia Forbes, 1849
- Lepeta J. E. Gray, 1842
- Limalepeta Moskalev, 1978
- Maoricrater Dell, 1956

Propilidiinae

- Propilidium Forbes and Hanley, 1849
- Sagamilepeta Okutani, 1987
