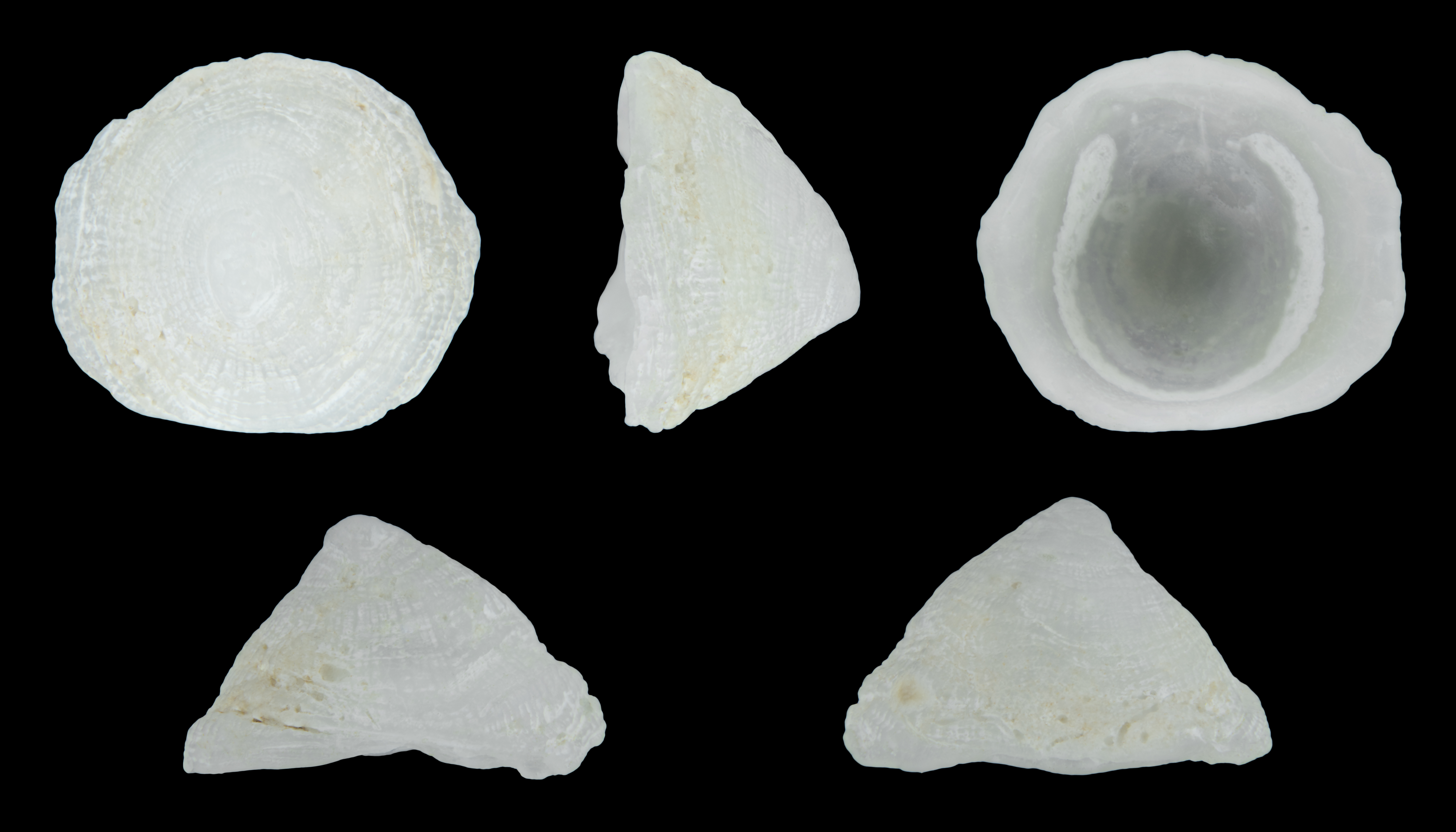

Scientific classification
- Kingdom: Animalia
- Phylum: Mollusca
- Class: Gastropoda
- Subclass: Patellogastropoda
- Family: Pectinodontidae
- Genus: Pectinodonta
- Species: P. maxima

Binomial name
- Pectinodonta maxima (Dautzenberg, 1925)

Synonyms
- Cocculina maxima Dautzenberg, 1925

= Pectinodonta maxima =

Species of gastropod

Pectinodonta maxima is a species of sea snail, a true limpet, a marine gastropod mollusc in the family Pectinodontidae, one of the families of true limpets.
