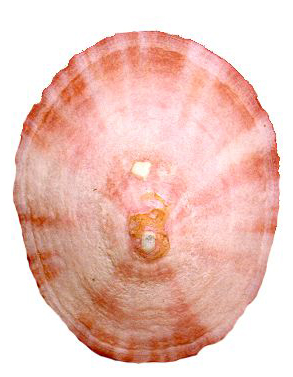
- Shell of Problacmaea sybaritica

Scientific classification
- Kingdom: Animalia
- Phylum: Mollusca
- Class: Gastropoda
- Subclass: Patellogastropoda
- Superfamily: Lottioidea
- Family: Erginidae
- Genus: Problacmaea; Golikov & Kussakin, 1972

Type species
- Problacmaea moskalevi Golikov & Kussakin, 1972

= Problacmaea =

Genus of gastropods

Problacmaea is a genus of sea snails, true limpets, marine gastropod molluscs in the family Erginidae.

== Species ==
- Problacmaea apicina (Dall, 1879)
- Problacmaea moskalevi Golikov & Kussakin, 1972
- Problacmaea sybaritica (Dall, 1871)
