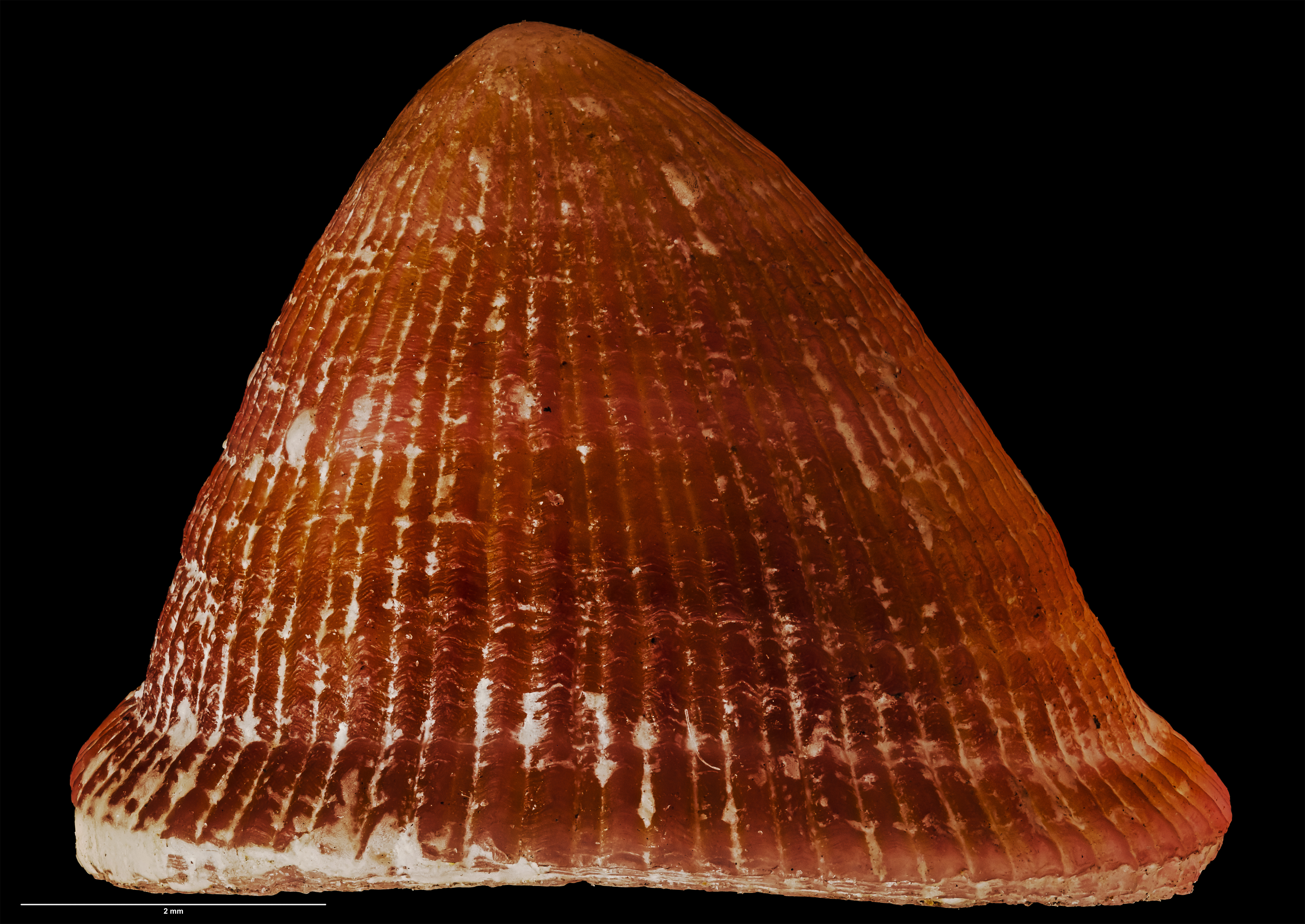
- Actinoleuca campbelli bountyensis

Scientific classification
- Kingdom: Animalia
- Phylum: Mollusca
- Class: Gastropoda
- Subclass: Patellogastropoda
- Superfamily: Lottioidea
- Family: Lottiidae
- Genus: Actinoleuca; Oliver, 1926

Species
- See text.

= Actinoleuca =

Genus of sea snails

Actinoleuca is a genus of sea snails or true limpets, marine gastropod molluscs in the family Lottiidae.

This is a southern genus and a cold-water genus.

== Species ==
Species within this genus include:

- Actinoleuca campbelli campbelli (Filhol, 1880)
- Actinoleuca campbelli bountyensis Powell, 1955
- Actinoleuca campbelli macquariensis (Hedley, 1916)
