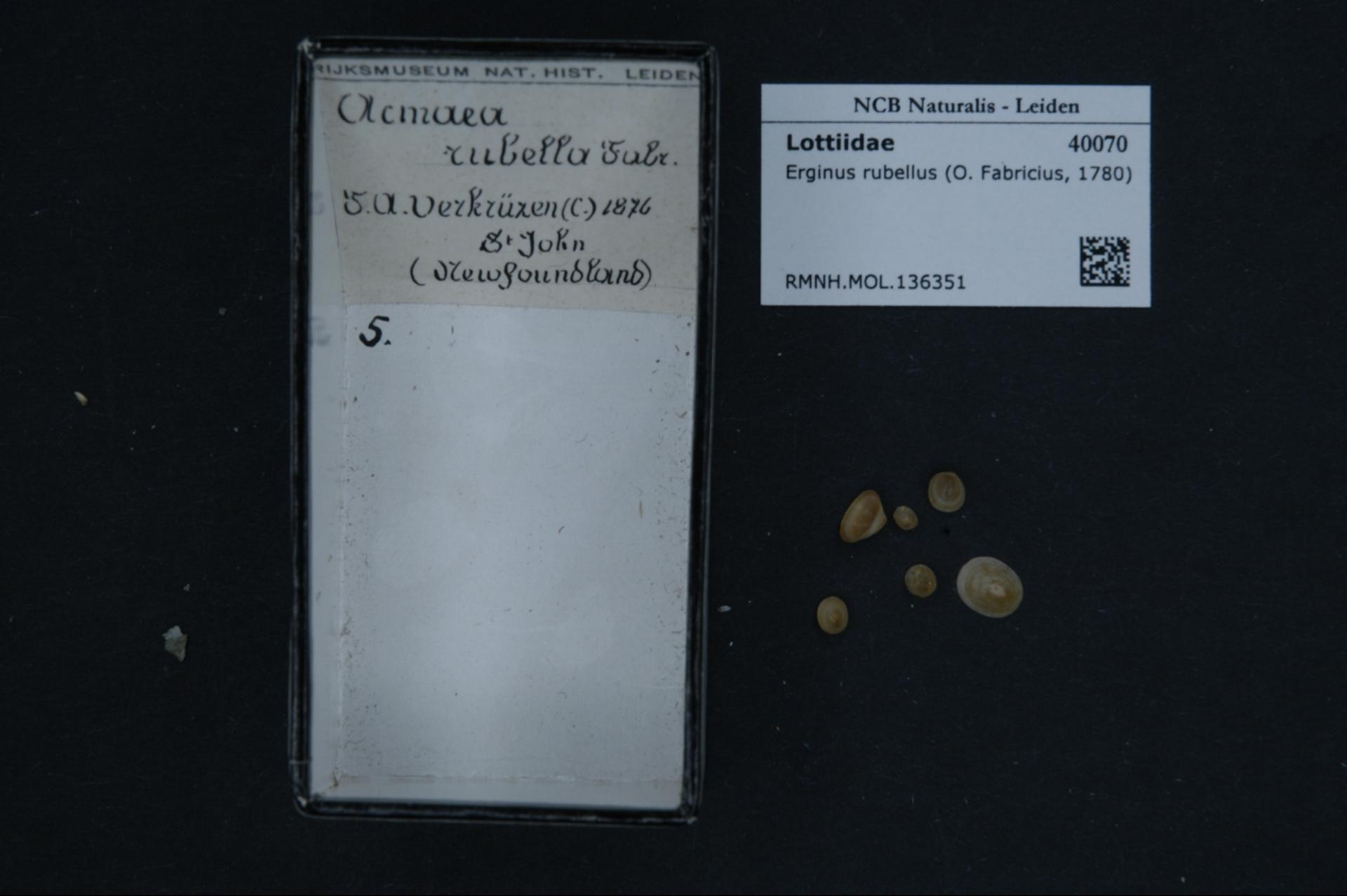

Scientific classification
- Kingdom: Animalia
- Phylum: Mollusca
- Class: Gastropoda
- Subclass: Patellogastropoda
- Family: Erginidae
- Genus: Erginus
- Species: E. rubellus

Binomial name
- Erginus rubellus (O. Fabricius, 1780)

Synonyms
- Acmaea rubella; Patella rubella O. Fabricius, 1780 (original combination); Problacmaea rubella (O. Fabricius, 1780)

= Erginus rubellus =

Species of gastropod

Erginus rubellus is a species of sea snail, a true limpet, a marine gastropod mollusk in the family Erginidae, one of the families of true limpets.

== Distribution ==
- West Greenland and East Greenland
- Canada: Queen Elizabeth Islands, Baffin Island, Labrador, Newfoundland, Nova Scotia
- Iceland

== Ecology ==
Habitat of Erginus rubellus include infralittoral and circalittoral of the Gulf and estuary.
