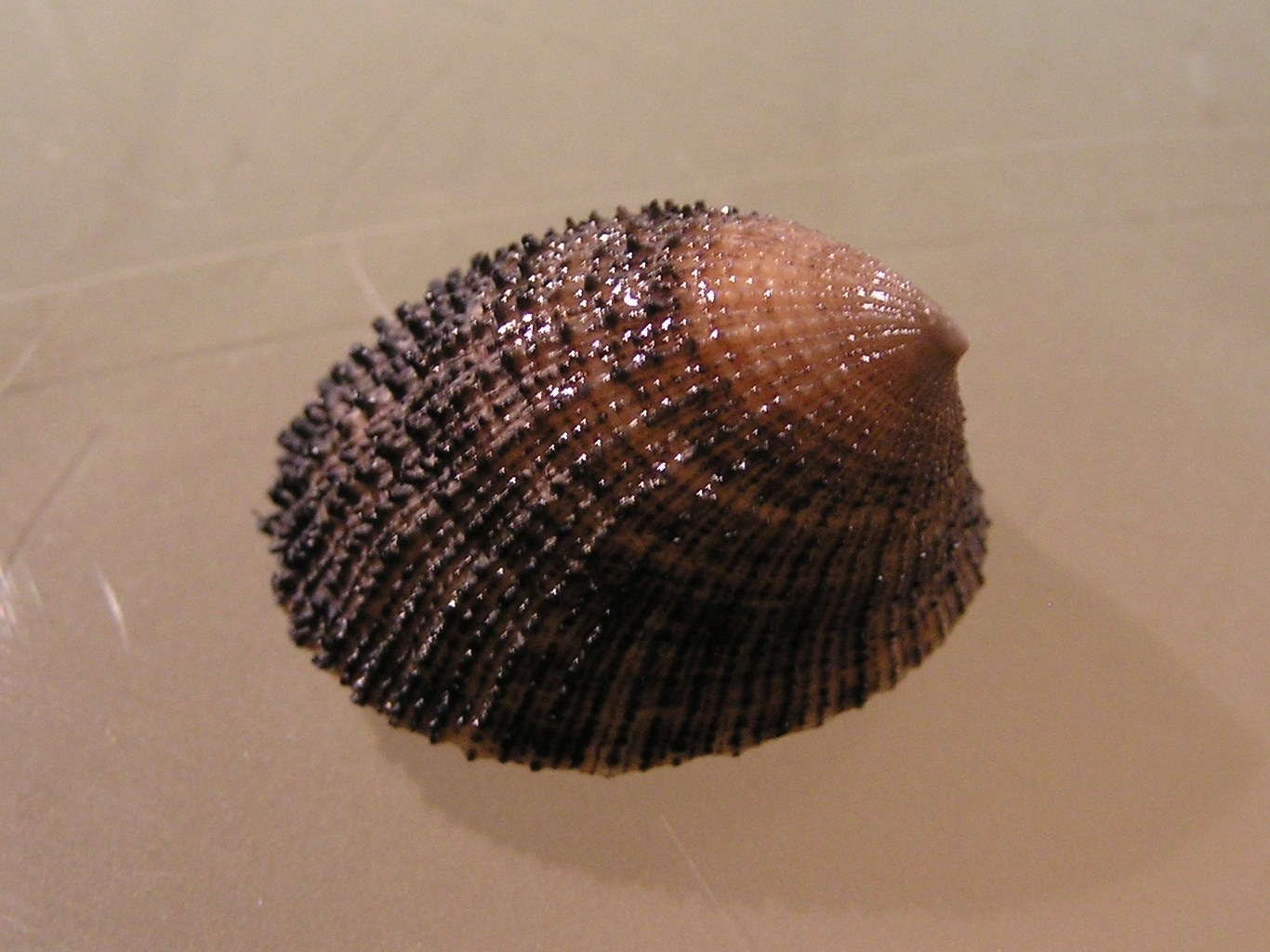
- Helcion pectunculus shell

Scientific classification
- Kingdom: Animalia
- Phylum: Mollusca
- Class: Gastropoda
- Subclass: Patellogastropoda
- Family: Patellidae
- Genus: Helcion; Montfort, 1810

= Helcion =

Genus of gastropods

Helcion is a genus of sea snails, true limpets, marine gastropod mollusks in the family Patellidae.

== Species ==
Species within the genus Helcion include:

Subgenus Ansates : accepted as Ansates G.B. Sowerby II [ex Klein], 1839

- Helcion pellucidum - Blue-rayed limpet : accepted as Ansates pellucida (Linnaeus, 1758)
- Helcion tella

Subgenus Helcion

- Helcion pectunculus (Gmelin, 1791)

Subgenus Patinastra

- Helcion dunkeri (Krauss, 1848)
- Helcion pruinosus (Krauss, 1848)

subgenus ?

- Helcion concolor (Krauss, 1848)
