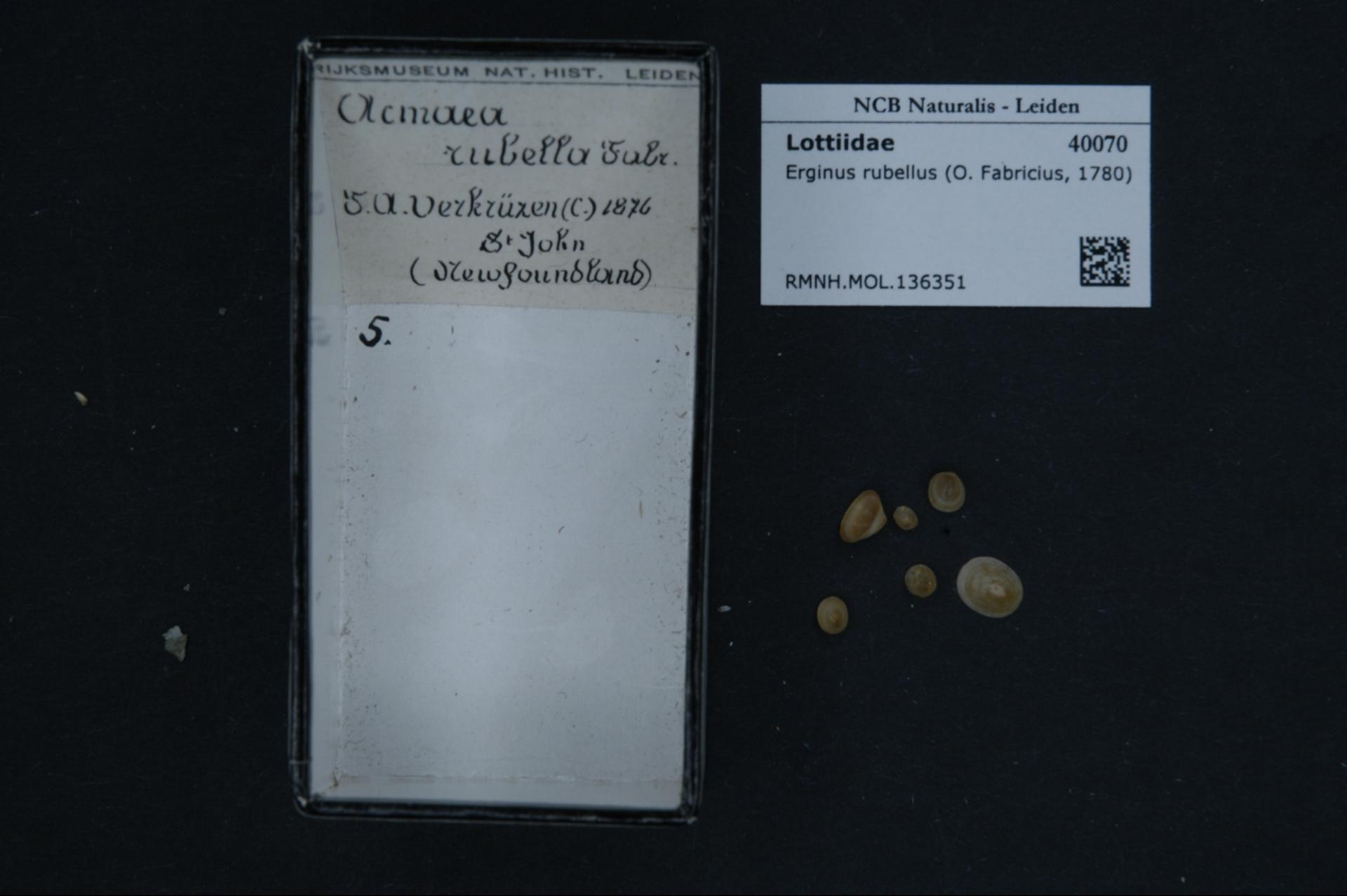
- Erginus rubellus

Scientific classification
- Kingdom: Animalia
- Phylum: Mollusca
- Class: Gastropoda
- Subclass: Patellogastropoda
- Family: Erginidae
- Genus: Erginus; Jeffreys, 1877

Type species
- Patella rubella O. Fabricius, 1780

= Erginus (gastropod) =

Genus of gastropods

Erginus is a genus of sea snails, true limpets, marine gastropod mollusks in the family Erginidae.

== Species ==
Species within the genus Erginus include:

- Erginus galkini Chernyshev & Chernova, 2002
- Erginus rubellus (Fabricius O., 1780)

Species brought into synonymy

- Erginus apicinus (Dall, 1879): synonym of Problacmaea apicina (Dall, 1879)
- Erginus moskalevi (Golikov & Kussakin, 1972): synonym of Problacmaea moskalevi Golikov & Kussakin, 1972
- Erginus puniceus Lindberg, 1988: synonym of Erginus sybariticus (Dall, 1871): synonym of Erginus sybariticus (Dall, 1871): synonym of Problacmaea sybaritica (Dall, 1871)
- Erginus sybariticus (Dall, 1871): synonym of Problacmaea sybaritica (Dall, 1871)
