= Pectinodonta marinovichi =

Scientific classification
- Kingdom: Animalia
- Phylum: Mollusca
- Class: Gastropoda
- Subclass: Patellogastropoda
- Family: Pectinodontidae
- Genus: Pectinodonta
- Species: P. marinovichi

Binomial name
- Pectinodonta marinovichi Marshall, 1998

Species of gastropod

Pectinodonta marinovichi is a species of sea snail, a true limpet, a marine gastropod mollusc in the family Pectinodontidae, one of the families of true limpets.
