= Pectinodonta rhyssa =

Scientific classification
- Kingdom: Animalia
- Phylum: Mollusca
- Class: Gastropoda
- Subclass: Patellogastropoda
- Family: Pectinodontidae
- Genus: Pectinodonta
- Species: P. rhyssa

Binomial name
- Pectinodonta rhyssa (Dall, 1925)

Species of gastropod

Pectinodonta rhyssa is a species of sea snail, a true limpet, a marine gastropod mollusc in the family Pectinodontidae, one of the families of true limpets.
