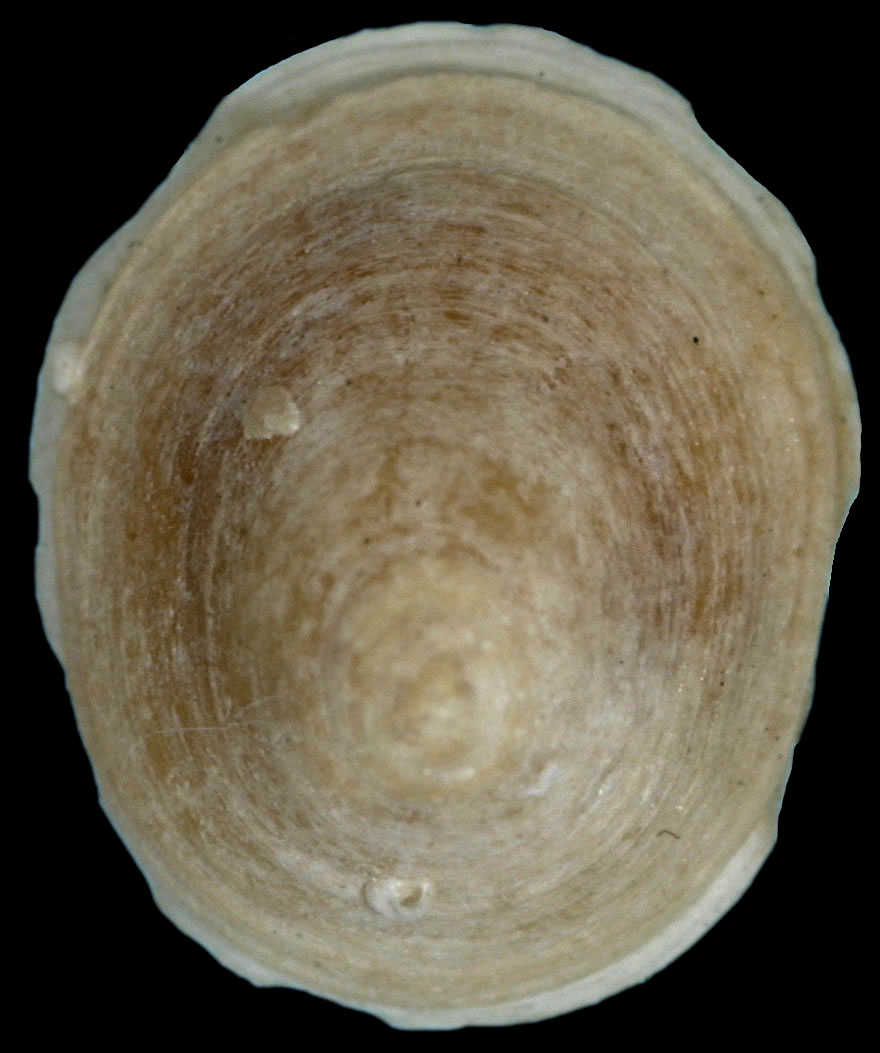

Scientific classification
- Kingdom: Animalia
- Phylum: Mollusca
- Class: Gastropoda
- Subclass: Patellogastropoda
- Family: Erginidae
- Genus: Erginus
- Species: E. galkini

Binomial name
- Erginus galkini Chernyshev & Chernova, 2002

= Erginus galkini =

Species of gastropod

Erginus galkini is a species of sea snail, a true limpet, a marine gastropod mollusk in the family Erginidae, one of the families of true limpets.
