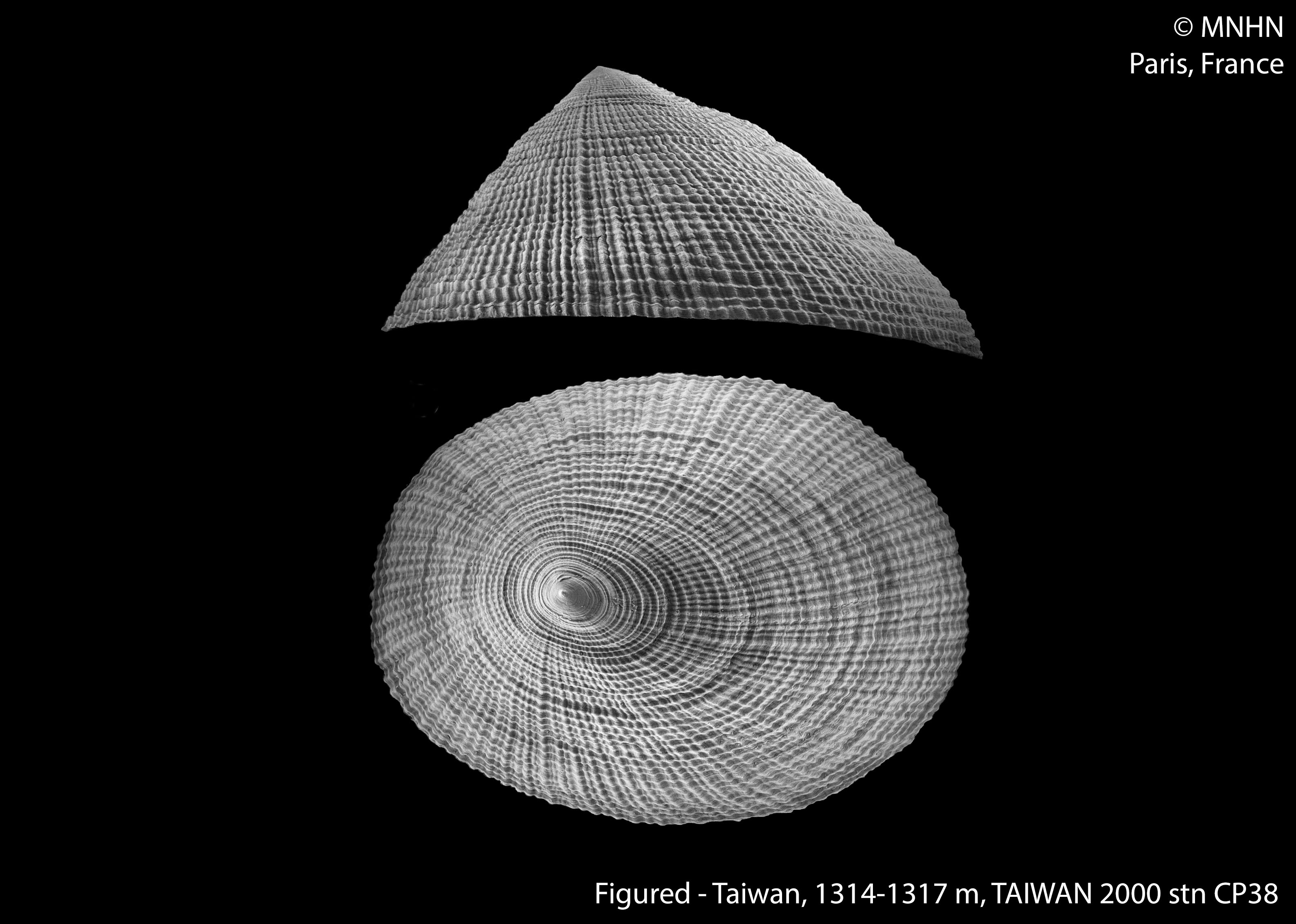
- Pectinodonta orientalis

Scientific classification
- Kingdom: Animalia
- Phylum: Mollusca
- Class: Gastropoda
- Subclass: Patellogastropoda
- Superfamily: Lottioidea
- Family: Pectinodontidae
- Genus: Pectinodonta; Dall, 1882

Type species
- Pectinodonta arcuata Dall, 1882 (type by monotypy)

= Pectinodonta =

Genus of gastropods

Pectinodonta is a genus of sea snails, the true limpets, marine gastropod mollusks in the family Pectinodontidae.

== Species ==
Species within the genus Pectinodonta include:

- Pectinodonta alis B. A. Marshall, Puillandre, Lambourdière, Couloux & Samadi, 2016
- Pectinodonta alpha B. A. Marshall, Puillandre, Lambourdière, Couloux & Samadi, 2016
- Pectinodonta alta Schepman, 1908
- Pectinodonta arcuata Dall, 1882
- Pectinodonta aupouria B. A. Marshall, 1985
- Pectinodonta aurora B. A. Marshall, Puillandre, Lambourdière, Couloux & Samadi, 2016
- Pectinodonta beta B. A. Marshall, Puillandre, Lambourdière, Couloux & Samadi, 2016
- Pectinodonta borealis Kaim, Hryniewic, C. Little & Nakrem, 2017 †
- † Pectinodonta coniformis (Marwick, 1931)
- Pectinodonta gamma B. A. Marshall, Puillandre, Lambourdière, Couloux & Samadi, 2016
- Pectinodonta gilbertvossi Olsson, 1971
- † Pectinodonta kapalae B. A. Marshall, 1985
- Pectinodonta komitica B. A. Marshall, 1985
- Pectinodonta marinovichi Marshall, 1998
- Pectinodonta maxima (Dautzenberg, 1925)
- Pectinodonta mazuae S.-Q. Zhang & S.-P. Zhang, 2018
- Pectinodonta morioria B. A. Marshall, 1985
- Pectinodonta obtusa (Thiele, 1925)
- Pectinodonta orientalis Schepman, 1908
- † Pectinodonta palaeoxylodia Lindberg & Hedegaard, 1996
- Pectinodonta philippinarum B. A. Marshall, Puillandre, Lambourdière, Couloux & Samadi, 2016
- Pectinodonta rhyssa (Dall, 1925)
- † Pectinodonta waitemata B. A. Marshall, 1985
