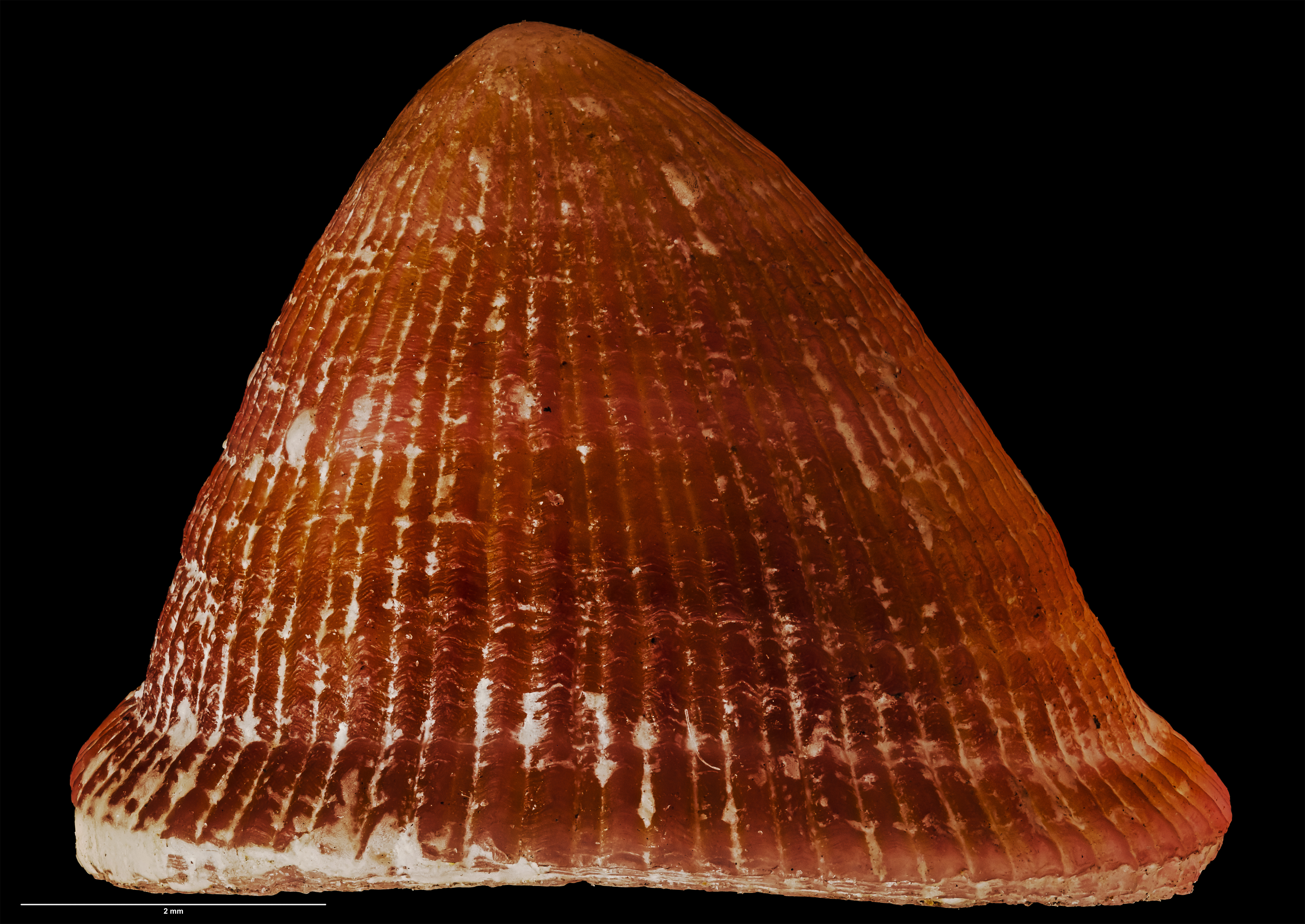
- Holotype from the Auckland War Memorial Museum

Scientific classification
- Kingdom: Animalia
- Phylum: Mollusca
- Class: Gastropoda
- Subclass: Patellogastropoda
- Family: Lottiidae
- Genus: Actinoleuca
- Species: A. campbelli
- Subspecies: A. c. bountyensis

Trinomial name
- Actinoleuca campbelli bountyensis Powell, 1955

= Actinoleuca campbelli bountyensis =

Species of gastropod

Actinoleuca campbelli bountyensis is a subspecies of sea snail or true limpet, a marine gastropod mollusc in the family Lottiidae.
