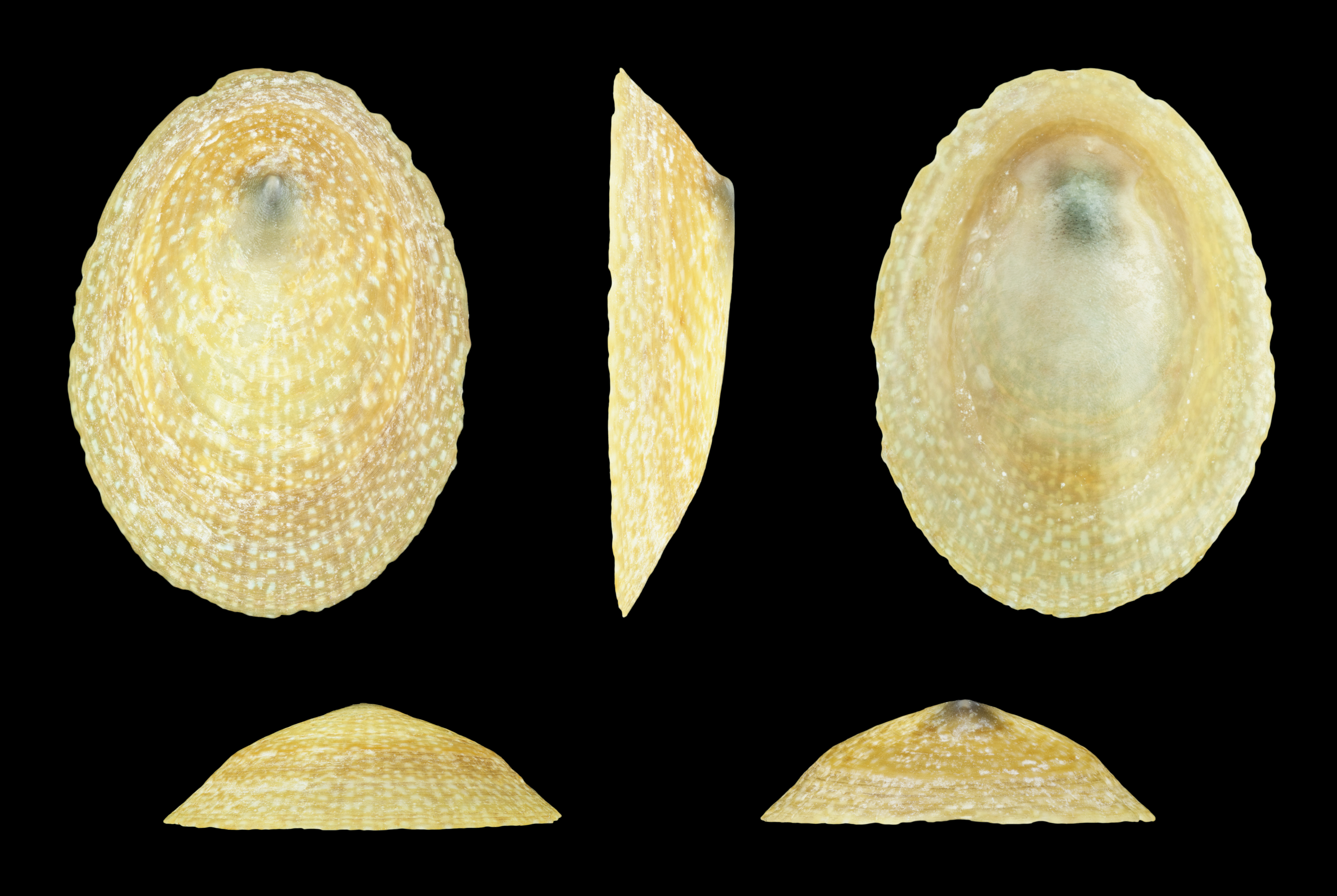

Scientific classification
- Kingdom: Animalia
- Phylum: Mollusca
- Class: Gastropoda
- Subclass: Patellogastropoda
- Family: Patellidae
- Genus: Helcion
- Species: H. pruinosus

Binomial name
- Helcion pruinosus (Krauss, 1848)

= Helcion pruinosus =

Species of gastropod

Helcion pruinosus, common name the rayed limpet, is a species of sea snail, a true limpet, a marine gastropod mollusk in the family Patellidae, one of the families of true limpets.

== Description ==
Helcion pruinosus is a marine gastropod mollusk that grazes on algae on larger rocks in intertidal areas.

== Distribution ==
Southeast Atlantic, specifically along the coastal waters of South Africa.
