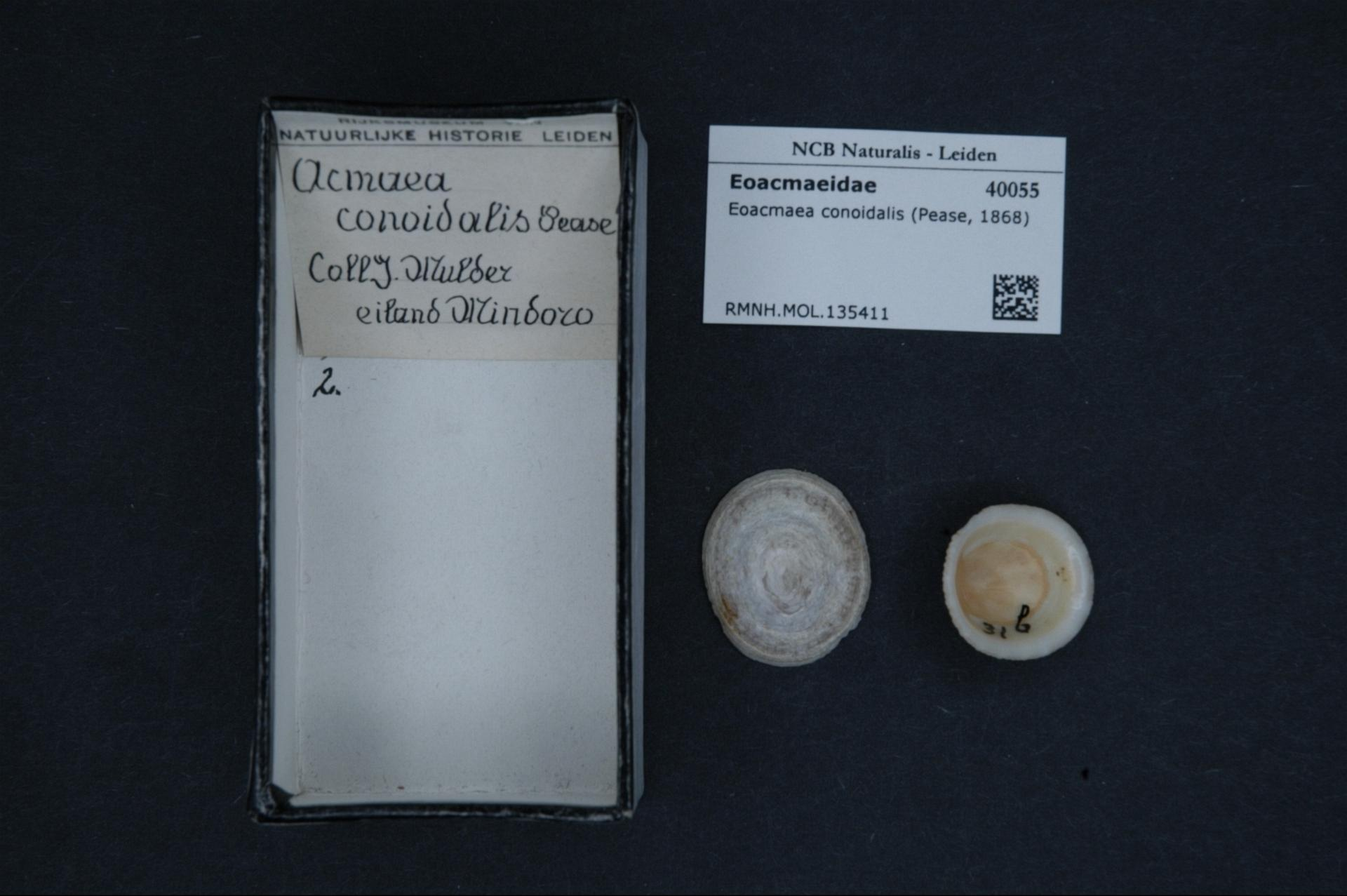
- Eoacmaea conoidalis shell

Scientific classification
- Kingdom: Animalia
- Phylum: Mollusca
- Class: Gastropoda
- Subclass: Patellogastropoda
- Family: Eoacmaeidae
- Genus: Eoacmaea
- Species: E. conoidalis

Binomial name
- Eoacmaea conoidalis (Pease, 1868)

= Eoacmaea conoidalis =

Species of gastropod

Eoacmaea conoidalis is a species of sea snail, a true limpet, a marine gastropod mollusk in the family Eoacmaeidae, one of the families of true limpets.
