= Eoacmaea semirubida =

Scientific classification
- Kingdom: Animalia
- Phylum: Mollusca
- Class: Gastropoda
- Subclass: Patellogastropoda
- Family: Eoacmaeidae
- Genus: Eoacmaea
- Species: E. semirubida

Binomial name
- Eoacmaea semirubida (Dall, 1914)

Synonyms
- Acmaea semirubida Dall, 1914

Species of gastropod

Eoacmaea semirubida is a species of sea snail, a true limpet, a marine gastropod mollusk in the family Eoacmaeidae, one of the families of true limpets.
