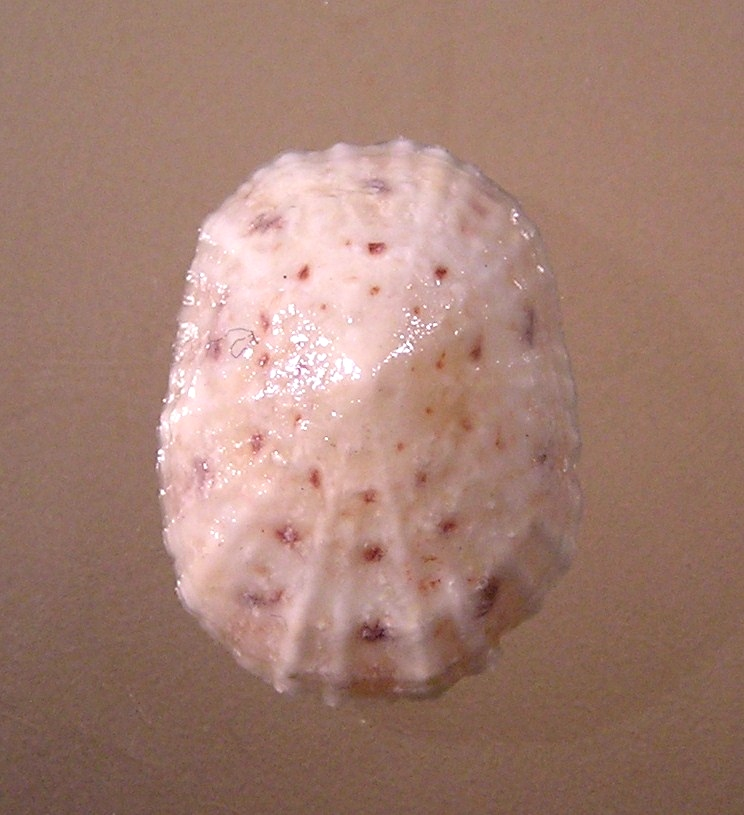
- top view of a shell of Eoacmaea pustulata

Scientific classification
- Kingdom: Animalia
- Phylum: Mollusca
- Class: Gastropoda
- Subclass: Patellogastropoda
- Family: Eoacmaeidae
- Genus: Eoacmaea
- Species: E. pustulata

Binomial name
- Eoacmaea pustulata (Helbling, 1779)

Synonyms
- Acmaea puncturata (Lamarck, 1819); Acmaea pustulata (Helbling, 1779); Patella puncturata Lamarck, 1819; Patella pustulata Helbling, 1779 (original combination); Patelloida pustulata (Helbling, 1779)

= Eoacmaea pustulata =

Species of gastropod

Eoacmaea pustulata is a species of sea snail, a true limpet, a marine gastropod mollusk in the family Eoacmaeidae, one of the families of true limpets.

== Distribution ==
This species occurs in the Caribbean Sea and in the Gulf of Mexico.
