= Bathyacmaea nipponica =

Bathyacmaea nipponica Temporal range:

Scientific classification
- Kingdom: Animalia
- Phylum: Mollusca
- Class: Gastropoda
- Subclass: Patellogastropoda
- Family: Pectinodontidae
- Genus: Bathyacmaea
- Species: B. nipponica

Binomial name
- Bathyacmaea nipponica Okutani, Fujikura & Sasaki, 1992

Synonyms
- Bathyacmaea austrina S.-Q. Zhang & S.-P. Zhang, 2020 junior subjective synonym; Bathyacmaea brevidentata S.-Q. Zhang & S.-P. Zhang, 2020 junior subjective synonym; bathyacmaea secunda Okutani, Fujikura & Sasaki, 1993; Bathyacmaea tertia Sasaki, Okutani & Fujikura, 2003 d; Serradonta vestimentifericola Okutani, Tsuchida & Fujikura, 1992

Species of gastropod

Bathyacmaea nipponica is a species of very small (adults are typically about 6 mm in length), deep-sea limpet, a marine gastropod mollusk in the family Pectinodontidae.

This species inhabits the dark, chemosynthesis-based marine communities of ocean vents and cold seeps near Japan (e.g. the Okinawa Trough).

It is distinct from other true limpets in the following ways, among others: its intestine runs through its ventricle, it has a pair of radular "teeth" with long shafts, and its statocysts are isolated from the pleural ganglia and pedal ganglia. It also has a ctenidium rather than the usual set of circumpallial gills, lacks osphradia, and does not have even rudimentary eyes.

For these reasons, along with a comparison of the development of the shell at the microscopic level, it has been argued that B. nipponica is not closely related to the Patelloidea or the Neolepetopsidae as one might expect based on simple morphological characteristics and similarity of appearance. This species has a surprising number of traits in common with the Acmaeidae, however, suggesting a possible close connection with that family rather than the other true limpet families.

== Anatomy ==

=== Circulatory system ===
The principal circulatory organ is the animal's heart which is located within a pericardial sack on the animal's left side near its head. The heart consists of a single (morphologically left) auricle, a single large and muscular ventricle, and the muscular but much smaller bulbous aorta below it which joins the posterior and anterior aortae. The posterior aorta opens into the visceral sinus, delivering blood to the gonad and digestive gland; the anterior aorta sends blood forward into the buccal mass. The ctenidium contains blood spaces and receives oxygen. B. secunda does not have a series of arteries and veins— like all gastropods and indeed all molluscs, its blood is retained within various open body cavities or "sinuses" collectively referred to as a hemocoel.

=== Nervous system ===
Like most molluscs, B. nipponica has a circumesophageal nerve ring or nerve collar composed of its pleural and pedal ganglia and their commissures and connectives within the region of the head. The esophagus passes through this nerve ring on its way back to the stomach; the esophageal pouches and salivary glands are located entirely before it. The cerebral ganglia are also located forward of the ring. Behind the nerve ring, the commissure of the pleural ganglia performs a characteristic "twist" common to many gastropods, the evolutionary result of torsion which placed the anus and the openings of the kidneys ("nephridial openings") near the head of the animal in order to accommodate the ancestral presence of a twisted shell (B. secunda does not have such a shell, but the streptoneurous condition of the pleural commissure remains).

==== Pedal and pleural ganglia ====
The pedal ganglia are located low and close together in the back of the head region, with the more widely spaced pleural ganglia positioned slightly forward of them and above. Each pedal ganglion gives off a broad pedal nerve cord that runs the length of the animal's body beneath the visceral mass and together control its foot and shell muscle bundles. Each of the pleural ganglia connects to a statocyst that allows the limpet to orient itself. The pleural ganglia also innervate the pericardium (via the pericardial nerve cord) and the visceral ganglion, as well as the anterior and posterior sets of pallial nerves which travel through the mantle and surround the animal's head and sides respectively.

==== Cerebral ganglia ====
The cerebral ganglia, the largest within the animal's body, connect to the labial ganglia and buccal ganglia, thereby controlling the muscles of the mouth. They also innervate the two cephalic tentacles and the snout, governing motion of the head and its sensory organs. The cerebral ganglia are not located near the pleural and pedal ones, an arrangement called hypoathroid which is considered evolutionarily archaic: more "modern" molluscs tend to have the cerebral, pleural, and pedal ganglia situated centrally and more proximally to each other.

=== Reproduction ===
B. nipponica is gonochoristic, and all animals are either male or female. The reproductive system of both males and females consists only of a single large disk-shaped gonad organ located above the animal's foot and extending around the lower posterior part of the visceral mass. When the gonad is ripe, the reproductive cells— sperm or eggs— burst from the organ and are released through a single gonoduct directly into the surrounding water. Reproduction requires no physical contact between sexes, and neither sex has any specialized sex organ other than the gonad itself. Offspring do not receive any parental care.
