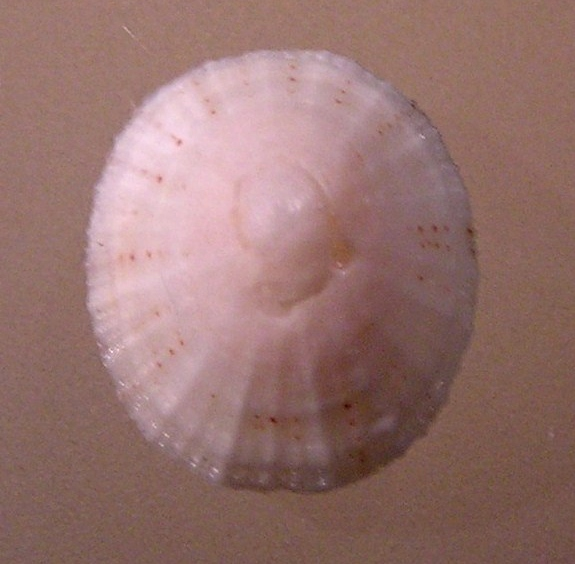
- Eoacmaea profunda shell

Scientific classification
- Kingdom: Animalia
- Phylum: Mollusca
- Class: Gastropoda
- Subclass: Patellogastropoda
- Family: Eoacmaeidae
- Genus: Eoacmaea
- Species: E. profunda

Binomial name
- Eoacmaea profunda (Deshayes, 1863)

Synonyms
- Acmaea profunda (Deshayes); Helcioniscus profundus Deshayes, 1863 (original combination); Hemitoma profunda (Deshayes, 1863); Patella profunda Deshayes, 1863; Patelloida profunda (Deshayes, 1863); Patelloida profunda albonotata (E. A. Smith, 1910); Patelloida profunda profunda (Deshayes, 1863)

= Eoacmaea profunda =

Species of gastropod

Eoacmaea profunda is a species of sea snail, a true limpet, a marine gastropod mollusk in the family Eoacmaeidae, one of the families of true limpets.

Eoacmaea profunda is the type species in the genus Eoacmaea.

== Description ==
The size of the shell attains 9.8 mm.

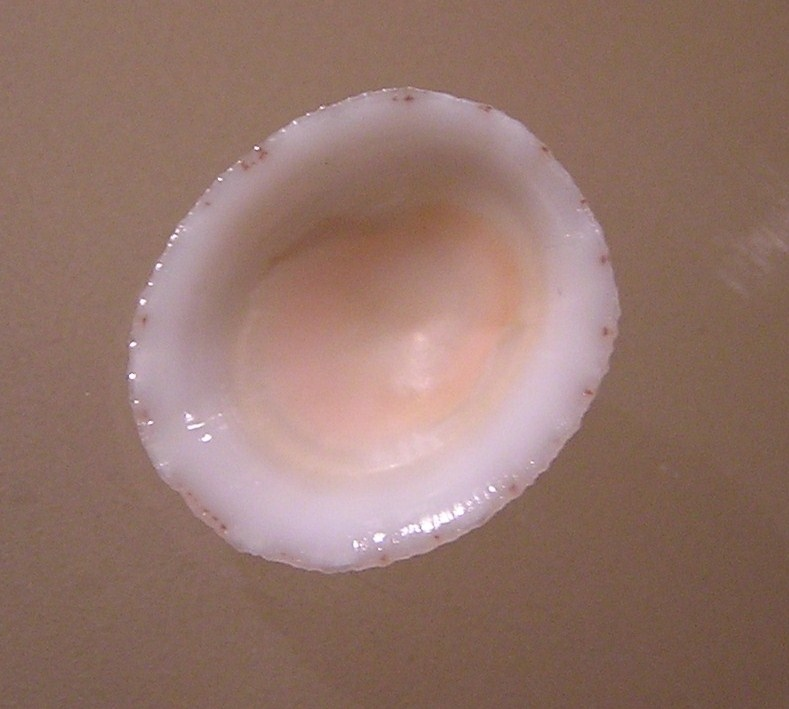
basal view

== Distribution ==
This species occurs in the Indian Ocean off Madagascar, Aldabra, the Mascarene Basin and Kenya.
