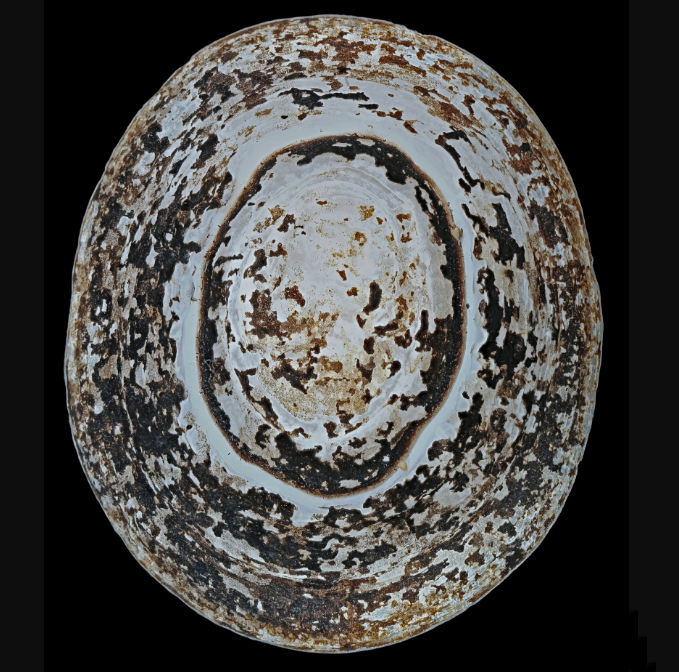
- Shell of Bathyacmaea nadinae (holotype at MNHN, Paris)

Scientific classification
- Kingdom: Animalia
- Phylum: Mollusca
- Class: Gastropoda
- Subclass: Patellogastropoda
- Family: Pectinodontidae
- Genus: Bathyacmaea; Okutani, Tsuchida & Fujikura, 1992

Type species
- Bathyacmaea nipponica Okutani, Tsuchida & Fujikura, 1992

= Bathyacmaea =

Bathyacmaea Temporal range:

Genus of gastropods

Bathyacmaea is a genus of deep-sea limpet, marine gastropod mollusk in the family Pectinodontidae. Species in this genus inhabit the dark, chemosynthesis-based marine communities of ocean vents and cold seeps near Japan.

== Species ==
Species within the genus Bathyacmaea include:

- Bathyacmaea becki S.-Q. Zhang & S.-P. Zhang, 2017
- Bathyacmaea jonassoni Beck, 1996
- Bathyacmaea kanesunosensis (Sasaki, Okutani & Fujikura, 2003)
- † Bathyacmaea kimberleyae (Saether, C. Little, B. A. Marshall & K. C. Campbell, 2012)
- Bathyacmaea lactea S. Q. Zhang, J. L. Zhang & S. P. Zhang, 2016
- Bathyacmaea nadinae L. Beck, 2023
- Bathyacmaea nipponica Okutani, Tsuchida & Fujikura, 1992
- Bathyacmaea subnipponica Sasaki, Okutani & Fujikura, 2003

Synonyms

- Bathyacmaea austrina S.-Q. Zhang & S.-P. Zhang, 2020 synonym of Bathyacmaea nipponica Okutani, Tsuchida & Fujikura, 1992 (junior subjective synonym)
- Bathyacmaea brevidentata S.-Q. Zhang & S.-P. Zhang, 2020: synonym of Bathyacmaea nipponica Okutani, Tsuchida & Fujikura, 1992 (junior subjective synonym)
- Bathyacmaea secunda Okutani, Fujikura & Sasaki, 1993: synonym of Bathyacmaea nipponica Okutani, Tsuchida & Fujikura, 1992
- Bathyacmaea tertia Sasaki, Okutani & Fujikura, 2003: synonym of Bathyacmaea nipponica Okutani, Tsuchida & Fujikura, 1992
