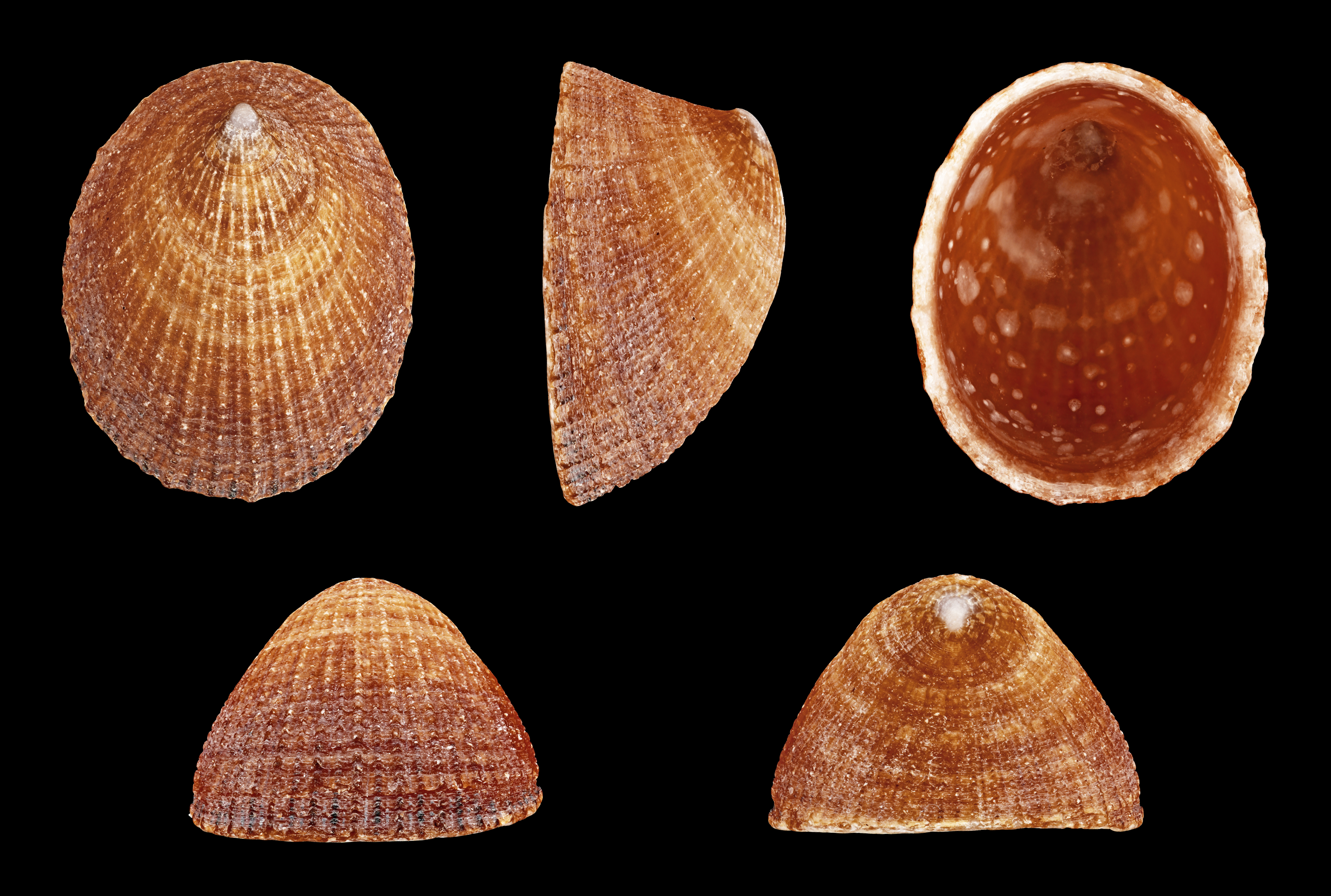
- Five views of a shell of Helcion pectunculus (Gmelin, 1791)

Scientific classification
- Kingdom: Animalia
- Phylum: Mollusca
- Class: Gastropoda
- Subclass: Patellogastropoda
- Family: Patellidae
- Genus: Helcion
- Species: H. pectunculus

Binomial name
- Helcion pectunculus (Gmelin, 1791)

= Helcion pectunculus =

Species of gastropod

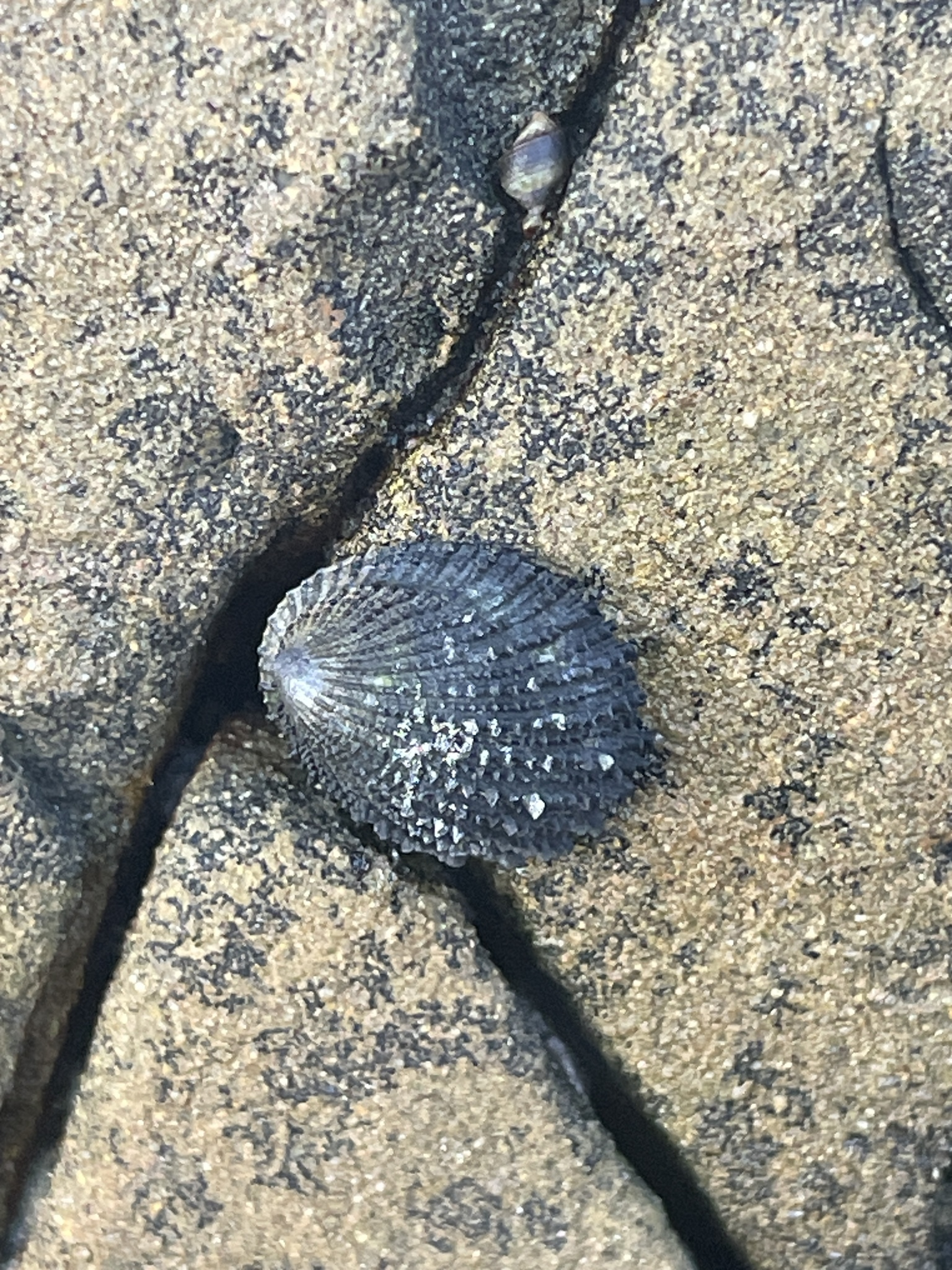
Helcion Petunculus, a marine shelled invertebrate

Helcion pectunculus, common name the prickly limpet, is a species of sea snail, a true limpet, a marine gastropod mollusk in the family Patellidae, one of the families of true limpets.

== Distribution ==
Its mostly present around southern coast of africa. Its a marine species.
