= Actinoleuca campbelli macquariensis =

Scientific classification
- Kingdom: Animalia
- Phylum: Mollusca
- Class: Gastropoda
- Subclass: Patellogastropoda
- Family: Lottiidae
- Genus: Actinoleuca
- Species: A. campbelli
- Subspecies: A. c. macquariensis

Trinomial name
- Actinoleuca campbelli macquariensis (Hedley, 1916)

Synonyms
- Radiacmea macquariensis Hedley, 1916

Species of gastropod

Actinoleuca campbelli macquariensis is a subspecies of sea snail or true limpet, a marine gastropod mollusc in the family Lottiidae, one family of true limpets.
