= Eoacmaea albonotata =

Scientific classification
- Kingdom: Animalia
- Phylum: Mollusca
- Class: Gastropoda
- Subclass: Patellogastropoda
- Family: Eoacmaeidae
- Genus: Eoacmaea
- Species: E. albonotata

Binomial name
- Eoacmaea albonotata (Smith, 1901)

Synonyms
- Acmaea albonotata; Patelloida profunda albonotata

Species of gastropod

Eoacmaea albonotata is a species of sea snail, a true limpet, a marine gastropod mollusk in the family Eoacmaeidae, one of the families of true limpets. The species is found off Natal, South Africa.
