= Eoacmaea javanica =

Scientific classification
- Kingdom: Animalia
- Phylum: Mollusca
- Class: Gastropoda
- Subclass: Patellogastropoda
- Family: Eoacmaeidae
- Genus: Eoacmaea
- Species: E. javanica

Binomial name
- Eoacmaea javanica (Nakano, Aswan & Ozawa, 2005)

Species of gastropod

Eoacmaea javanica is a species of sea snail, a true limpet, a marine gastropod mollusk in the family Eoacmaeidae, one of the families of true limpets.
