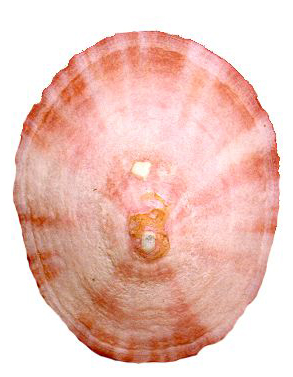
- Shell of Problacmaea sybaritica

Scientific classification
- Kingdom: Animalia
- Phylum: Mollusca
- Class: Gastropoda
- Subclass: Patellogastropoda
- Family: Erginidae
- Genus: Problacmaea
- Species: P. sybaritica

Binomial name
- Problacmaea sybaritica (Dall, 1871)

Synonyms
- Collisella sybaritica Dall, 1871 (original combination); Erginus puniceus Lindberg, 1988; Erginus sybariticus (Dall, 1871)

= Problacmaea sybaritica =

Species of gastropod

Problacmaea sybaritica is a species of sea snail, a true limpet, a marine gastropod mollusc in the family Erginidae, one of the families of true limpets.

== Distribution ==
This marine species occurs in the Bering Sea.
