= Eoacmaea ceylanica =

Scientific classification
- Kingdom: Animalia
- Phylum: Mollusca
- Class: Gastropoda
- Subclass: Patellogastropoda
- Family: Eoacmaeidae
- Genus: Eoacmaea
- Species: E. ceylanica

Binomial name
- Eoacmaea ceylanica (E.A. Smith, 1911)

Synonyms
- Acmaea bombayana var. ceylanica E.A. Smith, 1911

Species of gastropod

Eoacmaea ceylanica is a species of sea snail, a true limpet, a marine gastropod mollusk in the family Eoacmaeidae, one of the families of true limpets.
