= Eoacmaea calamus =

Scientific classification
- Kingdom: Animalia
- Phylum: Mollusca
- Class: Gastropoda
- Subclass: Patellogastropoda
- Family: Eoacmaeidae
- Genus: Eoacmaea
- Species: E. calamus

Binomial name
- Eoacmaea calamus (Crosse & Fischer, 1864)

Synonyms
- Patella calamus Crosse & Fischer, 1864

Species of gastropod

Eoacmaea calamus is a species of sea snail, a true limpet, a marine gastropod mollusk in the family Eoacmaeidae, one of the families of true limpets.
