= Eoacmaea ivani =

Scientific classification
- Kingdom: Animalia
- Phylum: Mollusca
- Class: Gastropoda
- Subclass: Patellogastropoda
- Family: Eoacmaeidae
- Genus: Eoacmaea
- Species: E. ivani

Binomial name
- Eoacmaea ivani (Christiaens, 1975)

Synonyms
- Patelloida profunda ivani Christiaens, 1975

Species of gastropod

Eoacmaea ivani is a species of sea snail, a true limpet, a marine gastropod mollusk in the family Eoacmaeidae, one of the families of true limpets.
