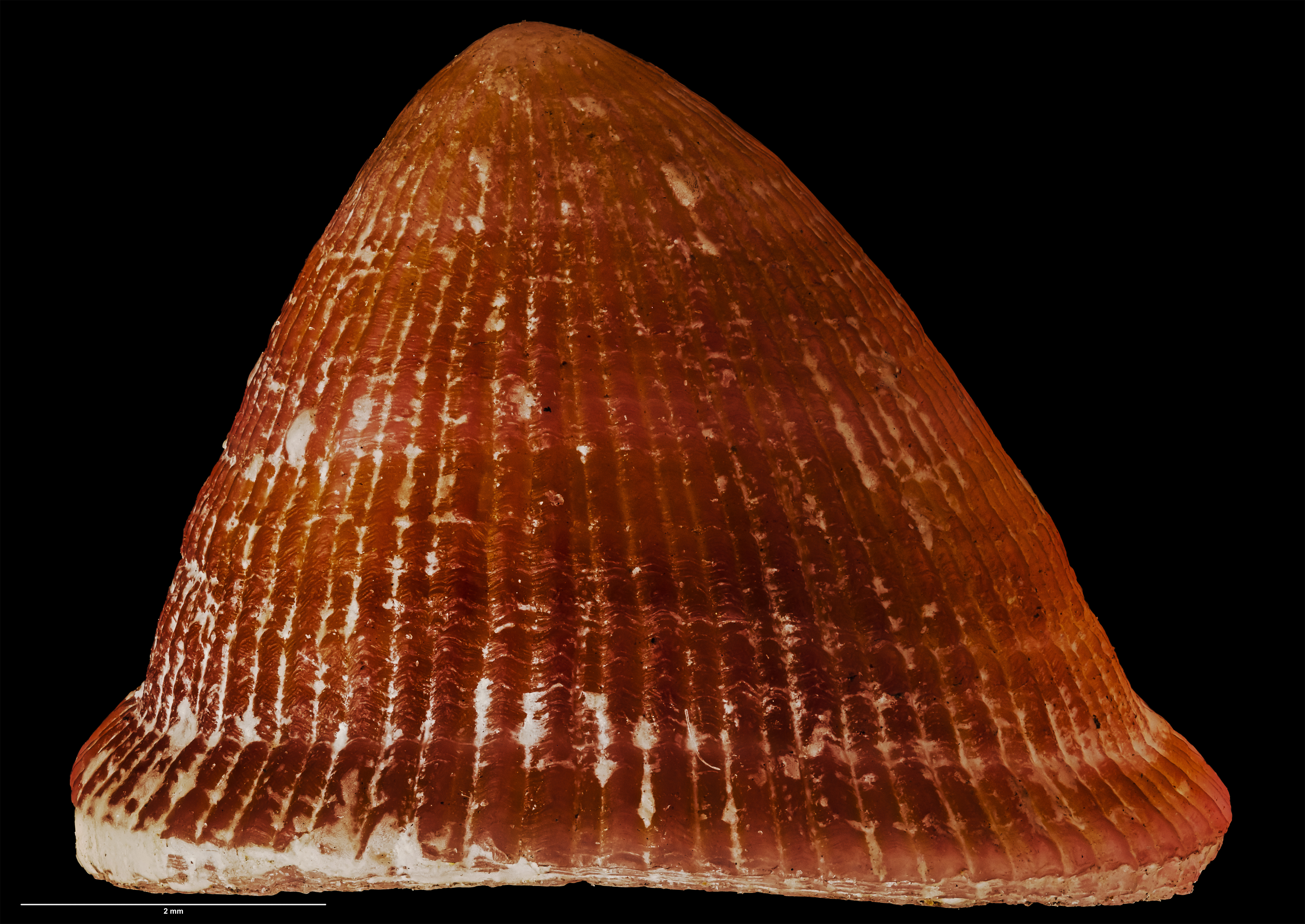
- Actinoleuca campbelli bountyensis

Scientific classification
- Kingdom: Animalia
- Phylum: Mollusca
- Class: Gastropoda
- Subclass: Patellogastropoda
- Family: Lottiidae
- Genus: Actinoleuca
- Species: A. campbelli

Binomial name
- Actinoleuca campbelli (Filhol, 1880)

Synonyms
- Patella campbelli Filhol, 1880

= Actinoleuca campbelli =

Species of gastropod

Actinoleuca campbelli is a species of sea snail or true limpet, a marine gastropod (mollusc) in the family, Lottiidae, a family of true limpets.

== Subspecies ==
Subspecies within this species include:

- Actinoleuca campbelli bountyensis
- Actinoleuca campbelli macquariensis
