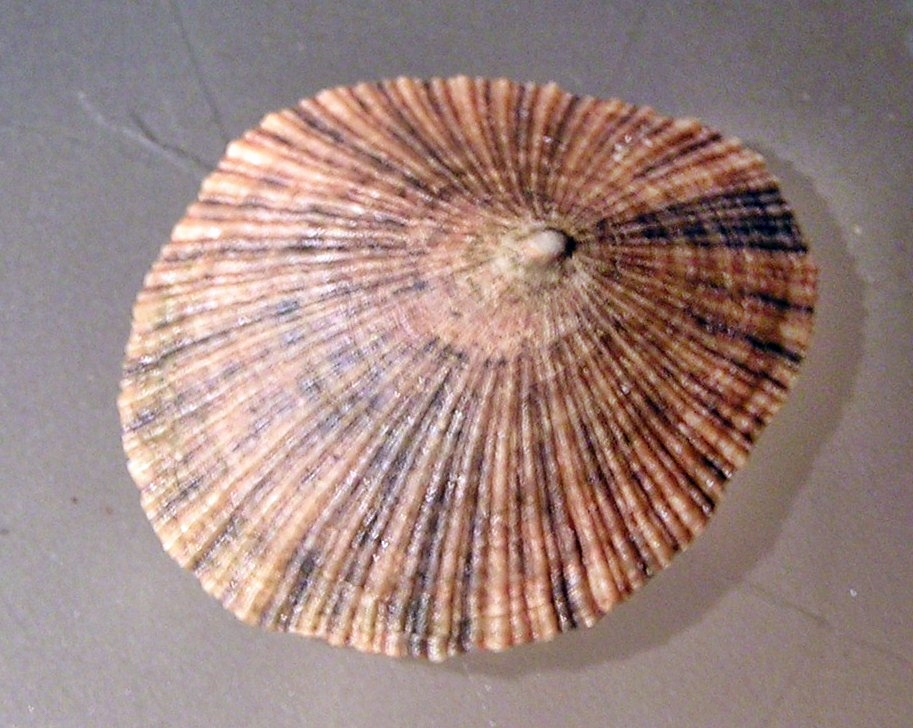
- Helcion concolor shell

Scientific classification
- Kingdom: Animalia
- Phylum: Mollusca
- Class: Gastropoda
- Subclass: Patellogastropoda
- Family: Patellidae
- Genus: Helcion
- Species: H. concolor

Binomial name
- Helcion concolor (Krauss, 1848)

Synonyms
- Patella concolor Krauss, 1848; Patella concolor f. polygramma Tomlin, 1931; Patella farquhari Turton, 1932; Patella helena Turton, 1932; Patella rietensis Turton, 1932; Patella variabilis Krauss, 1848; Patella variabilis var. concolor Krauss, 1848; Patella variabilis var. constellata Sowerby III, 1921; Patella variabilis var. fasciata Krauss, 1848; Patella variabilis var. fasciolata Tomlin, 1931; Patella variabilis var. helvola Turton, 1932; Patella variabilis var. polygramma Tomlin, 1931; Patella variabilis var. radiata Krauss, 1848

= Helcion concolor =

Species of gastropod

Helcion concolor known by the common name variable limpet, is a species of sea snail, a marine gastropod mollusk in the family Patellidae, one of the families of true limpets.

== Taxonomy ==
The species was first described in 1848 by the German scientist Christian Ferdinand Friedrich Krauss (as Patella concolor).

== Distribution ==
H. concolor occurs in the Indian Ocean off of Mozambique and South Africa, where the water typically ranges between 20-25 °C (68-77 °F)

== Description ==
H. concolor typically ranges between 30 mm and 60 mm. Coloration varies widely; individual shells may be white, yellow, russet, or black and may feature spots or rays of various widths. Coloration does not appear to vary with distribution or zonation. The cusps of the radula teeth are sharply pointed.

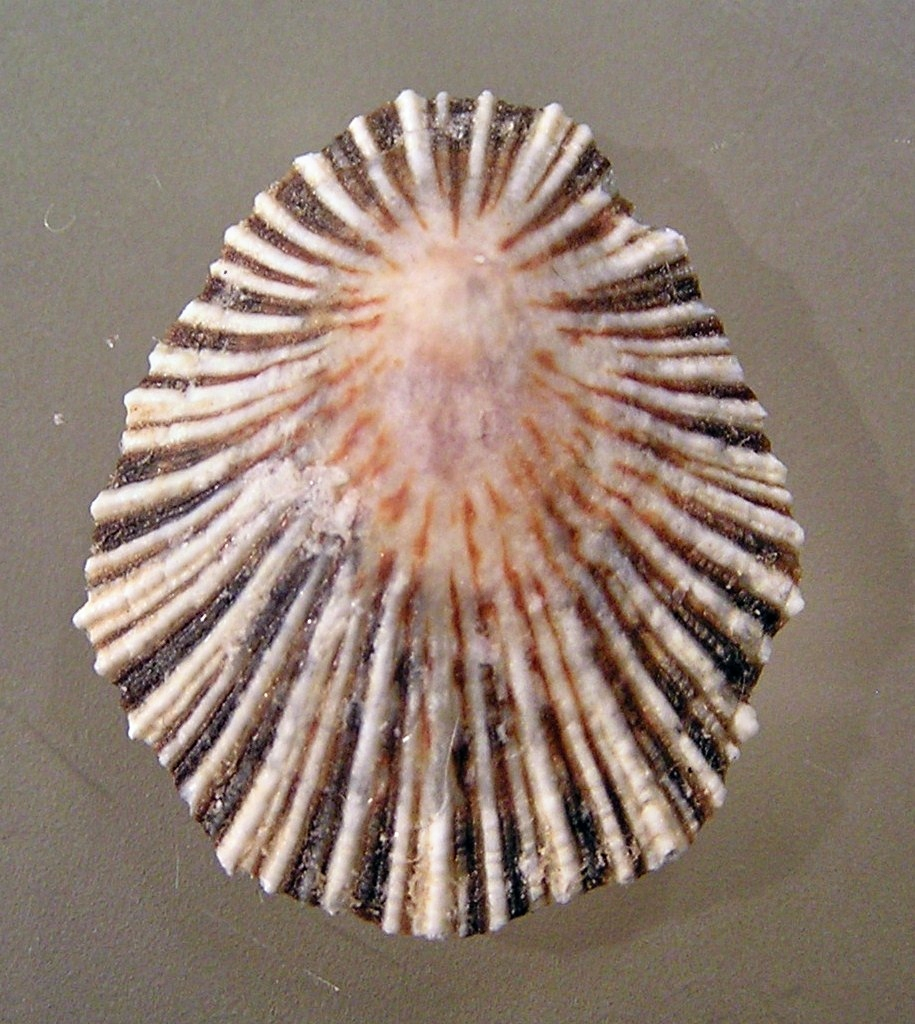
Dorsal view.

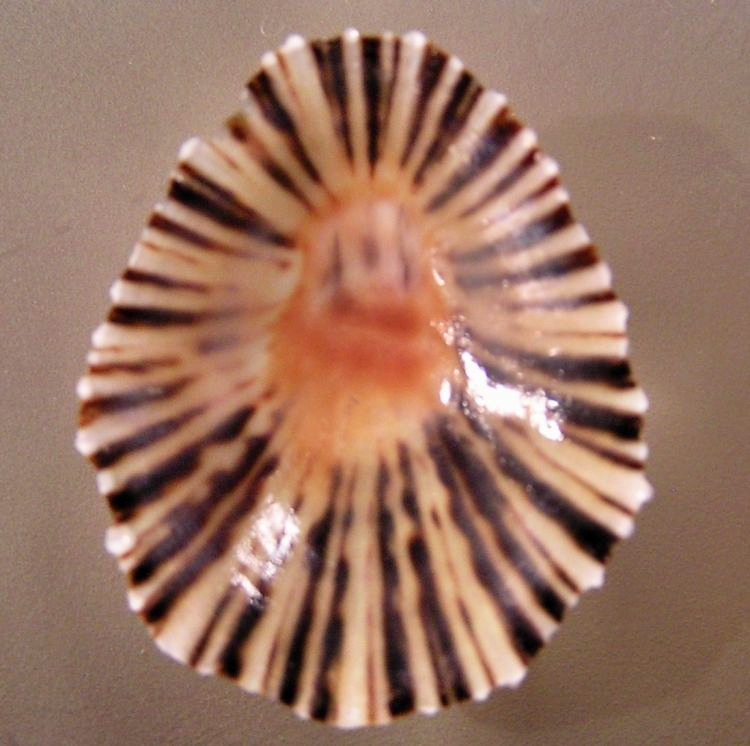
Ventral view.

== Behavior and Ecology ==
In a 1975 paper, South African cnidariologist George Branch noted a tendency for larger individuals to migrate further upshore and space out further than their smaller counterparts. Larger individuals (over 35mm) were noted to return to a "home scar" after feeding with the majority of studied specimens remaining in or returning to the same scar over a 10-day observation period. Smaller individuals (under 20mm) did not have a fixed scar but tended to return to a general area when not feeding.

H. concolor is a non-territorial broswer. An examination of the gut contents of fifty individuals of the species noted that most had consumed large quantities of sand along with smaller quantities of diatoms, sponge spicules, algae fragments, lichens, and detritus.

== Relationship with humans ==
H. concolor is one of a number of limpet species commonly eaten by humans. In his 1975 paper, Branch noted that the mollusc featured in the diets of indigenous people of southeastern South Africa, particularly in instances of drought and crop failure when other food became scarce. He recounts that H. concolor (then called Patella concolor) and Cellana capensis were favored "because they yield a reasonable quantity of meat and the flesh is easily removed. The entire animal is eaten, after removal of the radula from larger specimens." Branch noted that both species were at particular risk of being harvested as their tendency to reside in the balanoid zone made them easily accessible. He recorded a decrease in both size and number of some populations which he attributed to human predation.
