= Damilinidae =

Scientific classification
- Kingdom: Animalia
- Phylum: Mollusca
- Class: Gastropoda
- Subclass: Patellogastropoda
- Superfamily: Lottioidea
- Family: †Damilinidae; Horný, 1961

Extinct family of gastropods

Daminilidae is an extinct family of fossil sea snails, true limpets, marine gastropod mollusks in the clade Patellogastropoda. This family has no subfamilies.

== Taxonomy ==
Daminilidae belongs to superfamily Neolepetopsoidea according to the taxonomy of the Gastropoda by Bouchet & Rocroi, 2005).

Neolepetopsoidea was synonymized with Lottioidea so Daminilidae was moved to superfamily Lottioidea in World Register of Marine Species.
