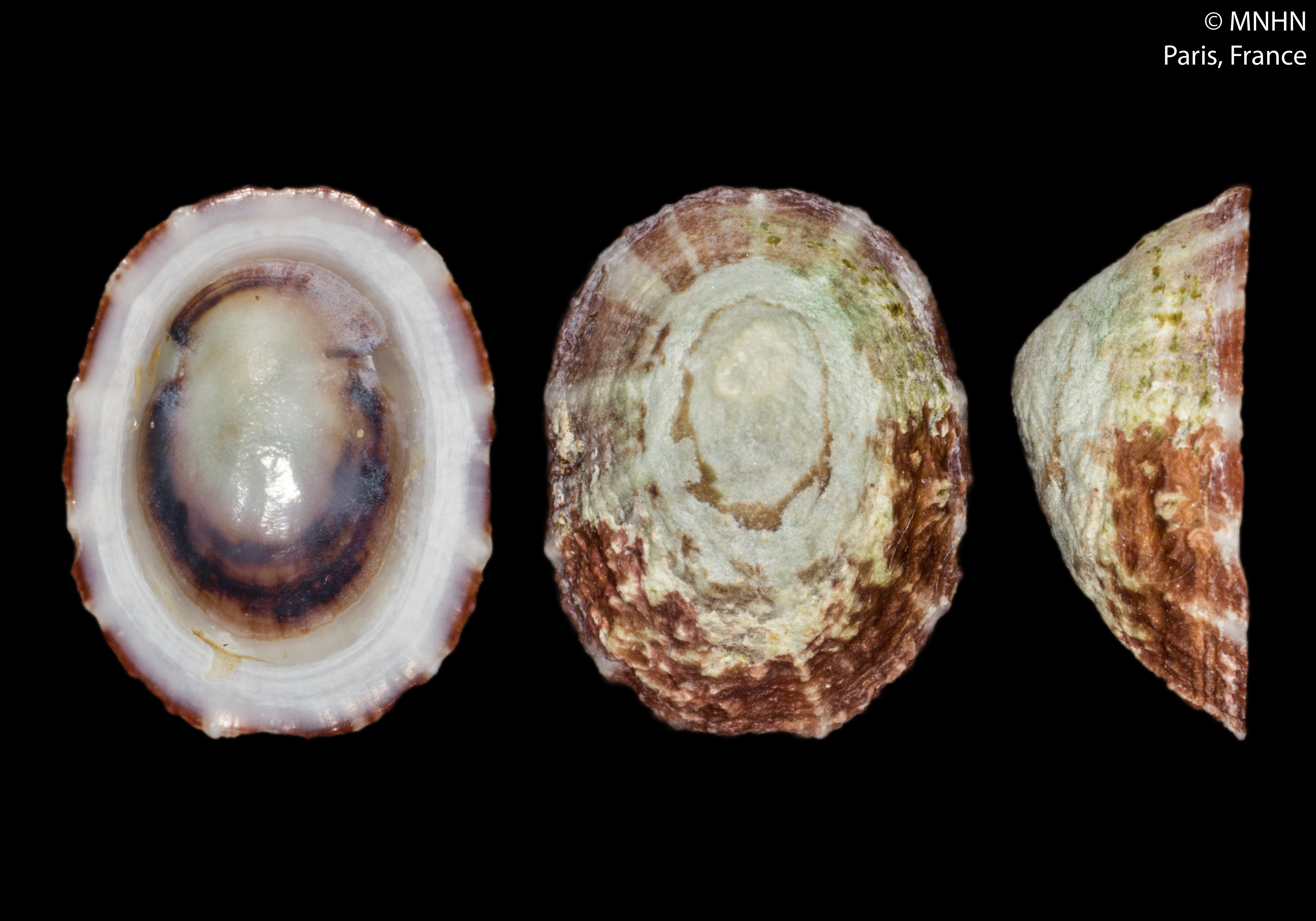
- Shell of Eoacmaea profunda (syntype at MNHN, Paris)

Scientific classification
- Kingdom: Animalia
- Phylum: Mollusca
- Class: Gastropoda
- Subclass: Patellogastropoda
- Superfamily: Lottioidea
- Family: Eoacmaeidae
- Genus: Eoacmaea; Nakano & Ozawa, 2007

Type species
- Patella profunda Deshayes, 1863

= Eoacmaea =

Genus of gastropods

Eoacmaea is a genus of sea snails or true limpets, marine gastropod mollusks in the subclass Patellogastropoda, the true limpets.

Eoacmaea is the only genus in the family Eoacmaeidae, belonging to the superfamily Lottioidea.

== Etymology ==
The generic name Eoacmaea is composed from the Eo that mean "early" in Greek and Acmaea, that is the genus of gastropod in family Lottiidae.

== Taxonomy ==
The family Eoacmaeidae was established by Nakano & Ozawa (2007) for the genus Eoacmaea.

A cladogram based on sequences of mitochondrial 12S ribosomal RNA, 16S ribosomal RNA and cytochrome-c oxidase I (COI) genes showing phylogenic relations of Patellogastropoda by Nakano & Ozawa (2007) and superfamilies based on World Register of Marine Species:

- Patellogastropoda
  - - Lottioidea
      - Lottiidae (including Acmaea and Niveotectura)
      - - - Pectinodontidae
          - Lepetidae
        - Nacellidae
    - Patelloidea
      Patellidae
  - Eoacmaeoidea
    Eoacmaeidae - only one genus Eoacmaea

Eoacmaea is the most basal group within Patellogastropoda and Eoacmaea have diversified from other Patellogastropoda in Tethys Ocean in Triassic or Jurassic about 203 million years ago (limits are from 143 to 279 million years ago).

== Species ==
Species within the genus Eoacmaea include:

- Eoacmaea albonotata (Smith, 1901)
- Eoacmaea calamus (Crosse & Fischer, 1864)
- Eoacmaea ceylanica (E.A. Smith, 1911)
- Eoacmaea chamorrorum (Lindberg & Vermeij, 1985)
- Eoacmaea conoidalis (Pease, 1868)
- Eoacmaea ivani (Christiaens, 1975)
- Eoacmaea javanica (Nakano, Aswan & Ozawa, 2005)
- Eoacmaea mauritiana (Pilsbry, 1891)
- Eoacmaea omanensis (Christiaens, 1975)
- Eoacmaea perfestiva (Faber, 2004)
- Eoacmaea profunda (Deshayes, 1863) - type species
- Eoacmaea pustulata (Helbling, 1779)
- Eoacmaea semirubida (Dall, 1914)
