= Lepetopsidae =

Scientific classification
- Kingdom: Animalia
- Phylum: Mollusca
- Class: Gastropoda
- Subclass: Patellogastropoda
- Superfamily: Lottioidea
- Family: †Lepetopsidae; McLean, 1990

Extinct family of gastropods

Lepetopsidae is an extinct family of gastropods in the clade Patellogastropoda.

This family has no subfamilies.

Members of extant family Neolepetopsidae probably developed from Lepetopsidae.

== Taxonomy ==
Lepetopsidae belongs to superfamily Neolepetopsoidea according to the taxonomy of the Gastropoda by Bouchet & Rocroi, 2005).

Neolepetopsoidea was synonymized with Lottioidea so Lepetopsidae was moved to superfamily Lottioidea in World Register of Marine Species.

== Genera ==
Genera within the family Lepetopsidae include:

- Lepetopsis
  - Lepetopsis levettei White, 1882
