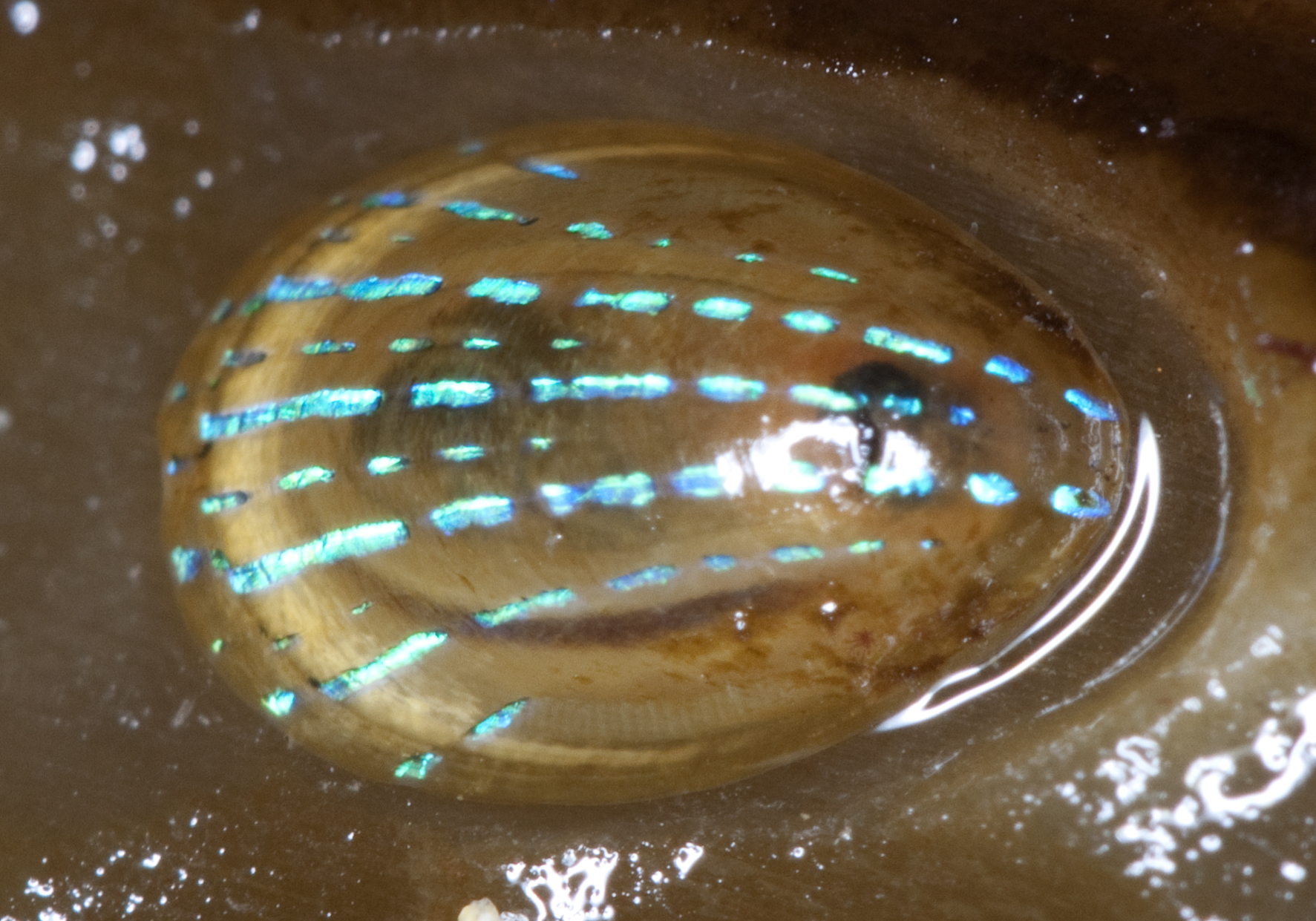

Scientific classification
- Kingdom: Animalia
- Phylum: Mollusca
- Class: Gastropoda
- Subclass: Patellogastropoda
- Family: Patellidae
- Genus: Patella
- Species: P. pellucida

Binomial name
- Patella pellucida Linnaeus, 1758

Synonyms
- Ansates pellucida (Linnaeus, 1758); Helcion gracile Locard, 1892; Helcion pellucidum (Linnaeus, 1758); Patella bimaculata Montagu, 1803; Patella coeruleata da Costa, 1778; Patella cornea Helbling, 1779; Patella cypridium Perry, 1811 (dubious synonym); Patella fusca Landt, 1800; Patella intorta Pennant, 1777; Patella laevis Pennant, 1777; Patella mytiliformis Schroeter, 1786; Patina pellucida (Linnaeus, 1758); Patina pellucida leavis Pennant, 1777; Patella pellucida var. oblonga Jeffreys, 1865

= Patella pellucida =

Species of mollusc

Patella pellucida, common name the blue-rayed limpet, is a species of small saltwater limpet, a marine gastropod mollusc in the family Patellidae, the true limpets.

== Range of distribution ==
This limpet occurs off the eastern Atlantic coasts from Iceland and Norway, to Portugal. It is absent from the Baltic Sea, East Denmark, Belgium and the Netherlands.

== Shell description ==
Up to 15 mm long when fully grown, this species is easily identified by its translucent amber shell with brilliant blue spots running in lines across the top of the shell.

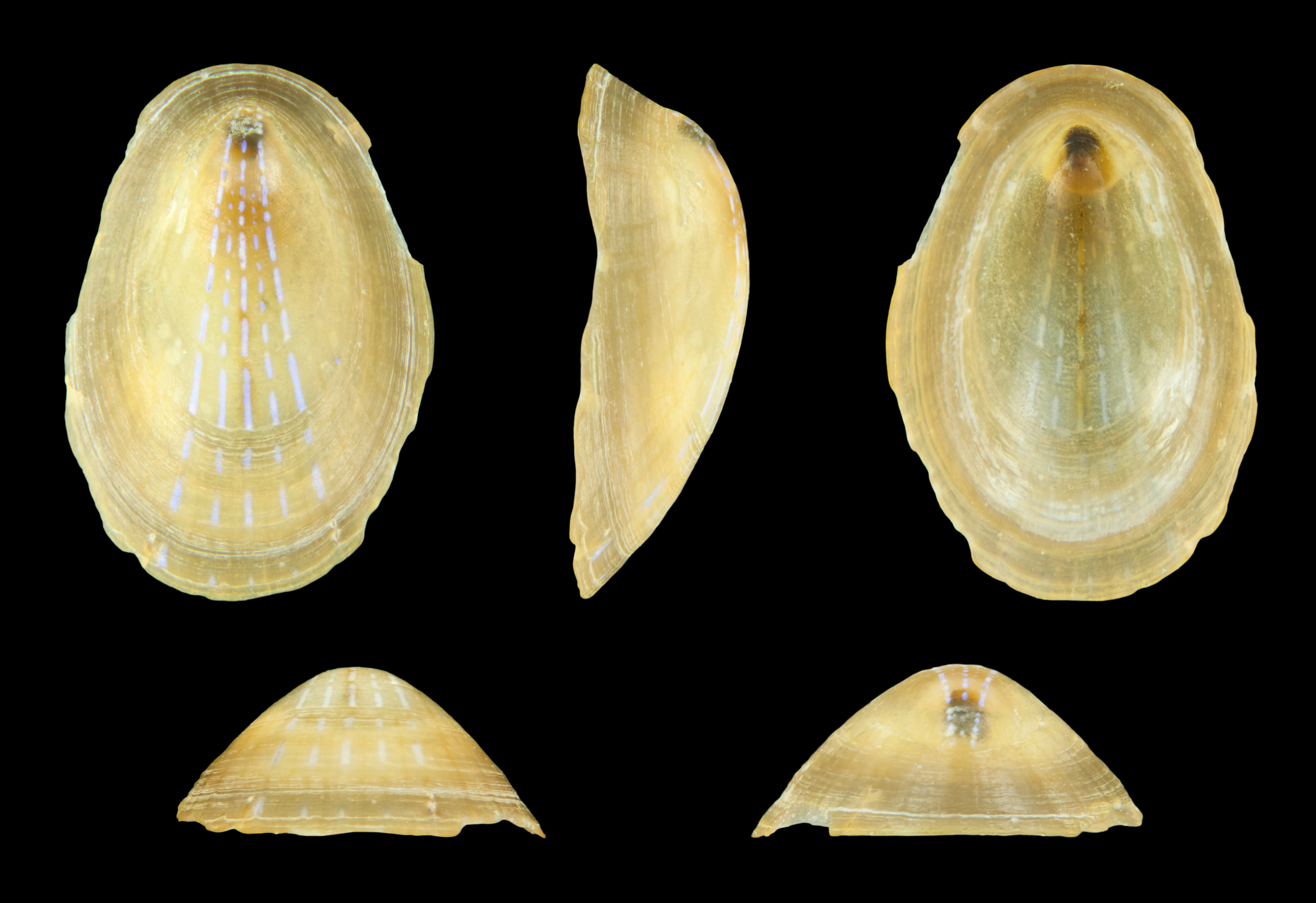
var. pellucida

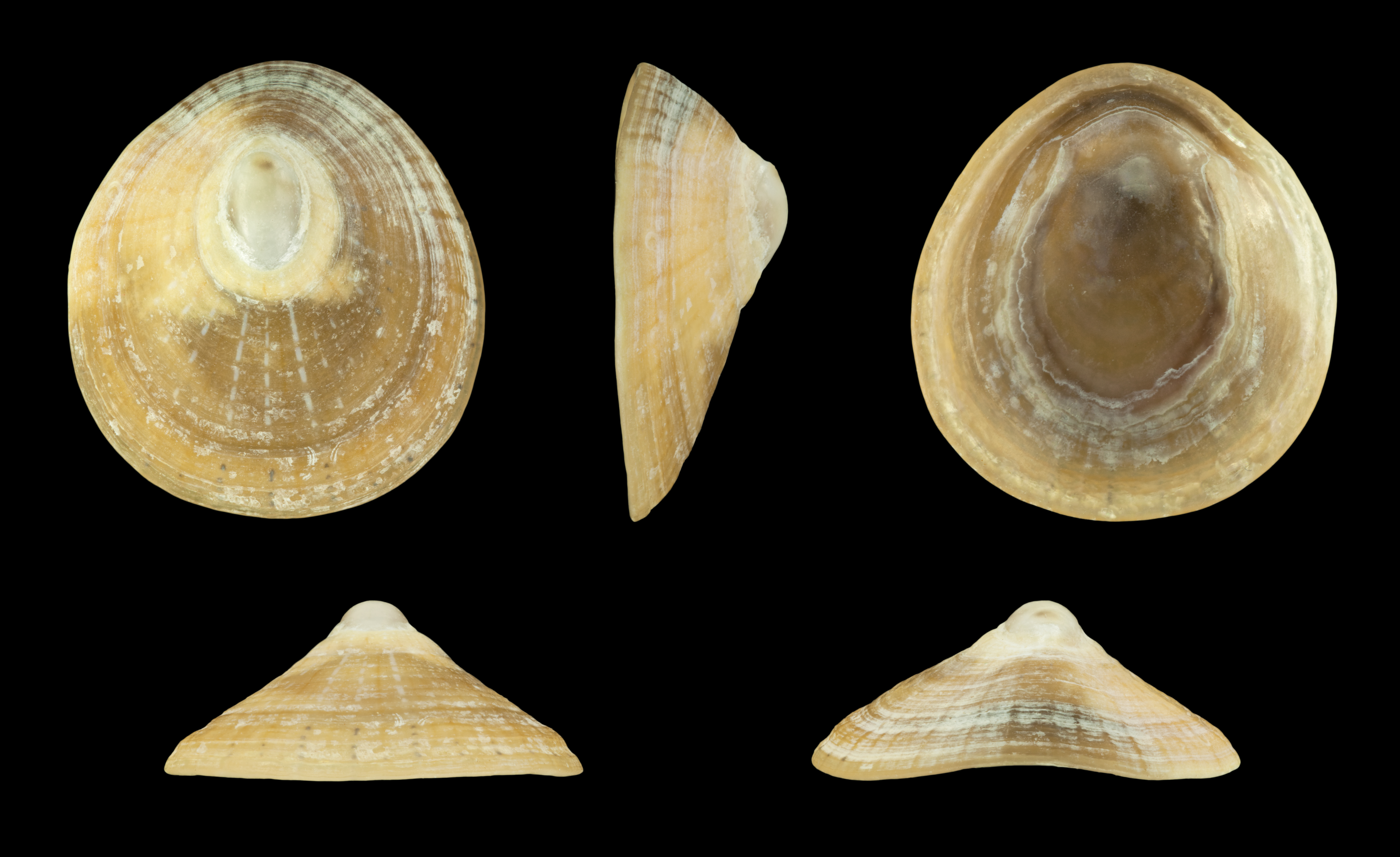
var. laevis

== Habitat ==
The blue-rayed limpet lives primarily on Laminaria (kelp) in strong flowing water but also on Fucus serratus on the lower shore, down to about 30 m.

== Life habits ==
The larvae of this limpet species settle and metamorphose on the algal frond. Here it feeds on its host’s tissue using its radula, leaving small depressions in the frond.

As the limpets grow larger, they move down the stipe of the seaweed towards the holdfast, where they establish themselves by excavating a depression. This can weaken the holdfast, eventually resulting in the seaweed being dislodged by storms. The seaweed is often washed ashore, with the blue-rayed limpets still in place.
