= Erginidae =

Scientific classification
- Kingdom: Animalia
- Phylum: Mollusca
- Class: Gastropoda
- Subclass: Patellogastropoda
- Superfamily: Lottioidea
- Family: Erginidae; Chernyshev, 2018

Type genus
- Erginus Jeffreys, 1877

Family of gastropods

Erginidae is a family of small deep sea sea snails or true limpets, marine gastropod mollusks in the subclass Patellogastropoda.

== Genera ==
- Erginus Jeffreys, 1877
- Problacmaea Golikov & Kussakin, 1972
