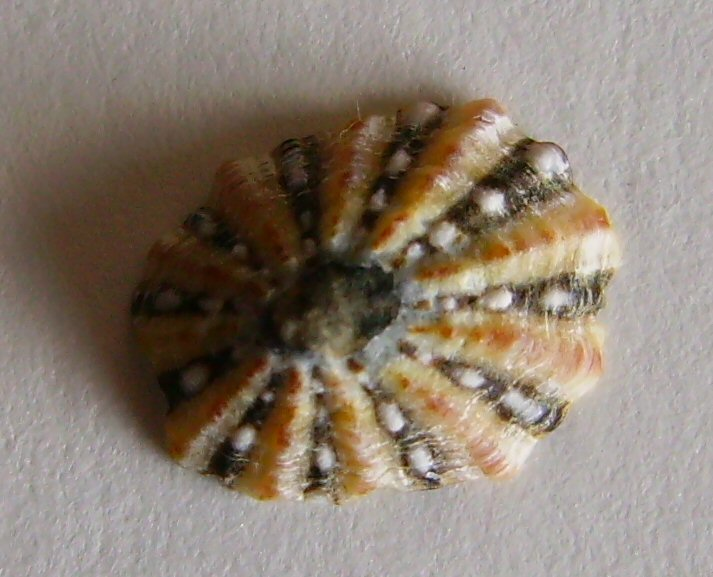
- Cellana ornata

Scientific classification
- Kingdom: Animalia
- Phylum: Mollusca
- Class: Gastropoda
- Subclass: Patellogastropoda
- Superfamily: Lottioidea; J. E. Gray, 1840

Families
- See text

Synonyms
- Nacelloidea Thiele, 1891; Neolepetopsoidea McLean, 1990

= Lottioidea =

Superfamily of gastropods

Lottioidea is a superfamily of sea snails or limpets, marine gastropod mollusks in the clade Patellogastropoda, the true limpets.

== 2005 taxonomy ==
There are three families within Lottioidea in the taxonomy of the Gastropoda by Bouchet & Rocroi (2005):

- Family Lottiidae J. E. Gray, 1840
- Family Acmaeidae E. Forbes, 1850
- Family Lepetidae J. E. Gray, 1850

== 2007 taxonomy ==
Based on molecular research on the Patellogastropoda by Nakano & Ozawa (2007) there were eight families in Lottioidea:

- family Acmaeidae Forbes, 1850
- † family Damilinidae Horný, 1961
- family Eoacmaeidae T. Nakano & Ozawa, 2007
- family Erginidae Chernyshev, 2018
- family Lepetidae Gray, 1850
- † family Lepetopsidae McLean, 1990
- family Lottiidae Gray, 1840
- family Neolepetopsidae McLean, 1990
- family Pectinodontidae Pilsbry, 1891

Families and subfamilies brought into synonymy

- Bertiniidae Jousseaume, 1883: synonym of Nacellidae Thiele, 1891
- Lottidae [sic] : synonym of Lottiidae Gray, 1840
- Propilidiidae: synonym of Lepetidae Gray, 1850
- Rhodopetalinae Linddberg, 1981: synonym of Acmaeidae Forbes, 1850 (a junior synonym)
- Tecturidae Gray, 1847 accepted as Tecturinae Gray, 1847 (original rank)

== 2017 taxonomy ==
According to the revised taxonomy of Bouchet et al (2017), the Lottioidea contains the following families:

- Family Lottiidae J. E. Gray, 1840
- Family Acmaeidae E. Forbes, 1850
- † Family Damilinidae Horný, 1961
- Family Lepetidae J. E. Gray, 1850
- † Family Lepetopsidae McLean, 1990
- Family Nacellidae Thiele, 1891
- Family Neolepetopsidae McLean, 1990
- Family Pectinodontidae Pilsbry, 1891
