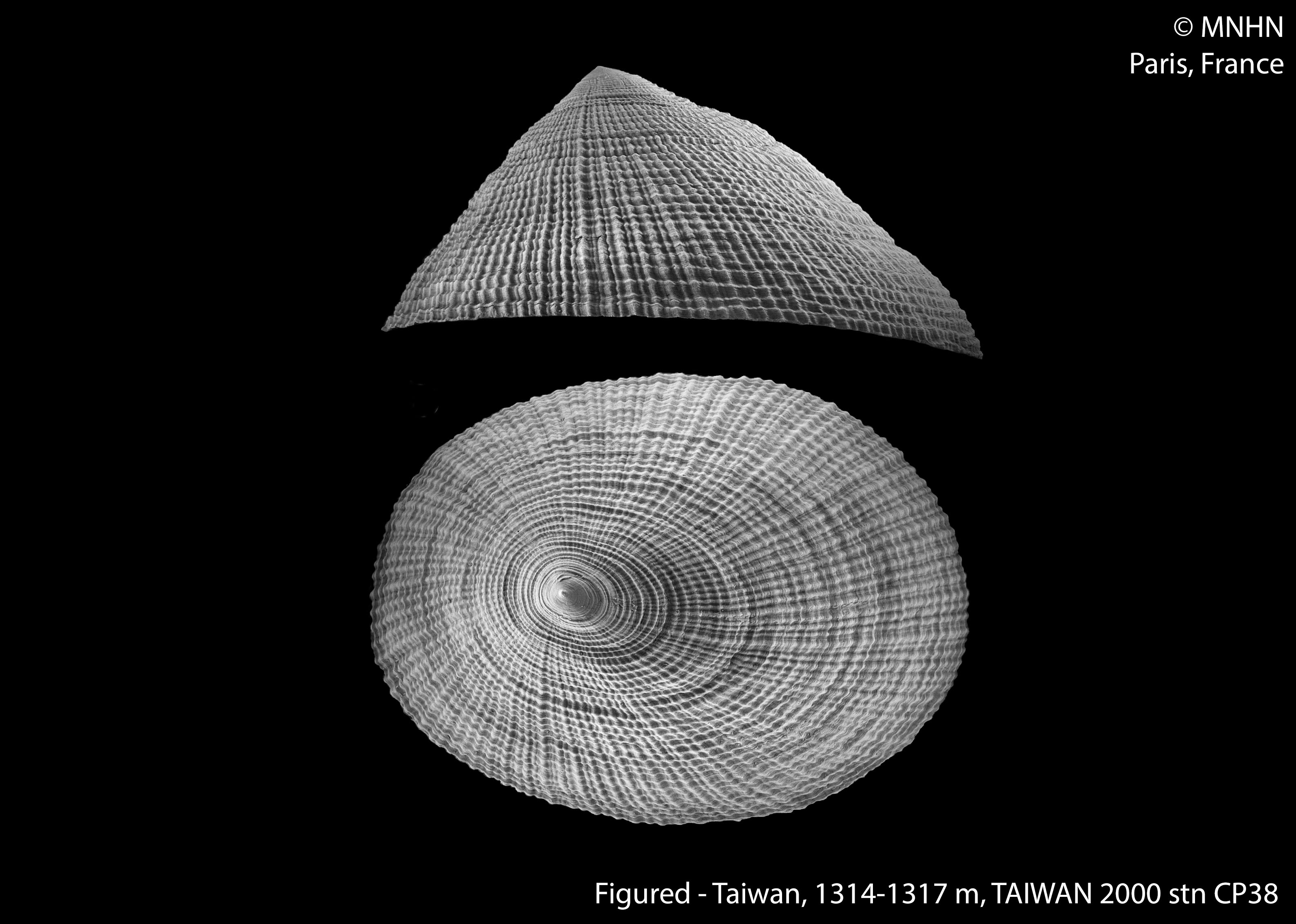
- Pectinodonta orientalis

Scientific classification
- Kingdom: Animalia
- Phylum: Mollusca
- Class: Gastropoda
- Subclass: Patellogastropoda
- Superfamily: Lottioidea
- Family: Pectinodontidae; Pilsbry, 1891

Genera
- See text

= Pectinodontidae =

Family of gastropods

Pectinodontidae is a family of sea snails or true limpets, marine gastropod molluscs in the superfamily Lottioidea, the true limpets.

== Taxonomy ==
This family was previously ranked as subfamily Pectinodontinae (also with Acmaeinae and Rhodopetalinae) in the family Acmeaidae in the taxonomy of the Gastropoda by Bouchet & Rocroi (2005).

Nakano & Ozawa (2007) elevated Pectinodontinae to family level Pectinodontidae based on molecular phylogeny research.

A cladogram showing phylogenic relations of Patellogastropoda:

- Patellogastropoda
  - - - Lottiidae (including Acmaea and Niveotectura)
      - - - Pectinodontidae
          - Lepetidae
        - Nacellidae
    - Patellidae
  - Eoacmaeidae

== Genera ==
Genera in the family Pectinodontidae include:

- Bathyacmaea
- Pectinodonta - the earliest known Pectinodonta are from Late Oligocene
