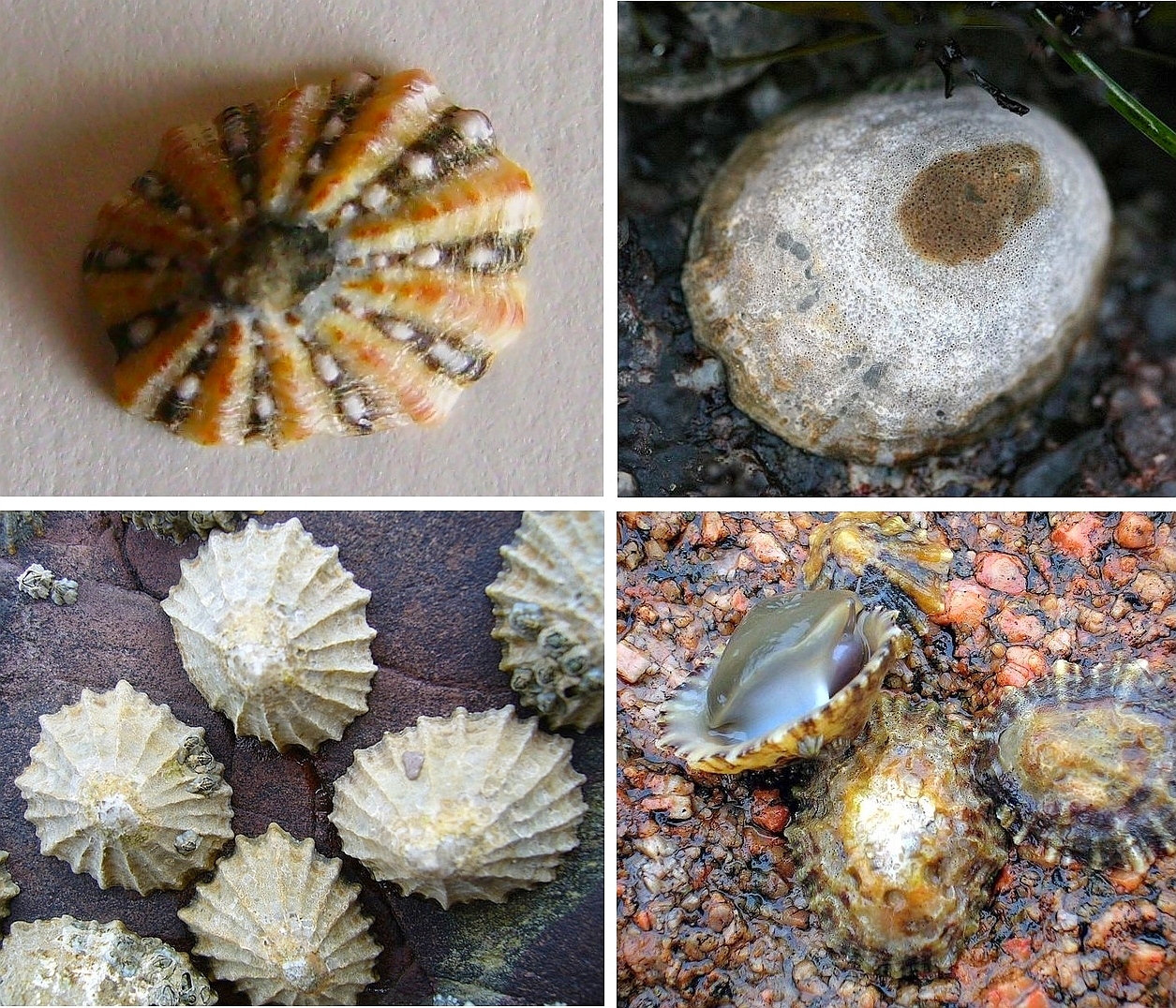
- Images of true limpets, shell and live individuals of three species

Scientific classification
- Kingdom: Animalia
- Phylum: Mollusca
- Class: Gastropoda
- Subclass: Patellogastropoda; Lindberg, 1986

Superfamilies and families
- See text

= Patellogastropoda =

True limpets Temporal range: Middle Ordovician–Recent

Clade of gastropods

The Patellogastropoda, common name true limpets and historically called the Docoglossa, are members of a major phylogenetic group of marine gastropods, treated by experts either as a clade or as a taxonomic order.

The clade Patellogastropoda is deemed monophyletic based on phylogenetic analysis.

== Taxonomy ==
Patellogastropoda was proposed by David R. Lindberg, 1986, as an order, and was later included in the subclass Eogastropoda Ponder & Lindberg, 1996.

=== 2005 taxonomy ===
Bouchet & Rocroi, 2005 designated Patellogastropoda, true limpets, as a clade, rather than as a taxon, but within included superfamilies and families as listed below. Families that are exclusively fossil are indicated with a dagger †:

- Superfamily Patelloidea
  - Family Patellidae
- Superfamily Nacelloidea
  - Family Nacellidae
- Superfamily Lottioidea
  - Family Lottiidae
  - Family Acmaeidae Forbes, 1850
    - subfamily Acmaeinae Forbes, 1850
    - subfamily Pectinodontinae Pilsbry, 1891
    - subfamily Rhodopetalinae Lindberg, 1981
  - Family Lepetidae
- Superfamily Neolepetopsoidea
  - Family Neolepetopsidae
  - † Family Damilinidae
  - † Family Lepetopsidae

With the exception of calling Patellogastropoda a clade rather than an order, as was previously the case in Ponder and Lindberg, 1997 the taxon has not changed much, differing more in the arrangement of its content rather than in the overall composition. Bouchet and Rocroi omitted Ponder and Lindberg's suborders, and added in the superfamily Neolepetopsoidea.

=== 2007 taxonomy ===
Nakano & Ozawa (2007) made many changes in the taxonomy of the Patellogastropoda, based on molecular phylogeny research: Acmaeidae is a synonym of Lottiidae; Pectinodontinae is elevated to Pectinodontidae; new family Eoacmaeidae with the new type genus Eoacmaea is established.

A cladogram based on sequences of mitochondrial 12S ribosomal RNA, 16S ribosomal RNA and cytochrome-c oxidase I (COI) genes showing phylogenic relations of Patellogastropoda by Nakano & Ozawa (2007) and superfamilies based on World Register of Marine Species:

- Patellogastropoda
  - - Lottioidea
      - Lottiidae (including Acmaea and Niveotectura)
      - - - Pectinodontidae
          - Lepetidae
        - Nacellidae
    - Patelloidea
      Patellidae
  - Eoacmaeoidea
    Eoacmaeidae

Note that the family Neolepetopsidae is not in the cladogram above, because its members were not genetically analyzed by Nakano & Ozawa (2007). However, two Neolepetosidae species Eulepetopsis vitrea and Paralepetopsis floridensis were previously analyzed by Harasewych & McArthur (2000), who confirmed their placement within Acmaeoidea/Lottioidea based on analysis of partial 18S rDNA. The Damilinidae and Lepetopsidae are also not included in the cladogram, because they are exclusively fossil families. All of these three families belong to superfamily Lottioidea.

Actual taxonomy based on data by Nakano & Ozawa (2007) with placement of the three remaining families (Neolepetopsidae, Daminilidae, Lepetopsidae) into Lottioidea is like this:

- superfamily Eoacmaeoidea
  - family Eoacmaeidae
- superfamily Patelloidea
  - family Patellidae
- superfamily Lottioidea
  - family Nacellidae
  - family Lepetidae
  - family Pectinodontidae
  - family Lottiidae
  - family Neolepetopsidae
  - † family Damilinidae
  - † family Lepetopsidae

In 2007, two years following Bouchet & Rocroi, 2005, Tomoyuki Nakano and Tomowo Ozawa referred to the order Patellogastropoda.

== Description ==
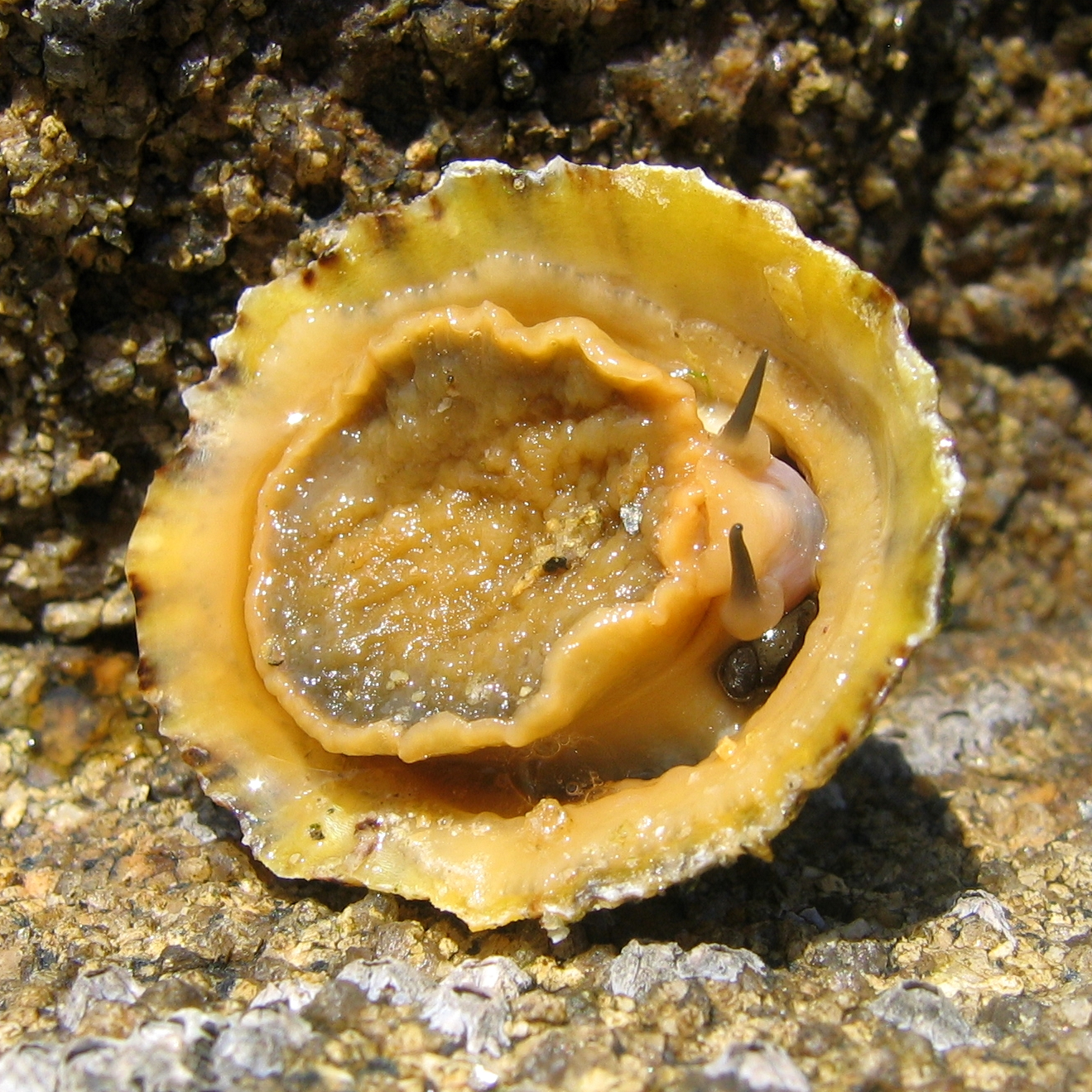
Ventral view of Patella rustica showing its foot and head with tentacles.

Patellogastropoda have flattened, cone-shaped shells, and the majority of species are commonly found adhering strongly to rocks or other hard substrates. Many limpet shells are covered in microscopic growths of green marine algae, which can make them even harder to see, as they can closely resemble the rock surface itself.

The substance making up the teeth in the radula of limpets is among the strongest biological materials known, with a tensile strength about five times stronger than that of spider silk. The teeth are composed of goethite, an iron-based mineral, woven in a particular way into grouped 1μ thick bundles.

Many limpets create a home "scar" on the rock to which they always return between tides, the scar provides excellent protection from predators as well as helping to prevent dehydration during low tides. They adhere to the substratum via the adhesion/ suction of the stiffened foot against the rock surface to which it bonds each time with a layer of pedal mucus.

The majority of limpet species have shells that are less than 3 in (8 cm) in maximum length and many are much smaller. On the other side, the deep-sea species Bathylepeta wadatsumi described in 2025 reached 40.5 mm in shell length.

== Anatomy ==
Internal anatomy without most musculature or circulatory information

The true limpets have an internal structure much like that of other members of Mollusca. Their diffuse nervous system is oriented around three principal pairs of ganglia—the cerebral, pleural (which are hypoathroid), and pedal—located in the animal's snout and surrounding its esophagus in a ring. The pleural and pedal ganglia each send a nerve cord back through the rest of the body, the pleural nerve cords and the pedal or ventral nerve cords (the latter are embedded in the foot musculature in Patellagastropoda). Just outside the pedal ganglia are each of the two statocysts (though see Bathyacmaea secunda as an exception to this rule). Like the keyhole limpets, the true limpets have retained both kidneys though in Patellagastropoda the kidneys both lie on the animal's right side and the further right of the two— the "right" kidney— is much larger than the other. The right kidney also has a sponge-like texture whereas the left kidney is essentially a small sac into which hang folds from the sac's walls. They do not have ctenidia, instead obtaining oxygen through a ring of gill lamellae that encircle the mantle just inside the shell edge and from the surface of the roof of the nuchal cavity which is exposed to air when the animal is no longer under water and which is covered in a network of blood vessels all of which eventually carry oxygenated blood and connect to the auricle through a series of veinlets on the animal's left side. Vestigial ctenidia have been adapted into osphradial patches (one on each side of the mantle cavity) with which the animal can "smell". Their low dome-shaped shell is able to withstand the forces of turbulent intertidal water. Inside, the head bears two tentacles, each with a tiny black "eye spot" at its base (limpets can sense light but cannot see images with these eyes). The heart lies within a pericardium and is composed of a single (morphologically left) auricle, a single ventricle, and bulbous aorta which sends blood to both the anterior and posterior aortae. It lies near the surface of shell on the left, and opposite it on the right are three tubules or "papillae" in a row: that of the left kidney, the anus, and that of the right kidney: all three exit near the same place on the right anterior side inside the mantle cavity.

Between these papillae and the heart lies the neural "visceral twist", a nervous condition called streptoneury or chiastoneury, which characterizes many molluscs and all gastropods whose ancient ancestor had an anus located posterior to its head but which now have it positioned much closer because of a change in the arrangement of the shell. In the evolutionary course of the relocation of the anus, the various ganglia posterior to the pleural and pedal ganglia had to conduct a twist— this means, for example, that the osphradium on the animal's left side is innervated through the right side of its body and vice versa. The condition is called streptoneury, but the phenomenon is known as torsion. In the Patellogastropoda, the twist is located directly behind (i.e., posterior to) the pleural ganglia; in other closely related groups (e.g., Zeugobranchia, Neritopsina, and Ampullariidae) the twist stretches backwards well into the visceral mass (digestive glands, intestines, gonad, etc.).

The digestive gland and interweaving intestine occupy most of the visceral mass behind the head. At the posterior ventral end is the large gonad organ which, when ripe, bursts and empties its gametes into the right kidney from which they are then expelled directly into the surrounding water. One theory of the function of the osphradia is to sense the release of such gametes by other nearby patellogastropods, triggering a corresponding release in any proximate opposite-sex animals of the same species (see diagram for additional anatomic information).

== Distribution ==
Representatives of the true limpets are common inhabitants of rocky shores of all oceans, from tropic to polar regions.

== Habitat ==
Some true limpets live throughout the intertidal zone, from the high zone (upper littoral zone) to the shallow subtidal, but other species live in deep sea and their habitat include hydrothermal vents, whalebone (baleen), whale-fall and sulphide seeps. A few species are found in brackish habitats, and one possibly extinct species (Potamacmaea fluviatilis) is known from estuaries and tributaries which drain into the Bay of Bengal.

They attach themselves to the substrate using pedal mucus and a foot. They locomote using wave-like muscular contractions of the foot when conditions are suitable for them to graze. They can also "clamp down" against the rock surface with very considerable force when necessary, and this ability enables them to remain safely attached, despite the dangerous wave action on exposed rocky shores. The ability to clamp down also seals the shell edge against the rock surface, protecting them from desiccation during low tide, despite their being in full sunlight.

When true limpets are fully clamped down, it is impossible to remove them from the rock using brute force alone, and the limpet will allow itself to be destroyed rather than stop clinging to its rock. This survival strategy has led to the limpet being used as a metaphor for obstinacy or stubbornness.

== Life habits ==
=== Feeding ===
Most limpets feed by grazing on algae which grows on the rock (or other surfaces) where they live. They scrape up films of algae with a radula, a ribbon-like tongue with rows of teeth. Limpets move by rippling the muscles of their foot in a wave-like motion.

In some parts of the world, certain smaller species of true limpet are specialized to live on seagrasses and graze on the microscopic algae which grow there. Other species live on, and graze directly on, the stipes (stalks) of brown algae (kelp).

=== Homing behaviour ===
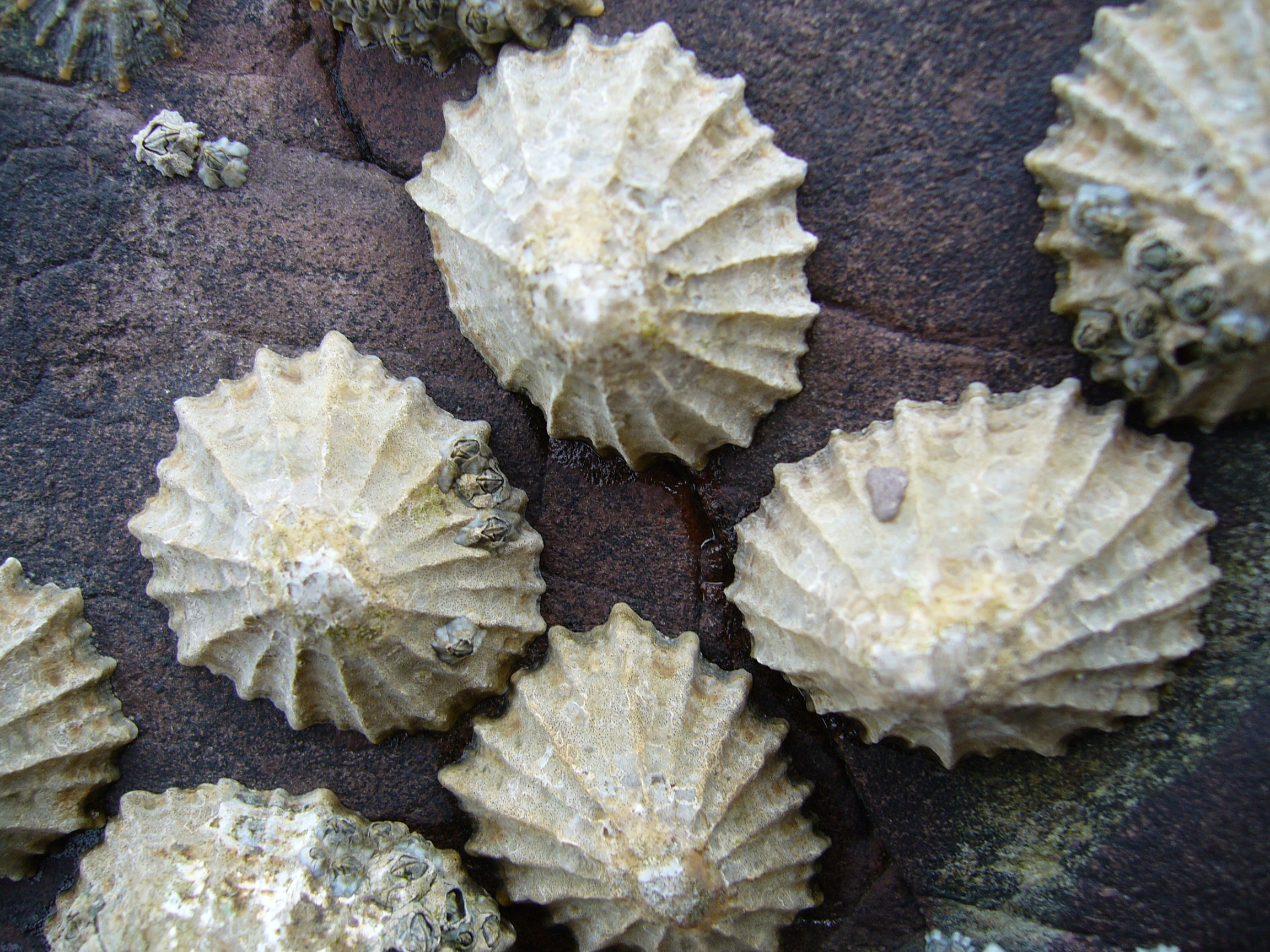
Patella vulgata in Pembrokeshire, Wales.

Some species of limpets return to the same spot on the rock known as a "home scar" just before the tide recedes. In such species, the shape of their shell often grows to precisely match the contours of the rock surrounding the scar. This behaviour presumably allows them to form a better seal to the rock and may help protect them from both predation and desiccation.

It is still unclear how limpets find their way back to the same spot each time, but it is thought that they follow pheromones in the mucus left as they move. Other species, notably Lottia gigantea seem to "garden" a patch of algae around their home scar. They are one of the few invertebrates to exhibit territoriality and will aggressively push other organisms out of this patch by ramming with their shell, thereby allowing their patch of algae to grow for their own grazing.

=== Predators and other risks ===
Limpets are preyed upon by a variety of organisms including starfish, shore-birds, fish, seals, and humans. Limpets exhibit a variety of defenses, such as fleeing or clamping their shells against the substratum. The defense response can be determined by the type of predator, which can often be detected chemically by the limpet.

Limpets can be long lived, with tagged specimens surviving for more than 10 years. If the limpet lives on bare rock, it grows at a slower rate but can live for up to 20 years.

Limpets found on exposed shores, which have fewer rock pools than sheltered shores and are thus in less frequent contact with water, have a greater risk of desiccation due to the effects of increased sunlight, water evaporation and the increased wind speed. To avoid drying out they will clamp to the rock they inhabit, minimizing water-loss from the rim around their base. As this occurs chemicals are released that promote the vertical growth of the limpet's shell.

=== Reproduction ===
Spawning occurs once a year, usually during winter, and is triggered by rough seas which disperse the eggs and sperm. Larvae float around for a couple of weeks before settling onto a hard substrate.

== Human use ==
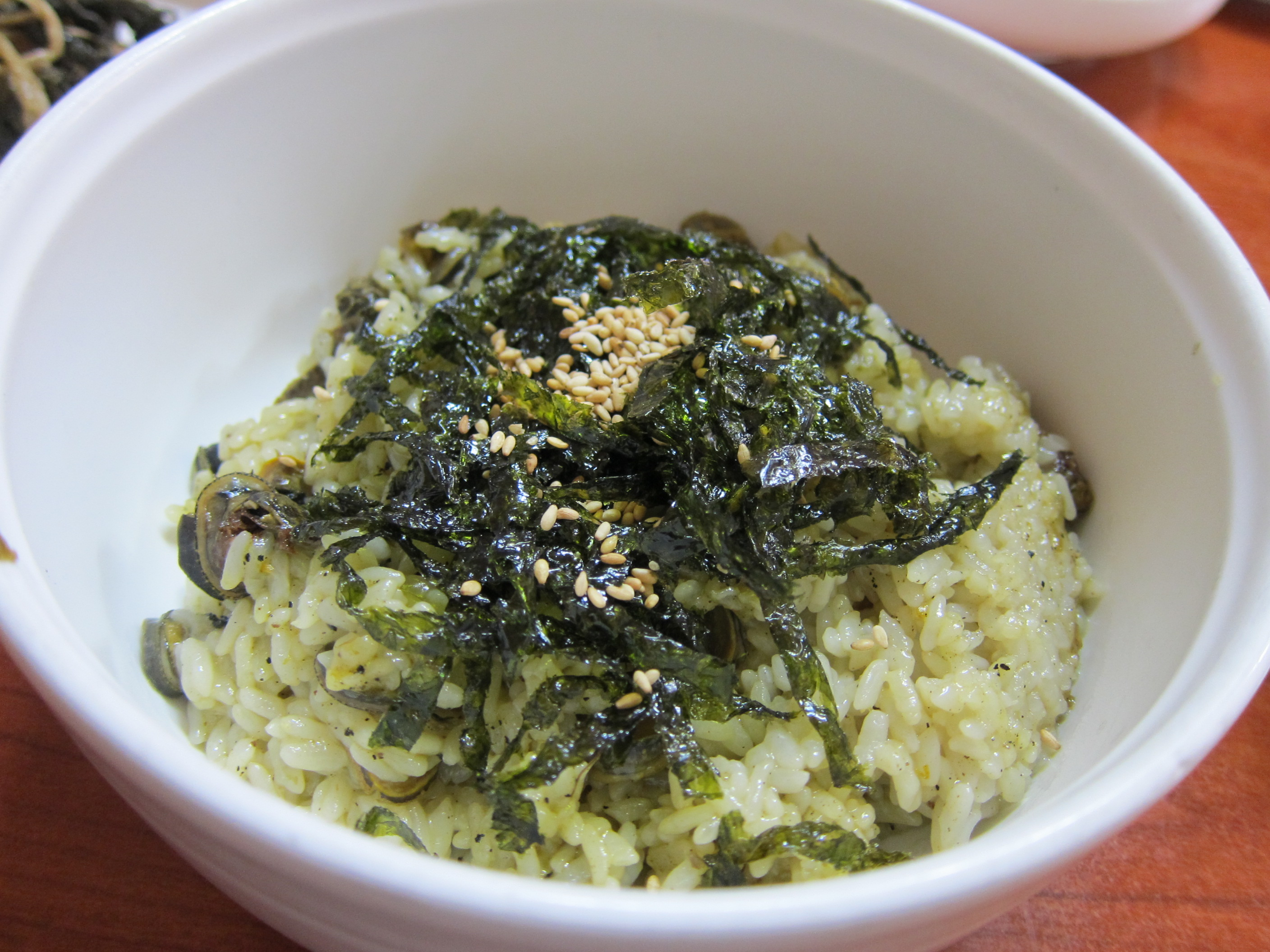
Ttagaebi-bap (limpet rice)

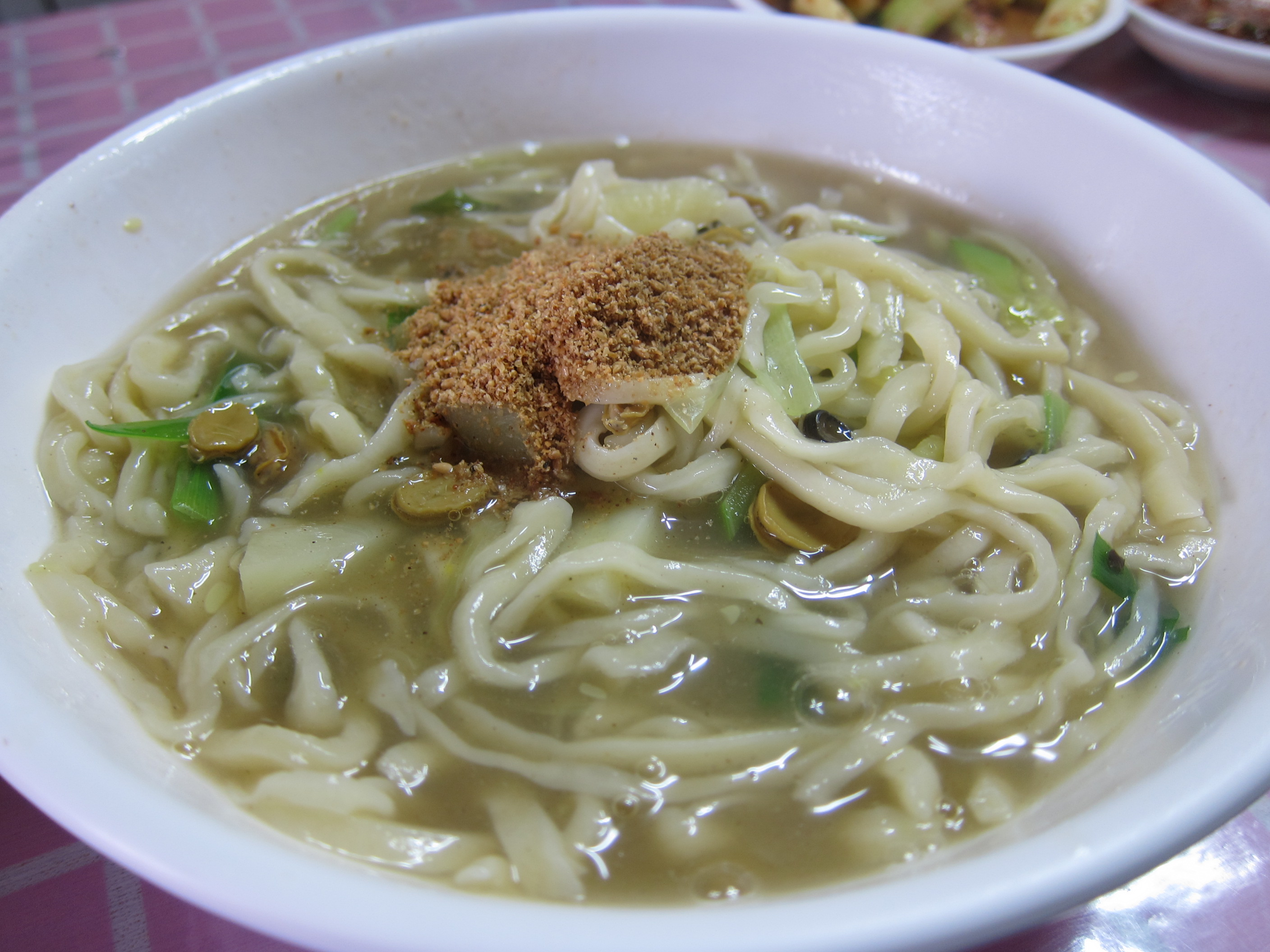
Ttagaebi-kal-guksu (limpet noodle soup)

Larger limpet species are, or were historically, cooked and eaten in many different parts of the world. For example, in Hawaii, limpets (Cellana species) are commonly known as 'opihi, and are considered a delicacy; the meat sells for $25 - $42 a pound (454g). In Portugal, limpets are known as lapas and are also considered to be a delicacy. In Chile they are also called "lapas" but are so abundant that it's just considered a regular dish. Within Gaelic Scotland and Ireland, a limpet is known as a báirnach, and Martin Martin recorded (on Jura) limpets being boiled to use in a substitute for breast milk. In Ulleungdo, a Korean island, limpets are called ttagaebi (따개비) and are used to make ttagaebi-bap (limpet rice) and ttagaebi-kal-guksu (limpet noodle soup)
