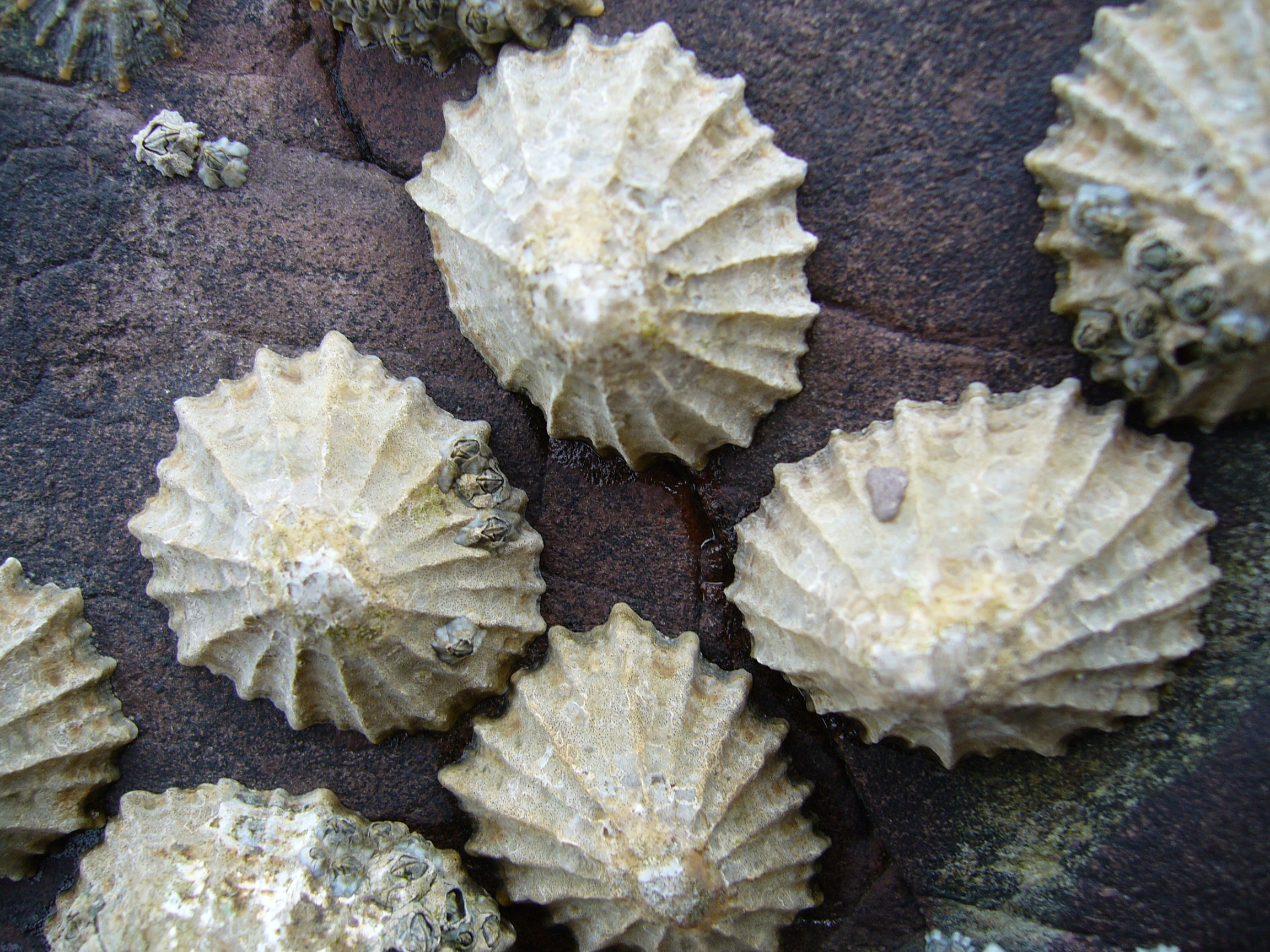
- A group of live Patella vulgata on a rock in Wales

Scientific classification
- Kingdom: Animalia
- Phylum: Mollusca
- Class: Gastropoda
- Subclass: Patellogastropoda
- Family: Patellidae
- Genus: Patella; Linnaeus, 1758

Type species
- Patella vulgata Linnaeus, 1758

Synonyms
- Ansates G.B. Sowerby II, 1839; Costatopatella Pallary, 1913; Helcion (Ansates) Sowerby II, 1839; Patella (Patella) Linnaeus, 1758; Patellastra Monterosato, 1884; Patellus Montfort, 1810 (Invalid: unjustified emendation of Patella); Patina Gray, 1847

= Patella (gastropod) =

Patella Temporal range: Eocene–Recent

Genus of gastropods

Patella is a genus of herbivorous marine sea snails, commonly known as limpets, in the family Patellidae within the class Gastropoda. Primarily a marine group of prosobranch gastropods, they typically live on tidal shores in non-tropical climates. As limpets in the family Patellidae, they are a sister group to the other three accepted genera: Cymbula, Helcion, and Scutellastra. Members of the genus Patella are characterized by a cup-shaped shell and gills, and move by means of muscular waves along the foot.

Patella species are found in north-eastern Atlantic and Mediterranean tidal zones. Surveys conducted over the habitat distributions of the four generas show that Patella is generally the northernmost genus, the other three distributed along southeastern Africa towards Asia.

== Taxonomy and morphology ==
The Patella genus includes the species Patella vulgata, Patella aspera, and Patella caerulea, among others, and is a member of the family Patellidae (common name: common limpet).

=== Shells ===
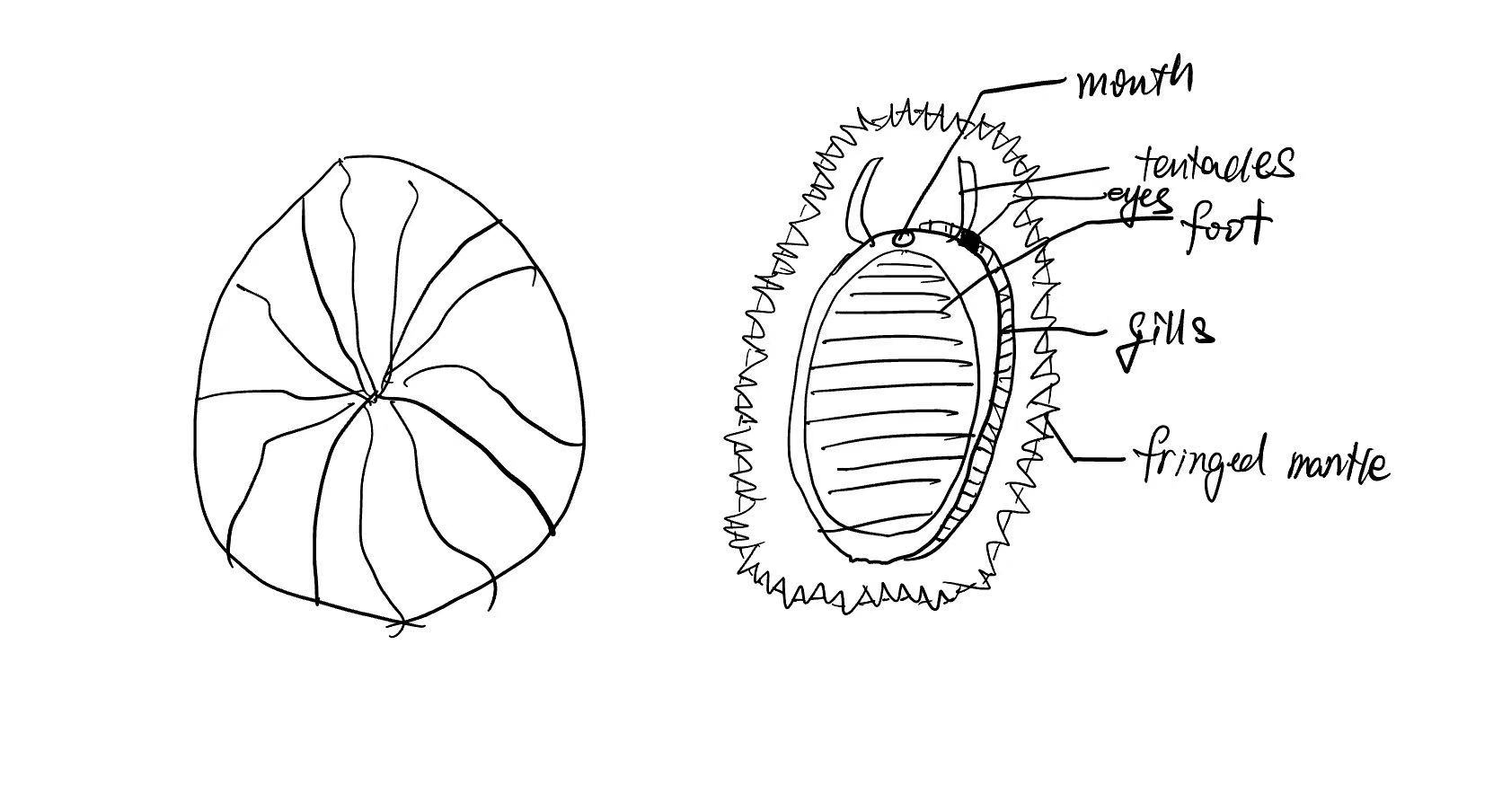
Shells and internal structures of Patella

Patella shells are single-valved shells with radial sculpture and are made of calcium carbonate. Their shells are typically depressed, conical, and non-coiled, protecting them from heavy wave action through their stable structural shape. As a limpet, Patella has a ventral muscular foot, providing adhesive force to substrates such as rocks through suction and the secretion of mucus. The foot is composed of dorso-ventral and transverse muscles. Longitudinal muscles are absent. Locomotion relies forward-motion retrograde waves, during which sections of the foot lift approximately 0.2 mm from the substrate. Patella typically moves in a forward direction via a ditaxic pedal wave. Backward motion is rare.

=== Radula ===
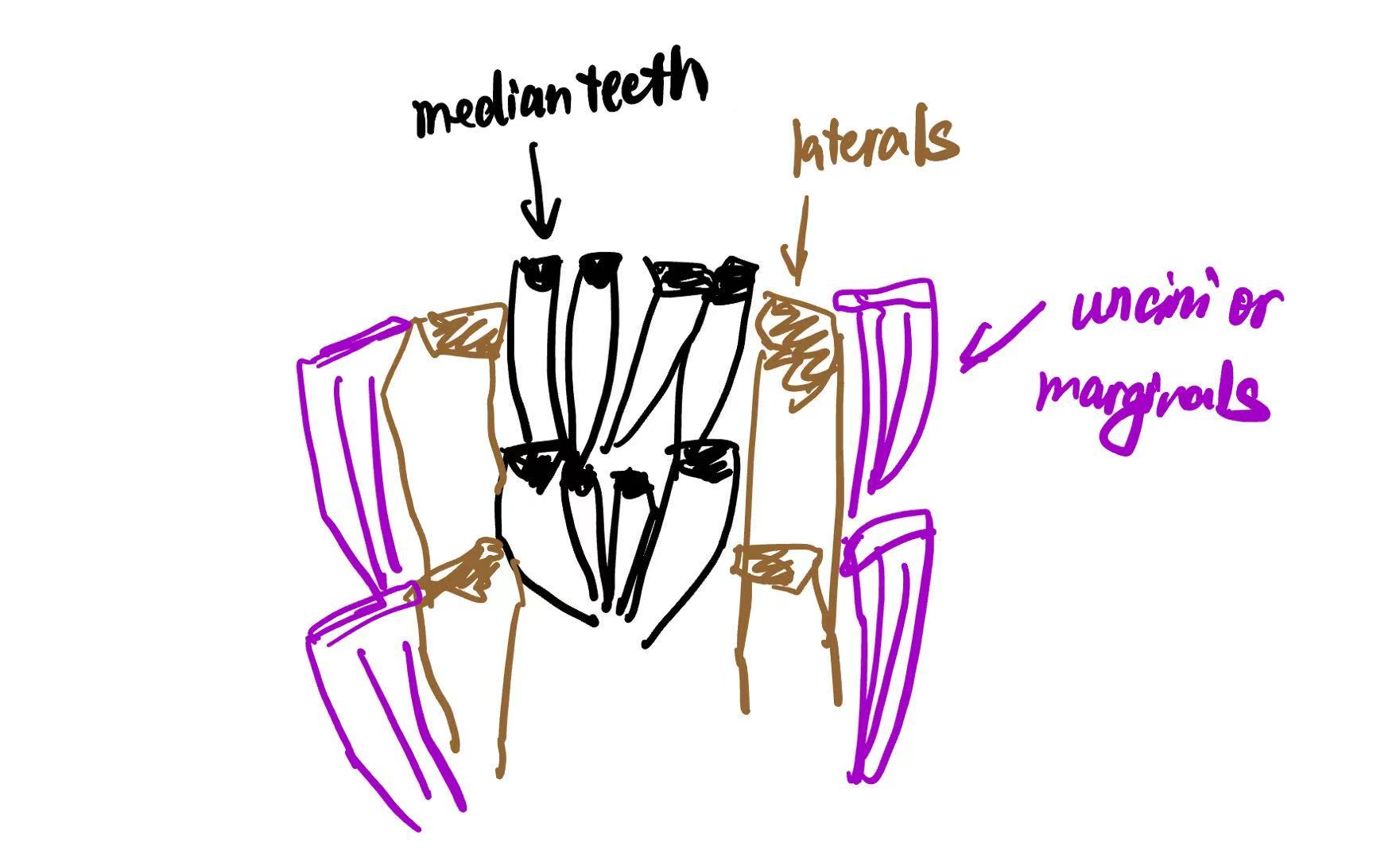
Radula units

The radula of Patella consists of iron and silica. During radular development, the protein matrix of the bases and cusps, which are rich in tyrosine and tryptophan complexes with chitin, undergoes mineralization to incorporate iron and silica. The radula of common limpets has opaque teeth and can be detected by transmitted light. The median teeth are surrounded by laterals and uncini.

=== Gills ===
As marine species, Patella breathe using gills. The morphology of their gills is akin to a "double comb" structure, hence the name ctenidia. It functions as the gas exchange organ which takes up oxygen and discards carbon dioxide. Patella possess secondary gills with the gill filaments located at the pallial groove, unlike the terrestrial snails which have a reduced primary gill and are unable to breathe air through gills.

=== Eyes and other sensory organs ===
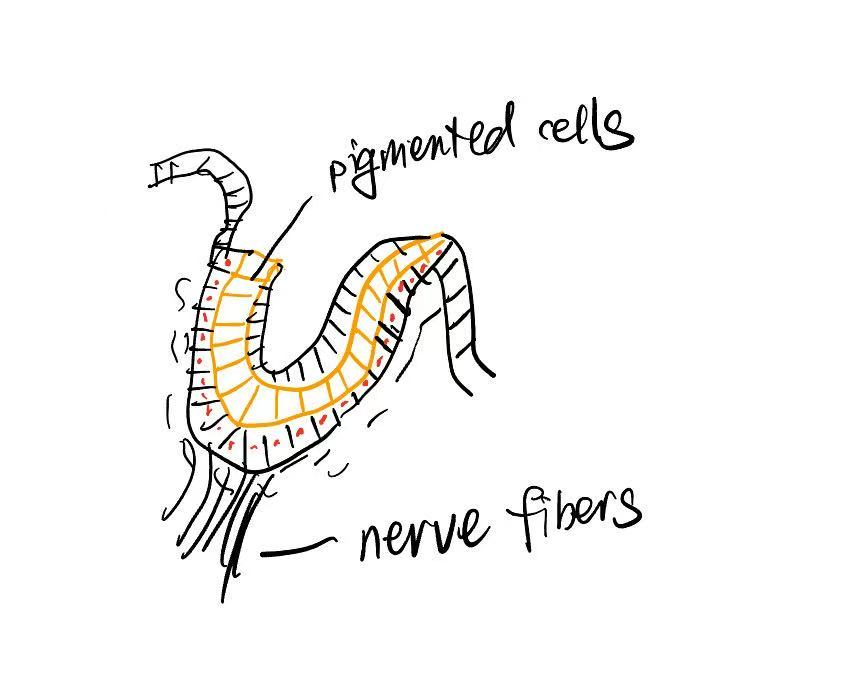
Simple cup shaped eye

The eyes of Patella form a simple cup lined with pigmented cells. These structures receive lateral rays of light to detect shifts between dark and light fields but cannot construct true images. This minimal sensory architecture matches that of certain clams, corresponding with their sedentary lifestyle on rocky substrates.

Patella also have balancing organs called statocysts. Statocysts consist of statoliths floating against the wall of statocysts and function as sensory organs. Hairs and cilia detect and transfer the statolith signal to pedal ganglia or the pleuro-pedal connectives which are controlled by cerebral ganglia.

Another chemo-sensory organ, the osphradium comes in pairs as large structures in the pallial cavity. The osphradium functions to detect water quality and mating opportunities. It also can prevent predators like sea stars and netted dog whelk from hunting them.

=== Nerve system ===
The nervous system of Patella experiences torsion similar to pulmonate snails (land snails). After torsion, the pericarya of nerve cells concentrated at the anterior end form two pairs of cerebral ganglia connected by circumoesophageal connectives without myelin sheaths. Cerebral ganglia connect to structures such as: tentacles, eyes, statocysts, lips, penis, pharynx, salivary glands and stomach. No brain is present in Patella, though this isn't abnormal as the brains of molluscs are highly reduced except in cephalopods.

== Habitat, niche and life cycle ==
The preferred niche of Patella is coasts, embayments or estuaries with salinity between 30-40 psu, and their preferred substratum habitats are bedrock, cobbles and crevices. Their niche tends to withstand changing levels in suspended sediment, water flow rates, temperature, turbidity, and wave exposure.

Patella vulgata has been documented to live in salinities lower than 20 psu (practical salinity units) and with low seaweed abundance. In their habitat, they can bear strong tides, changing water levels, with preference to different levels of eulittoral zones. The climates of their habitats vary from seasonally variable sunshine to cold Arctic-like temperatures as the species' range expands.

Patella have a larval stage after spawning between October and January through external fertilization. The larvae are planktotrophic and green in coloration due to the pigment chromoprotein Y. These pelagic larvae can swim for 2–10 days and travel distances greater than 10 kilometers to find rocks to settle on and form shells.

== Reproduction and development ==
=== Reproduction ===
Both hermaphroditism and gonochorism are common in gastropods. The common limpet, Patella vulgata, is a protandrous hermaphrodite, while Patella depressa is gonochoric. Being protandrous, the limpets with larger sizes in P. vulgata are predominantly females, changing from male to female as they grow.

Extant gastropods have lost one of their gonads, and the one that they possess is situated next to the digestive gland. The gonoduct carries the gametes produced by their gonad out of the body. In patellogastropods and vetigastropods, the gonoduct is called the urogenital duct, as the gonoduct develops alongside the right nephridium in both clades. Thus, this duct functions to transport both gametes and urine. P. vulgata does not possess a penis or uterus, and engages in broadcast spawning.

=== Development ===
P. vulgata undergoes spiral cleavage and during gastrulation yolk cells occupy the blastocoel. Planktonic trochophore larva, that later on develop into veliger larva, are also present within this species of patellid. P. vulgata also undergoes torsion between its trochophore and veliger larval stages before it takes on a sedentary lifestyle, settling onto a substrate to metamorphose into an adult limpet.

== Diet ==
Like the majority of limpets, Patella spp. are herbivores, and primarily eat thin films of algae on the substrates they attach to. Thus, their diet is mainly composed of algae and other cyanobacteria. They use their radula, an anatomical feature that is unique to mollusks, to rasp and grind up food. Although this feature is a synapomorphy of the Phylum Mollusca, it is absent in bivalves.

Patella spp. feeding behaviors are dependent on circatidal and circadian rhythms, often seeing higher feeding activity with the correct season and tidal cycle. P. caerulea shows significant activity during the night time and under submergence, following a 12 hour circatidal clock for its feeding behavior. Patella spp. also exhibit feeding manoeuvres, such as P. vulgata presenting looped movements around their attachment site, often relying on decision making to efficiently use its energy.

== Environmental impact ==
Patella spp. are herbivorous, which makes them particularly well suited for monitoring algal coverage. The environmental effects associated with limpet grazing on Fucale and green algae are numerous. The barnacle species, Semibalanus balanoides, benefits from the grazing behavior of Patella. S. balanoides competes with algae for substrate. Patella feeds on both fucoid and green algae, thus removing them from their substrate, allowing S. balanoides area for substrate attachment. Thus, Patella grazing regulates algal growth, while enhancing S. balanoides settlement, outlining Patella's role as a keystone species as well.

While grazing for algae and other cyanobacteria, their sharp radula scrapes away at limestone too. Therefore, Patella also contribute greatly to the erosion and breakdown of limestone coasts.

== Conservation ==
Members of the genus Patella are important components of rocky intertidal ecosystems, where they help maintain ecological balance through their grazing activity and interactions with other organisms. They are also subject to high levels of environmental stress, making them useful indicator organisms for assessing the health of coastal habitats. As a result, many tidal ecosystems supporting Patella populations are included within Marine Protected Areas (MPAs), both to reduce impacts from overharvesting and to support monitoring of coastal biodiversity.

The genus is particularly sensitive to marine pollution and has been widely used in marine biodiversity and environmental monitoring research. Species such as Patella caerulea are employed in bioindicator studies to assess ocean acidification and to evaluate the impacts of climate change on marine ecosystems.

Human activity and distribution of Mediterranean marine species can be the cause of the problems with the conservation of Patella. Additionally, the genetic variability detected by polymorphic microsatellite markers in Patella populations has only 0.41% variability between populations without isolation of the species. The difficulty of gene flow between species is due to both biotic and abiotic factors.

Conservation of Patella ferruginea has involved the establishment of MPAs to safeguard adult populations. These protected areas help maintain viable breeding populations and can enhance larval dispersal, thereby promoting an increase in gene flow among populations. Increased gene flow is considered beneficial for the long-term conservation of the species by improving genetic diversity and population resilience.

Another solution is to use artificial portable plates (APPs) on the rocks of Western Mediterranean Sea to retain more Patella, because moving to new environment can cause death of limpets and using APPs could reduce mortality and conserve the population by preventing detachment and translocation.

== Species ==
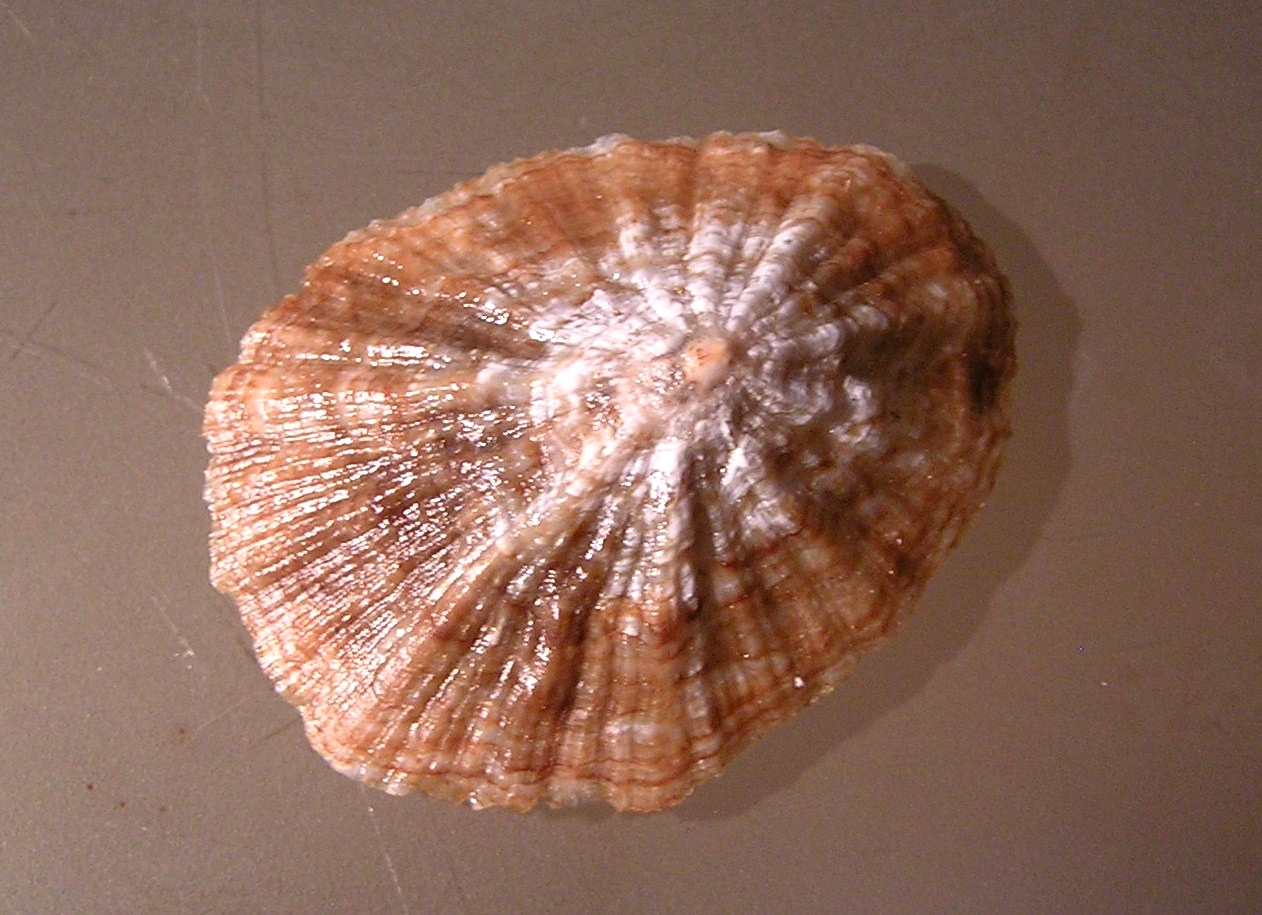
shell of Patella gomesii

Species within the genus Patella include:

- † Patella alessiae Forli, Dell'Angelo, Montagna & Taviani, 2004
- † Patella alternicostata Sandberger, 1859
- † Patella ambroggii Lecointre, 1952
- †Patella amuritica Wilckens, 1922
- Patella argentaurum Lesson, 1831
- Patella aspera Röding, 1798
- Patella caerulea Linnaeus, 1758
- Patella candei d'Orbigny, 1839
- Patella crocata R.P. Lesson, 1831
- Patella cyanea R.P. Lesson, 1831
- Patella depressa Pennant, 1777 - Patella depressa is a nomen dubium according to Christiaens (1973, 1983); Patella intermedia gets priority. Nevertheless the name Patella depressa is in usage among British authors (e.g. Graham, 1988) and is assumed as valid.
- Patella depsta Reeve, 1855: (taxon inquirendum)
- † Patella estotiensis Lozouet, 1999
- Patella ferruginea Gmelin, 1791
- Patella gomesii Drouet, 1858
- † Patella hebertiana (d'Orbigny, 1850)
- Patella lugubris Gmelin, 1791
- † Patella mahamensis Martín-González, 2018
- † Patella matheyi De Loriol in De Loriol & Koby, 1890
- † Patella maxoratensis Martín-González & Vera-Peláez, 2018
- † Patella nelsonensis Trechmann, 1918
- Patella ordinaria Mabille, 1888
- Patella pellucida Linnaeus, 1758
- Patella piperata Gould, 1846
- † Patella protea Doderlein, 1862
- Patella rangiana Rochebrune, 1882
- Patella rustica Linnaeus, 1758
- Patella skelettensis Massier, 2009
- † Patella staceata Gründel, Hostettler & Menkveld-Gfeller, 2020
- Patella swakopmundensis Massier, 2009
- Patella tenuis Gmelin, 1791
- † Patella tintina Martín-González & Vera-Peláez, 2018
- Patella ulyssiponensis Gmelin, 1791 - synonyms: Patella aspera Lamarck, 1819; Patella athletica Bean, 1844
- Patella variabilis Krauss, 1848
- Patella vulgata Linnaeus, 1758

== Species brought into synonymy ==
List of synonyms of Patella
- Patella achates Reeve, 1855: synonym of Acmaea achates (Reeve, 1855)
- Patella aculeata Gmelin, 1791: synonym of Bostrycapulus aculeatus (Gmelin, 1791)
- Patella adansonii Dunker, 1853: synonym of Cymbula safiana (Lamarck, 1819)
- Patella afra Gmelin, 1791: synonym of Trimusculus afer (Gmelin, 1791)
- Patella alba da Costa, 1771: synonym of Patella caerulea Linnaeus, 1758
- Patella alba Anton, 1838: synonym of Patella caerulea Linnaeus, 1758
- Patella albescens Philippi, 1846: synonym of Iothia albescens (Philippi, 1846)
- Patella albida Mörch, 1853: synonym of Cymbula nigra (da Costa, 1771): synonym of Cymbula safiana (Lamarck, 1819)
- Patella algira Deshayes, 1840: synonym of Cymbula nigra (da Costa, 1771): synonym of Cymbula safiana (Lamarck, 1819)
- Patella ambigua Dillwyn, 1817: synonym of Scutus anatinus (Donovan, 1820)
- Patella amoena Say, 1822: synonym of Testudinalia testudinalis (O. F. Müller, 1776)
- Patella amphitrite Turton, 1932: synonym of Scutellastra barbara (Linnaeus, 1758)
- Patella anatina Donovan, 1820: synonym of Scutus anatinus (Donovan, 1820)
- Patella ancyloides Forbes, 1840, non J de C Sowerby, 1824 and Patella exigua W. Thompson, 1844 are synonyms for Propilidium exiguum (W. Thompson, 1844)
- Patella apertura Montagu, 1803: synonym of Diodora graeca (Linnaeus, 1758)
- Patella aphanes Robson, 1986: synonym of Scutellastra aphanes (Robson, 1986)
- Patella araucana d'Orbigny, 1839: synonym of Scurria araucana (d'Orbigny, 1839)
- Patella ardosiaea Hombron & Jacquinot, 1841: synonym of Cellana ardosiaea (Hombron & Jacquinot, 1841)
- Patella argenvillei Krauss, 1848: synonym of Scutellastra argenvillei (Krauss, 1848)
- Patella articulata Reeve, 1855: synonym of Cellana cylindrica (Gmelin, 1791)
- Patella aspera Lamarck, 1819: synonym of Patella ulyssiponensis Gmelin, 1791
- Patella aster Reeve, 1855: synonym of Cellana rota (Gmelin, 1791)
- Patella athletica Bean, 1844: synonym of Patella ulyssiponensis Gmelin, 1791
- Patella auricola da Costa, 1771: synonym of Patella depressa Pennant, 1777
- Patella auricularia Lightfoot, 1786: synonym of Dolabella auricularia (Lightfoot, 1786)
- Patella australis Lamarck, 1819: synonym of Sabia conica (Schumacher, 1817)
- Patella axiaerata Verco, 1912: synonym of Asteracmea axiaerata (Verco, 1912)
- Patella azorica Nuttal in Jay, 1852: synonym of Patella ulyssiponensis Gmelin, 1791
- Patella barbara Linnaeus, 1758: synonym of Scutellastra barbara (Linnaeus, 1758)
- Patella barbata Lamarck, 1819: synonym of Scutellastra barbara (Linnaeus, 1758)
- Patella baudonii Drouet, 1858: synonym of Patella ulyssiponensis Gmelin, 1791
- Patella bifida Fischer von Waldheim, 1807: synonym of Scutellastra barbara (Linnaeus, 1758)
- Patella bimaculata Montagu, 1803: synonym of Ansates pellucida (Linnaeus, 1758): synonym of Patella pellucida Linnaeus, 1758
- Patella boninensis Pilsbry, 1891: synonym of Cellana mazatlandica (G. B. Sowerby I, 1839)
- Patella bonnardii Payraudeau, 1826: synonym of Patella ulyssiponensis Gmelin, 1791
- Patella borbonica Bory de Saint-Vincent, 1804: synonym of Septaria borbonica (Bory de Saint-Vincent, 1804)
- Patella caeca O. F. Müller, 1776: synonym of Lepeta caeca (O. F. Müller, 1776)
- Patella calamus Crosse & P. Fischer, 1864: synonym of Eoacmaea calamus (Crosse & P. Fischer, 1864)
- Patella calicula Li Chang, 1930: synonym of Patella caerulea Linnaeus, 1758
- Patella cancellata Risso, 1826: synonym of Patella caerulea Linnaeus, 1758
- Patella candeana d'Orbigny, 1847: synonym of Lottia antillarum G. B. Sowerby I, 1834
- Patella candida Couthouy, 1838: synonym of Lepeta caeca (O. F. Müller, 1776)
- Patella canescens Gmelin, 1791: synonym of Cymbula canescens (Gmelin, 1791)
- Patella capensis Gmelin, 1791: synonym of Cellana radiata (Born, 1778)
- Patella ceciliana (Orbigny, 1841): synonym of Scurria ceciliana (d'Orbigny, 1841)
- Patella cernica (H. Adams, 1869): synonym of Cellana livescens (Reeve, 1855)
- Patella chapmani Tenison-Woods, 1875: synonym of Scutellastra chapmani (Tenison-Woods, 1875)
- Patella chinensis Linnaeus, 1758: synonym of Calyptraea chinensis (Linnaeus, 1758)
- Patella chitonoides Reeve, 1854: synonym of Scutellastra exusta (Reeve, 1854)
- Patella cinnamomea Gould, 1846: synonym of Phenacolepas cinnamomea (Gould, 1846)
- Patella citrullus Gould, 1846: synonym of Patella candei d'Orbigny, 1839
- Patella clathratula Reeve, 1854: synonym of Cellana ardosiaea (Hombron & Jacquinot, 1841)
- Patella clealandi Fleming, 1828: synonym of Testudinalia testudinalis (O. F. Müller, 1776)
- Patella clypea Brown, 1827: synonym of Testudinalia testudinalis (O. F. Müller, 1776)
- Patella clypeater Lesson, 1831: synonym of Nacella clypeater (Lesson, 1831)
- Patella cochlear Born, 1778: synonym of Scutellastra cochlear (Born, 1778)
- Patella coeruleata da Costa, 1778: synonym of Ansates pellucida (Linnaeus, 1758): synonym of Patella pellucida Linnaeus, 1758
- Patella coffea (Reeve, 1855): synonym of Scurria variabilis (G. B. Sowerby I, 1839)
- Patella compressa Linnaeus, 1758: synonym of Cymbula compressa (Linnaeus, 1758)
- Patella concolor f. polygramma Tomlin, 1931: synonym of Helcion concolor (Krauss, 1848)
- Patella conica Anton, 1838: synonym of Patella vulgata Linnaeus, 1758
- Patella conspicua Philippi, 1849: synonym of Cymbula nigra (da Costa, 1771): synonym of Cymbula safiana (Lamarck, 1819)
- Patella cornea Helbling, 1779: synonym of Ansates pellucida (Linnaeus, 1758): synonym of Patella pellucida Linnaeus, 1758
- Patella costata Lesson, 1831: synonym of Fissurella costata Lesson, 1831
- Patella costosoplicata Mörch, 1853: synonym of Patella ferruginea Gmelin, 1791
- Patella crepidula Linnaeus, 1767: synonym of Crepidula unguiformis Lamarck, 1822
- Patella cretacea Reeve, 1854: synonym of Scutellastra flexuosa (Quoy & Gaimard, 1834)
- Patella cylindrica Gmelin, 1791: synonym of Cellana cylindrica (Gmelin, 1791)
- Patella cypria Gmelin, 1791: synonym of Patella ferruginea Gmelin, 1791
- Patella cypridium Perry, 1811: synonym of Ansates pellucida (Linnaeus, 1758): synonym of Patella pellucida Linnaeus, 1758
- Patella deflexa Helbling, 1779: synonym of Siphonaria deflexa (Helbling, 1779) (nomen dubium)
- † Patella deformis K. Martin, 1883: synonym of † Cellana deformis (K. Martin, 1883)
- Patella digitata Fischer von Waldheim, 1807: synonym of Scutellastra longicosta (Lamarck, 1819)
- Patella dilatata Lamarck, 1822: synonym of Crepipatella dilatata (Lamarck, 1822)
- Patella dira Reeve, 1855: synonym of Cellana dira (Reeve, 1855)
- Patella donacina Anton, 1838: synonym of Patella ulyssiponensis Gmelin, 1791
- Patella electrina Reeve, 1854: synonym of Patella depressa Pennant, 1777
- Patella emarginuloides Philippi, 1868: synonym of Iothia emarginuloides (Philippi, 1868)
- Patella enneagona Reeve, 1854: synonym of Cellana cylindrica (Gmelin, 1791)
- Patella equestris Linnaeus, 1758: synonym of Cheilea equestris (Linnaeus, 1758)
- Patella exigua Thompson W., 1844: synonym of Propilidium exiguum (W. Thompson, 1844)
- Patella extinctorium Turton, 1819: synonym of Pomatoceros triqueter (Linnaeus, 1758): synonym of Spirobranchus triqueter (Linnaeus, 1758)
- Patella exusta Reeve, 1854 and Patella pica Reeve, 1854 are synonyms for Scutellastra exusta (Reeve, 1854)
- Patella farquhari Turton, 1932: synonym of Helcion concolor (Krauss, 1848)
- Patella favaniana Risso, 1826: synonym of Patella caerulea Linnaeus, 1758
- Patella fissura Linnaeus, 1758: synonym of Emarginula fissura (Linnaeus, 1758)
- Patella flava Hutton, 1873: synonym of Cellana flava (Hutton, 1873)
- Patella flexuosa Quoy & Gaimard, 1834 and Patella stellaeformis Reeve, 1842 are synonyms for Scutellastra flexuosa (Quoy & Gaimard, 1834)
- Patella forbesi Smith J., 1839: synonym of Iothia fulva (O. F. Müller, 1776)
- Patella fornicata Linnaeus, 1758: synonym of Crepidula fornicata (Linnaeus, 1758)
- Patella fragilis Philippi, 1836: synonym of Patella caerulea Linnaeus, 1758
- Patella fraunfeldi Dunker, 1866: synonym of Patella piperata Gould, 1846
- Patella fulva O. F. Müller, 1776: synonym of Iothia fulva (O. F. Müller, 1776)
- Patella fungoides Da Costa, 1771: synonym of Scutellastra barbara (Linnaeus, 1758)
- Patella fusca Landt, 1800: synonym of Ansates pellucida (Linnaeus, 1758): synonym of Patella pellucida Linnaeus, 1758
- Patella galathea Lamarck, 1819: synonym of Phenacolepas galathea (Lamarck, 1819)
- Patella galeata Helbing, 1779: synonym of Diodora galeata (Helbing, 1779)
- Patella garconi Deshayes, 1863: synonym of Cellana livescens (Reeve, 1855)
- Patella goreensis Gmelin, 1791: synonym of Crepidula unguiformis Lamarck, 1822
- Patella gorgonica da Costa, 1771: synonym of Patella rustica Linnaeus, 1758
- Patella goudoti Mabille, 1888: synonym of Patella depressa Pennant, 1777
- Patella graeca Linnaeus, 1758: synonym of Diodora graeca (Linnaeus, 1758)
- Patella granatina Linnaeus, 1758: synonym of Cymbula granatina (Linnaeus, 1758)
- Patella granostriata Reeve, 1855: synonym of Cellana granostriata (Reeve, 1855)
- Patella granularis Linnaeus, 1758: synonym of Scutellastra granularis (Linnaeus, 1758)
- Patella grata Gould, 1859: synonym of Cellana grata (Gould, 1859)
- Patella grisea Risso, 1826: synonym of Patella caerulea Linnaeus, 1758
- Patella grisea de Blainville, 1825: synonym of Patella caerulea Linnaeus, 1758
- Patella guineensis Gmelin, 1791: synonym of Cymbula nigra (da Costa, 1771): synonym of Cymbula safiana (Lamarck, 1819)
- Patella guttata d'Orbigny, 1840: synonym of Patella piperata Gould, 1846
- Patella helena Turton, 1932: synonym of Helcion concolor (Krauss, 1848)
- Patella hellespontiana Monterosato, 1888: synonym of Patella caerulea Linnaeus, 1758
- Patella hepatica Prtichard & Gatliff, 1902: synonym of Patelloida victoriae (Gatliff & Gabriel, 1922)
- Patella hera Turton, 1932: synonym of Scutellastra barbara (Linnaeus, 1758)
- Patella hombroni Dautzenberg & Bouge, 1933: synonym of Cellana radiata orientalis (Pilsbry, 1891)
- Patella hypsilotera Locard, 1892: synonym of Patella vulgata Linnaeus, 1758
- Patella illuminata Gould, 1846: synonym of Cellana strigilis (Hombron & Jacquinot, 1841)
- Patella inconspicua Gray, 1843: synonym of Radiacmea inconspicua (Gray, 1843)
- Patella instabilis Gould, 1846: synonym of Lottia instabilis (Gould, 1846)
- Patella intermedia Murray in Knapp, 1857: synonym of Patella depressa Pennant, 1777
- Patella intorta Pennant, 1777: synonym of Ansates pellucida (Linnaeus, 1758): synonym of Patella pellucida Linnaeus, 1758
- Patella jamaicensis Gmelin, 1791: synonym of Lottia jamaicensis (Gmelin, 1791)
- Patella karachiensis Winckworth, 1930: synonym of Cellana rota (Gmelin, 1791)
- Patella kermadecensis Pilsbry, 1894: synonym of Scutellastra kermadecensis (Pilsbry, 1894)
- Patella kraussii Dunker, 1853: synonym of Cymbula nigra (da Costa, 1771): synonym of Cymbula safiana (Lamarck, 1819)
- Patella laciniosa Linnaeus, 1758: synonym of Siphonaria laciniosa (Linnaeus, 1758)
- Patella lacunosa Reeve, 1855: synonym of Scutellastra tabularis (Krauss, 1848)
- Patella lacustris Linnaeus, 1758: synonym of Acroloxus lacustris (Linnaeus, 1758)
- Patella laevigata Gmelin, 1791: synonym of Patella depressa Pennant, 1777
- Patella laevis Pennant, 1777: synonym of Patella pellucida Linnaeus, 1758
- Patella lamarckii Payraudeau, 1826: synonym of Patella ferruginea Gmelin, 1791
- Patella lamellata Röding, 1798: synonym of Scutellastra barbara (Linnaeus, 1758)
- Patella lampedusensis de Gregorio, 1884: synonym of Patella ferruginea Gmelin, 1791
- Patella laterocompressa de Rayneval & Ponzi, 1854: synonym of Lepetella laterocompressa (de Rayneval & Ponzi, 1854)
- Patella laticostata Blainville, 1825: synonym of Scutellastra laticostata (Blainville, 1825)
- Patella lepas Gmelin, 1791: synonym of Concholepas concholepas (Bruguière, 1789)
- Patella leucopleura Gmelin, 1791: synonym of Lottia leucopleura (Gmelin, 1791)
- Patella limatula Carpenter, 1864: synonym of Lottia limatula (Carpenter, 1864)
- Patella listeri Monterosato, 1888: synonym of Patella ulyssiponensis Gmelin, 1791
- Patella livescens Reeve, 1855: synonym of Cellana livescens (Reeve, 1855)
- Patella longicosta Lamarck, 1819: synonym of Scutellastra longicosta (Lamarck, 1819)
- Patella lowei d'Orbigny, 1839: synonym of Patella ulyssiponensis Gmelin, 1791
- Patella lusitanica Gmelin, 1791: synonym of Patella rustica Linnaeus, 1758
- Patella luteola Lamarck, 1819: synonym of Patella ferruginea Gmelin, 1791
- Patella mabillei Locard, 1892: synonym of Patella depressa Pennant, 1777
- Patella macroschisma Lightfoot, 1786: synonym of Macroschisma macroschisma (Lightfoot, 1786)
- Patella magellanica Gmelin, 1791: synonym of Nacella magellanica (Gmelin, 1791)
- Patella mamillata Risso, 1826: synonym of Trimusculus mammillaris (Linnaeus, 1758)
- Patella mammilaris Linnaeus, 1758: synonym of Trimusculus mammillaris (Linnaeus, 1758)
- Patella mammillaris Linnaeus, 1758: synonym of Trimusculus mammillaris (Linnaeus, 1758)
- Patella margaritacea Gmelin, 1791: synonym of Patella caerulea Linnaeus, 1758
- Patella mazatlandica G. B. Sowerby I, 1839: synonym of Cellana mazatlandica (G. B. Sowerby I, 1839)
- Patella medusa Röding, 1798: synonym of Patella ferruginea Gmelin, 1791
- Patella mexicana Broderip, W.J. & G.B. I Sowerby, 1829: synonym of Scutellastra mexicana (Broderip & G. B. Sowerby I, 1829)
- Patella micans Röding, 1798: synonym of Cellana cylindrica (Gmelin, 1791)
- Patella militaris Linnaeus, 1771: synonym of Capulus ungaricus (Linnaeus, 1758)
- Patella miniata Born, 1778 and Patella sanguinans Reeve, 1854 are synonyms for Cymbula miniata (Born, 1778)
- Patella moreleti Drouet, 1858: synonym of Scutellastra flexuosa (Quoy & Gaimard, 1834)
- Patella moreli Deshayes, 1863: synonym of Scutellastra flexuosa (Quoy & Gaimard, 1834)
- Patella morio Noodt, 1819: synonym of Cellana radians (Gmelin, 1791)
- Patella muricata Brocchi, 1814: synonym of Calyptraea chinensis (Linnaeus, 1758)
- Patella mytiliformis Schroeter, 1786: synonym of Ansates pellucida (Linnaeus, 1758): synonym of Patella pellucida Linnaeus, 1758
- Patella mytilina Helbling, 1779: synonym of Nacella mytilina (Helbling, 1779)
- Patella nacrina de Gregorio, 1884: synonym of Patella caerulea Linnaeus, 1758
- Patella natalensis Krauss, 1848: synonym of Scutellastra natalensis (F. Krauss, 1848)
- Patella nigra da Costa, 1771 and Patella safiana Lamarck, 1819 are synonyms for Cymbula nigra (da Costa, 1771)
- Patella nigrisquamata Reeve, 1854: synonym of Cellana mazatlandica (G. B. Sowerby I, 1839)
- Patella nigrolineata Reeve, 1854: synonym of Cellana nigrolineata (Reeve, 1854)
- Patella nigropunctata Reeve, 1854: synonym of Patella rustica Linnaeus, 1758
- Patella nigrosquamosa Dunker, 1846: synonym of Patella piperata Gould, 1846
- Patella noachina Linnaeus, 1771: synonym of Puncturella noachina (Linnaeus, 1771)
- Patella notata Linnaeus, 1758: synonym of Clypidina notata (Linnaeus, 1785)
- Patella novemradiata Quoy & Gaimard, 1834: synonym of Cellana livescens (Reeve, 1855)
- Patella nubecula Linnaeus, 1758: synonym of Fissurella nubecula (Linnaeus, 1758)
- Patella nympha Turton, 1932: synonym of Scutellastra barbara (Linnaeus, 1758)
- Patella obtecta Krauss, 1848: synonym of Scutellastra obtecta (Krauss, 1848)
- Patella octoradiata Gmelin, 1791: synonym of Hemitoma octoradiata (Gmelin, 1791)
- Patella octoradiata Hutton, 1873: synonym of Scutellastra chapmani (Tenison-Woods, 1875)
- Patella oculus Born, 1778: synonym of Cymbula oculus (Born, 1778)
- Patella oculuscati Noodt, 1819: synonym of Scutellastra granularis (Linnaeus, 1758)
- Patella oculushirci da Costa, 1771: synonym of Cymbula oculus (Born, 1778)
- Patella ombracula Blainville, 1819: synonym of Umbraculum umbraculum (Lightfoot, 1786)
- Patella opea Reeve, 1855: synonym of Lottia antillarum G. B. Sowerby I, 1834
- Patella orbignyana Nordsieck & Talavera, 1979: synonym of Patella ulyssiponensis Gmelin, 1791
- Patella pallida Gould, 1859: synonym of Niveotectura pallida (Gould, 1859)
- Patella parasitica (Orbigny, 1841): synonym of Scurria variabilis (G. B. Sowerby I, 1839)
- Patella parva Montagu, 1803: synonym of Tectura virginea (O.F. Müller, 1776)
- Patella patriarcha Pilsbry, 1891: synonym of Scutellastra tabularis (Krauss, 1848)
- Patella paulinoi Locard, 1894: synonym of Patella ulyssiponensis Gmelin, 1791
- Patella paumotensis Gould, 1846: synonym of Scutellastra flexuosa (Quoy & Gaimard, 1834)
- Patella pectinata Born, 1780: synonym of Siphonaria pectinata (Linnaeus, 1758)
- Patella penicillata (Reeve, 1855): synonym of Scurria variabilis (G. B. Sowerby I, 1839)
- Patella peronii Blainville, 1825: synonym of Scutellastra peronii (Blainville, 1825)
- Patella perversa Gmelin, 1791: synonym of Tylodina perversa (Gmelin, 1791)
- Patella pharaonis Jousseaume, 1888: synonym of Cellana rota (Gmelin, 1791)
- Patella pica Reeve, 1854: synonym of Scutellastra exusta (Reeve, 1854)
- Patella picta Gmelin, 1791: synonym of Fissurella picta (Gmelin, 1791)
- Patella plicaria Gmelin, 1791: synonym of Scutellastra barbara (Linnaeus, 1758)
- Patella plicata Born, 1778: synonym of Scutellastra barbara (Linnaeus, 1758)
- Patella plumbea Lamarck, 1819: synonym of Cymbula safiana (Lamarck, 1819)
- Patella polaris Hombron & Jacquinot, 1841: synonym of Nacella polaris (Hombron & Jacquinot, 1841)
- Patella poli Scacchi, 1832: synonym of Calyptraea chinensis (Linnaeus, 1758)
- Patella polita Risso, 1826: synonym of Patella rustica Linnaeus, 1758
- Patella pontica Valenciennes in Monterosato, 1888: synonym of Patella ulyssiponensis Gmelin, 1791
- Patella pontica Milaschewitsch, 1914: synonym of Patella ulyssiponensis Gmelin, 1791
- Patella porcellana Linnaeus, 1758: synonym of Septaria porcellana (Linnaeus, 1758)
- Patella pottsi Hutton, 1873: synonym of Cellana strigilis (Hombron & Jacquinot, 1841)
- Patella profunda Deshayes, 1863: synonym of Eoacmaea profunda (Deshayes, 1863)
- Patella pulchella Forbes, 1835: synonym of Tectura virginea (O. F. Müller, 1776)
- Patella pulcherrima Krebs, 1864: synonym of Lottia antillarum G. B. Sowerby I, 1834
- Patella punctata Lamarck, 1819: synonym of Patella rustica Linnaeus, 1758
- Patella punctulata Gmelin, 1791: synonym of Patella rustica Linnaeus, 1758
- Patella puncturata Lamarck, 1819: synonym of Eoacmaea pustulata (Helbling, 1779)
- Patella pustulata Helbling, 1779: synonym of Eoacmaea pustulata (Helbling, 1779)
- Patella pyramidata Lamarck, 1819: synonym of Patella ferruginea Gmelin, 1791
- Patella pyriformis da Costa, 1771: synonym of Scutellastra cochlear (Born, 1778)
- Patella radiata Born, 1778: synonym of Cellana radiata (Born, 1778)
- Patella radiata Perry, 1811: synonym of Patella vulgata Linnaeus, 1758
- Patella redimiculum Reeve, 1854: synonym of Cellana strigilis (Hombron & Jacquinot, 1841)
- Patella repanda Gmelin, 1791: synonym of Patella ulyssiponensis Gmelin, 1791
- Patella reticulata Donovan, 1803: synonym of Diodora graeca (Linnaeus, 1758)
- Patella richelmia Risso, 1826: synonym of Patella caerulea Linnaeus, 1758
- Patella rietensis Turton, 1932: synonym of Helcion concolor (Krauss, 1848)
- Patella riparia Nardo, 1847: synonym of Patella caerulea Linnaeus, 1758
- Patella rosea Gmelin, 1791: synonym of Fissurella nubecula (Linnaeus, 1758)
- Patella rota Gmelin, 1791: synonym of Cellana rota (Gmelin, 1791)
- Patella rouxii Payraudeau, 1826: synonym of Patella ferruginea Gmelin, 1791
- Patella rubella O. Fabricius, 1780: synonym of Erginus rubellus (O. Fabricius, 1780)
- Patella rudis Röding, 1798: synonym of Fissurella nodosa (Born, 1778)
- Patella safiana Lamarck, 1819: synonym of Cymbula safiana (Lamarck, 1819)
- Patella sagittata Gould, 1846: synonym of Cellana vitiensis Powell, 1973
- Patella sanguinans Reeve, 1854: synonym of Cymbula sanguinans (Reeve, 1854)
- Patella scapula Martyn, 1786: synonym of Dolabella auricularia (Lightfoot, 1786)
- Patella schrenckii Lischke, 1868: synonym of Nipponacmea schrenckii (Lischke, 1868)
- Patella scissa Salis Marschlins, 1793: synonym of Emarginula huzardii Payraudeau, 1826
- Patella scurra Lesson, 1831: synonym of Scurria scurra (Lesson, 1831)
- Patella scutellina Locard, 1892: synonym of Patella caerulea Linnaeus, 1758
- Patella scutellum Gmelin, 1791: synonym of Amblychilepas scutella [sic]: synonym of Dendrofissurella scutellum (Gmelin, 1791)
- Patella septemradiata Fischer von Waldheim, 1807: synonym of Cymbula granatina (Linnaeus, 1758)
- Patella serrata Fischer von Waldheim, 1807: synonym of Siphonaria serrata (Fischer von Waldheim, 1807)
- Patella silicina Röding, 1798: synonym of Patella caerulea Linnaeus, 1758
- Patella sinensis Gmelin, 1791: synonym of Calyptraea chinensis (Linnaeus, 1758)
- Patella sinica Gmelin, 1791: synonym of Umbraculum sinicum (Gmelin, 1791): synonym of Umbraculum umbraculum (Lightfoot, 1786)
- Patella sowerbyi Turton, 1932: synonym of Scutellastra barbara (Linnaeus, 1758)
- Patella spectabilis Dunker, 1853: synonym of Patella ulyssiponensis Gmelin, 1791
- Patella spinetum Röding, 1798: synonym of Scutellastra barbara (Linnaeus, 1758)
- Patella spinifera Lamarck, 1819: synonym of Scutellastra barbara (Linnaeus, 1758)
- Patella spinosa Fischer von Waldheim, 1807: synonym of Scutellastra barbara (Linnaeus, 1758)
- Patella spinosula Meuschen, 1787: synonym of Patella ulyssiponensis Gmelin, 1791
- Patella spinulosa Mörch, 1853: synonym of Patella ulyssiponensis Gmelin, 1791
- Patella squama de Blainville, 1825: synonym of Patella caerulea Linnaeus, 1758
- Patella squama Gmelin, 1791: synonym of Monia squama (Gmelin, 1791)
- Patella squamata Röding, 1798: synonym of Patella rustica Linnaeus, 1758
- Patella squamata Gmelin, 1791: synonym of Cymbula nigra (da Costa, 1771): synonym of Cymbula safiana (Lamarck, 1819)
- Patella stella Risso, 1826: synonym of Patella ferruginea Gmelin, 1791
- Patella stellaeformis Reeve, 1842: synonym of Scutellastra flexuosa (Quoy & Gaimard, 1834)
- Patella stellifera Gmelin, 1791: synonym of Cellana stellifera (Gmelin, 1791)
- Patella stellularia Quoy & Gaimard, 1834: synonym of Cellana stellifera (Gmelin, 1791)
- Patella strigilis Hombron & Jacquinot, 1841: synonym of Cellana strigilis (Hombron & Jacquinot, 1841)
- Patella subgranularis de Blainville, 1825: synonym of Patella rustica Linnaeus, 1758
- Patella subplana Potiez & Michaud, 1838: synonym of Patella caerulea Linnaeus, 1758
- Patella tabularis Krauss, 1848: synonym of Scutellastra tabularis (Krauss, 1848)
- Patella tahitica Curtiss, 1938: synonym of Cellana taitensis (Röding, 1798)
- Patella tara Prashad & Rao, 1934: synonym of Scutellastra flexuosa (Quoy & Gaimard, 1834)
- Patella tarentina Salis Marschlins, 1793: synonym of Patella ulyssiponensis Gmelin, 1791
- Patella taslei Mabille, 1888: synonym of Patella depressa Pennant, 1777
- Patella teneriffae Mabille, 1888: synonym of Patella ulyssiponensis Gmelin, 1791
- Patella tessellata Hombron & Jacquinot, 1841: synonym of Cellana radiata orientalis (Pilsbry, 1891)
- Patella tessulata O. F. Müller, 1776: synonym of Testudinalia testudinalis (O. F. Müller, 1776)
- Patella testudinalis O. F. Müller, 1776: synonym of Testudinalia testudinalis (O. F. Müller, 1776)
- Patella testudinaria Linnaeus, 1758: synonym of Cellana testudinaria (Linnaeus, 1758)
- Patella thetis Turton, 1932: synonym of Scutellastra barbara (Linnaeus, 1758)
- Patella toreuma Reeve, 1854: synonym of Cellana toreuma (Reeve, 1854)
- Patella tricarinata Linnaeus, 1767: synonym of Amathina tricarinata (Linnaeus, 1767)
- Patella tricornis Turton, 1819: synonym of Pomatoceros triqueter (Linnaeus, 1758): synonym of Spirobranchus triqueter (Linnaeus, 1758)
- Patella trigona Gmelin, 1791: synonym of Pilosabia trigona (Gmelin, 1791)
- Patella tucopiana: synonym of Scutellastra tucopiana Powell, 1925
- Patella turtonia Risso, 1826: synonym of Patella ferruginea Gmelin, 1791
- Patella umbraculum Lightfoot, 1786: synonym of Umbraculum umbraculum (Lightfoot, 1786)
- Patella umbrellata Delle Chiaje, 1830: synonym of Umbraculum umbraculum (Lightfoot, 1786)
- Patella undulata Röding, 1798: synonym of Cheilea undulata (Röding, 1798)
- Patella ungarica Linnaeus, 1758: synonym of Capulus ungaricus (Linnaeus, 1758)
- Patella unguis Linnaeus, 1758: synonym of Scutus unguis (Linnaeus, 1758)
- Patella variabilis (Reeve, 1855): synonym of Scurria variabilis (G. B. Sowerby I, 1839)
- Patella variabilis Krauss, 1848: synonym of Helcion concolor (Krauss, 1848)
- Patella variabilis Krauss, 1848: invalid: junior homonym of Patella variabilis Röding, 1798, and Patella variabilis Risso, 1826; Patella fischeri is an unnecessary replacement name)
- Patella variabilis Risso, 1826: synonym of Patella rustica Linnaeus, 1758
- Patella variegata Reeve, 1842: synonym of Cellana rota (Gmelin, 1791)
- Patella variegata Reeve, 1854: synonym of Cellana eucosmia (Pilsbry, 1892)
- Patella vespertina Risso, 1826: synonym of Patella ferruginea Gmelin, 1791
- Patella victoriae Gatliff & Gabriel, 1922: synonym of Patelloida victoriae (Gatliff & Gabriel, 1922)
- Patella virgata Gmelin, 1791: synonym of Cellana radiata (Born, 1778)
- Patella virginea O. F. Müller, 1776: synonym of Tectura virginea (O. F. Müller, 1776)
- Patella viridula (Lamarck, 1819): synonym of Scurria viridula (Lamarck, 1822)
- Patella whitechurchi Turton, 1932: synonym of Scutellastra barbara (Linnaeus, 1758)
- Patella zebrina Lesson, 1831: synonym of Scurria zebrina (Lesson, 1831)

== See also ==
- Limpet
