= Patella (disambiguation) =

The patella is the kneecap bone.

Patella may also refer to:

- Patella, a segment of the arthropod leg
- Patella (gastropod), a genus of limpets in the family Patellidae
