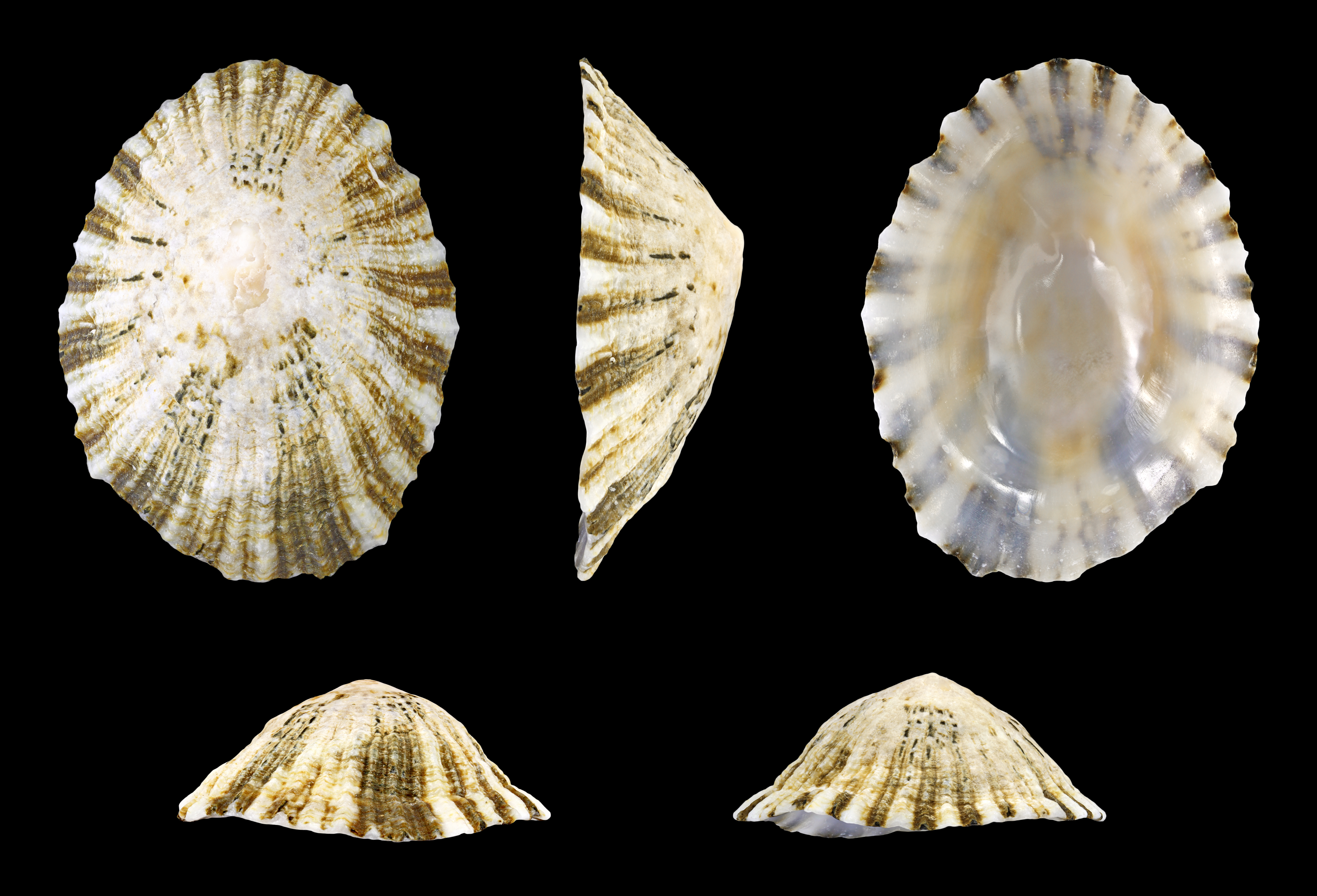
- A shell of Patella depressa

Scientific classification
- Kingdom: Animalia
- Phylum: Mollusca
- Class: Gastropoda
- Subclass: Patellogastropoda
- Family: Patellidae
- Genus: Patella
- Species: P. depressa

Binomial name
- Patella depressa Pennant, 1777

Synonyms
- Patella auricola da Costa, 1771 (dubious synonym); Patella electrina Reeve, 1854; Patella goudoti Mabille, 1888; Patella intermedia Murray in Knapp, 1857 (junior synonym); Patella laevigata Gmelin, 1791 (dubious synonym); Patella mabillei Locard, 1892; Patella plumbea vatheleti Pilsbry, 1891; Patella taslei Mabille, 1888; Patella vulgata var. debilis Pallary, 1920; Patella vulgata var. picta Jeffreys, 1865

= Patella depressa =

Species of gastropod

Patella depressa is a species of sea snail, a true limpet, a marine gastropod mollusk in the family Patellidae, one of the families of true limpets.

Patella depressa is a nomen dubium according to Christiaens (1973, 1983); Patella intermedia gets priority. Nevertheless, the name Patella depressa is in usage among British authors (e.g. Graham, 1988) and is assumed as valid.

== Description ==
The length of the shell attains 40.2 mm.

== Distribution ==
This marine species occurs off Morocco.

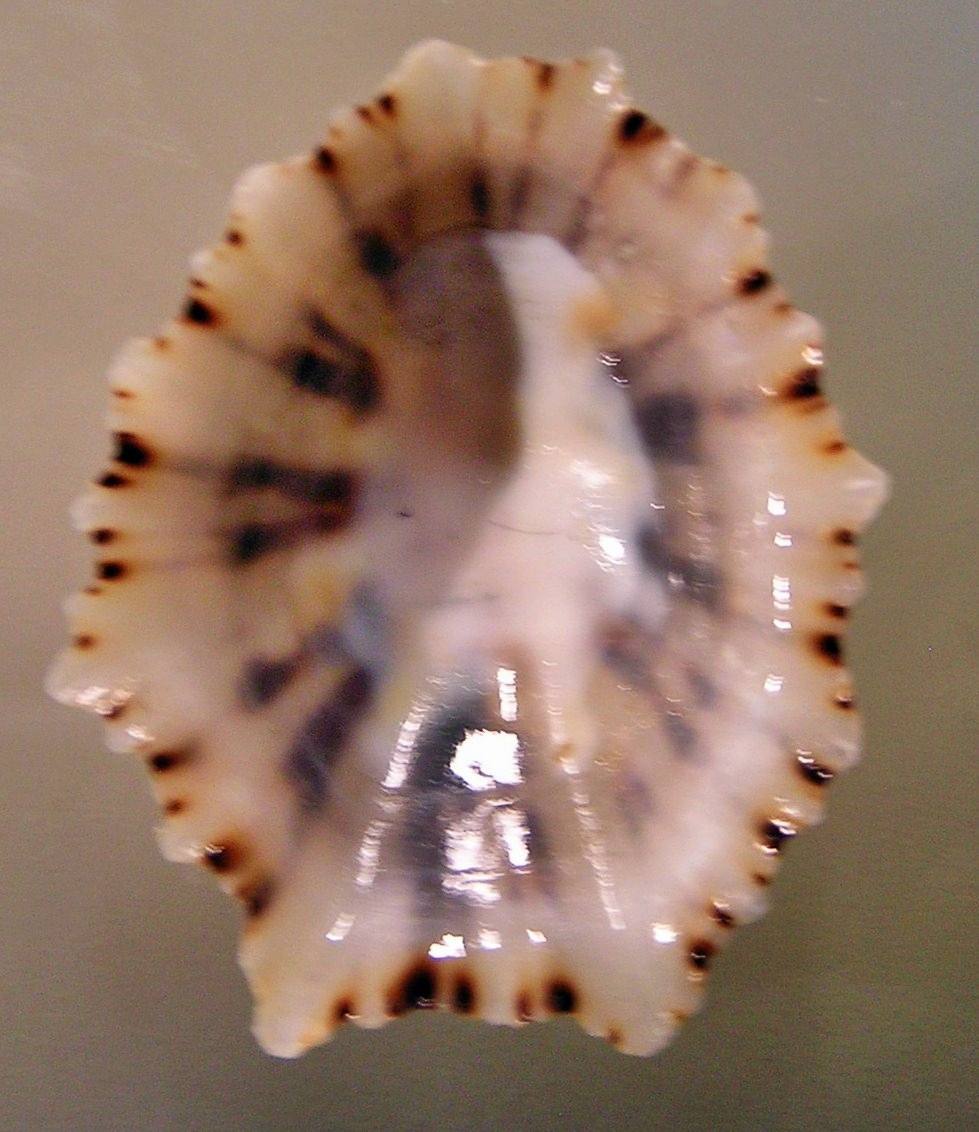
Patella depressa, ventral view
