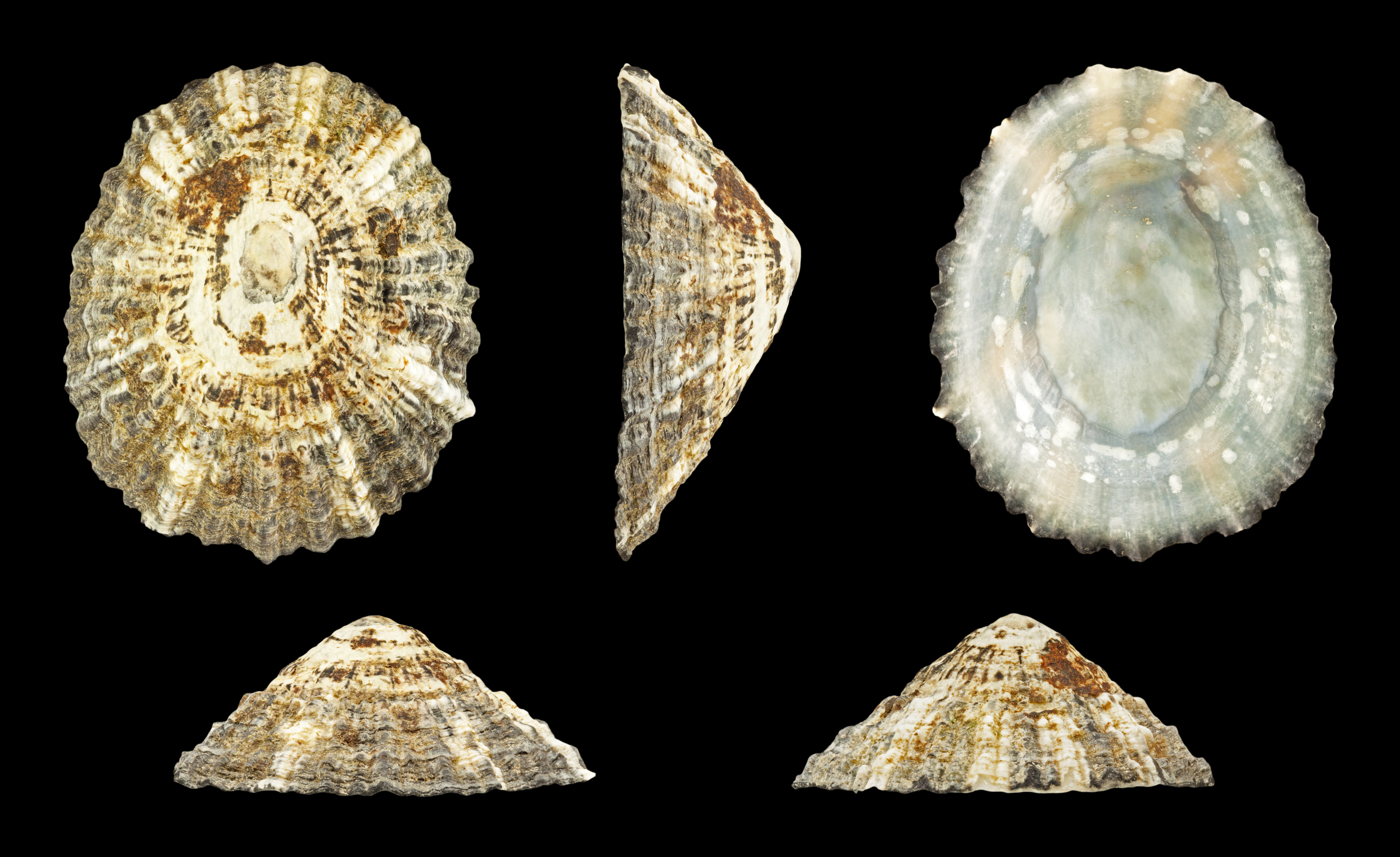
- Patella lugubris

Scientific classification
- Kingdom: Animalia
- Phylum: Mollusca
- Class: Gastropoda
- Subclass: Patellogastropoda
- Family: Patellidae
- Genus: Patella
- Species: P. lugubris

Binomial name
- Patella lugubris Gmelin, 1791

Synonyms
- Patella nidulina Locard, 1898; Patella nidulina var. rufescens Locard, 1898

= Patella lugubris =

Species of gastropod

Patella lugubris is a species of sea snail, a true limpet, a marine gastropod mollusk in the family Patellidae, one of the families of true limpets. Patella lugubris is one of the nine recognized species in this genus.

== Description ==
The length of the shell attains 50.4 mm.

Genetic evidence indicates that Patella lugubris is closely related to Patella candei. P candei is paraphyletic with respect to P. lugubris, meaning the that currently recognized P. candei does not represent a single natural evolutionary lineage unless P. lugubris is included. This pattern suggest that the taxonomy of these species requires revision.

== Distribution ==
This species occurs in the Atlantic Ocean off Cape Verde and the Azores, making it one of only two Patella species that are found in the Macaronesian Islands.
