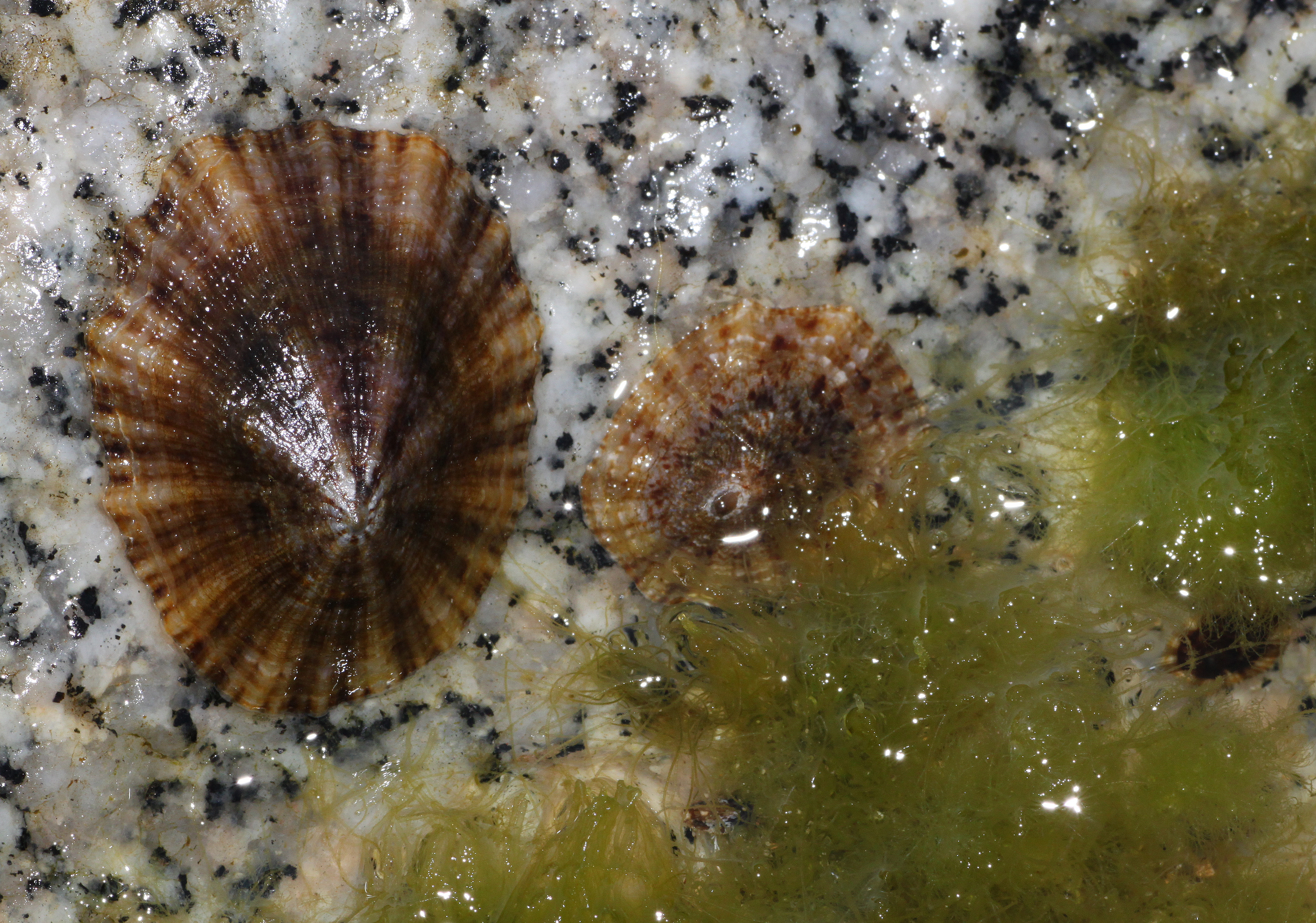

Scientific classification
- Kingdom: Animalia
- Phylum: Mollusca
- Class: Gastropoda
- Subclass: Patellogastropoda
- Family: Patellidae
- Genus: Patella
- Species: P. caerulea

Binomial name
- Patella caerulea Linnaeus, 1758

Synonyms
- Patella alba da Costa, 1771; Patella alba Anton, 1838; Patella calicula Li Chang, 1930; Patella cancellata Risso, 1826; Patella favaniana Risso, 1826; Patella fragilis Philippi, 1836; Patella grisea Risso, 1826; Patella grisea de Blainville, 1825; Patella hellespontiana Monterosato, 1888; Patella margaritacea Gmelin, 1791; Patella nacrina de Gregorio, 1884; Patella richelmia Risso, 1826; Patella riparia Nardo, 1847; Patella scutellina Locard, 1892; Patella silicina Röding, 1798; Patella squama de Blainville, 1825; Patella subplana Potiez & Michaud, 1838; Patella vulgata var. plumbea Röding, 1798

= Patella caerulea =

Species of gastropod

Patella caerulea, is a species of limpet in the family Patellidae. It is known by the common names Mediterranean limpet and rayed Mediterranean limpet. It is native to the Mediterranean Sea.

== Description ==
The size of the shell varies between 20 mm and 72 mm.

The thin shell is depressed, spreading, usually more or less distinctly 6 or 7 angled. The riblets are rather fine and notably unequal.

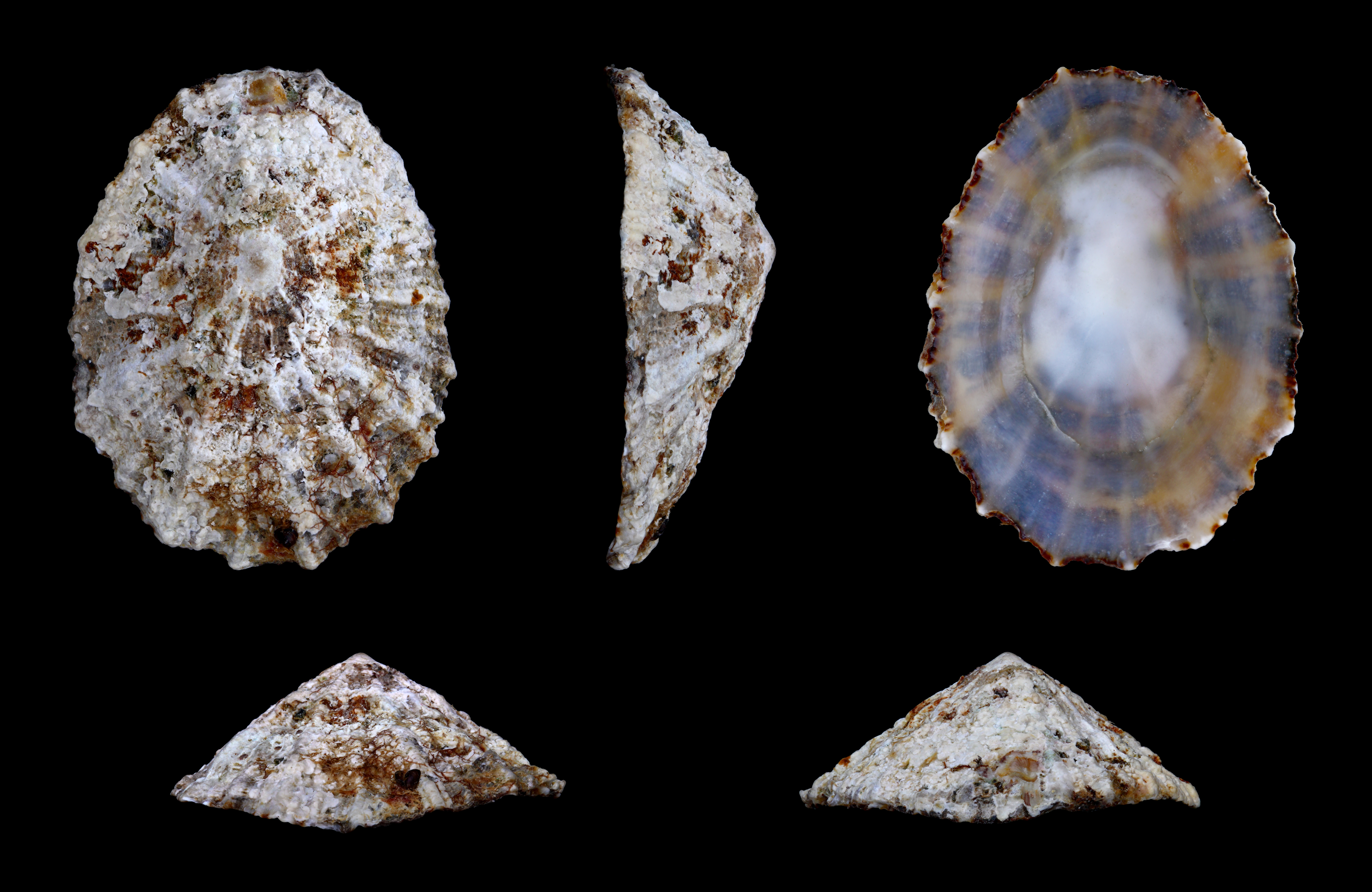
Patella caerulea

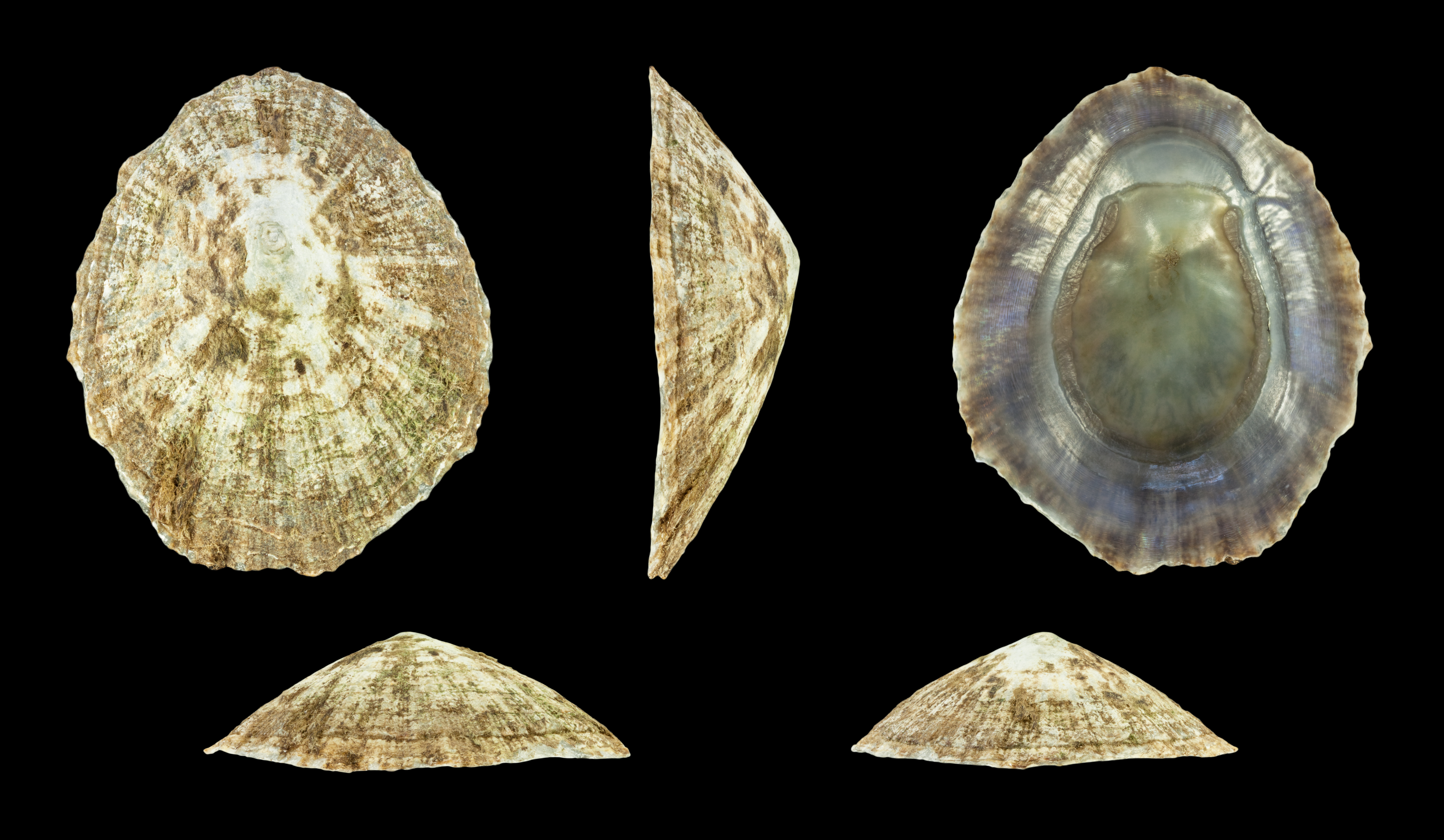
Patella caerulea f. fragilis

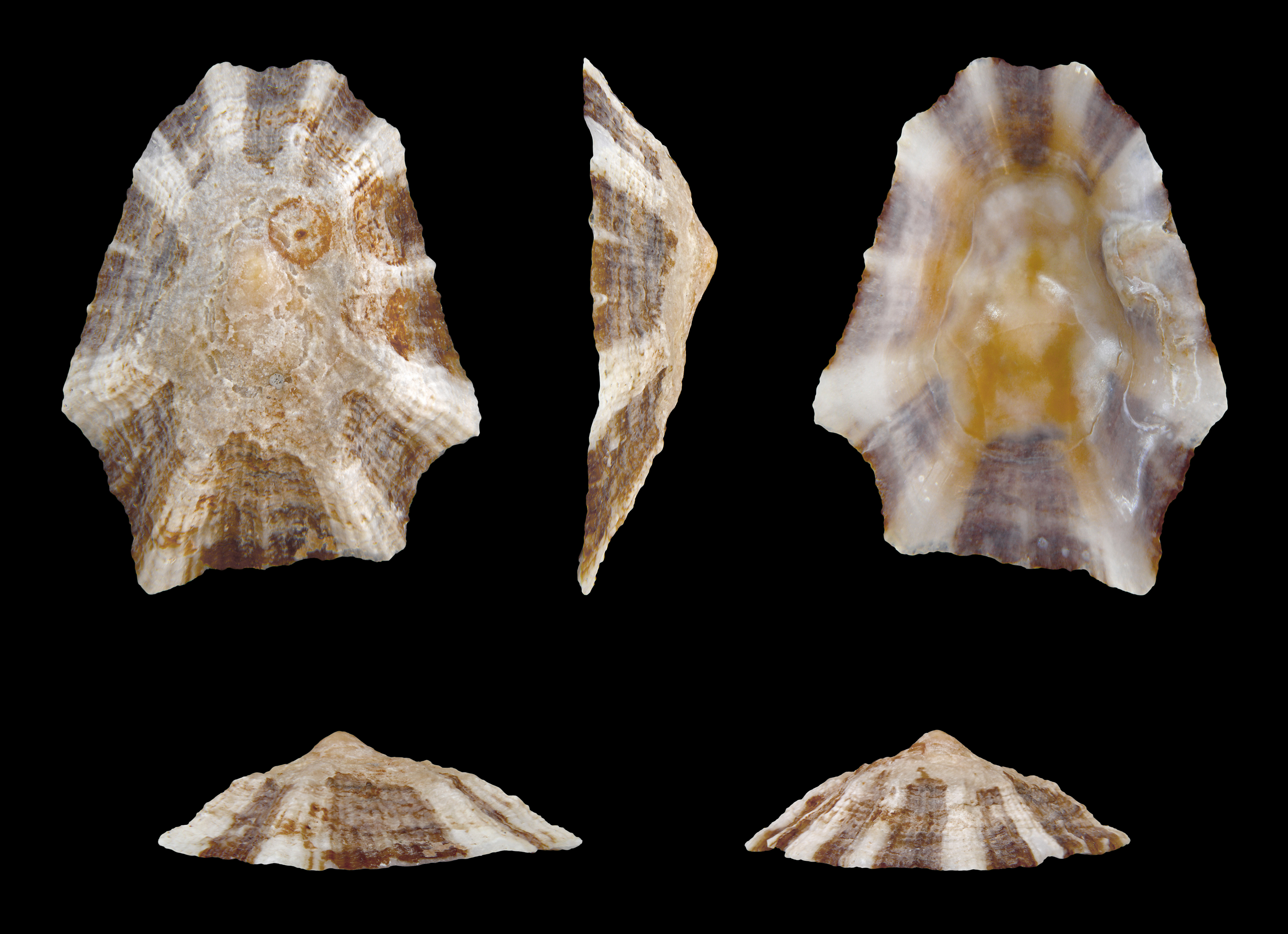
Patella caerulea f. stellata

== Distribution ==
This species occurs in the Mediterranean Sea; in the Atlantic Ocean off the Canary Islands, Madeira and the Azores.
