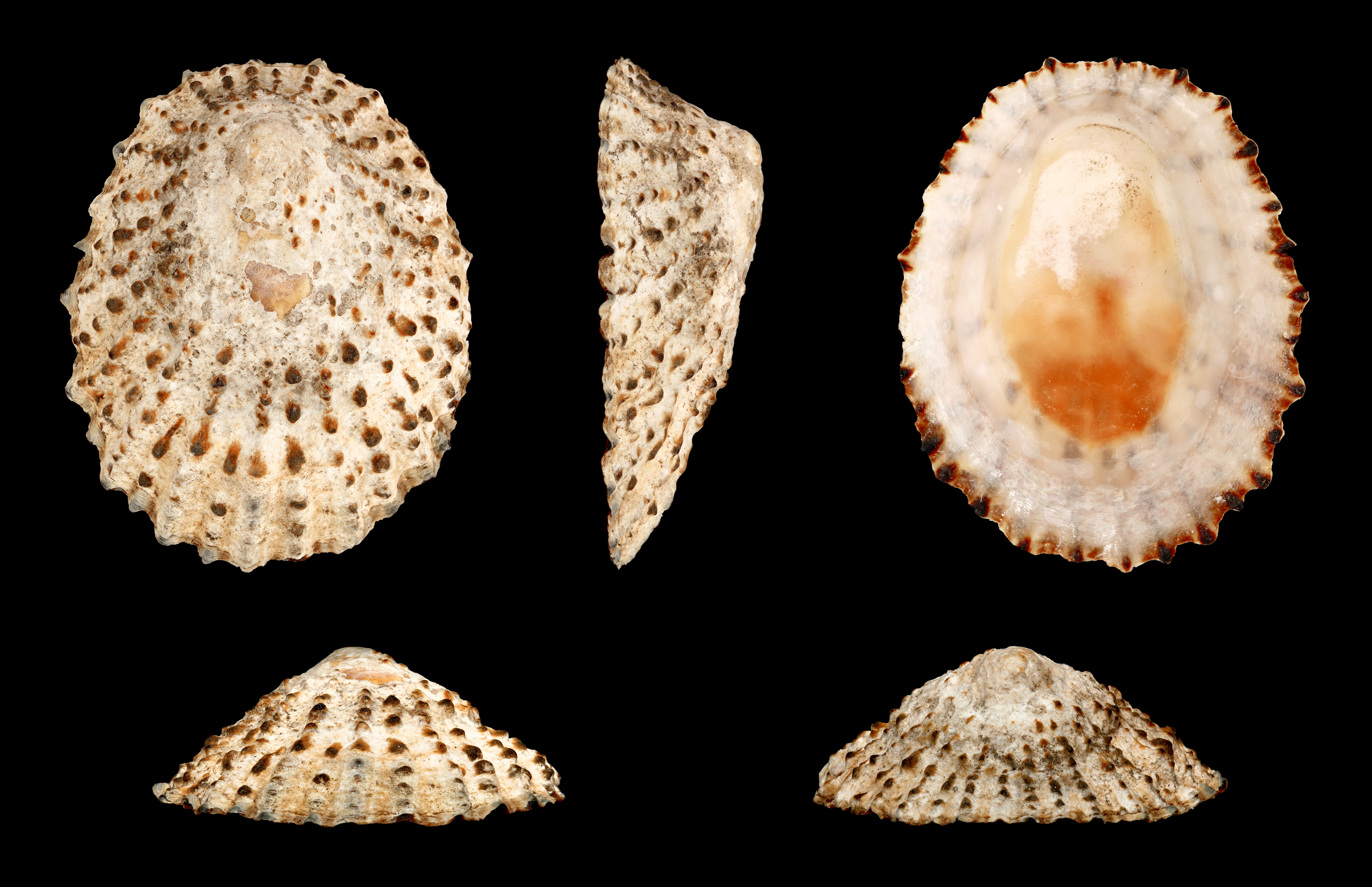
- Five views of a shell of Patella piperata

Scientific classification
- Kingdom: Animalia
- Phylum: Mollusca
- Class: Gastropoda
- Subclass: Patellogastropoda
- Family: Patellidae
- Genus: Patella
- Species: P. piperata

Binomial name
- Patella piperata Gould, 1846

Synonyms
- Patella fraunfeldi Dunker, 1866; Patella guttata d'Orbigny, 1840; Patella nigrosquamosa Dunker, 1846

= Patella piperata =

Species of gastropod

Patella piperata is a species of sea snail, a true limpet, a marine gastropod mollusc in the family Patellidae, one of the families of true limpets.

A 2006 study in National Library of Medicine showed alarming traces of metal contamination.
