= Patella swakopmundensis =

Scientific classification
- Kingdom: Animalia
- Phylum: Mollusca
- Class: Gastropoda
- Subclass: Patellogastropoda
- Family: Patellidae
- Genus: Patella
- Species: P. swakopmundensis

Binomial name
- Patella swakopmundensis Massier, 2009

Species of gastropod

Patella swakopmundensis is a species of sea snail, a true limpet, a marine gastropod mollusk in the family Patellidae, one of the families of true limpets.
