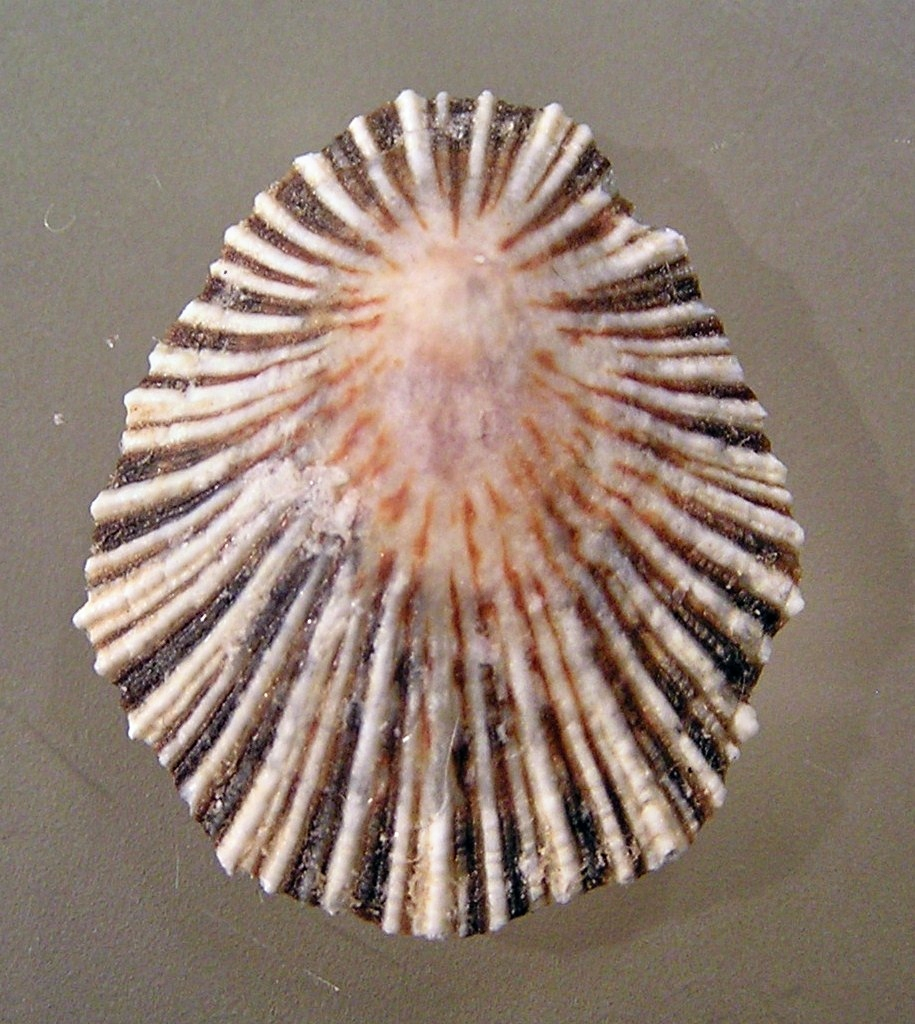
- Patella variabilis polygramma

Scientific classification
- Kingdom: Animalia
- Phylum: Mollusca
- Class: Gastropoda
- Subclass: Patellogastropoda
- Family: Patellidae
- Genus: Patella
- Species: P. variabilis

Binomial name
- Patella variabilis Krauss, 1848

Synonyms
- Patella concolor Krauss, 1848

= Patella variabilis =

Species of gastropod

Patella variabilis is a species of sea snail, a true limpet, a marine gastropod mollusk in the family Patellidae, one of the families of true limpets.

== Subspecies ==
- Patella (Patella) variabilis f. concolor Krauss, C.F., 1848
- Patella (Patella) variabilis f. constellata G.B. Sowerby I
- Patella (Patella) variabilis f. asciolata Tomlin, J.R. le B
- Patella (Patella) variabilis f. polygramma Tomlin, J.R. le B
