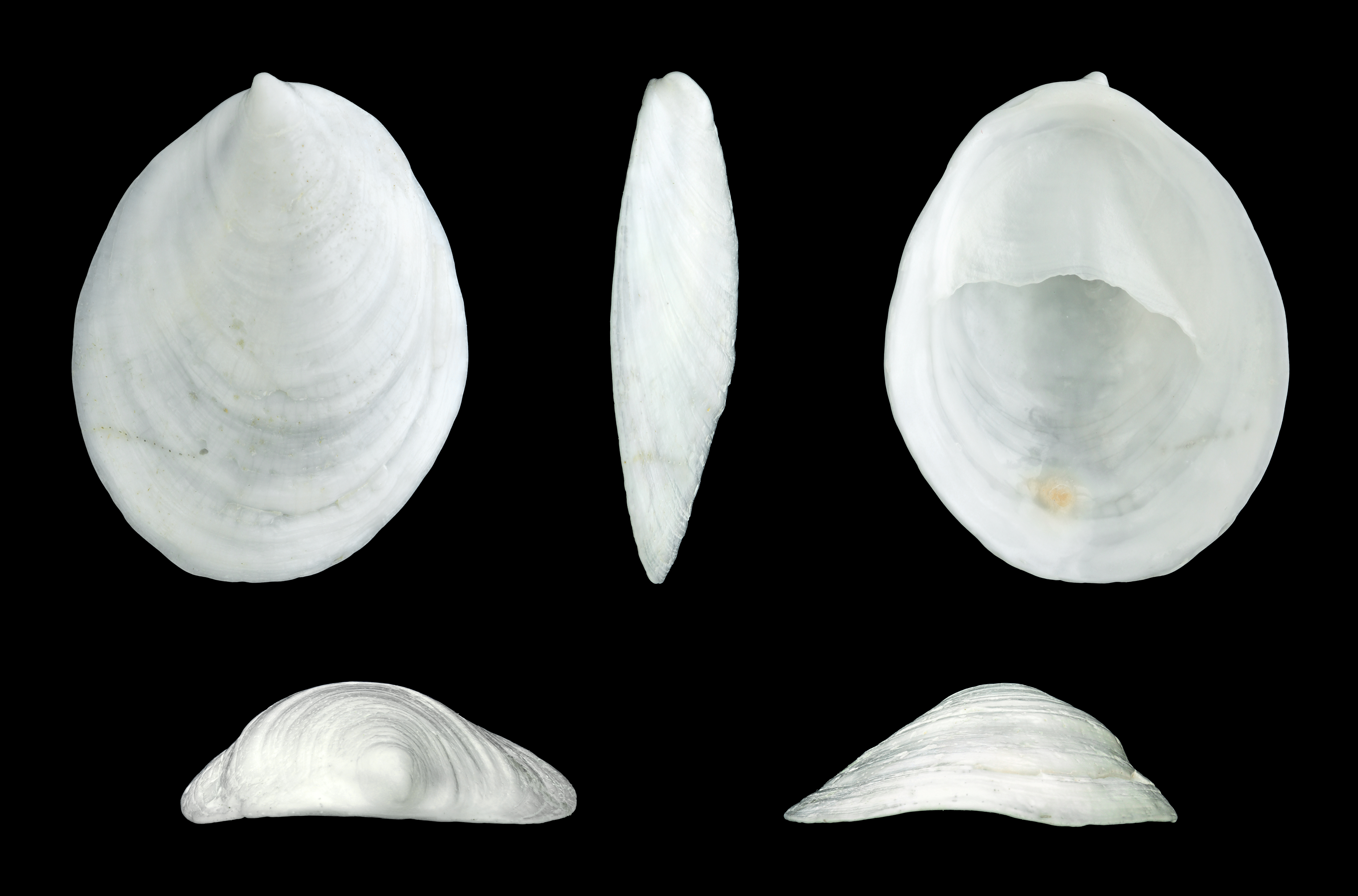

Scientific classification
- Kingdom: Animalia
- Phylum: Mollusca
- Class: Gastropoda
- Subclass: Caenogastropoda
- Order: Littorinimorpha
- Family: Calyptraeidae
- Genus: Crepidula
- Species: C. unguiformis

Binomial name
- Crepidula unguiformis Lamarck, 1822

= Crepidula unguiformis =

Species of gastropod

Crepidula unguiformis is a species of sea snail, a marine gastropod mollusk in the family Calyptraeidae, the slipper snails or slipper limpets, cup-and-saucer snails, and Chinese hat snails.
