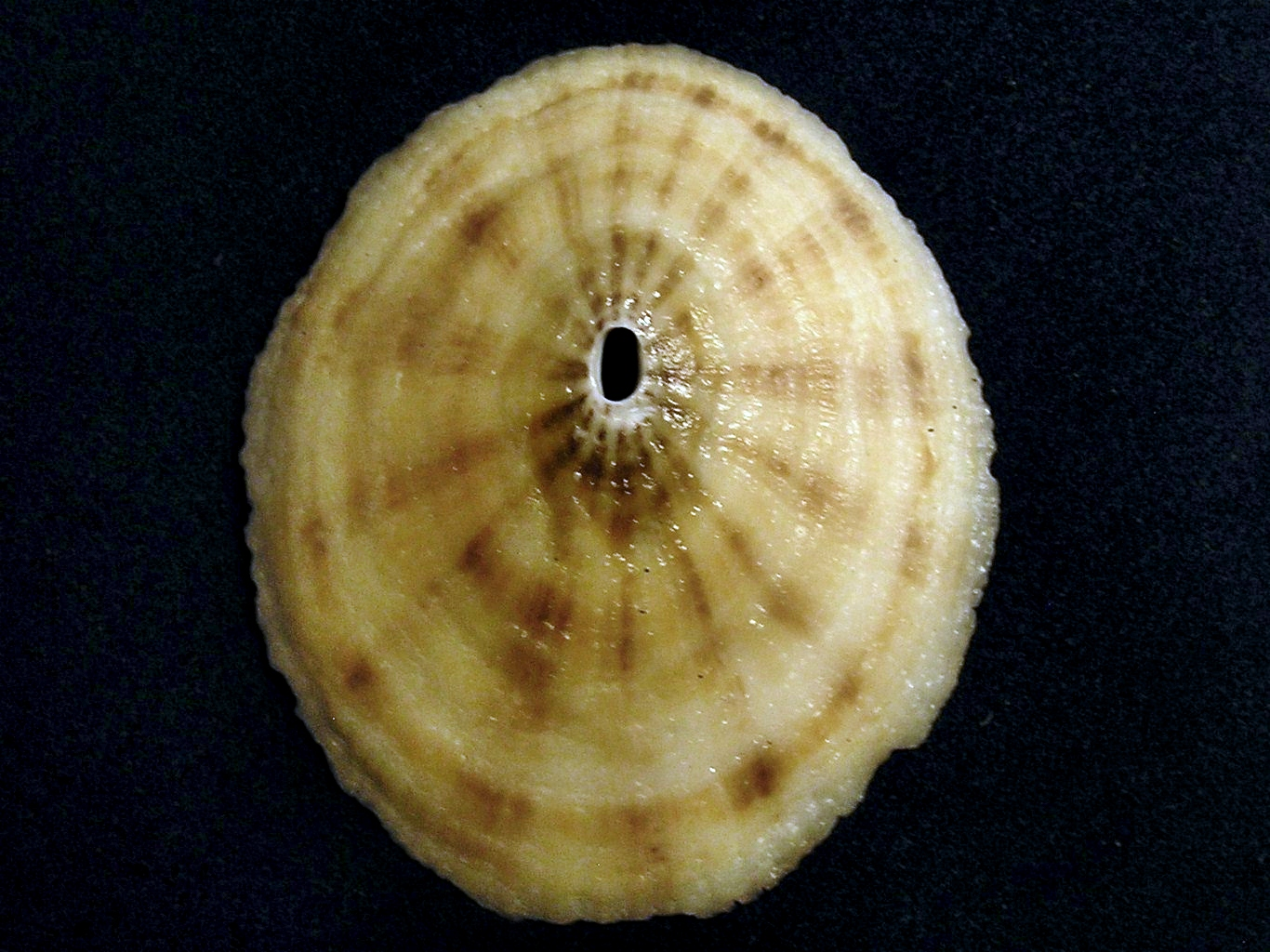
- Top view of a shell of Fissurella costata

Scientific classification
- Kingdom: Animalia
- Phylum: Mollusca
- Class: Gastropoda
- Subclass: Vetigastropoda
- Order: Lepetellida
- Family: Fissurellidae
- Genus: Fissurella
- Species: F. costata

Binomial name
- Fissurella costata Lesson, 1831

Synonyms
- Fissurella chilensis Sowerby I, 1835; Fissurella costata var. rubra Ziegenhorn & Thiem, 1925; Fissurella rudis Deshayes, 1830 (Invalid: junior secondary homonym of Patella rudis Röding, 1798)

= Fissurella costata =

Species of gastropod

Fissurella costata, common name : the costate keyhole limpet, is a species of sea snail, a marine gastropod mollusc in the family Fissurellidae, the keyhole limpets.

== Description ==
The size of an adult shell varies between 25 mm and 90 mm.

== Distribution ==
This species is present in the southeastern coast of Pacific Ocean off Peru and Chile. They live on the rocky intertidal substrate.
