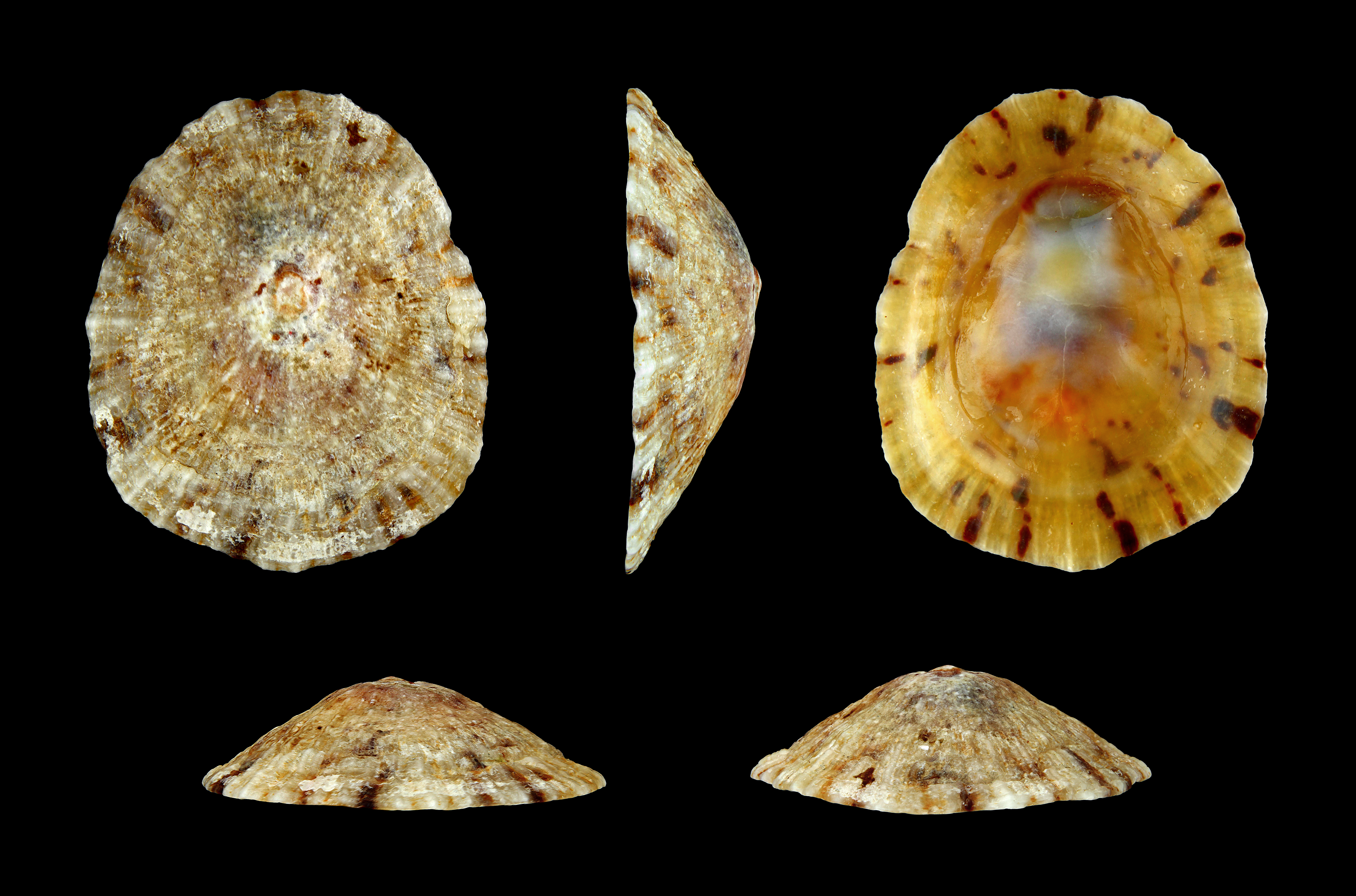
- Five views of a shell of Cellana rota

Scientific classification
- Kingdom: Animalia
- Phylum: Mollusca
- Class: Gastropoda
- Subclass: Patellogastropoda
- Family: Nacellidae
- Genus: Cellana
- Species: C. rota

Binomial name
- Cellana rota (Gmelin, 1791)

Synonyms
- Acmaea chathamensis Pilsbry, 1891; Helcioniscus rota (Gmelin, 1791); Patella aster Reeve, 1855; Patella karachiensis Winckworth, 1930; Patella pharaonis Jousseaume, 1888; Patella rota Gmelin, 1791 (original combination); Patella variegata Reeve, 1842 (invalid: junior homonym of Patella variegata Röding, 1798, and P. variegata Blainville, 1825)

= Cellana rota =

Species of gastropod

Cellana rota is a species of true limpet, a marine gastropod mollusc in the family Nacellidae, one of the families of true limpets.
