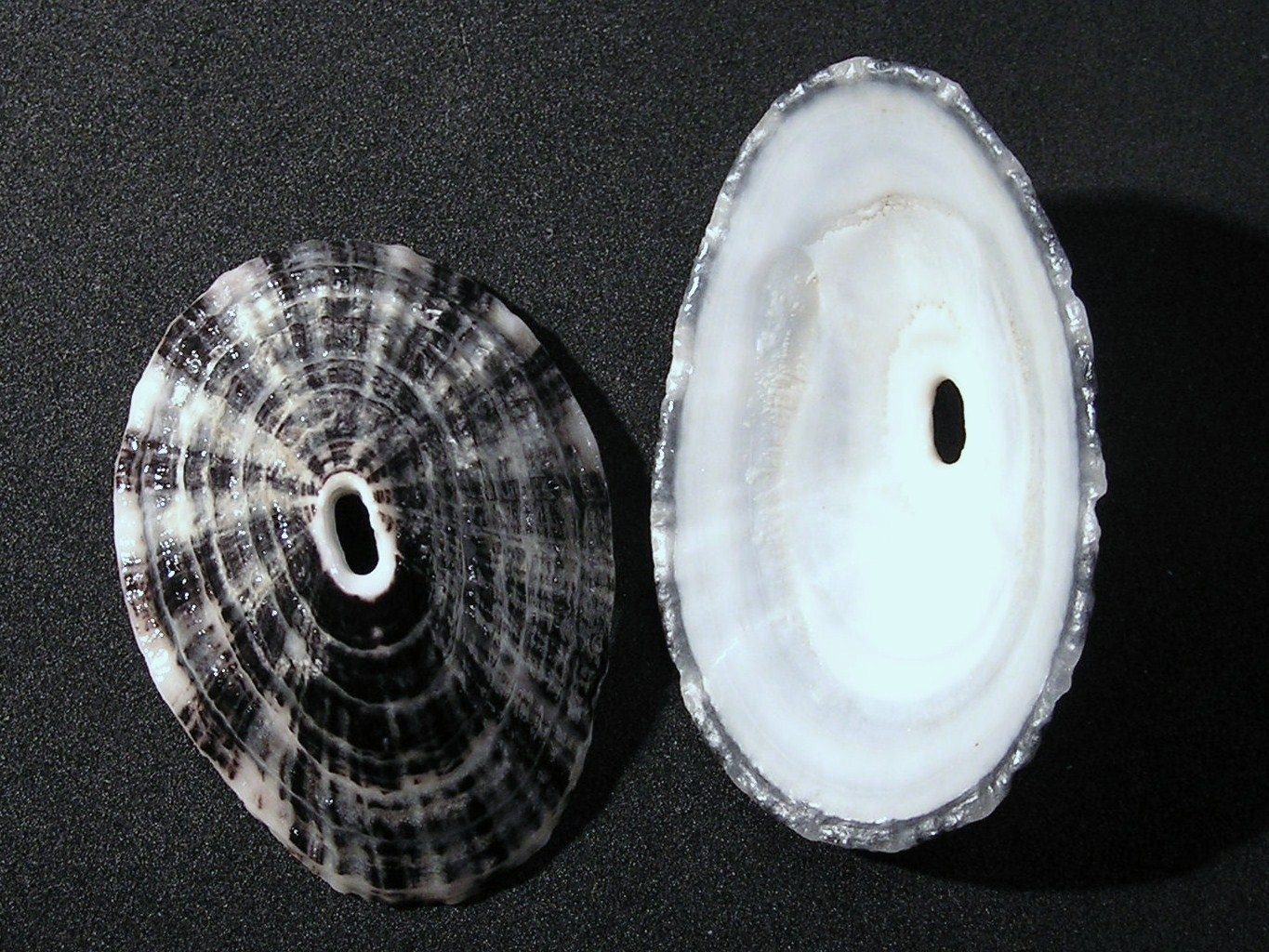
- Top and bottom view of a shell of Fissurella picta

Scientific classification
- Kingdom: Animalia
- Phylum: Mollusca
- Class: Gastropoda
- Subclass: Vetigastropoda
- Order: Lepetellida
- Family: Fissurellidae
- Genus: Fissurella
- Species: F. picta

Binomial name
- Fissurella picta (Gmelin, 1791)

Synonyms
- Fissurella atrata Reeve, 1850; Fissurella lata Sowerby I, 1835; Fissurella muricata Reeve, 1850; Fissurella radiola Deshayes, 1830 (synonymy based on D. Zelaya; Fissurella navidensis Ramirez-Boehme, 1974; Patella picta Gmelin, 1791 (basionym)

= Fissurella picta =

Species of gastropod

Fissurella picta, common name: the painted keyhole limpet, is a species of sea snail, a marine gastropod mollusk in the family Fissurellidae, the keyhole limpets.

Two subspecies:

- Fissurella picta lata Sowerby I, 1835
- Fissurella picta picta (Gmelin, 1791)

== Description ==
The size of an adult shell varies between 35mm and 100mm.

== Distribution ==
This marine species is distributed in the Pacific Ocean along Ecuador and in the Atlantic Ocean along the Falkland Islands.
