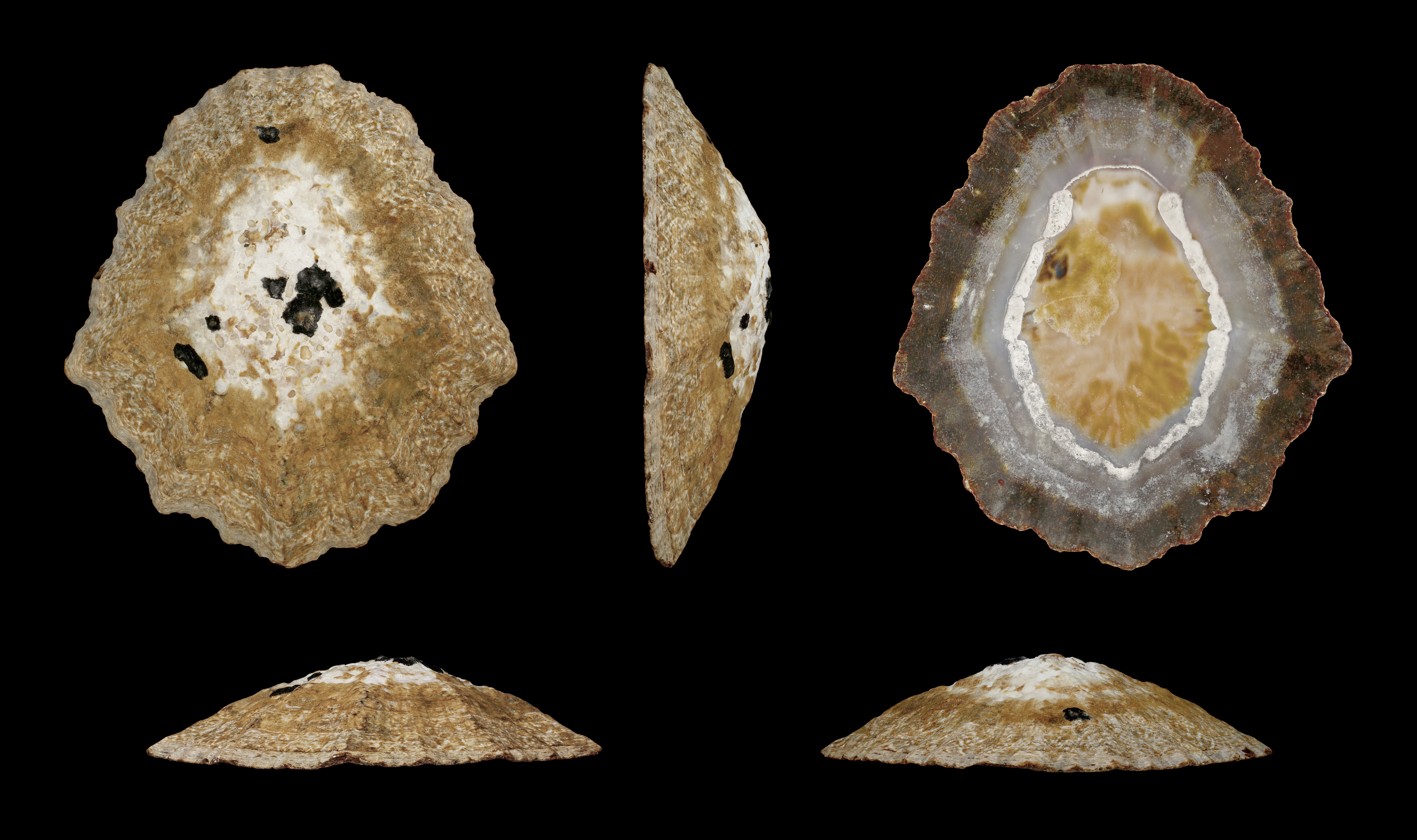
- Five views of a shell of Cymbula oculus

Scientific classification
- Kingdom: Animalia
- Phylum: Mollusca
- Class: Gastropoda
- Subclass: Patellogastropoda
- Family: Patellidae
- Genus: Cymbula
- Species: C. oculus

Binomial name
- Cymbula oculus (Born, 1778)

Synonyms
- Patella oculus Born, 1778

= Cymbula oculus =

Species of gastropod

Cymbula oculus is a species of sea snail, a true limpet, a marine gastropod mollusc in the family Patellidae, one of the families of true limpets.

== Description ==
The shell is low, and a dull brown on the outside. It has about 10 major ribs. The margin of the interior is broad and black, with a light pinkish brown centre. Juveniles are yellow with iridescent green flecks. Attains up to 100 mm length.

== Distribution ==
South coast of South Africa.

== Habitat ==
Inhabits the rocky mid-shore zone.

== Biology ==
Protandrous hermaphrodite, changing to female at about 2 to 3 years. Consumes algae, and large individuals defend themselves by clamping down their shell edges on the predators. Commensal flatworm Notoplana patellarum lives in the gill cavity under the shell. Harvested for food in the Transkei (Eastern Cape).
