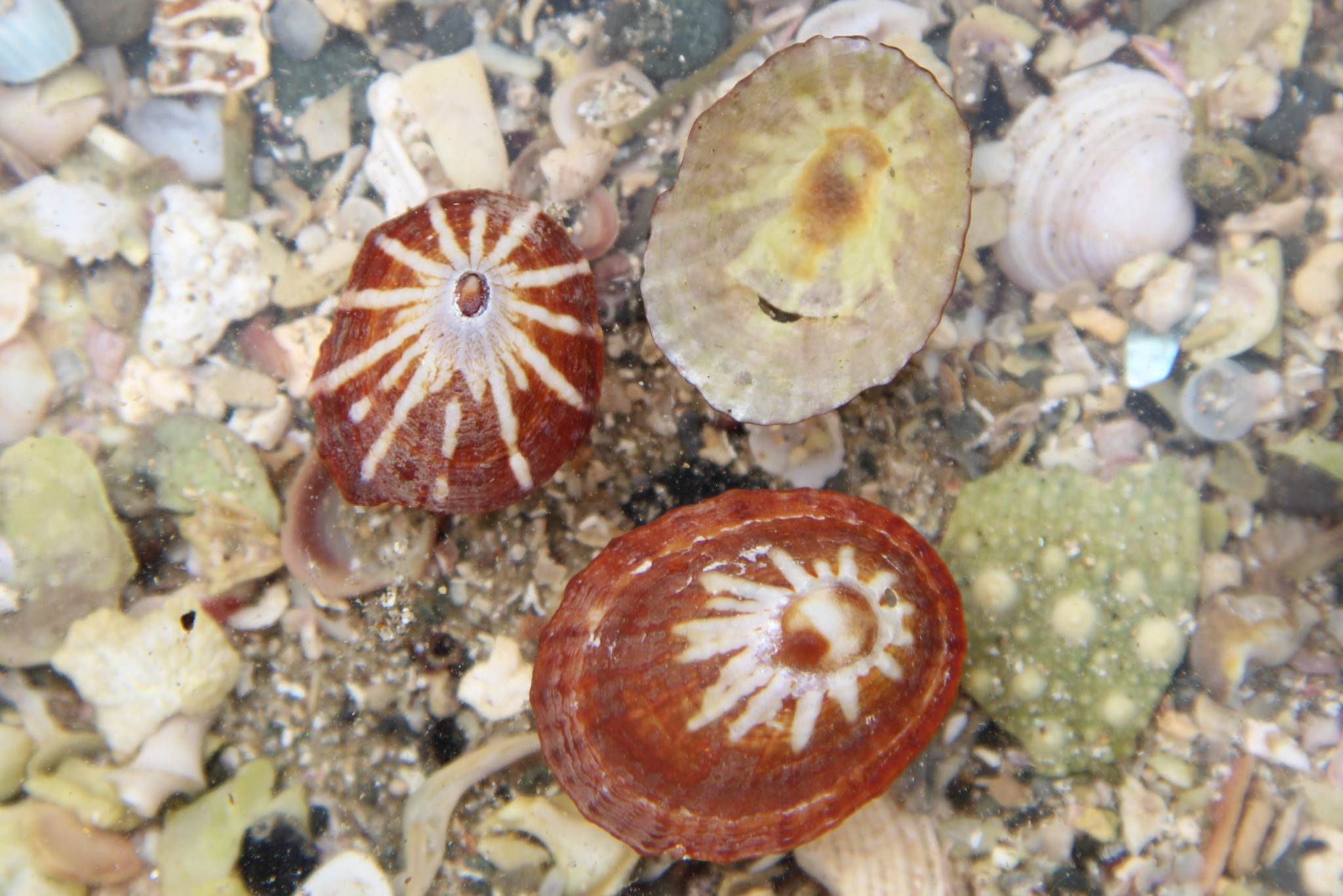

Scientific classification
- Kingdom: Animalia
- Phylum: Mollusca
- Class: Gastropoda
- Subclass: Patellogastropoda
- Family: Nacellidae
- Genus: Cellana
- Species: C. stellifera

Binomial name
- Cellana stellifera (Gmelin, 1791)

Synonyms
- Helcioniscus stellifera phymatius Suter, 1905; Helcioniscus stelliferus (Gmelin, 1791); Helcioniscus stelliferus phymatius Suter, 1905; Patella stellifera Gmelin, 1791 (original combination); Patella stellularia Quoy & Gaimard, 1834

= Cellana stellifera =

Species of gastropod

Cellana stellifera, common name the star limpet, is a species of true limpet, a marine gastropod mollusc in the family Nacellidae.

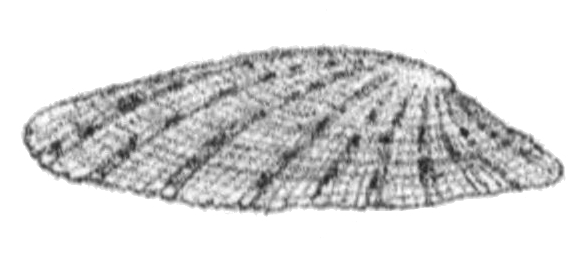
Black and white drawing of the shell of Cellana stellifera. Lateral view (right side). Head region is on the right.
