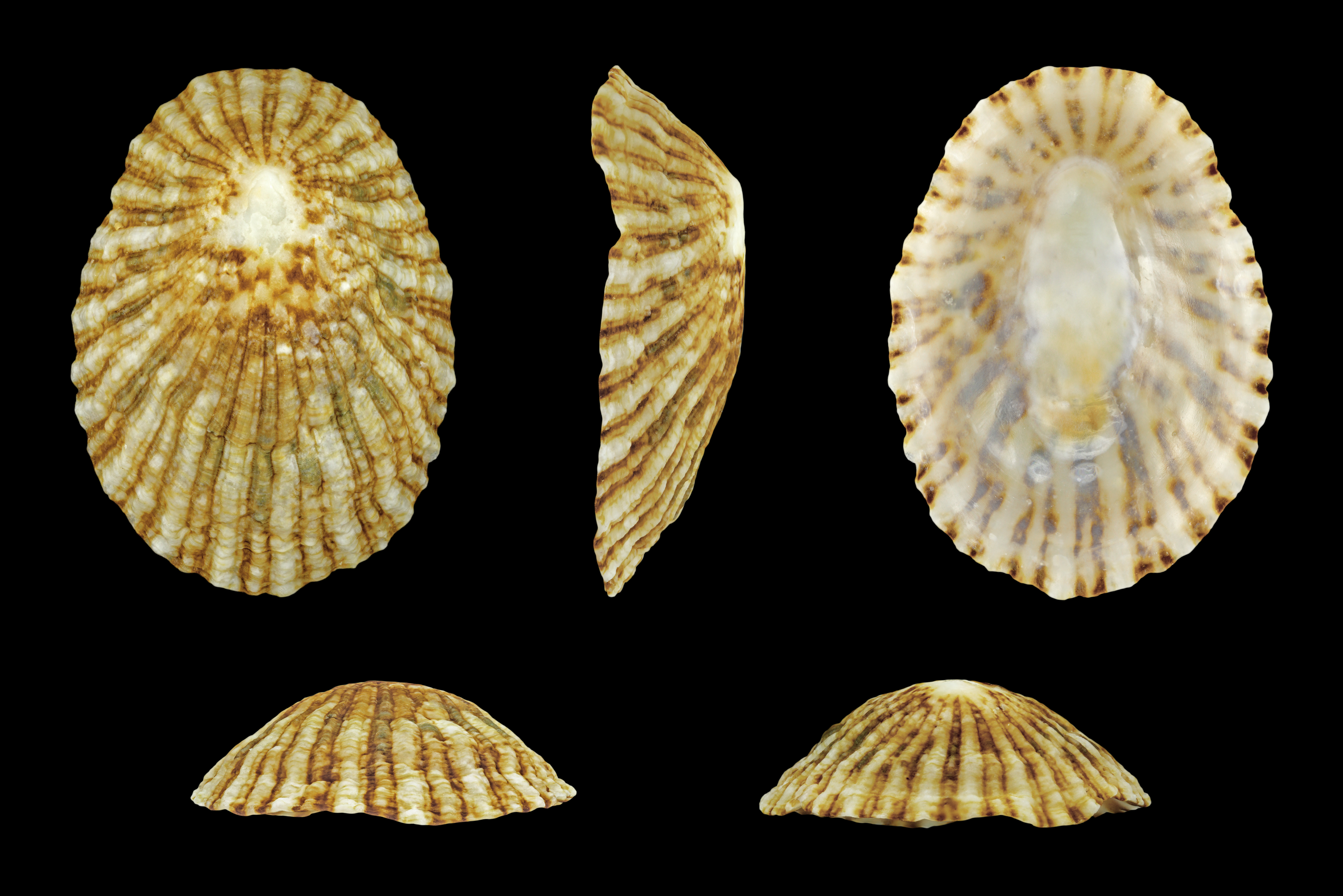

Scientific classification
- Kingdom: Animalia
- Phylum: Mollusca
- Class: Gastropoda
- Subclass: Patellogastropoda
- Family: Patellidae
- Genus: Cymbula
- Species: C. safiana

Binomial name
- Cymbula safiana (Lamarck, 1819)

Synonyms
- Cymbula nigra (da Costa, 1771); Patella adansonii Dunker, 1853; Patella albida Mörch, 1853; Patella algira Deshayes, 1840; Patella conspicua Philippi, 1849; Patella guineensis Gmelin, 1791; Patella kraussii Dunker, 1853; Patella nigra da Costa, 1771; Patella plumbea Lamarck, 1819; Patella safiana Lamarck, 1819 (original combination); Patella safiana var. elevata Pallary, 1900; Patella squamata Gmelin, 1791; Patella (Laevipatella) safiana Lamarck, 1819

= Cymbula safiana =

Species of gastropod

Cymbula safiana, common name the saffian limpet, is a species of sea snail, a true limpet, a marine gastropod mollusc in the family Patellidae, one of the families of true limpets.

== Description ==
The size of the shell varies between 25 mm and 120 mm.

== Distribution ==
This marine species has a wide distribution ranging from the Mediterranean Sea to Angola.
