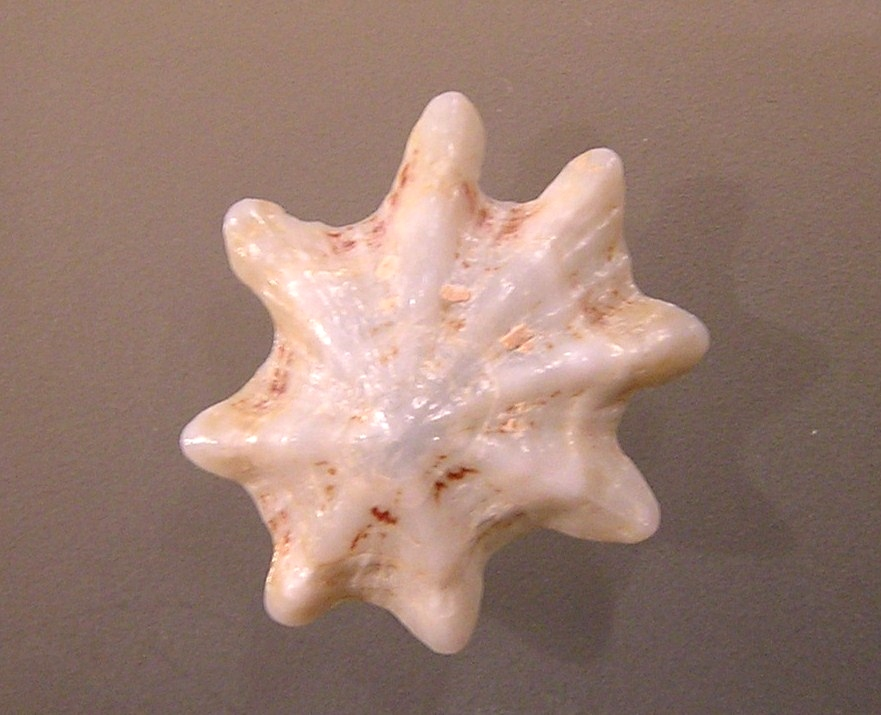
- Scutellastra chapmani

Scientific classification
- Kingdom: Animalia
- Phylum: Mollusca
- Class: Gastropoda
- Subclass: Patellogastropoda
- Family: Patellidae
- Genus: Scutellastra
- Species: S. chapmani

Binomial name
- Scutellastra chapmani (Tenison-Woods, 1875)

Synonyms
- Patella chapmani J. E. Tennison-Woods, 1875

= Scutellastra chapmani =

Species of gastropod

Scutellastra chapmani is a species of sea snail, a true limpet, a marine gastropod mollusk in the family Patellidae, one of the families of true limpets.

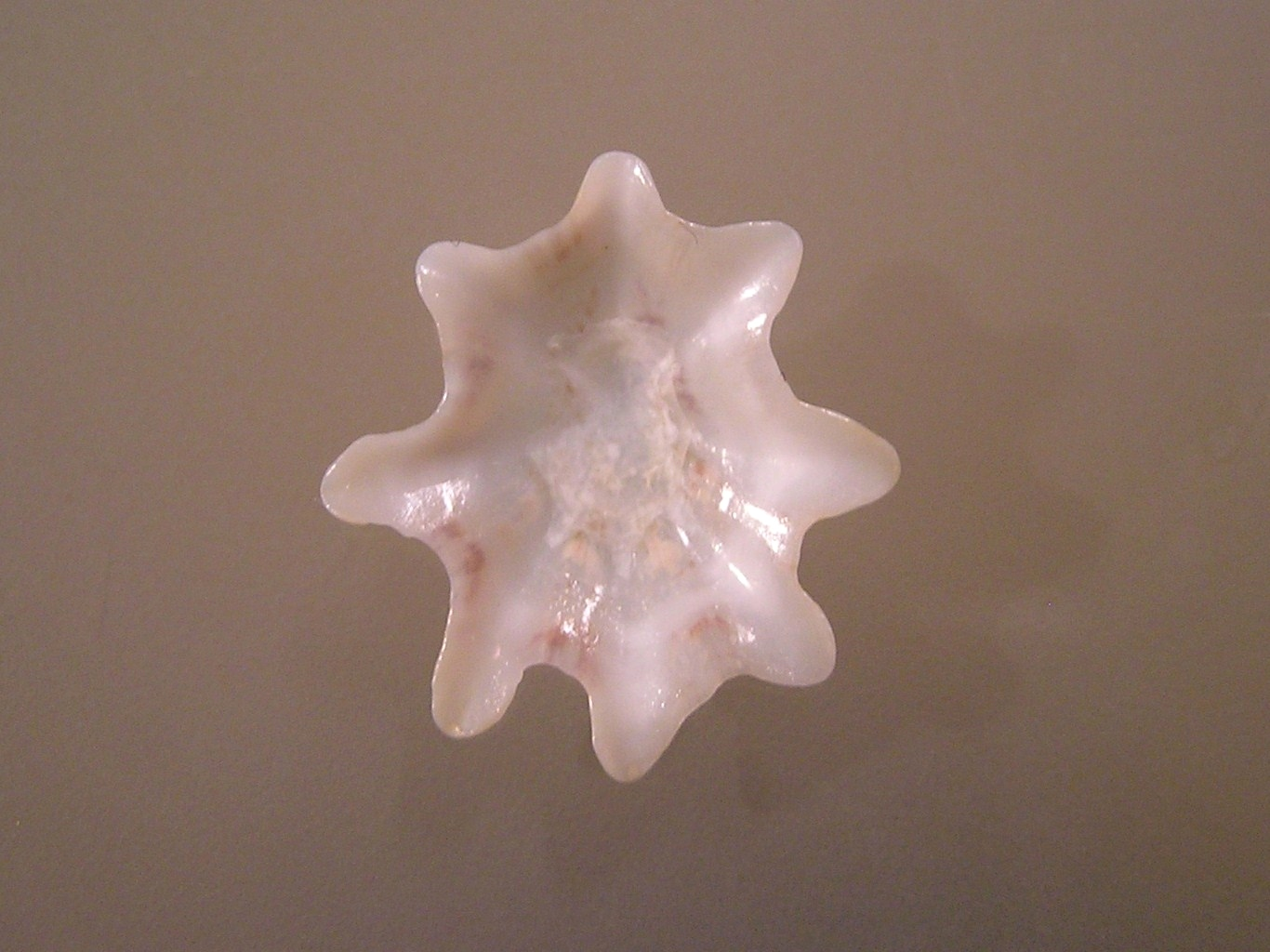
Scutellastra chapmani, ventral view
