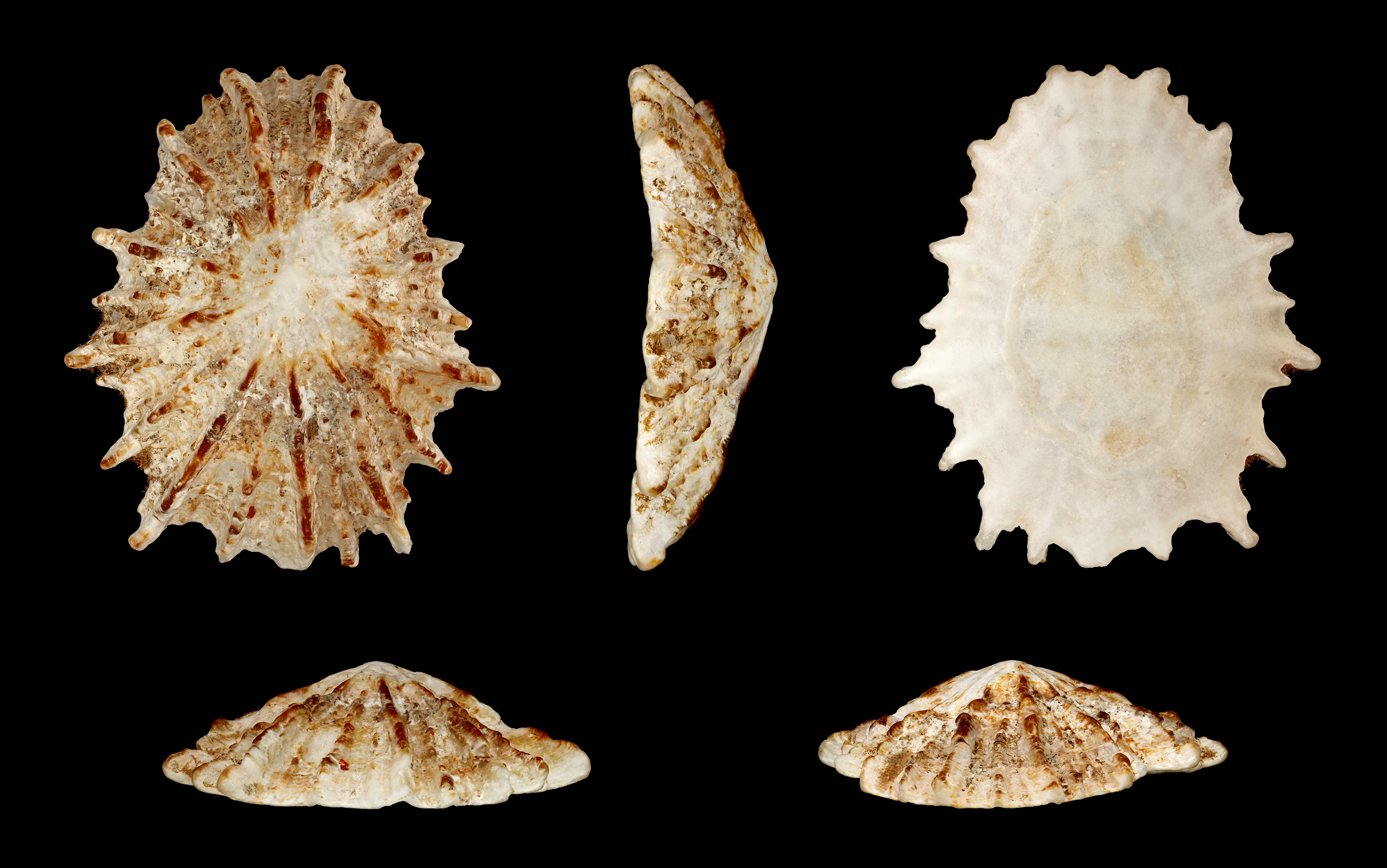
- Five views of a shell of Scutellastra barbara

Scientific classification
- Kingdom: Animalia
- Phylum: Mollusca
- Class: Gastropoda
- Subclass: Patellogastropoda
- Family: Patellidae
- Genus: Scutellastra
- Species: S. barbara

Binomial name
- Scutellastra barbara (Linnaeus, 1758)

Synonyms
- Patella (Scutellastra) barbara Linnaeus, 1758; Patella barbara Linnaeus, 1758

= Scutellastra barbara =

Species of gastropod

Scutellastra barbara is a species of sea snail, a true limpet, a marine gastropod mollusk in the family Patellidae, one of the families of true limpets.

== Description ==
Species has been found to measure around 100 mm. Different populations of Patella barbara are both morphologically indistinguishable and genetically homogenous along the coast of South Africa.

== Distribution ==
The bearded limpet, Scutellastra barbara, is distributed throughout the east and west coasts of South Africa, between Port Nolloth and Umpangazi. The juveniles prefer substrates made of Haliotis midae shells, and they are usually found in intertidal areas at low densities.
