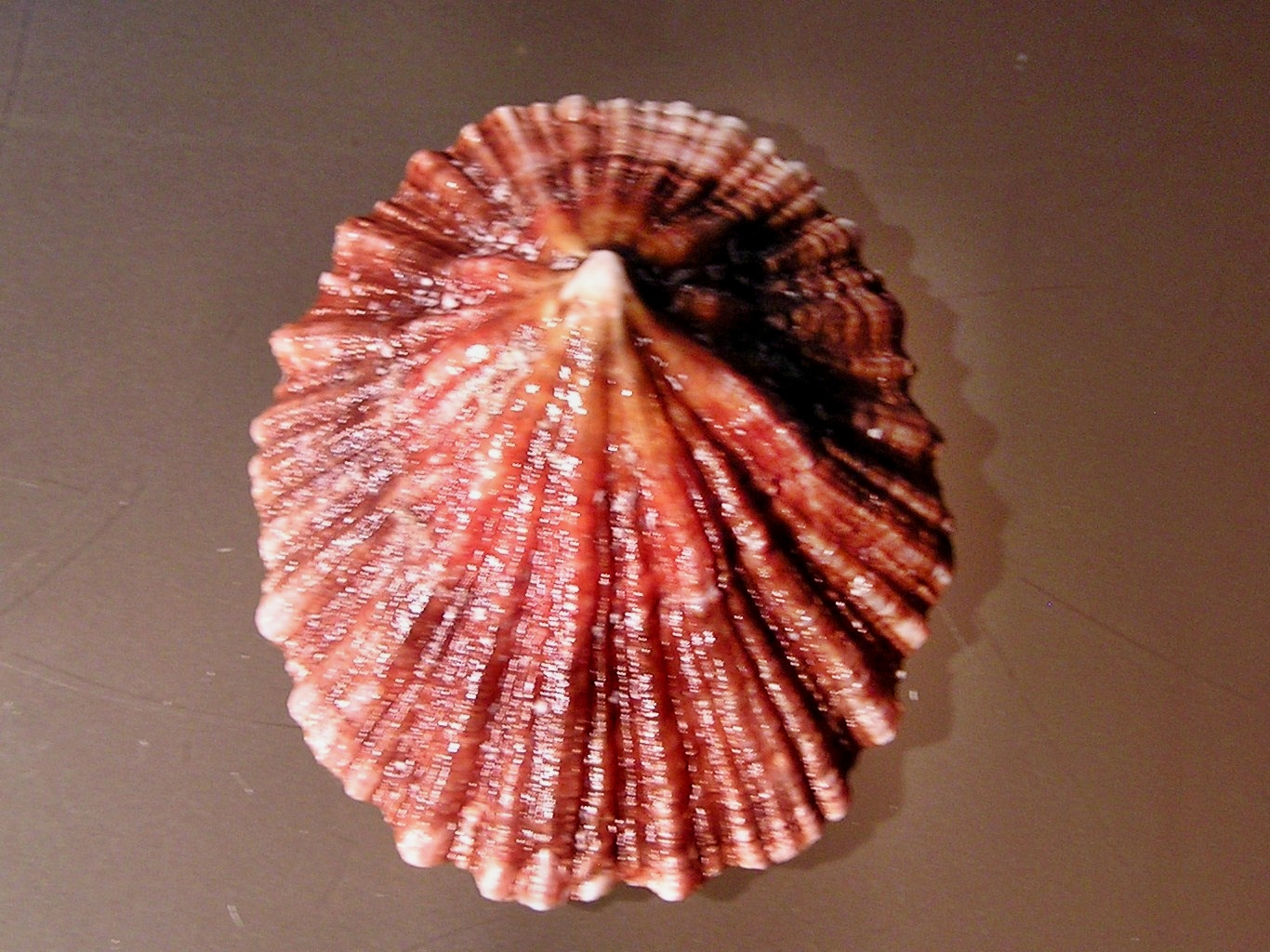

Scientific classification
- Kingdom: Animalia
- Phylum: Mollusca
- Class: Gastropoda
- Subclass: Patellogastropoda
- Family: Patellidae
- Genus: Scutellastra
- Species: S. tabularis

Binomial name
- Scutellastra tabularis (Krauss, 1848)

Synonyms
- Patella (Scutellastra) tabularis Krauss, 1848; Patella tabularis Krauss, 1848 (original combination)

= Scutellastra tabularis =

Species of gastropod

Scutellastra tabularis is a species of sea snail, a true limpet, a marine gastropod mollusk in the family Patellidae, one of the families of true limpets.

== Distribution ==
This marine species occurs off the south coast of South Africa.

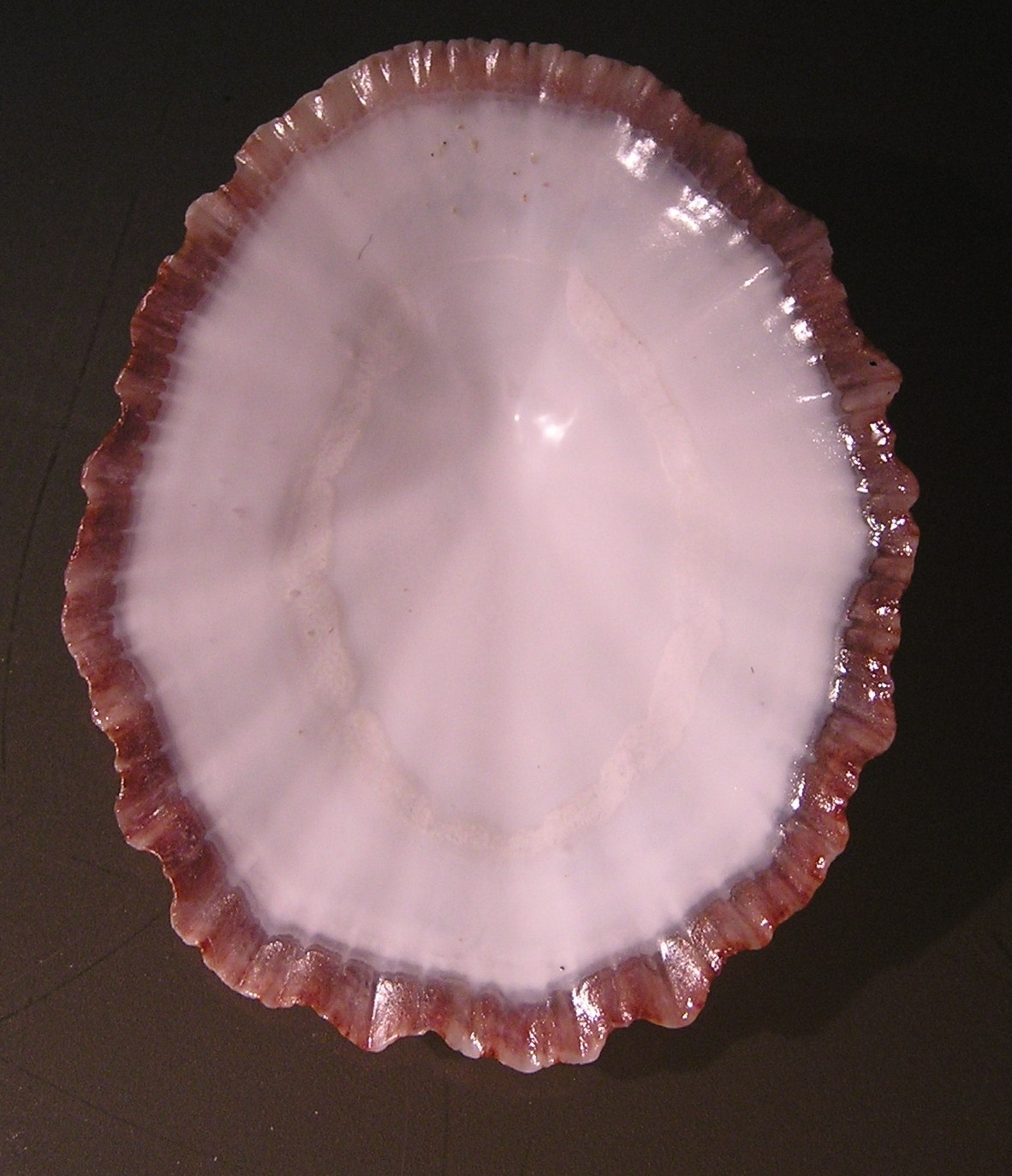
Scutellastra tabularis, ventral view
