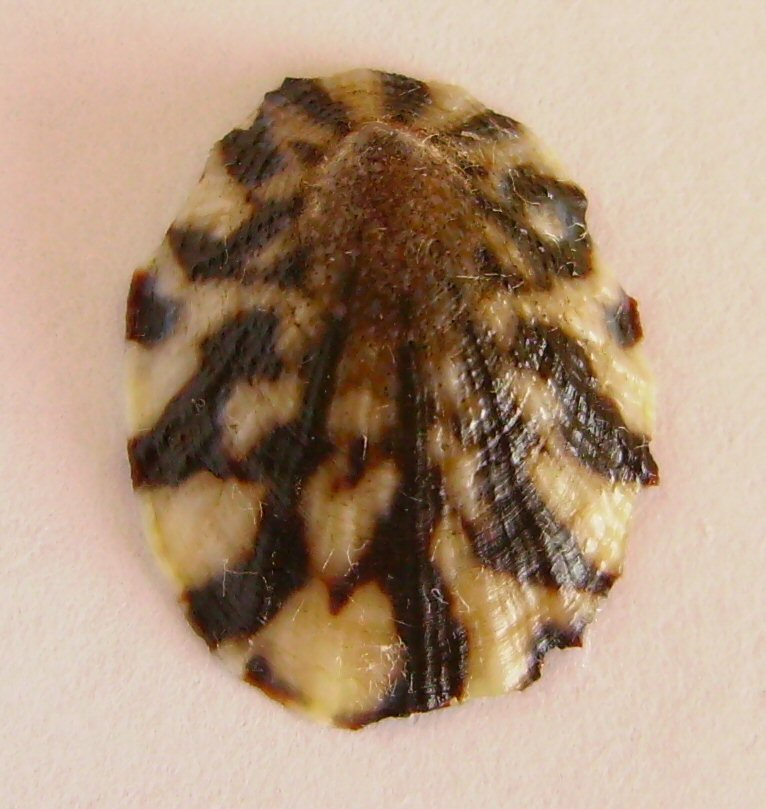

Scientific classification
- Kingdom: Animalia
- Phylum: Mollusca
- Class: Gastropoda
- Subclass: Patellogastropoda
- Family: Nacellidae
- Genus: Cellana
- Species: C. radians

Binomial name
- Cellana radians (Gmelin, 1791)

Synonyms
- Cellana radians perana Iredale, 1915; Helcioniscus radians Suter, 1913; Nacella flexuosa Hutton, 1873; Patella antipodum E.A. Smith, 1874; Patella argentea Quoy and Gaimard, 1834; Patella argyropsis Lesson, 1830; Patella decora Philippi, 1849; Patella earlii Reeve, 1855; Patella flexuosa Hutton, 1873; Patella morio Noodt, 1819; Patella olivacea Hutton, 1882; Patella pholidota Lesson, 1830; Patella radians Gmelin, 1791; Patella radiatilis Hombron & Jacquinot, 1841

= Cellana radians =

Species of gastropod

Cellana radians, common name the radiate limpet, is a species of true limpet, a marine gastropod mollusc in the family Nacellidae, which is one of the true limpet families.

== Description ==
The foot and the head are lightly colored whereas Cellana flava has darker colored soft tissues. The shell exhibits different morphological varieties, even in the same location. The shell can be grayish white on the outside with rather flat ribs that are somewhat darker. Its interior is iridescent and white, with gray muscle impressions. The apex is off-center and sometimes worn off.

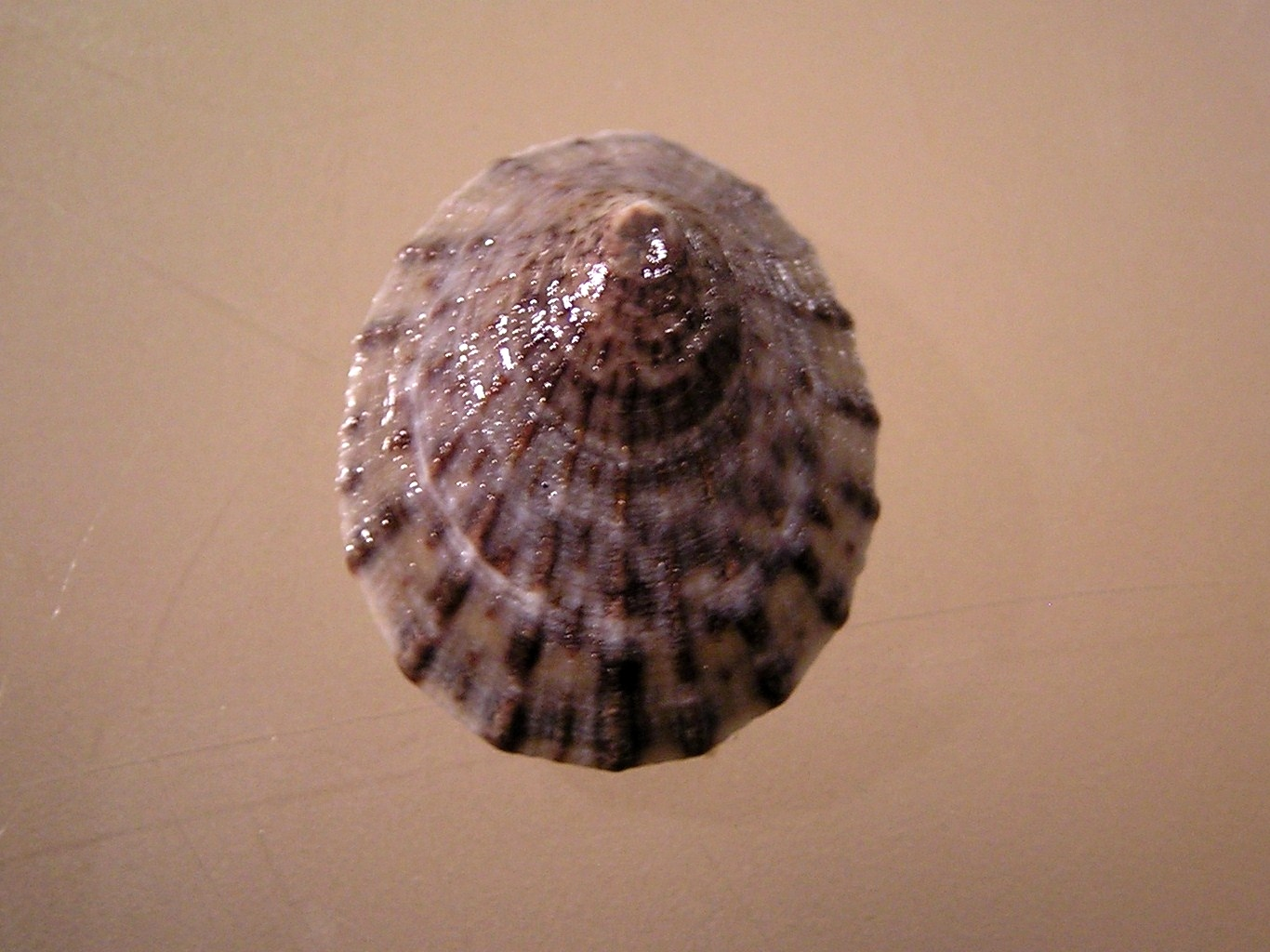
Apical view

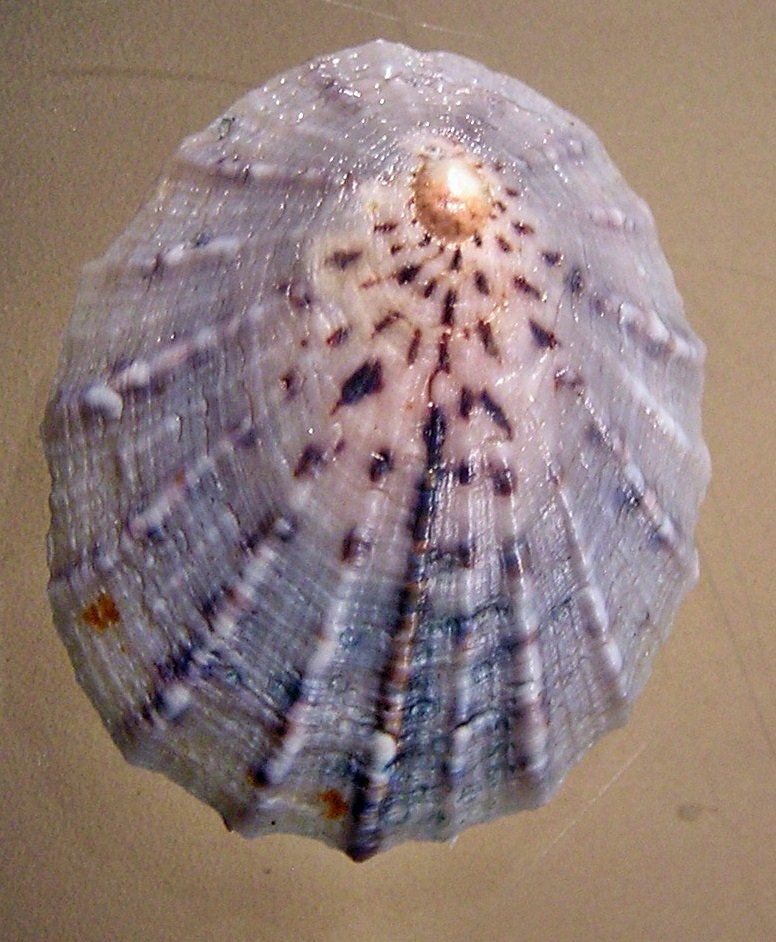
Apical view

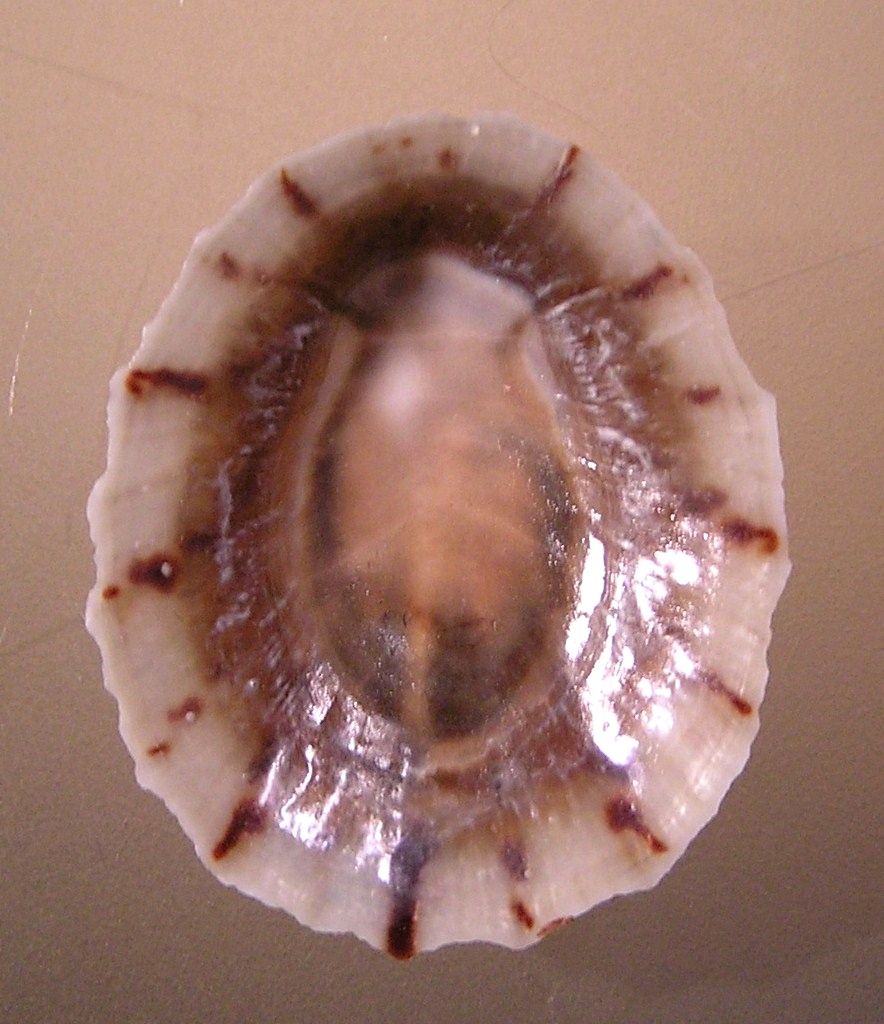
Ventral view

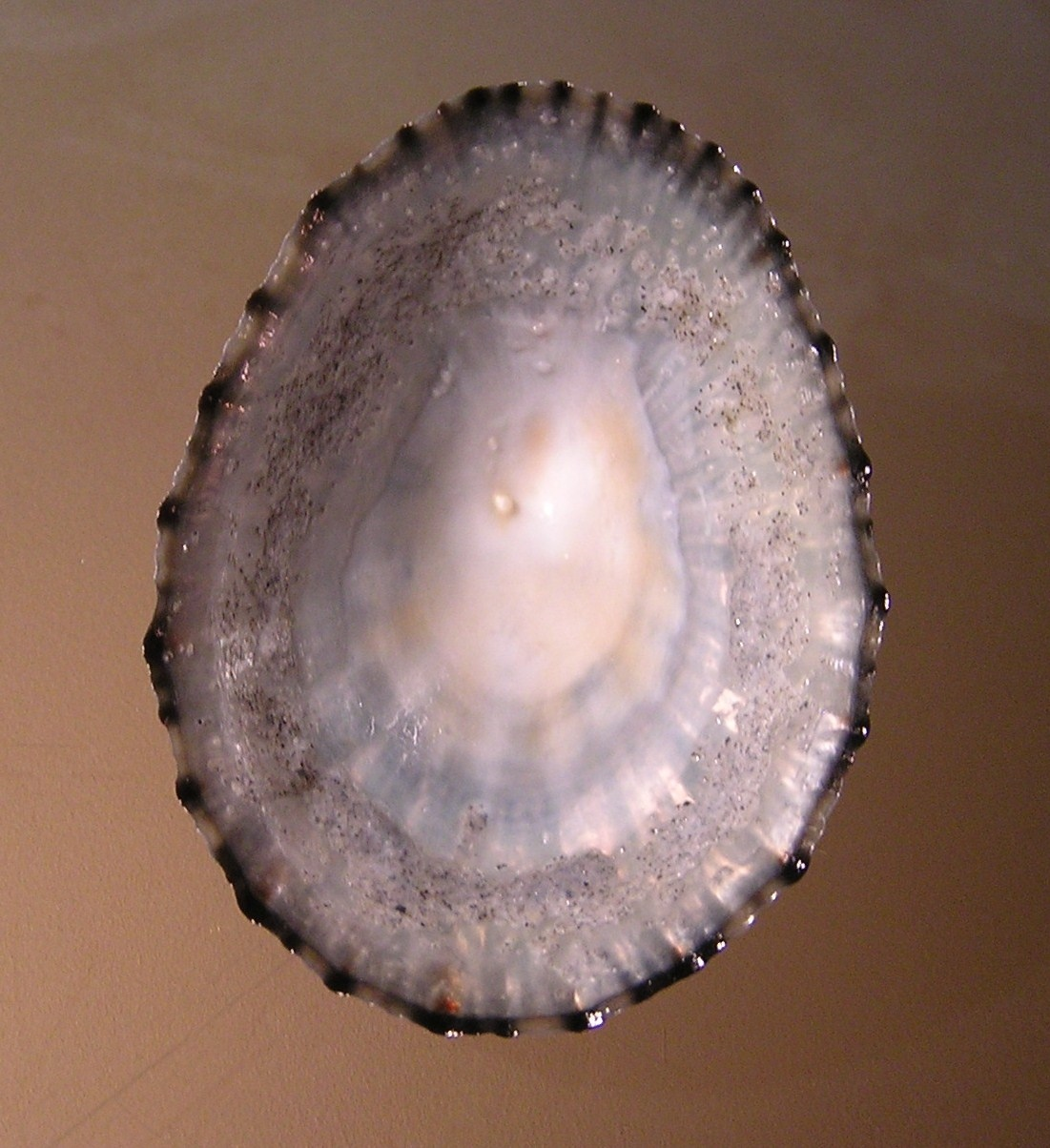
Ventral view
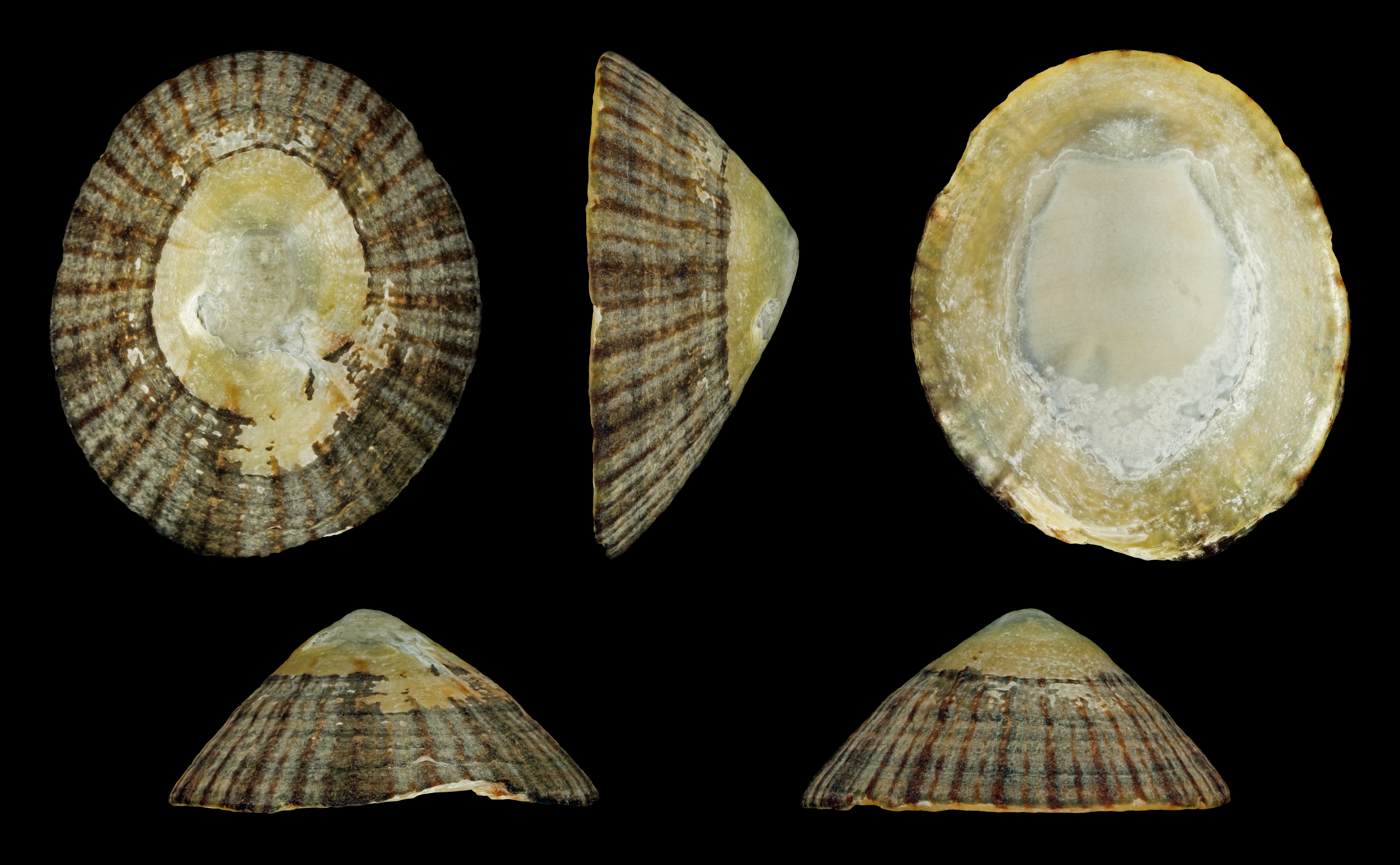
forma perana

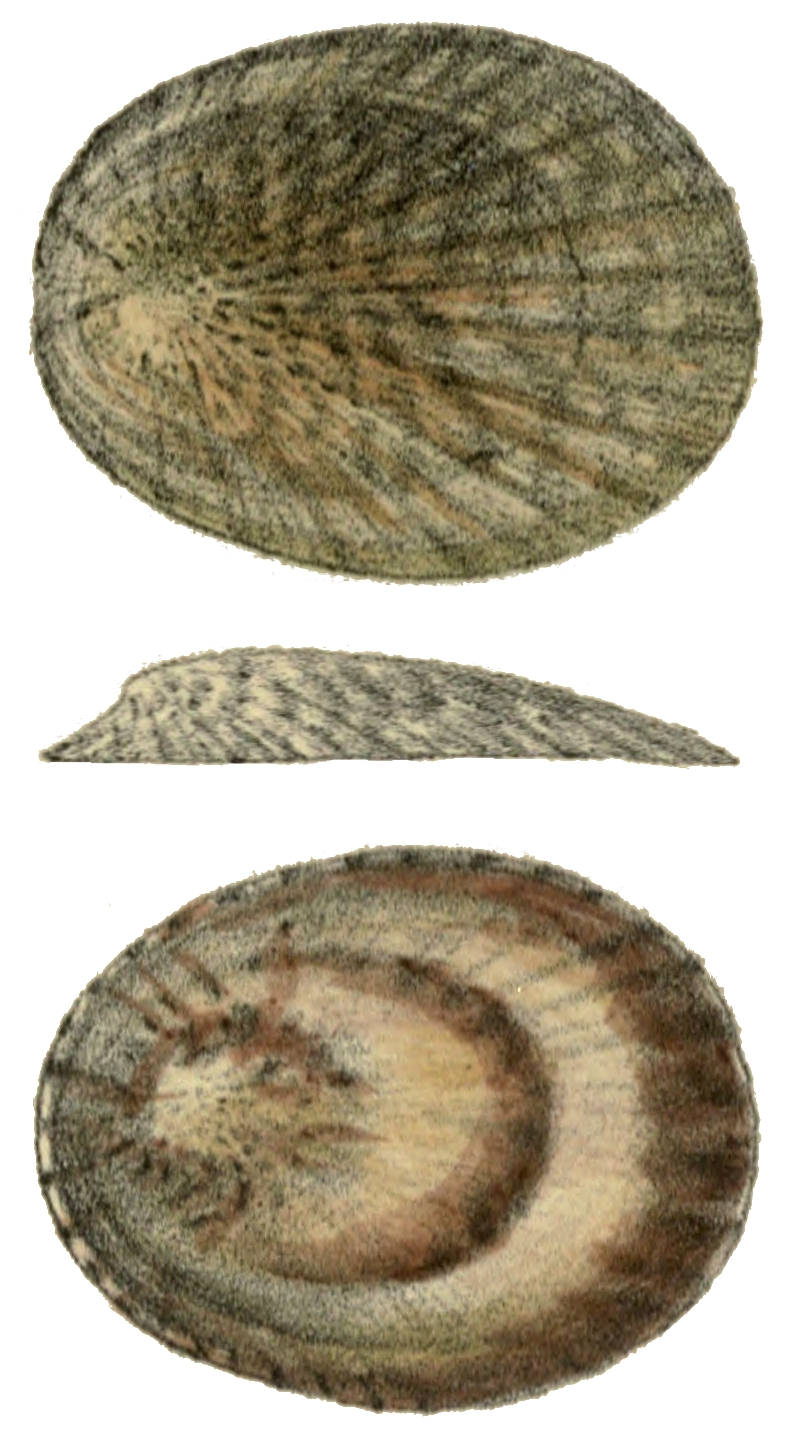
Drawing of the shell with dorsal view, lateral view (left side) and ventral view. Head region is on the left.

== Ecology ==
Cellana radians is found on rocks and other hard substrates in the littoral and sublittoral zones of the seas around New Zealand.
