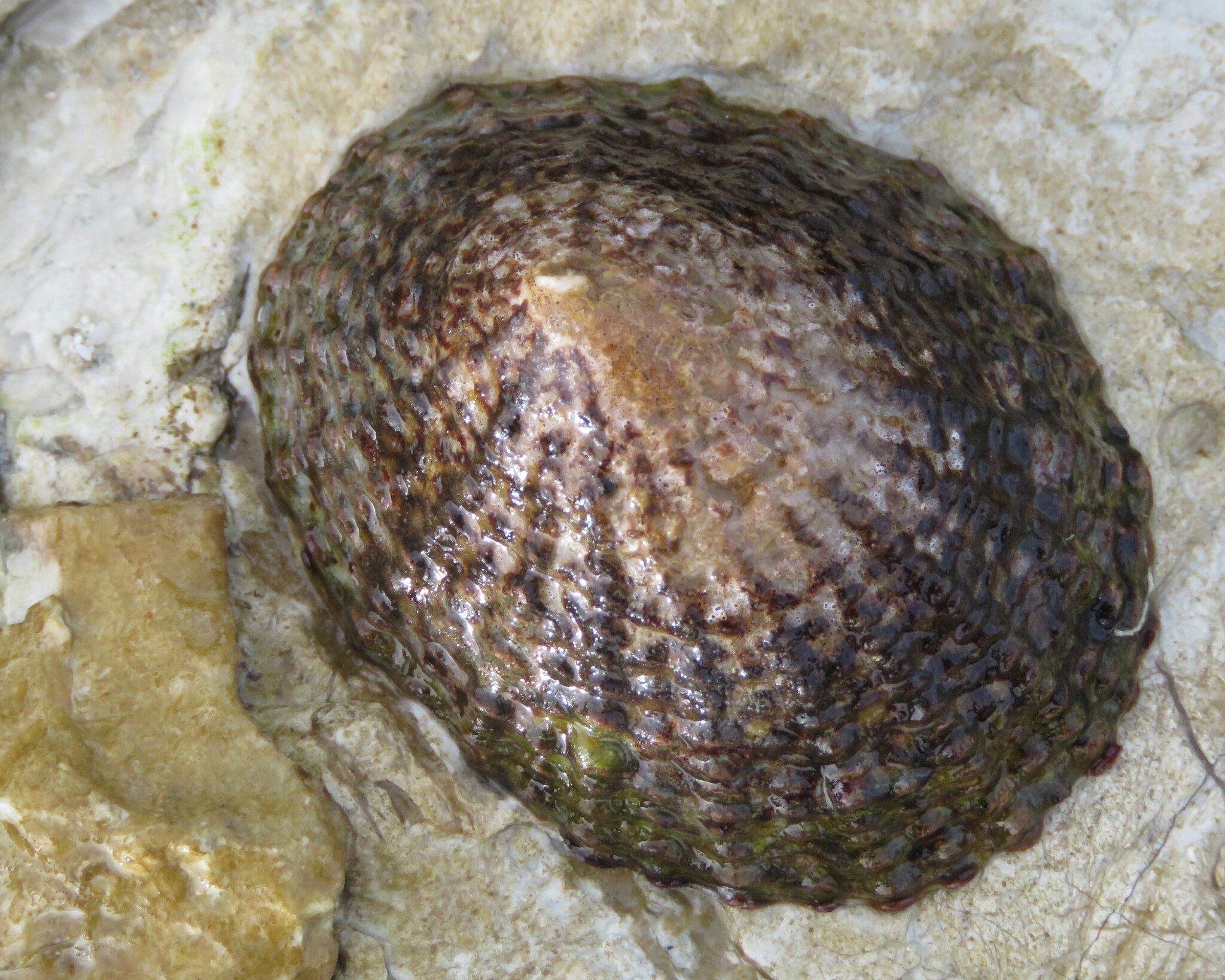

Scientific classification
- Kingdom: Animalia
- Phylum: Mollusca
- Class: Gastropoda
- Subclass: Patellogastropoda
- Family: Nacellidae
- Genus: Cellana
- Species: C. denticulata

Binomial name
- Cellana denticulata (Martyn, 1784)

Synonyms
- Patella denticulata Martyn, 1784

= Cellana denticulata =

Species of gastropod

Cellana denticulata, or the denticulate limpet, is a species of true limpet, a marine gastropod mollusc in the family Nacellidae, one of the families of true limpets. It is endemic to New Zealand.
