= Cellana karachiensis =

Scientific classification
- Kingdom: Animalia
- Phylum: Mollusca
- Class: Gastropoda
- Subclass: Patellogastropoda
- Family: Nacellidae
- Genus: Cellana
- Species: C. karachiensis

Binomial name
- Cellana karachiensis (Winckworth, 1930)

Synonyms
- Patella capensis karachiensis Winckworth, 1930 (original combination)

Species of gastropod

Cellana karachiensis is a species of limpet, a marine gastropod mollusc in the family Nacellidae.
