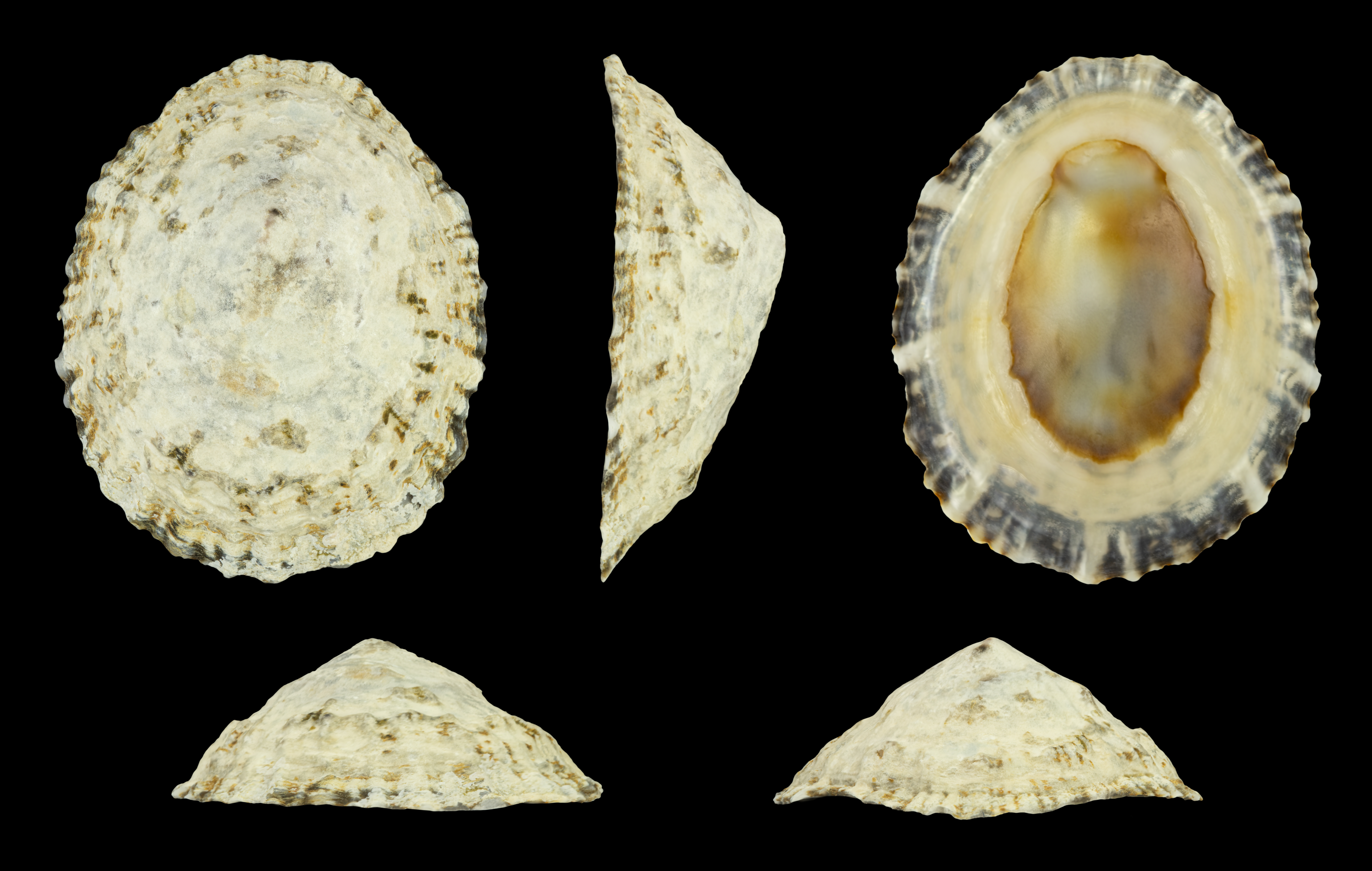

Scientific classification
- Kingdom: Animalia
- Phylum: Mollusca
- Class: Gastropoda
- Subclass: Patellogastropoda
- Family: Nacellidae
- Genus: Cellana
- Species: C. pricei

Binomial name
- Cellana pricei Powell, 1973

= Cellana pricei =

Species of gastropod

Cellana pricei is a species of limpet, a marine gastropod mollusc in the family Nacellidae.
