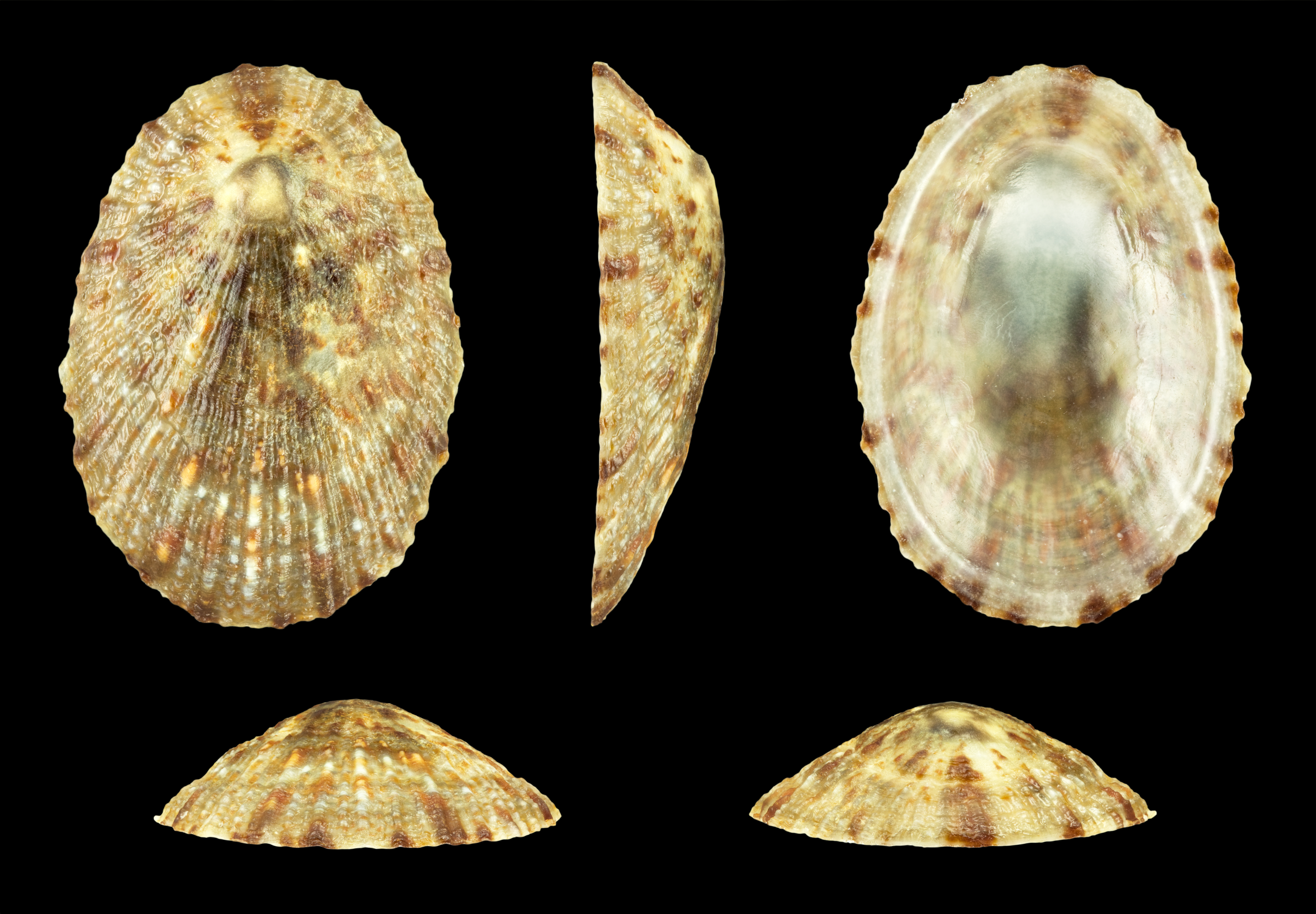

Scientific classification
- Kingdom: Animalia
- Phylum: Mollusca
- Class: Gastropoda
- Subclass: Patellogastropoda
- Family: Nacellidae
- Genus: Cellana
- Species: C. toreuma

Binomial name
- Cellana toreuma (Reeve, 1854)

Synonyms
- Patella toreuma Reeve, 1854 (original combination)

= Cellana toreuma =

Species of gastropod

Cellana toreuma is a species of limpet, a marine gastropod mollusk in the family Nacellidae.

== Distribution ==
Mainly distributed in South Korea, Mainland China, Taiwan, Japan, Ryukyu and Vietnam.

== Parasite ==
This species is the ectoparasitic host of Philoblenna tumida Ho, 1981。

== Gallery ==
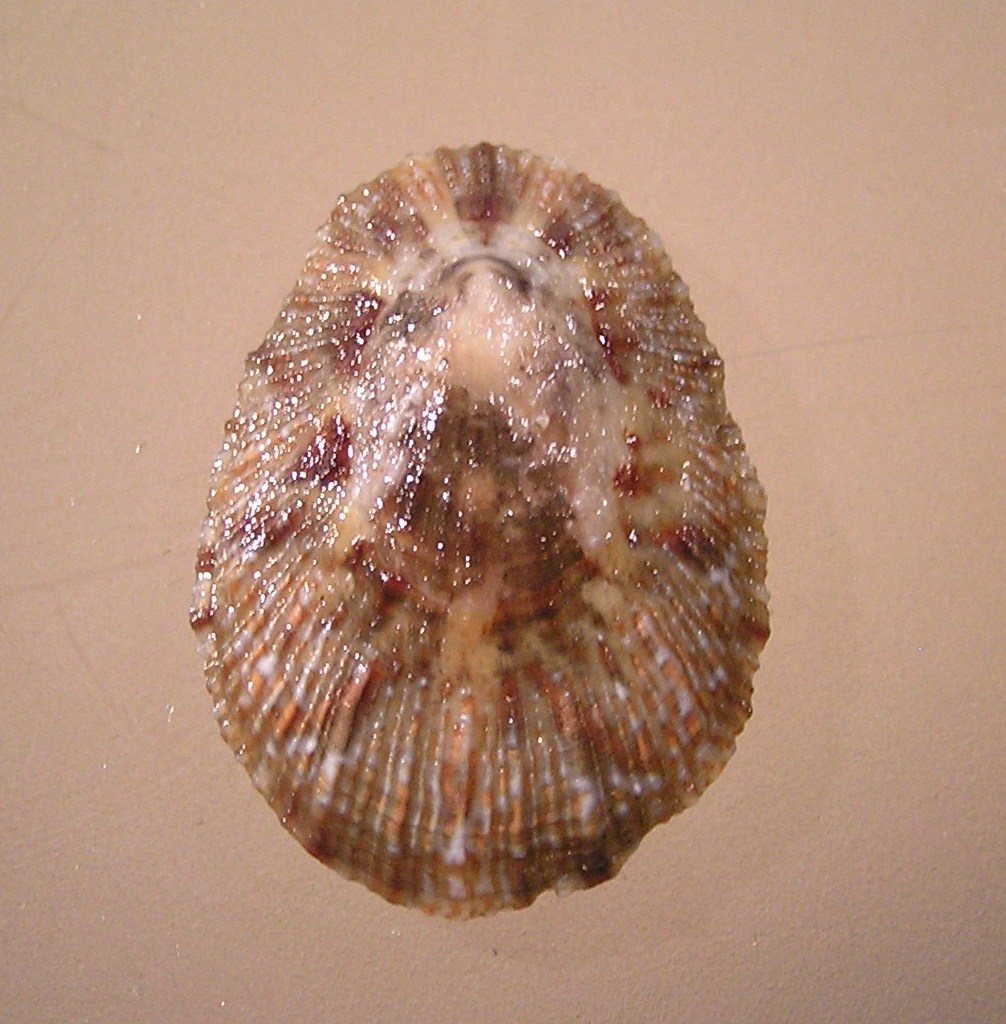
apical view of the shell

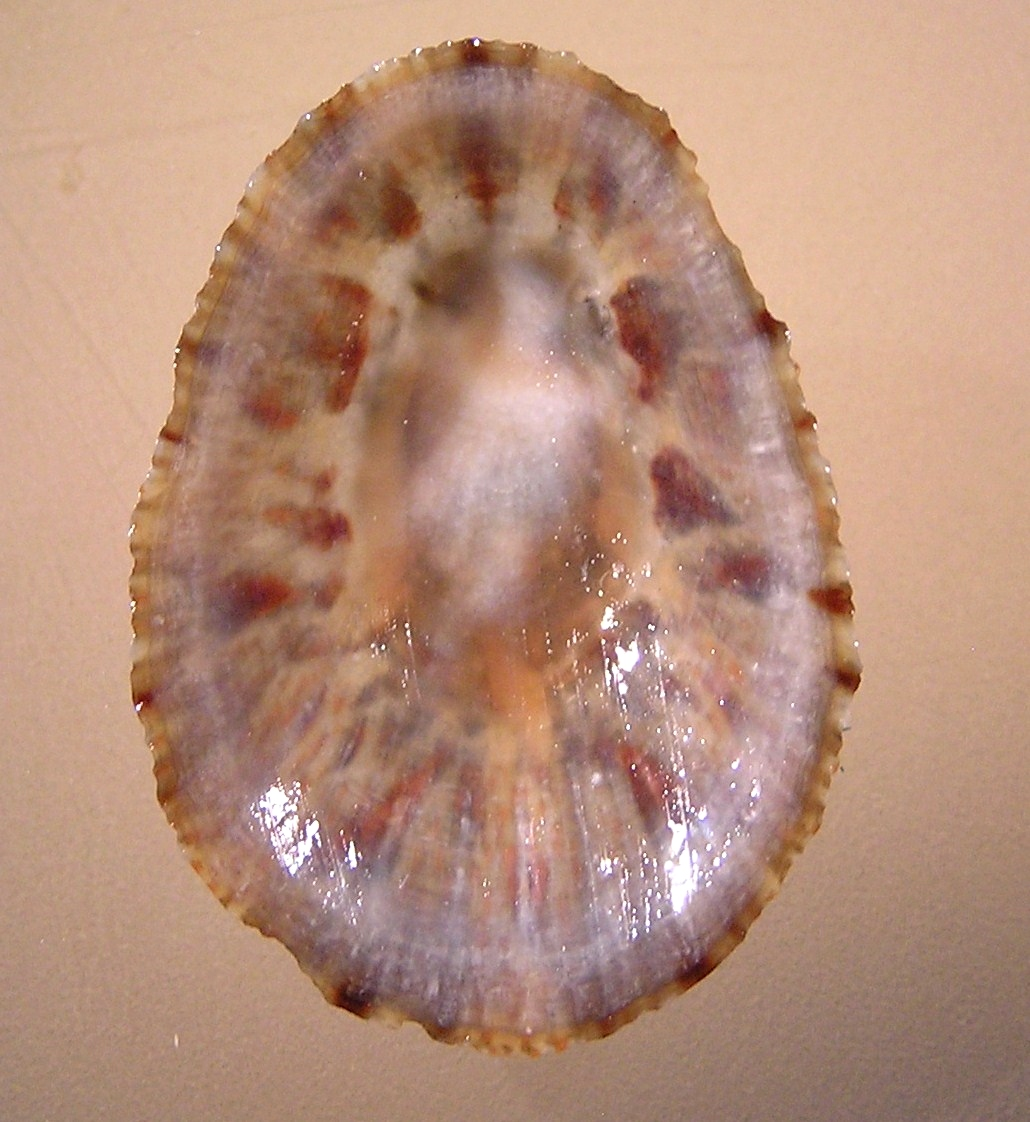
ventral view of the shell
