= Cellana oliveri =

Conservation status
- Naturally Uncommon (NZ TCS)

Scientific classification
- Kingdom: Animalia
- Phylum: Mollusca
- Class: Gastropoda
- Subclass: Patellogastropoda
- Family: Nacellidae
- Genus: Cellana
- Species: C. oliveri

Binomial name
- Cellana oliveri Powell, 1955

Synonyms
- Cellana strigilis bollonsi Powell, 1955; Cellana strigilis chathamensis of authors not Pilsbry, 1891; Cellana strigilis oliveri Powell, 1955

Species of gastropod

Cellana oliveri is a species of large limpet, a marine gastropod mollusc in the family Nacellidae, one of the families of true limpets.
