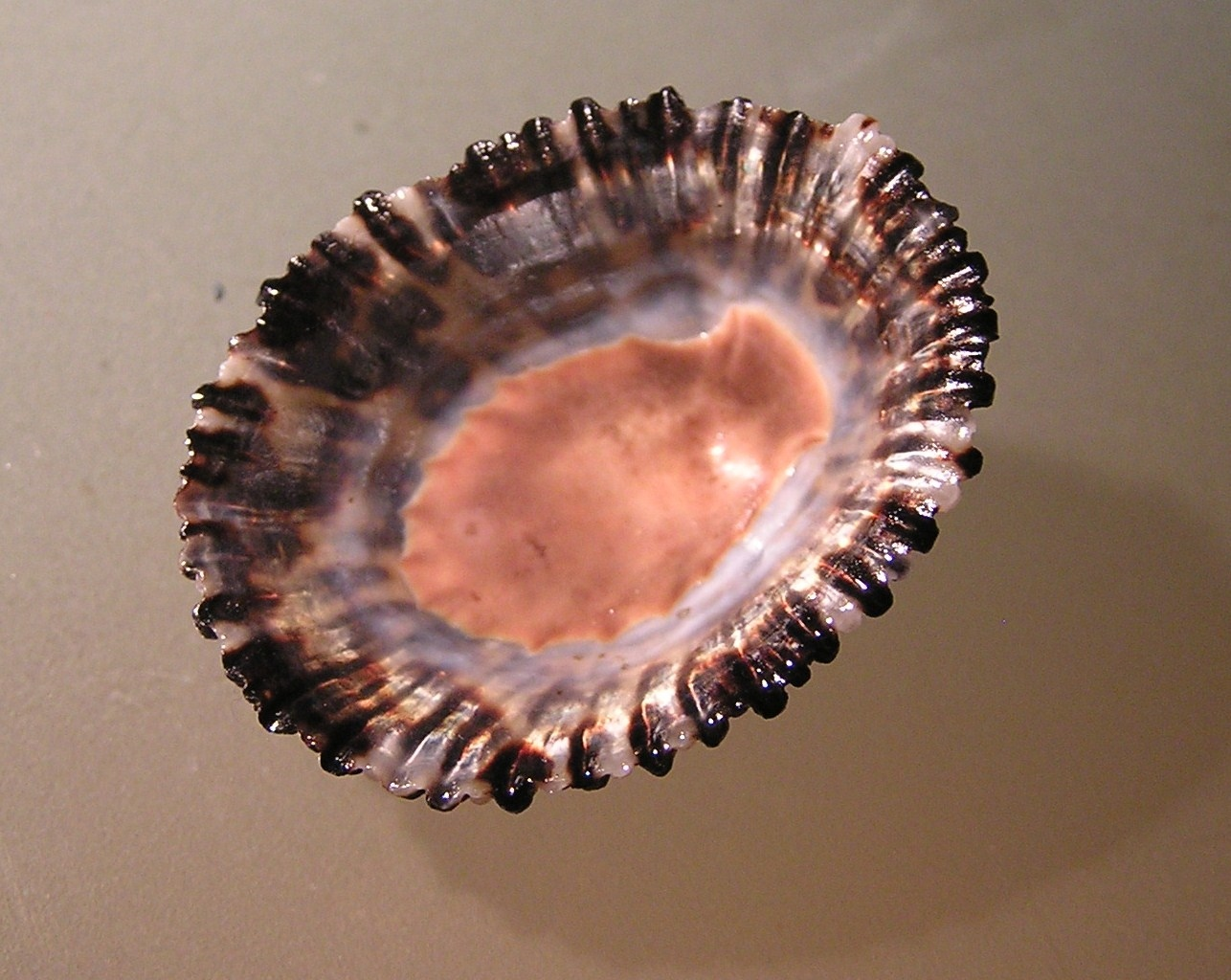

Scientific classification
- Kingdom: Animalia
- Phylum: Mollusca
- Class: Gastropoda
- Subclass: Patellogastropoda
- Family: Nacellidae
- Genus: Cellana
- Species: C. grata

Binomial name
- Cellana grata (Gould, 1859)

Synonyms
- Cellana grata f. stearnsii (Pilsbry, 1891); Patella grata Gould, 1859 (original combination)

= Cellana grata =

Species of gastropod

Cellana grata is a true limpet, that feeds on epilithic biofilm.

== Distribution ==
This species is found off the coast from Japan to Vietnam.
