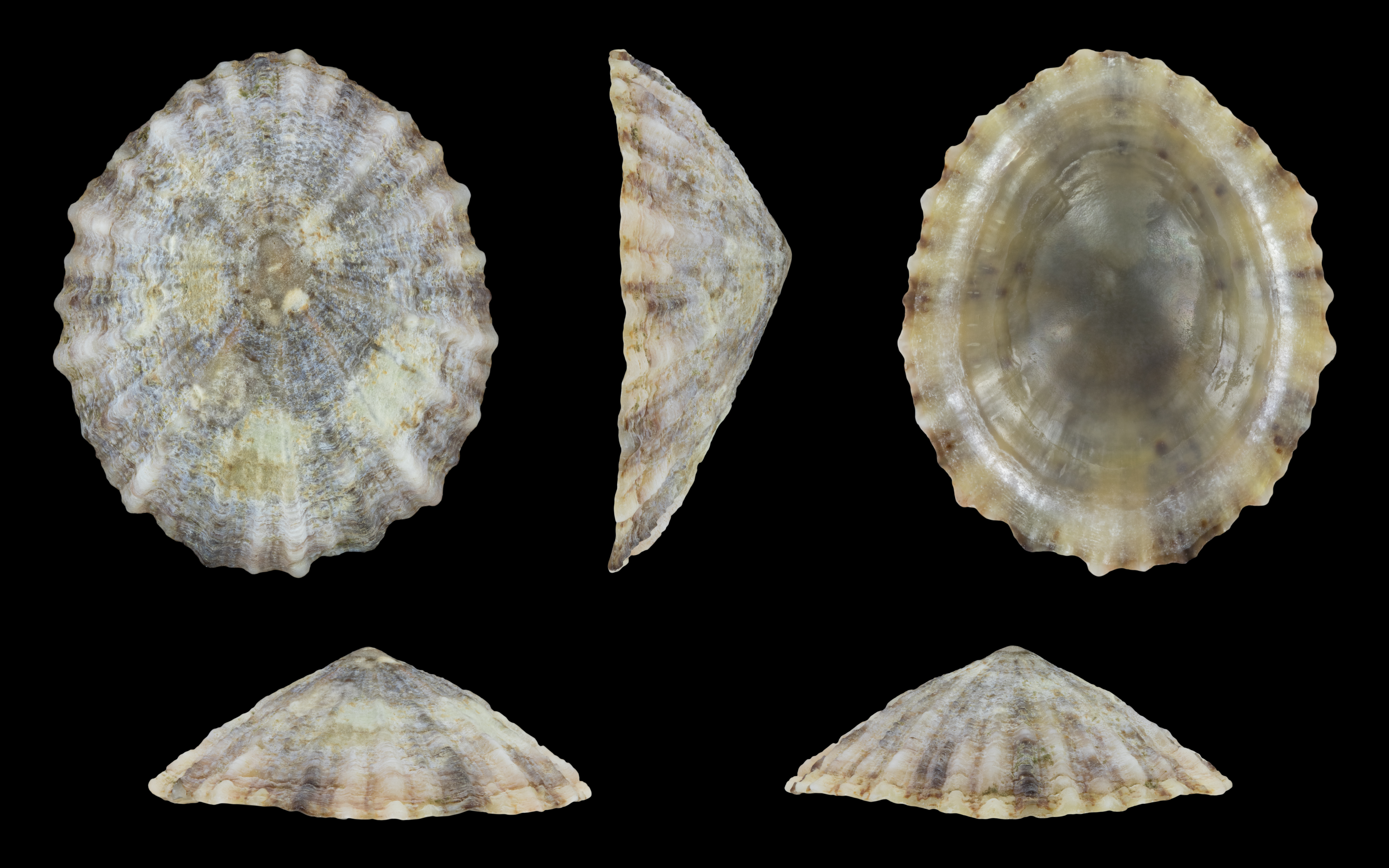

Scientific classification
- Kingdom: Animalia
- Phylum: Mollusca
- Class: Gastropoda
- Subclass: Patellogastropoda
- Family: Nacellidae
- Genus: Cellana
- Species: C. tramoserica

Binomial name
- Cellana tramoserica Holten, 1802

Synonyms
- Cellana variegata H.M.D. de Blainville, 1825; Cellana variegata ariel T. Iredale, 1924; Patella jacksonensis R.P. Lesson, 1831; Patella jacksoniensis R.P. Lesson, 1831

= Cellana tramoserica =

Species of gastropod

Cellana tramoserica is a species of marine gastropod mollusc (sea snail) in the family Nacellidae, one of the families of true limpets.

This marine species is native to Australia. Individuals in this species can grow up to 65 mm in length.

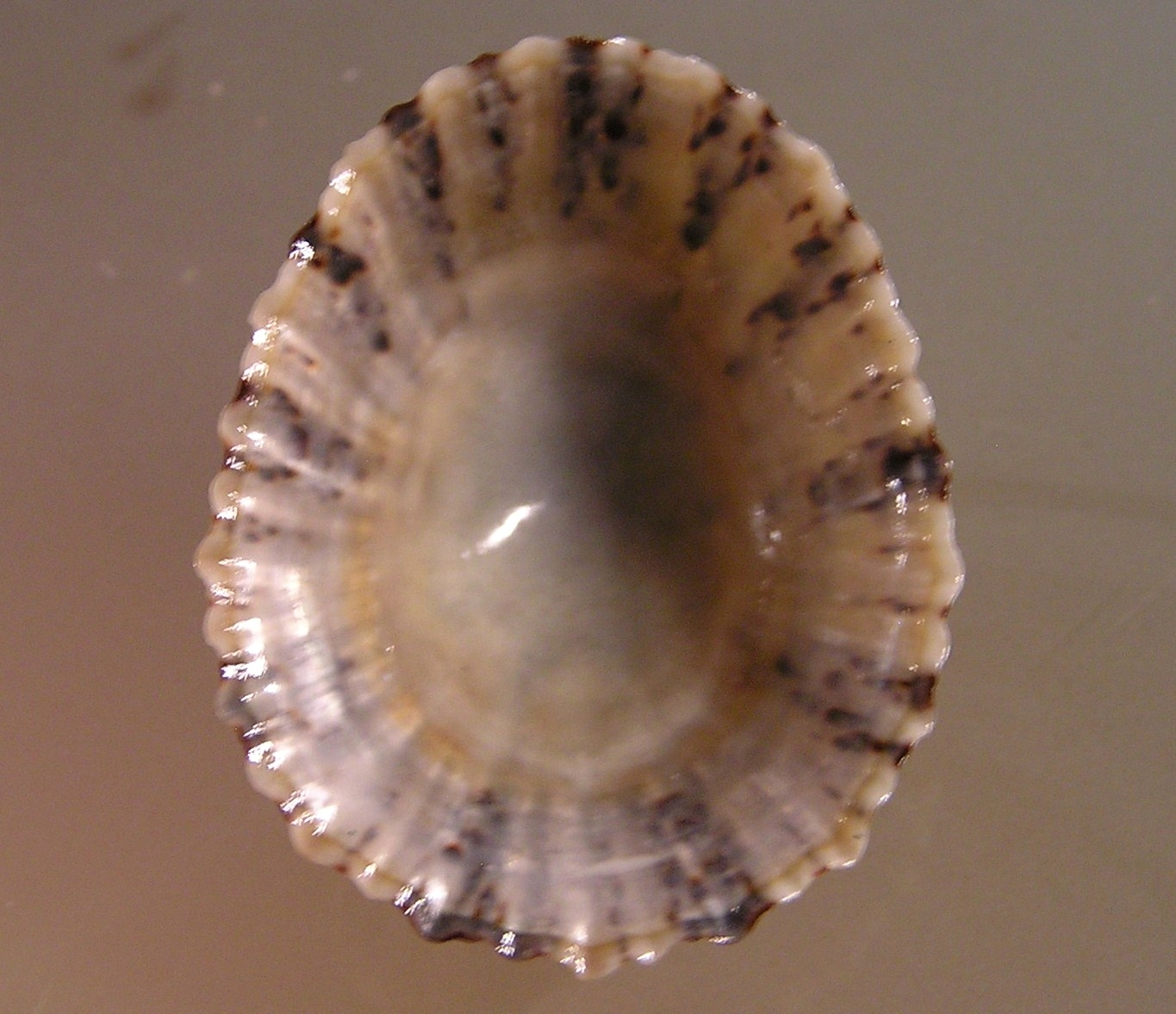
Cellana tramoserica, ventral view
