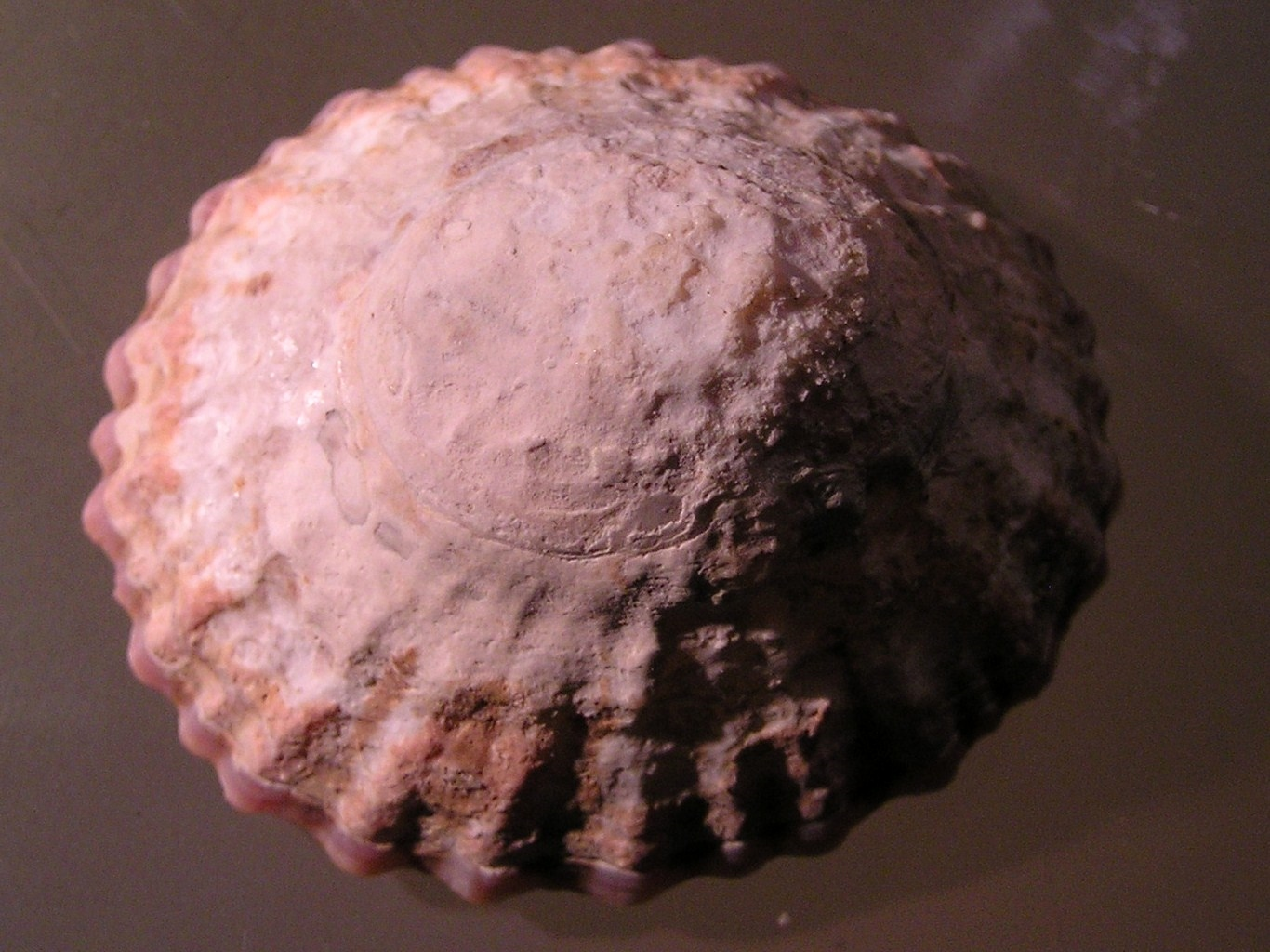

Scientific classification
- Kingdom: Animalia
- Phylum: Mollusca
- Class: Gastropoda
- Subclass: Patellogastropoda
- Family: Nacellidae
- Genus: Cellana
- Species: C. solida

Binomial name
- Cellana solida (Blainville, 1825)

= Cellana solida =

Species of gastropod

Cellana solida is the species of true limpet, a marine gastropod mollusc in the family Nacellidae.

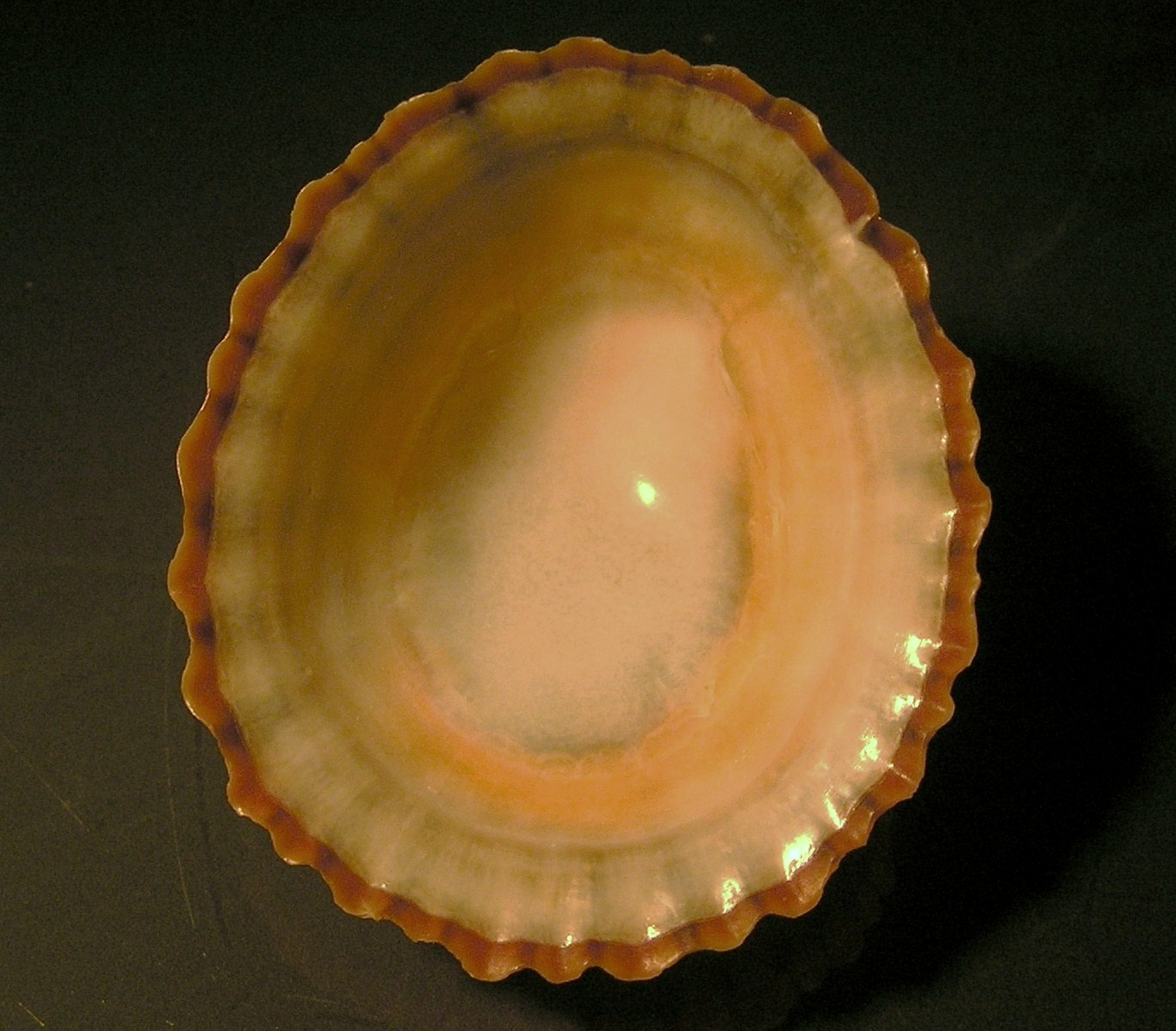
ventral view
