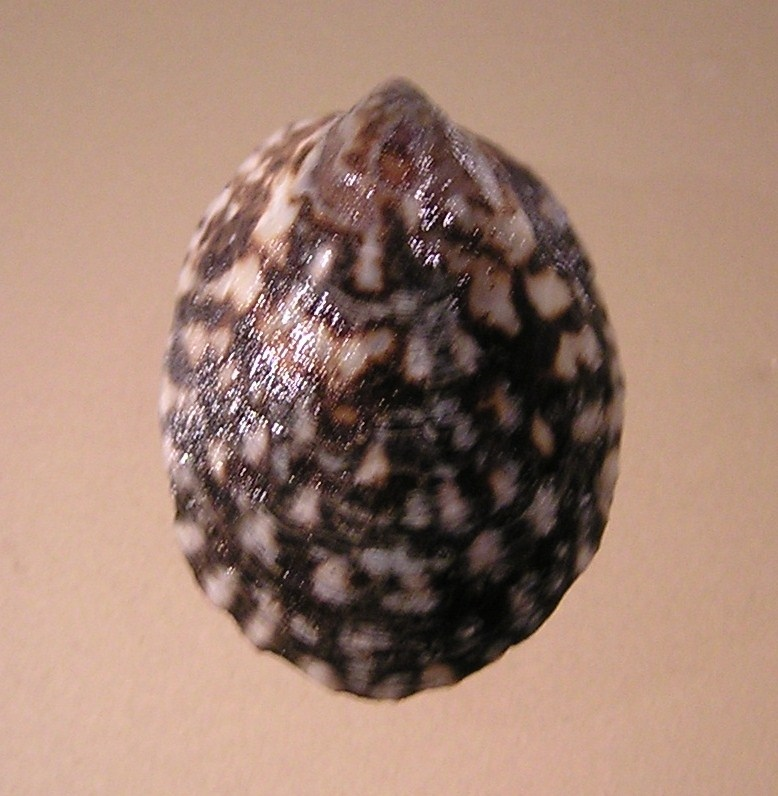

Conservation status
- Not Threatened (NZ TCS)

Scientific classification
- Kingdom: Animalia
- Phylum: Mollusca
- Class: Gastropoda
- Subclass: Patellogastropoda
- Superfamily: Lottioidea
- Family: Nacellidae
- Genus: Cellana
- Species: C. strigilis

Binomial name
- Cellana strigilis (Hombron & Jacquinot, 1841)

Synonyms
- Cellana strigilis flemingi Powell, 1955; Cellana strigilis redimiculum (Reeve, 1854); Cellana strigilis strigilis (Hombron & Jacquinot, 1841); Patella illuminata Gould, 1846; Patella pottsi Hutton, 1873; Patella redimiculum Reeve, 1854; Patella strigilis Hombron & Jacquinot, 1841 (original combination)

= Cellana strigilis =

Species of gastropod

Cellana strigilis is a species of large limpet, a marine gastropod mollusc in the family Nacellidae, one of the families of true limpets.

Baden Powell listed several subspecies in his 1979 New Zealand Mollusca, but these are no longer accepted.

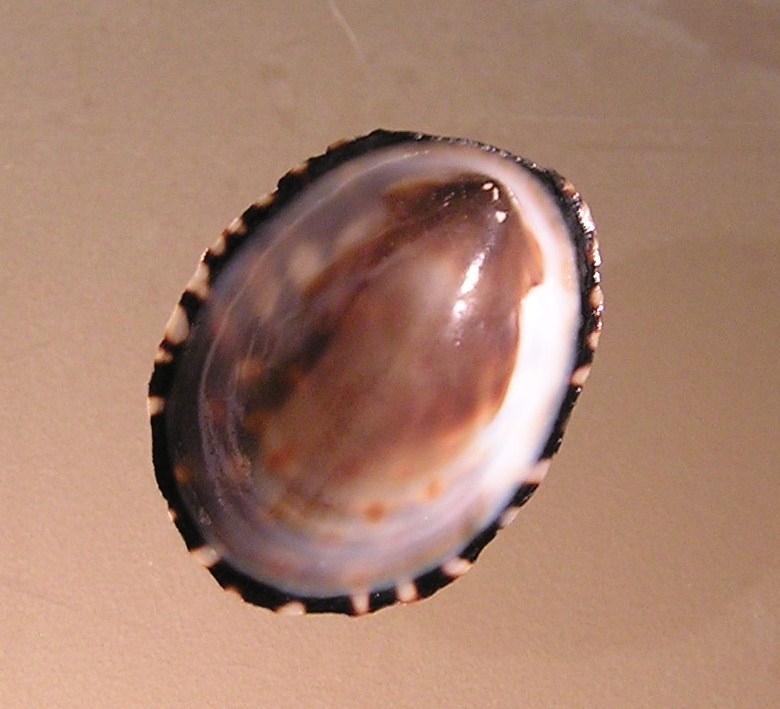
basal view

== Description ==
The shell attains a length of 80 mm, its width is 68 mm, and its height is 32 mm.

== Distribution ==
This marine species is endemic in New Zealand: Stewart Island, Foveaux Strait, and the east coast of the South Island up to Kaikōura. Also off Auckland, Snares Island, and Campbell Island.
