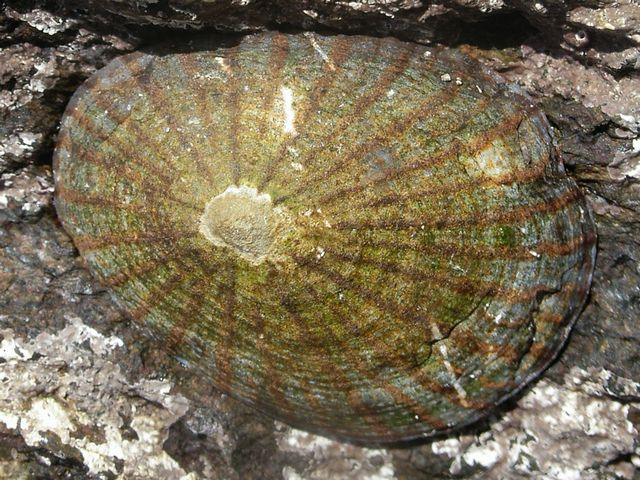

Scientific classification
- Kingdom: Animalia
- Phylum: Mollusca
- Class: Gastropoda
- Subclass: Patellogastropoda
- Family: Nacellidae
- Genus: Cellana
- Species: C. nigrolineata

Binomial name
- Cellana nigrolineata Reeve, 1854

Synonyms
- Bertinia bertinia Jousseaume, 1883; Patella nigrolineata Reeve, 1854

= Cellana nigrolineata =

Species of gastropod

Cellana nigrolineata is a species of sea snails or limpets, marine gastropod molluscs in the family Nacellidae, one of the families of true limpets.

This species of limpet lives on rocky shore in the intertidal zone. It occurs mainly along the northwestern coasts of the Pacific Ocean.

== Shell description ==
The typical size varies from 3 to 7 cm. The conical shells are almost flat and almost circular. The shell often has almost regular shell patterning of dark lines, similar in appearance to the mesh of the polar coordinate system.
