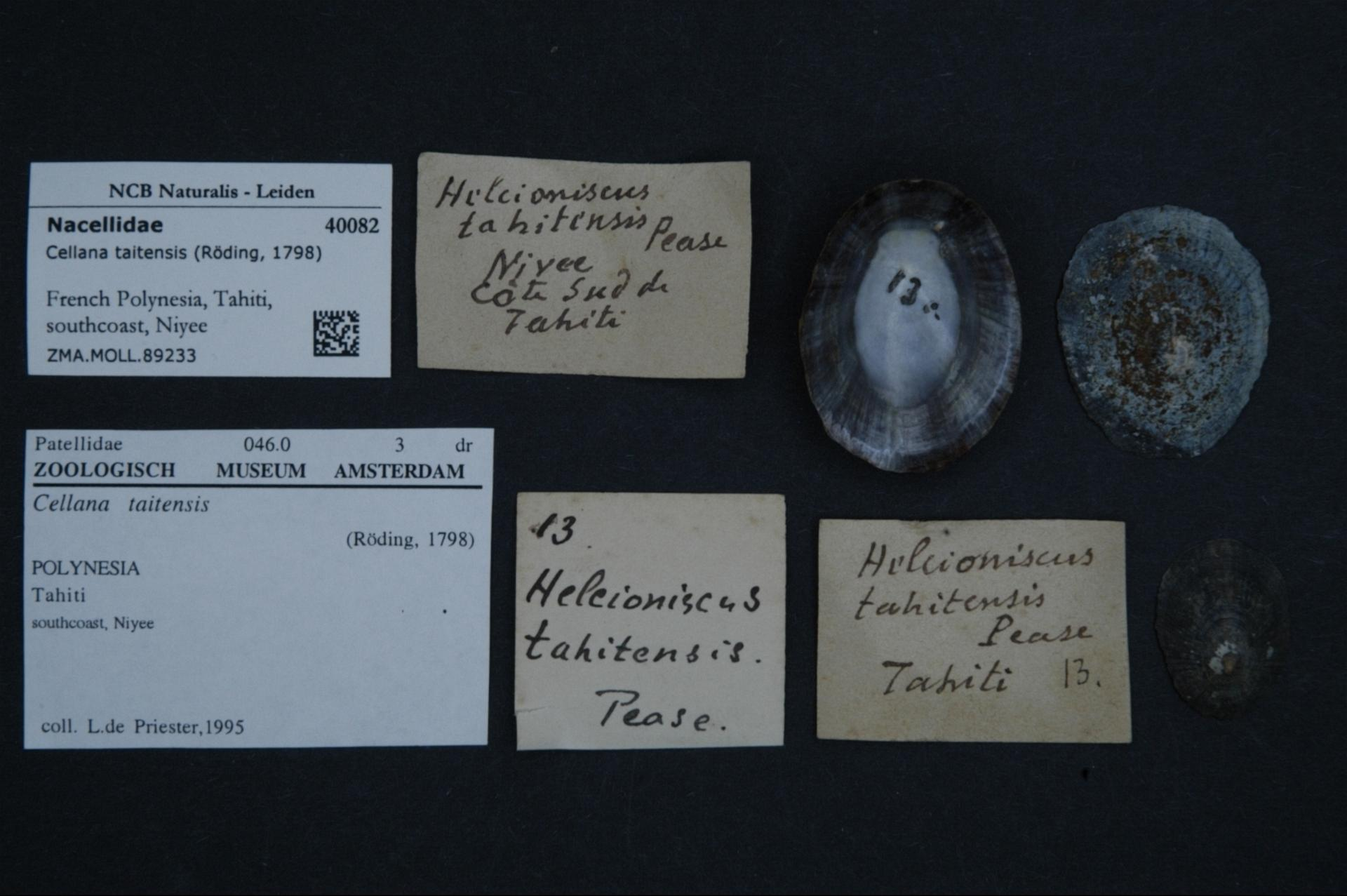

Scientific classification
- Kingdom: Animalia
- Phylum: Mollusca
- Class: Gastropoda
- Subclass: Patellogastropoda
- Family: Nacellidae
- Genus: Cellana
- Species: C. taitensis

Binomial name
- Cellana taitensis (Röding, 1798)

Synonyms
- Patella tahitica Curtiss, 1938; Tectura tahitensis Pease, 1868

= Cellana taitensis =

Species of gastropod

Cellana taitensis is a species of limpet, a marine gastropod mollusc in the family Nacellidae.

== Description ==
The shell size varies between 23 mm and 30 mm.

== Distribution ==
This species is distributed along French Polynesia and Pitcairn
