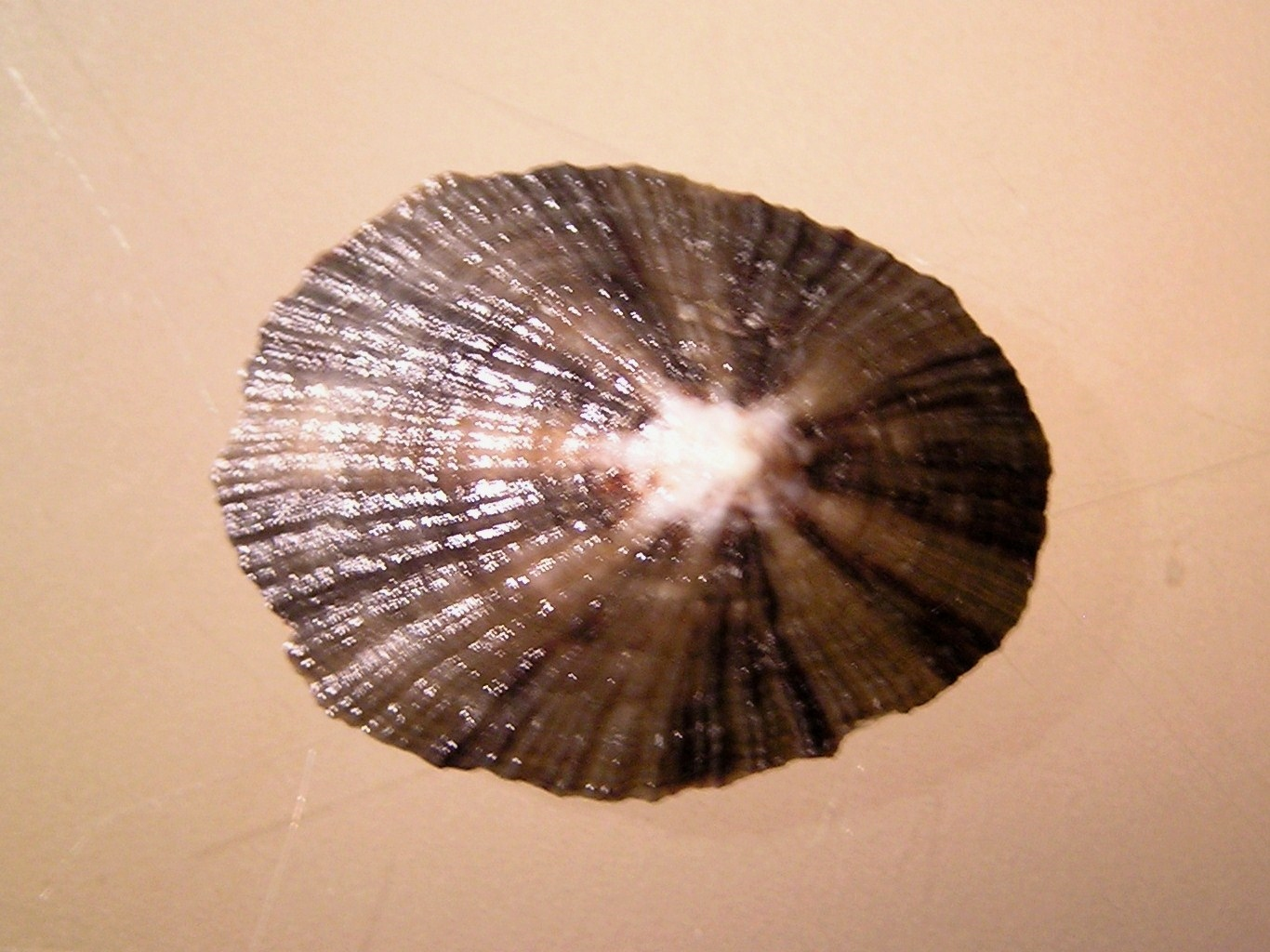

Scientific classification
- Kingdom: Animalia
- Phylum: Mollusca
- Class: Gastropoda
- Subclass: Patellogastropoda
- Family: Nacellidae
- Genus: Cellana
- Species: C. livescens

Binomial name
- Cellana livescens (Reeve, 1865)

Synonyms
- Cellana cernica (H. Adams, 1869); Cellana garconi (Deshayes, 1863); Helcioniscus livescens Reeve, 1855; Hemitoma livescens (Reeve, 1855); Nacella cernica H. Adams, 1869; Patella cernica (H. Adams, 1869); Patella garconi Deshayes, 1863; Patella livescens Reeve, 1855 (original combination); Patella novemradiata Quoy & Gaimard, 1834 (invalid: junior homonym of Patella novemradiata Fischer de Waldheim, 1805)

= Cellana livescens =

Species of gastropod

Cellana livescens is a species of sea snail, a marine gastropod mollusk in the family Nacellidae.

== Description ==
The length of the shell varies between 18 and 50 mm (0.71 and 1.97 in).

== Distribution ==
This marine species occurs off Madagascar, Aldabra, and the Mascarene Basin.

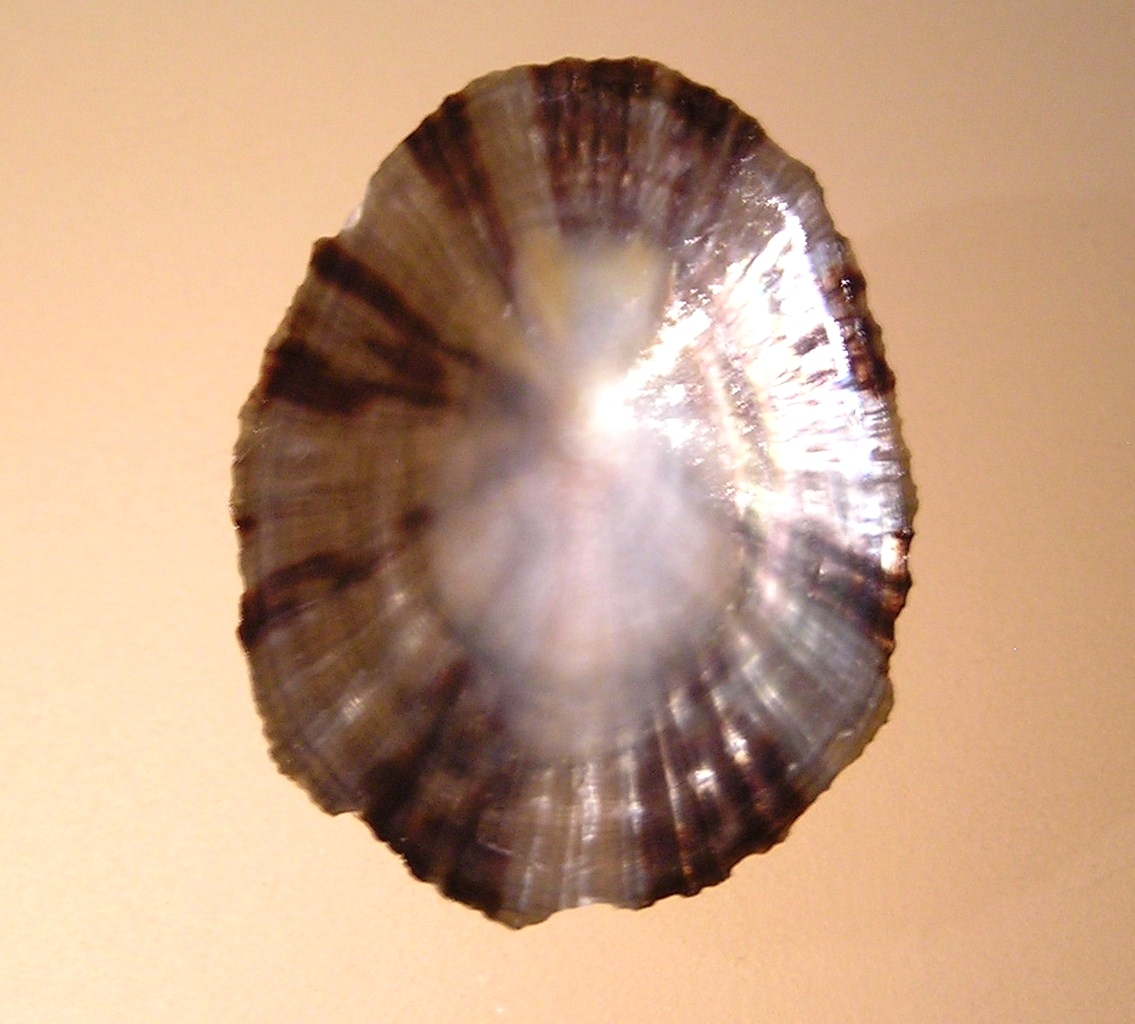
ventral view
