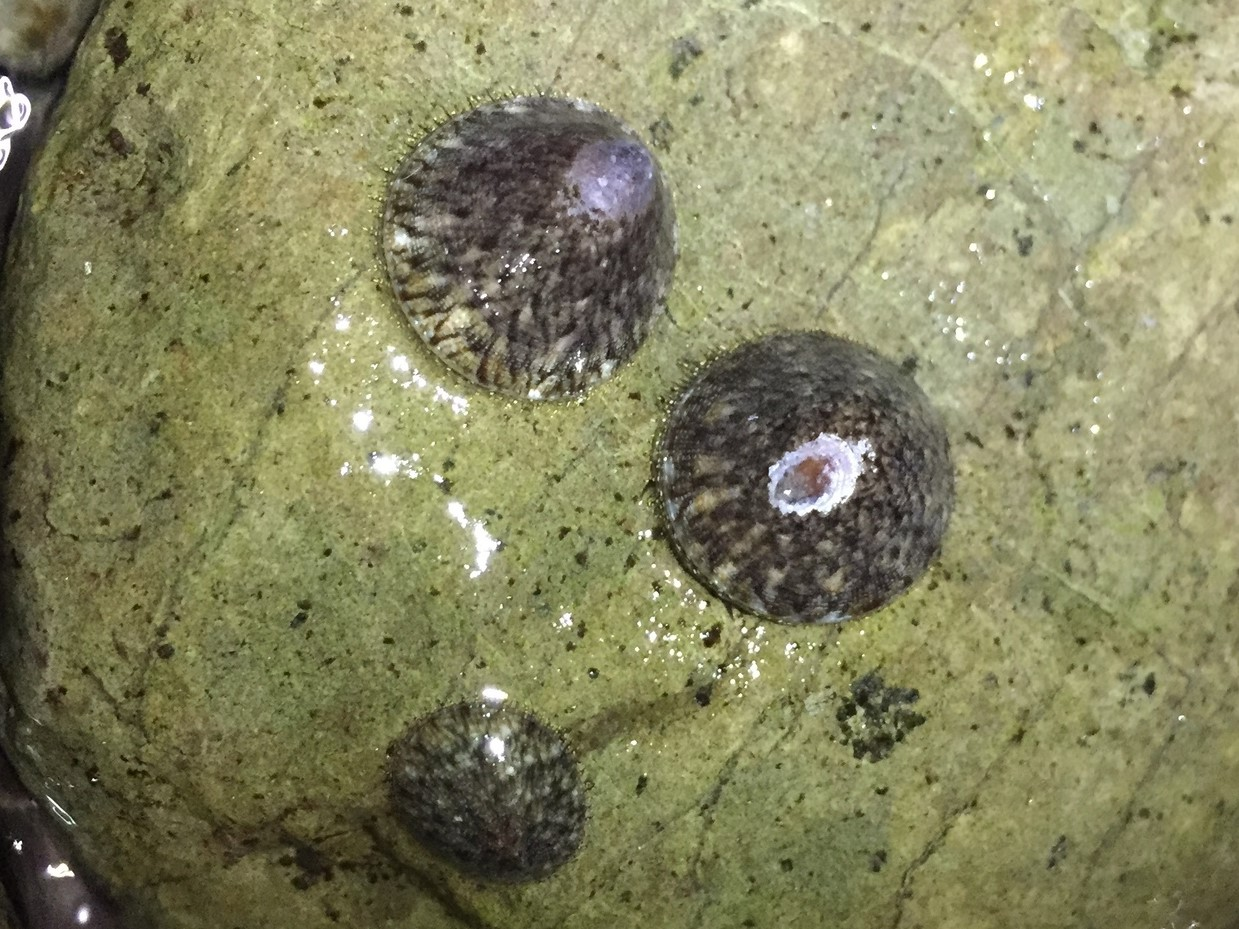

Scientific classification
- Kingdom: Animalia
- Phylum: Mollusca
- Class: Gastropoda
- Subclass: Patellogastropoda
- Family: Nacellidae
- Genus: Cellana
- Species: C. vitiensis

Binomial name
- Cellana vitiensis Powell, 1973

Synonyms
- Cellana sagitatta (Gould, 1846); Patella sagittata Gould, 1846

= Cellana vitiensis =

Species of gastropod

Cellana vitiensis is a species of limpet, a marine gastropod mollusc in the family Nacellidae, the true limpets.
