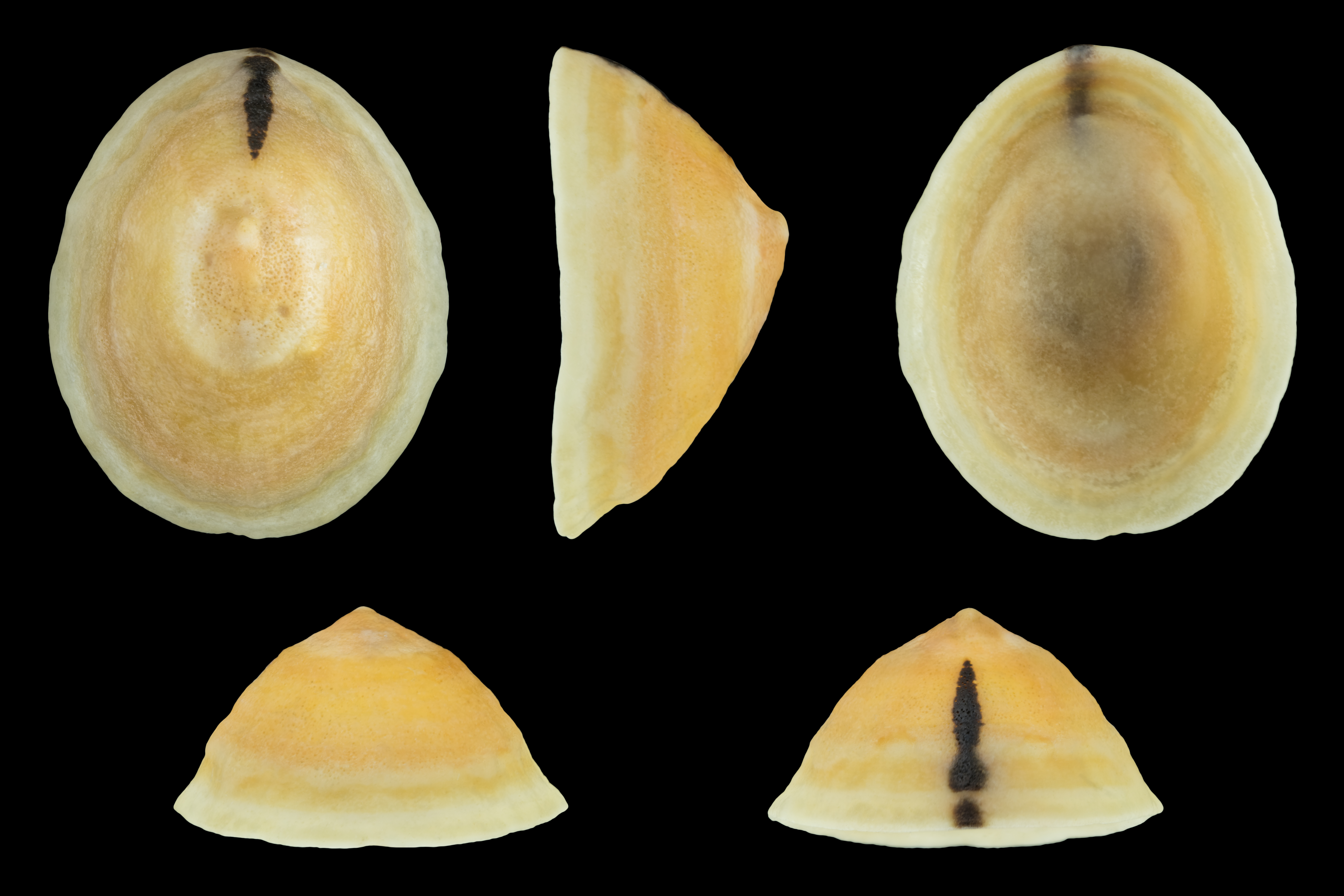

Conservation status
- Declining (NZ TCS)

Scientific classification
- Kingdom: Animalia
- Phylum: Mollusca
- Class: Gastropoda
- Subclass: Patellogastropoda
- Family: Nacellidae
- Genus: Cellana
- Species: C. flava

Binomial name
- Cellana flava (Martyn, 1784)

Synonyms
- Patella flava Hutton, 1873; Helcioniscus radians flavus Suter, 1913

= Cellana flava =

Species of gastropod

Cellana flava is a species of true limpet, a marine gastropod mollusc in the family Nacellidae, one of the families of true limpets.

This species is easily identified on the basis of the orange colour of its shell and the light coloured head and foot.

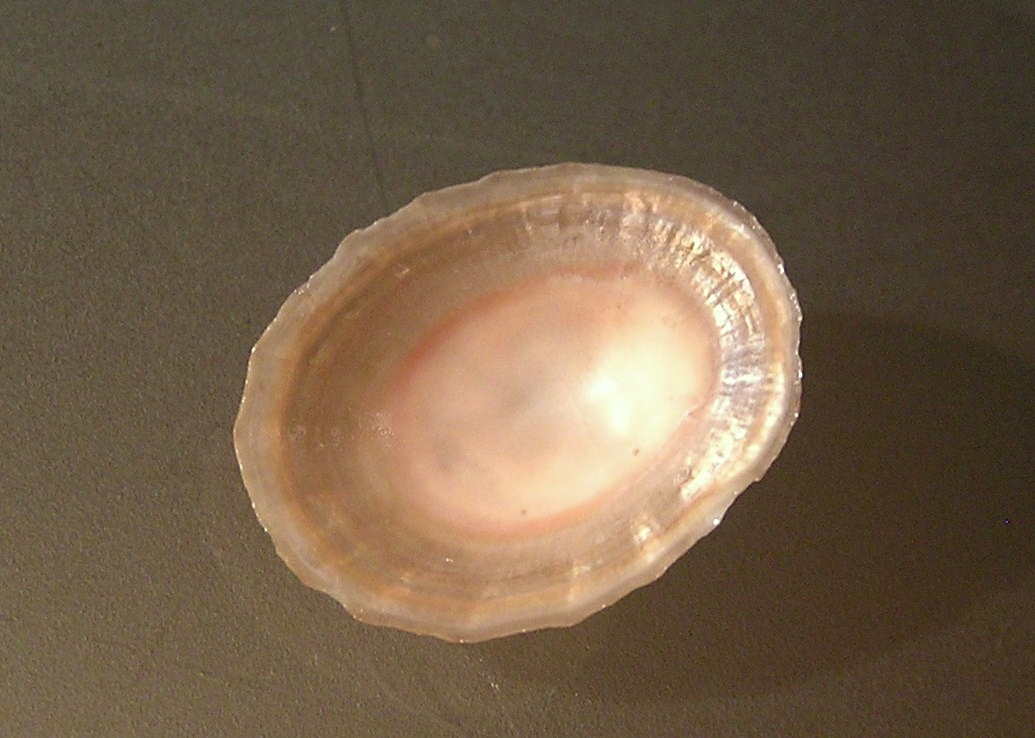
basal view
