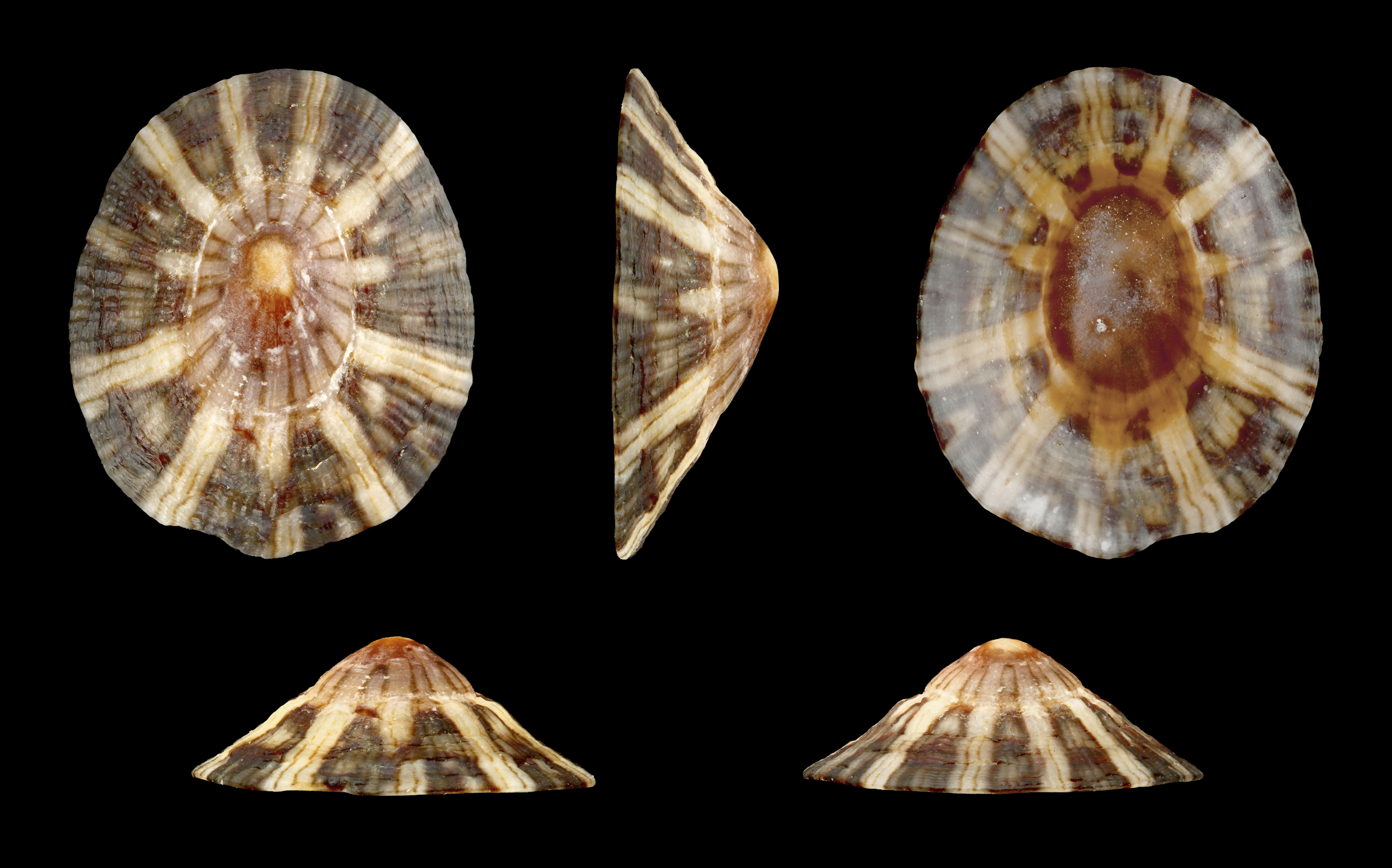
- Cellana radiata radiata

Scientific classification
- Kingdom: Animalia
- Phylum: Mollusca
- Class: Gastropoda
- Subclass: Patellogastropoda
- Family: Nacellidae
- Genus: Cellana
- Species: C. radiata

Binomial name
- Cellana radiata (Born, 1778)

Synonyms
- Acmaea travancorica Preston, 1911; Cellana travancorica Preston, 1911; Cellana bombayana Smith, E.A., 1911; Cellana reynauldi Deshayes, G.P., 1832; Cellana petalata Reeve, L.A., 1844; Patella aster Reeve, L.A., 1855; Patella luzonica Reeve, L.A., 1855; Patella nimbus Reeve, L.A., 1855; Patella rota Gmelin, J.F., 1791; Patella scalata Reeve, L.A., 1855

= Cellana radiata =

Species of gastropod

Cellana radiata (common name: the rayed wheel limpet), is a species of predatory sea snail, a marine gastropod mollusk in the family Nacellidae.

== Subspecies ==
- Cellana radiata capensis (Gmelin, 1791)
- Cellana radiata radiata (Born, 1778)
- Cellana radiata cylindrica Gmelin, 1791: synonym of Cellana cylindrica (Gmelin, 1791)
- Cellana radiata enneagona (L. A. Reeve, 1854) : synonym of Cellana enneagona (Reeve, 1854)
- Cellana radiata orientalis (H. A. Pilsbry, 1891) : synonym of Cellana radiata (Born, 1778)

== Description ==
The height of the flattened shell varies between 13 mm and 45 mm. The apex is slightly out of the middle and is often worn out. The shell has numerous, rather flat, granular ridges of varying height. The color of the shell is grayish white to dark brown, with the ribs somewhat darker. The interior is pale white and iridescent. The markings of the muscles contrast with a dark gray color.

== Distribution ==
This species is distributed in the Indo-Pacific, mainly Australia and can be found on rocks in littoral and sublittoral areas.
