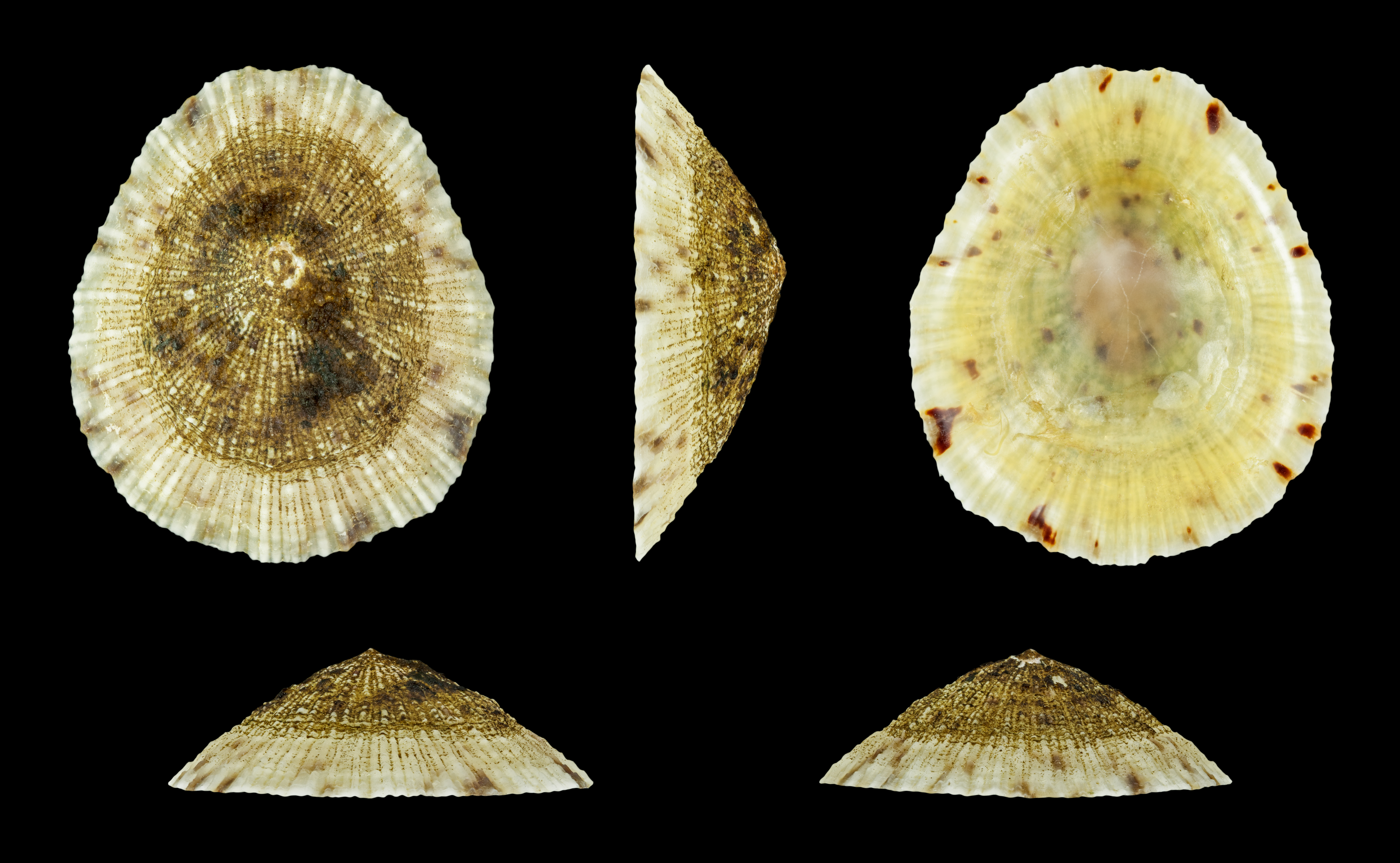

Scientific classification
- Kingdom: Animalia
- Phylum: Mollusca
- Class: Gastropoda
- Subclass: Patellogastropoda
- Family: Nacellidae
- Genus: Cellana
- Species: C. eucosmia

Binomial name
- Cellana eucosmia (Pilsbry, 1891)

Synonyms
- Helcioniscus eucosmia Pilsbry, 1892 (original combination); Patella variegata Reeve, 1854 (invalid: junior homonym of Patella variegata Röding, 1798, and several others)

= Cellana eucosmia =

Species of gastropod

Cellana eucosmia is a species of limpet, a marine gastropod mollusc in the family Nacellidae.

== Distribution ==
This species occurs in the Red Sea and in the Indian Ocean off Tanzania.
