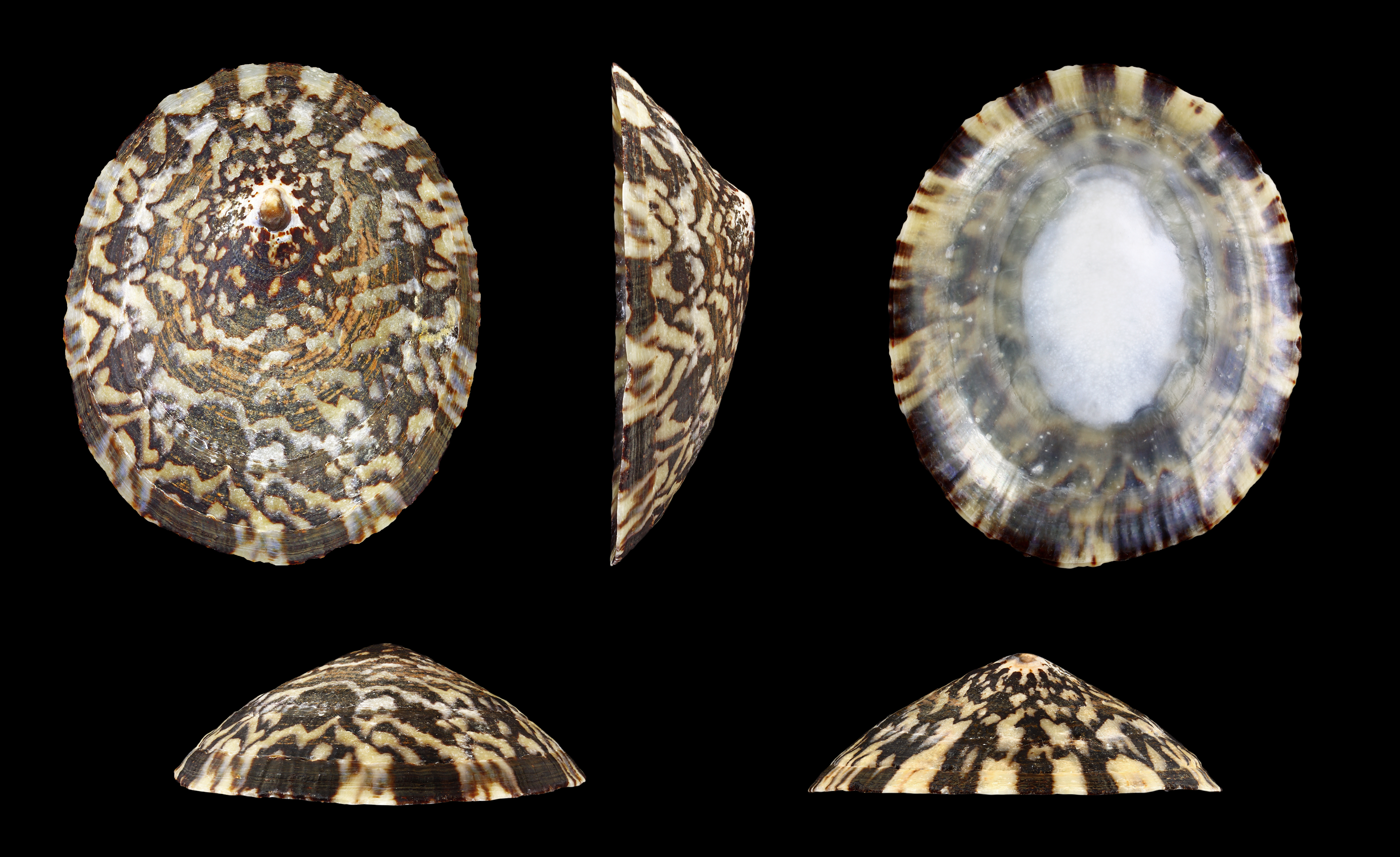

Scientific classification
- Kingdom: Animalia
- Phylum: Mollusca
- Class: Gastropoda
- Subclass: Patellogastropoda
- Family: Nacellidae
- Genus: Cellana
- Species: C. testudinaria

Binomial name
- Cellana testudinaria (Linnaeus, 1758)

Synonyms
- Helcioniscus mestayeri Suter, 1906; Patella testudinaria Linnaeus, 1758

= Cellana testudinaria =

Species of gastropod

Cellana testudinaria is a species of sea snail, a marine gastropod mollusk in the family Nacellidae.
