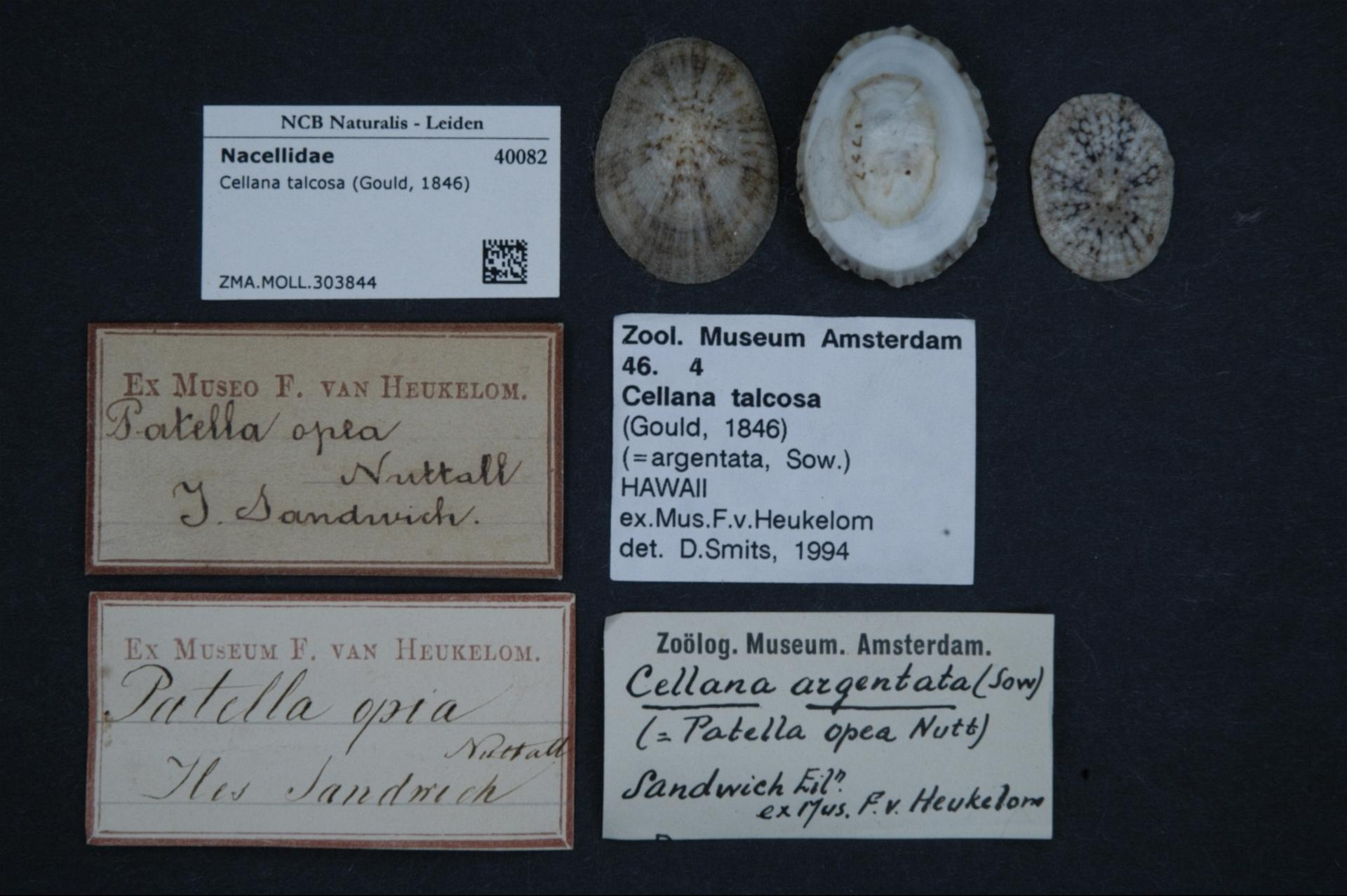

Scientific classification
- Kingdom: Animalia
- Phylum: Mollusca
- Class: Gastropoda
- Subclass: Patellogastropoda
- Family: Nacellidae
- Genus: Cellana
- Species: C. talcosa

Binomial name
- Cellana talcosa (A.A. Gould, 1846)

= Cellana talcosa =

Species of gastropod

Cellana talcosa, the talc limpet or turtle limpet is a species of true limpet, a marine gastropod mollusc in the family Nacellidae, which is one of the true limpet families. This species is endemic to the Hawaiian islands, where its common name is koele or opihi ko'ele. It is the largest limpet found in the Hawaiian islands and can reach 4 in (100 mm) in diameter.

== Description ==
Cellana talcosa is the largest limpet in Hawai'i, with a shell diameter of up to 4 in (100 mm). Its shell has a rounded, dome-like shape and is adorned with delicate, radiating ribs. The shell has usually a thick build and is often covered in crustose coralline algae. The interior of the shell is a pristine white, while the animal's foot boasting a vibrant yellow hue.

== Distribution and habitat ==
Cellana talcosa is endemic to the Hawaiian islands, though it is rarely seen west of Molokai. It can be found in the shallow waters of the lower intertidal zone, where it is submerged. This species is typically found on rocks that are frequently battered by powerful waves, up to 20 feet deep.

== Human use and cultural significance ==
For Hawaiians, the ʻopihi holds significant cultural importance as a favored food source, often consumed raw or boiled. In addition to its culinary uses, the ʻopihi shell was utilized as jewelry, plant fertilizer, and a tool for scraping mi, a type of edible taro root. While men were typically responsible for fishing on coral reefs and offshore waters, women and children collected various molluscs, sea urchins, and seaweeds from intertidal and nearshore areas, including the highly prized ʻopihi. However, gathering wild ʻopihi can be incredibly dangerous, and is primarily done by women. A Hawaiian proverb translates to "the ʻopihi is a fish of death," highlighting the risks involved in collecting this delicacy from its wave-swept rocky habitat.

In the past, Hawaiian ʻopihi collectors adhered to a set of regulations established by community resource managers known as konohiki. These regulations were designed to maintain robust ʻopihi populations by restricting the size, number, species, locations, and times of harvesting. Unfortunately, due to excessive harvesting and habitat degradation, ʻopihi populations have dwindled in modern-day Hawaiʻi.
