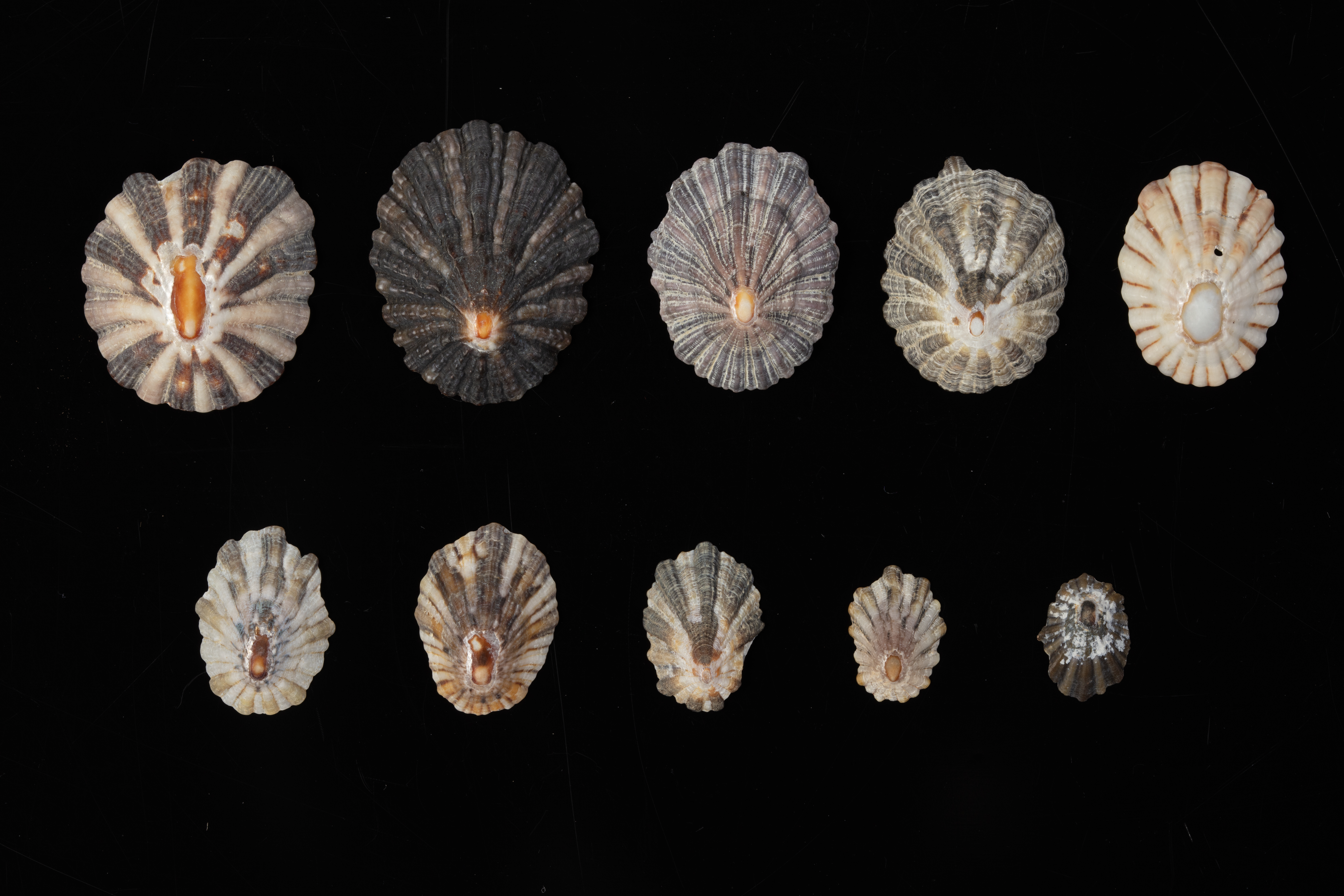
- Type specimens from the collections of the Auckland War Memorial Museum

Scientific classification
- Kingdom: Animalia
- Phylum: Mollusca
- Class: Gastropoda
- Subclass: Patellogastropoda
- Family: Nacellidae
- Genus: Cellana
- Species: C. craticulata

Binomial name
- Cellana craticulata (Suter, 1905)

= Cellana craticulata =

Species of gastropod

Cellana craticulata is a species of sea snail, a marine gastropod mollusk in the family Nacellidae, one of the families of true limpets.
