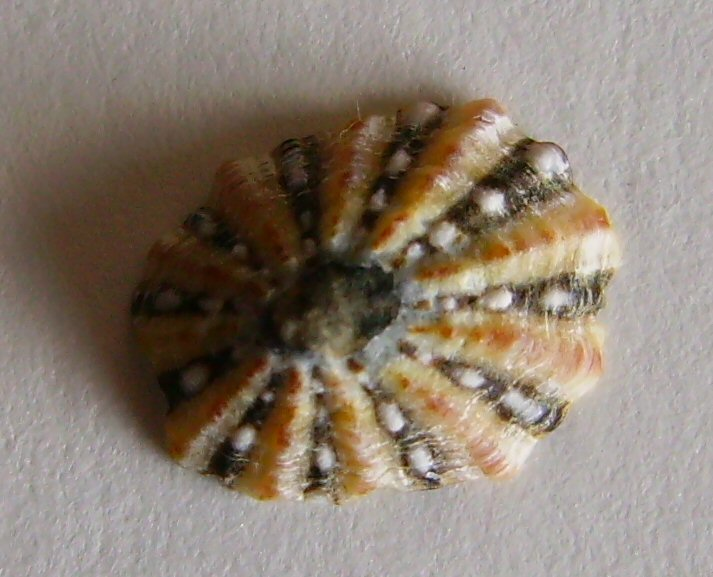
- A shell of Cellana ornata

Scientific classification
- Kingdom: Animalia
- Phylum: Mollusca
- Class: Gastropoda
- Subclass: Patellogastropoda
- Superfamily: Lottioidea
- Family: Nacellidae
- Genus: Cellana; Adams, 1869

Type species
- Nacella cernica Adams, 1869

Synonyms
- Bertinia Jousseaume, 1883; Granopatella Pallary, 1920; Helcion (Helcioniscus) Dall, 1871; Helcioniscus Dall, 1871; Nacella (Cellana) H. Adams, 1869 (original rank)

= Cellana =

Genus of molluscs

Cellana is a genus of sea snails or limpets, marine gastropod molluscs in the family Nacellidae, the true limpets.

== Distribution ==
This genus occurs in the temperate and tropical Indo-Pacific oceans, Hawaii (where they are known as ‘opihi and considered a delicacy) and around Australia and New Zealand. Species are also found around the coasts of Japan, the Red Sea, Mauritius, Madagascar, South Africa and the sub-Antartarctic Islands. One species, Cellana radiata, is cosmopolitan.

These sea snails feed by grazing on green macroalgae growing on rocky substrate in the intertidal zone. Some of these limpets can live up to 7 years, however most do not get older than 2–3 years. They reproduce by broadcasting their spawn in large, yolky eggs in great numbers (between 20,000 for C. flava and C. denticulata to 230,000 for C. ornata).

== Species ==
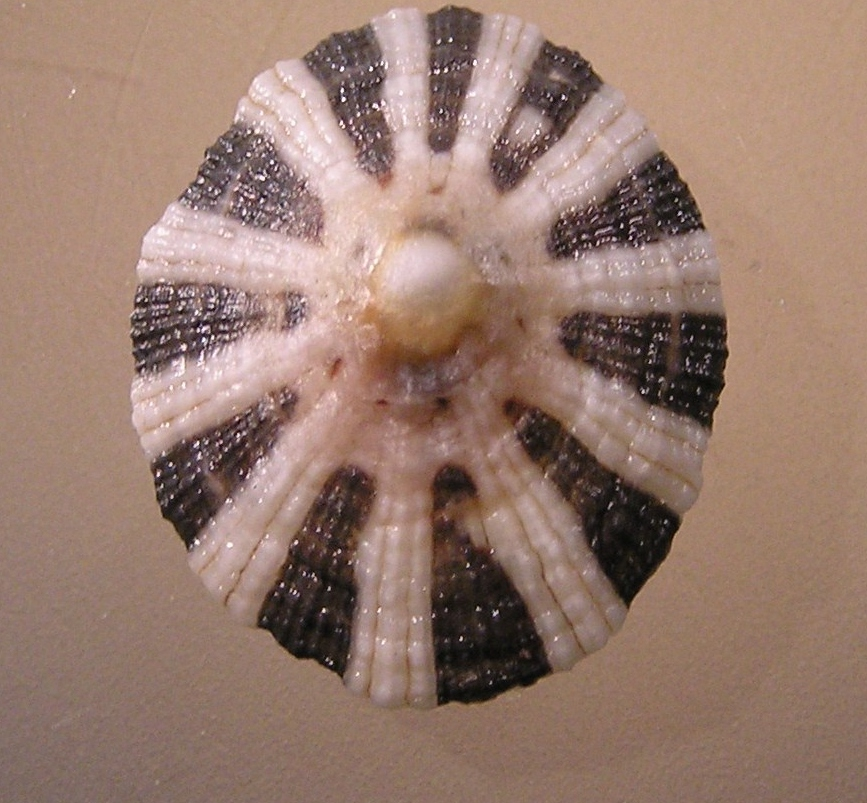
Cellana conciliata

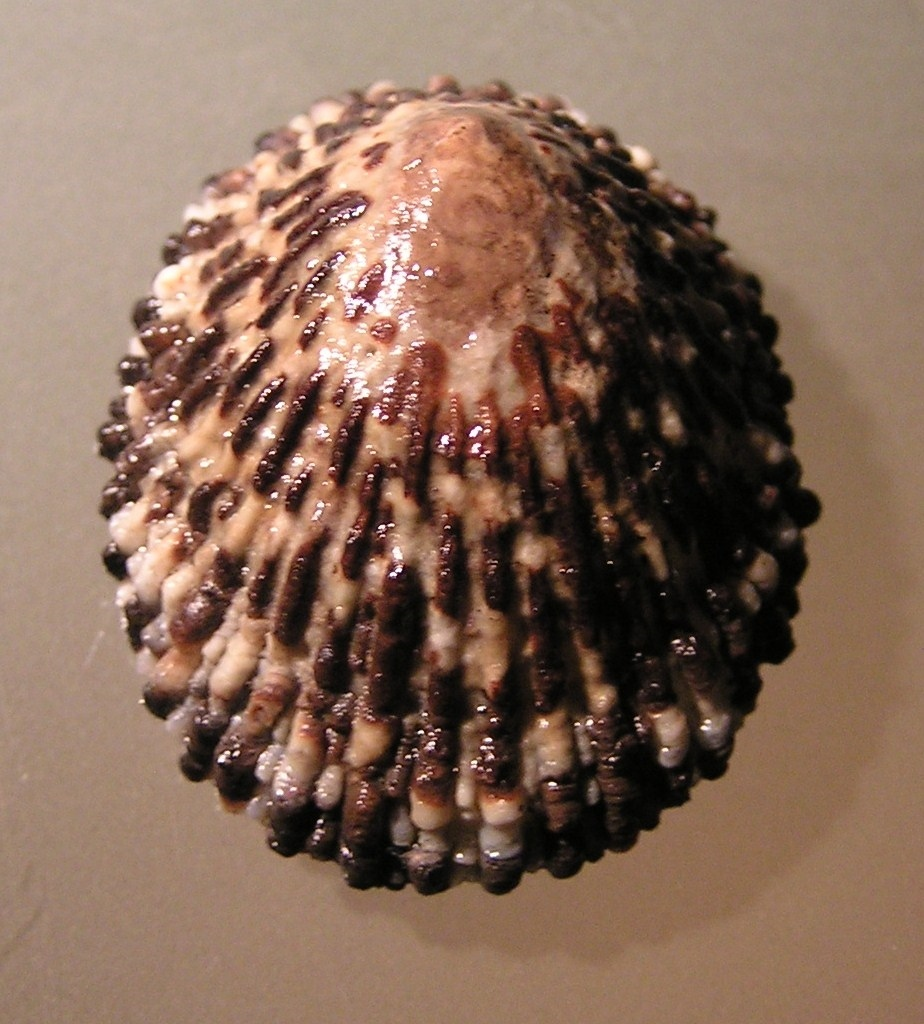
Cellana mazatlandica

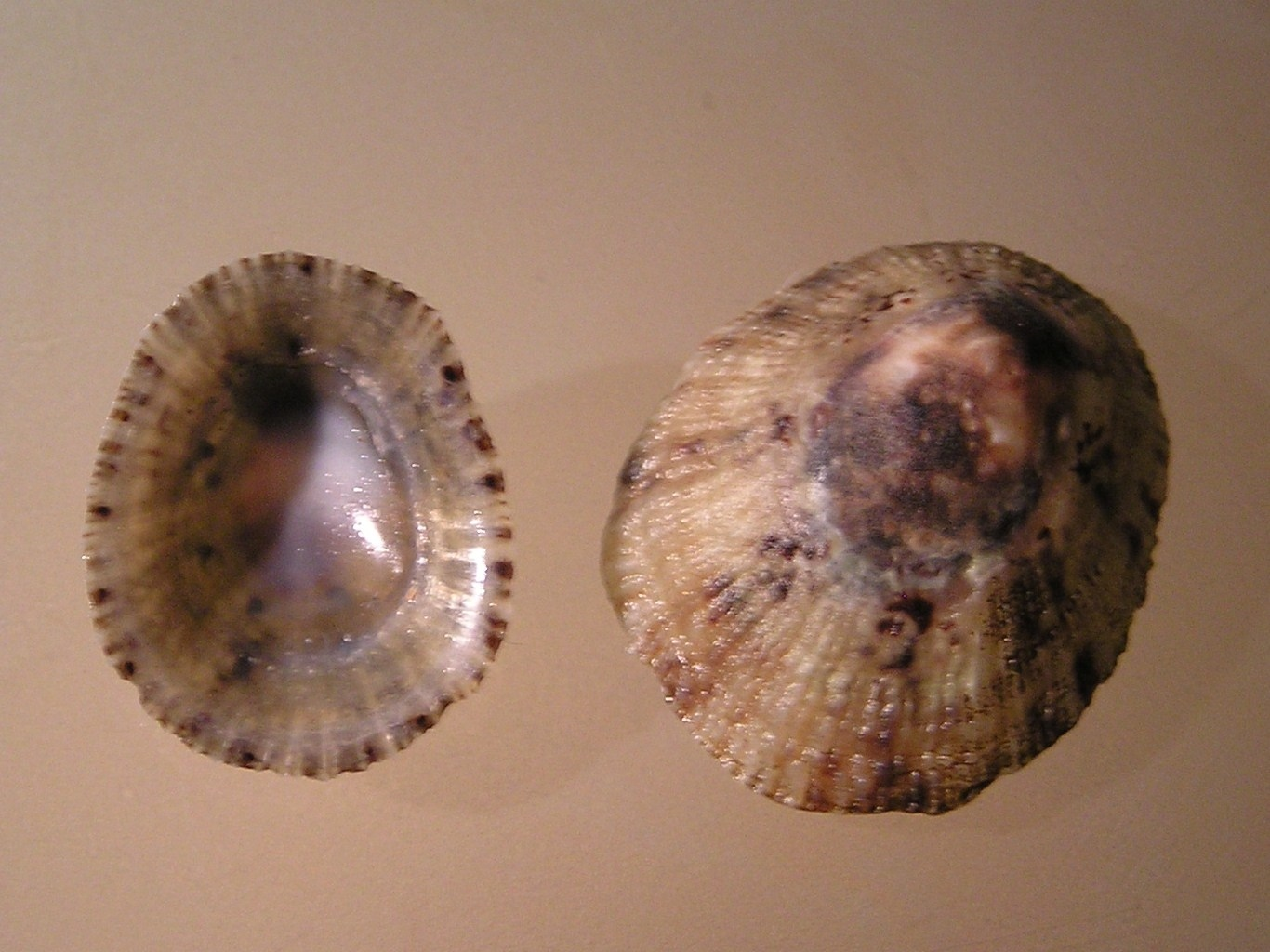
Cellana rota

Species within the genus Cellana include:

- Cellana analogia Iredale, 1940
- Cellana ardosiaea (Hombron & Jacquinot, 1841)
- † Cellana bosoensis Kase, T. Nakano, Kurihara & Haga, 2013
- Cellana capensis (Gmelin, 1791)
- † Cellana carpenteriana Skwarko, 1966
- Cellana conciliata Iredale, 1940 - Rainbow limpet
- † Cellana cophina Powell, 1973
- Cellana craticulata Suter, 1905
- † Cellana cudmorei Chapman & Gabriel, 1923
- Cellana cylindrica (Gmelin, 1791)
- † Cellana deformis (K. Martin, 1883)Powell
- Cellana denticulata Martyn, 1784
- Cellana dira (Reeve, 1855)
- Cellana enneagona (Reeve, 1854)
- Cellana eucosmia Pilsbry, 1891 (possibly synonym of C. grata)
- Cellana exarata - Hawaiian blackfoot opihi
- Cellana flava Hutton, 1873
- Cellana granostriata (Reeve, 1855)
- Cellana grata Gould, 1859
  - Cellana grata stearnsi Pilsbry, 1891
- † Cellana hentyi Chapman & Gabriel, 1923
- Cellana howensis Iredale, 1940 Indo-Pacific
- † Cellana igniculus Kase, T. Nakano, Kurihara & Haga, 2013
- † Cellana kamatakiensis Kase, T. Nakano, Kurihara & Haga, 2013
- Cellana karachiensis Winckworth, 1930 Red Sea
- † Cellana kobayashii Kase, T. Nakano, Kurihara & Haga, 2013
- Cellana livescens (Reeve, 1855)
- Cellana mazatlandica Sowerby, 1839
- Cellana melanostoma Pilsbry, 1891
- Cellana nigrolineata Reeve, 1854
- Cellana oliveri Powell, 1955
- Cellana orientalis (Pilsbry, 1891)
- Cellana ornata Dillwyn, 1817
- Cellana pricei Powell, 1973
- Cellana radians (Gmelin, 1791)
- Cellana radiata I. von Born, 1778
  - Cellana radiata capensis (Gmelin, 1791)
  - Cellana radiata radiata (Born, 1778)
- Cellana rota (Gmelin, 1791)
- Cellana sandwicensis (Pease, 1861)
- Cellana solida Blainville, 1825
- Cellana sontica Iredale, 1940
- Cellana stellifera Gmelin, 1791
- Cellana strigilis Powell, 1955
  - Cellana strigilis strigilis Hombron & Jacquinot, 1841
  - Cellana strigilis bollonsi Powell, 1955
  - Cellana strigilis chathamensis (Pilsbry, 1891)
  - Cellana strigilis flemingi Powell, 1955
  - Cellana strigilis oliveri Powell, 1955
  - Cellana strigilis redimiculum (Reeve, 1854)
- † Cellana taberna Powell, 1973
- Cellana taitensis Röding, 1798
- Cellana talcosa Gould, 1846
- Cellana testudinaria (Linnaeus, 1758)
- † Cellana thomsoni Powell & Bartrum, 1929
- Cellana toreuma Reeve, 1855
- Cellana tramoserica Holten, 1802
- Cellana turbator Iredale, 1940
- Cellana vitiensis Powell, 1973
- † Cellana yamamotoi Kase, T. Nakano, Kurihara & Haga, 2013

The sources given below, also mention the following species :

- Cellana ampla
- Cellana ardosioea Hombron & Jacquinot, 1841
- Cellana argentata Sowerby, 1839
- Cellana enneagona Reeve, 1854
- Cellana nigrisquamata Reeve, 1854
  - Cellana profunda mauritiana Pilsbry, 1891

Species brought into synonymy

- Cellana capensis (Gmelin, 1791): synonym of Cellana radiata (Born, 1778)
- Cellana cernica (Adams, 1869): synonym of Cellana livescens (Reeve, 1855)
- Cellana eudora Iredale, 1940: synonym of Cellana radiata orientalis (Pilsbry, 1891)
- Cellana garconi (Deshayes, 1863): synonym of Cellana livescens (Reeve, 1855)
- Cellana hedleyi W. R. B. Oliver, 1915: synonym of Cellana craticulata (Suter, 1905)
- Cellana laticostata (Blainville, 1825): synonym of Scutellastra laticostata (Blainville, 1825)
- Cellana sagittata A. A. Gould, 1846 : synonym of Cellana vitiensis Powell, 1973
- Cellana scopulina W. R. B. Oliver, 1926: synonym of Cellana craticulata (Suter, 1905)
- Cellana vulcanicus W. R. B. Oliver, 1915: synonym of Cellana craticulata (Suter, 1905)
