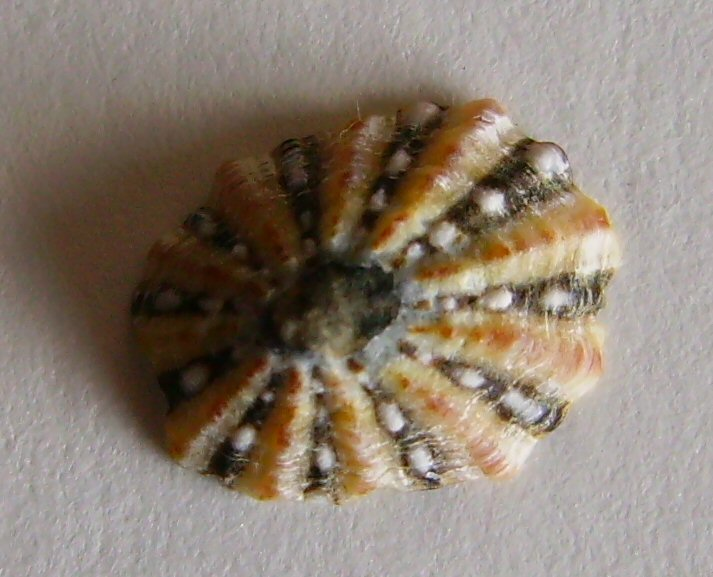
- A shell of Cellana ornata

Scientific classification
- Kingdom: Animalia
- Phylum: Mollusca
- Class: Gastropoda
- Subclass: Patellogastropoda
- Family: Nacellidae
- Genus: Cellana
- Species: C. ornata

Binomial name
- Cellana ornata (Dillwyn, 1817)

Synonyms
- Patella luctuosa Gould, 1846; Patella margaritaria Reeve, 1855; Patella nodosa Hombron & Jacquinot, 1841; Patella ornata Dillwyn, 1817

= Cellana ornata =

Species of gastropod

Cellana ornata is a species of true limpet, a marine gastropod mollusc in the family Nacellidae, one of the families of true limpets.

== Distribution ==
This marine species occurs off New Zealand.
