= Thomas Martyn (zoologist) =

English zoologist and entomologist (1760–1816)

- Born: 1760 (probably); Coventry (probably)
- Died: 1816, aged about 56
- Known for: The Universal Conchologist
- Scientific career
- Fields: Zoology, conchology, entomology

Thomas Martyn (probably 1760 – 1816) was an English zoologist, conchologist and entomologist. There is a botanist of the same name who lived in the same period.

== Life ==
Little is known about Thomas Martyn's life, and nothing is known about his parents, his wife and his children. It is believed that he was born in 1760 in Coventry. Later he lived at several addresses in London. At 10 Great Marlborough Street, Westminster he established an academy for the painting of Natural History. Besides English, Martyn spoke French and Latin.

== Works ==
In 1784, Martyn started his major work, The Universal Conchologist, which he completed and published in London in 1784, dedicating it to the King. His publications included:

- Hints of important Uses to be derived from Aerostatic Globes. With a Print of an Aerostatic Globe … originally designed in 1783, 1784.
- The Universal Conchologist, exhibiting the figure of every known Shell, with second title Figures of non-descript Shells collected in the different Voyages to the South Seas since the year 1764, 1784, 4 vols. in French and English, including descriptions of British collections and forty coloured plates.
- The Soldiers and Sailors' Friend, 1786, a pamphlet suggesting a national assessment for the maintenance of superannuated and disabled soldiers and sailors.
- A short Account of the Nature, Principle, and Progress of a Private Establishment …, 1789, in French and English, an account of Martyn's academy of painting.
- The English Entomologist, exhibiting all the Coleopterous Insects found in England, including upwards of five hundred different Species, the Figures of which have never before been given to the Public … Drawn and Painted after Nature, arranged and named according to the Linnean System, … at his Academy for Illustrating and Painting Natural History, 1792.
- Aranei, or a Natural History of Spiders …, 1793, with a coloured frontispiece and seventeen plates; the preface states that the editor purchased Eleazar Albin's original drawings at the sale of the Duchess Dowager of Portland's Museum.
- Figures of Plants, 1795; forty-three plates of exotics without names or other imprints.
- Psyche: Figures of non-descript Lepidopterous Insects …, 1797, with thirty-two plates, containing ninety-six figures with scientific descriptions supplied in the manuscript.
- A Dive into Buonaparte's Councils on his projected Invasion of old England, 1804.
- Great Britain's Jubilee Monitor and Briton's Mirror … of their most sacred Majesties George III and Charlotte his Queen, 1810.

Martyn edited Natural System of Colours by Moses Harris, 1811, with a dedication to Benjamin West.
