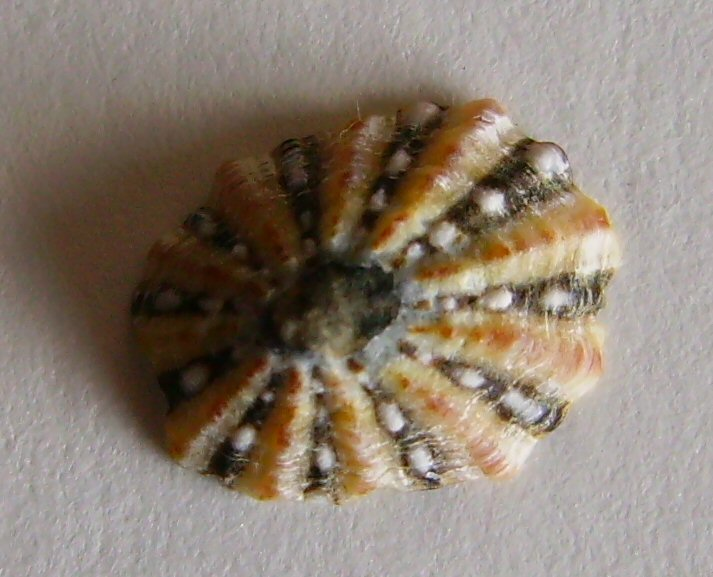
- A shell of Cellana ornata

Scientific classification
- Kingdom: Animalia
- Phylum: Mollusca
- Class: Gastropoda
- Subclass: Patellogastropoda
- Superfamily: Lottioidea
- Family: Nacellidae; Thiele, 1891

Genera
- See text

Synonyms
- Bertiniidae Jousseaume, 1883

= Nacellidae =

Family of gastropods

Nacellidae is a taxonomic family of sea snails or true limpets, marine gastropod molluscs in the subclass Patellogastropoda.

== Taxonomy ==
Nacellidae was the only family in the superfamily Nacelloidea as described by Bouchet & Rocroi (2005),. However a molecular phylogenetic study of Patellogastropoda by Nakano & Ozawa (2007) found that Nacellidae was recovered within Lottioidea, as shown in the following cladogram:

- Patellogastropoda
  - - - Lottiidae (including Acmaea and Niveotectura)
      - - - Pectinodontidae
          - Lepetidae
        - Nacellidae
    - Patellidae
  - Eoacmaeidae

As a result Nacellidae was moved to Lottioidea in the taxonomic revision of Bouchet et al (2017). More recently, a recent phylogenomic study found Nacellidae as a sister to Patellidae, which suggests that Nacellidae should be transferred to Patelloidea.

== Genera ==
Genera within the family Nacellidae include:

- Cellana H. Adams, 1869
- Naccula Iredale, 1924
- Nacella Schumacher, 1817 - type genus
- Macclintockia Gould, 1846: taxon inquirendum
  - - one species Macclintockia scabra (Gould, 1846): synonym of Lottia scabra (Gould, 1846)
