= Cymbula sanguinans =

Scientific classification
- Kingdom: Animalia
- Phylum: Mollusca
- Class: Gastropoda
- Subclass: Patellogastropoda
- Family: Patellidae
- Genus: Cymbula
- Species: C. sanguinans

Binomial name
- Cymbula sanguinans (Reeve, 1854)

Synonyms
- Patella alboguttata W.H. Turton, 1932; Patella densistriata W.H. Turton, 1932; Patella miniata sanguinans Reeve, 1856; Patella sanguinans Reeve, 1854

Species of gastropod

Cymbula sanguinans, the giant pinkray limpet, is a species of giant limpet, a marine mollusc in the family Patellidae. It is native to the coast of South Africa. At one time thought to be a subspecies of Cymbula miniata, molecular analysis has shown C. sanguinans warrants being treated as a full species, despite there being no obvious morphological differences between the two. This makes difficult the task of deciding which of the previous research studies refer to C. sanguinans, and which refer to C. miniata.

== Description ==
Cymbula sanguinans is a very large limpet, with a shell length that can exceed 10 cm (4 in), but most individuals are rather smaller than this. The shell is oval, with the highest point of the cone about one third of the distance from the anterior end. The external surface has fine sculpturing and is cream-coloured with radial bands and streaks in brown or pinkish-brown; the interior is a similar colour, with a whitish muscle scar.

== Ecology ==
Cymbula sanguinans is a herbivore and grazes on algae, being completely dependent on feeding on the thalloid red alga, Hildenbrandia rubra. It is a territorial species, tending a patch of algae and driving away other limpets.

== Status ==
Cymbula sanguinans is endemic to the coasts of South Africa, where it has been found in the intertidal zone in the East London area, and on the Transkei coast. Giant limpets are frequently impacted by human activities, including pollution, loss of habitat, and being collected for food. They have been eaten since prehistoric times as is attested by the presence of the empty shells in shell middens. The largest individuals tend to be gathered preferentially, and because these limpets are protandric hermaphrodites, it is the females that are selectively removed. Few eggs mean little recruitment, and populations are dwindling, with several species of giant limpet being threatened with extinction.
