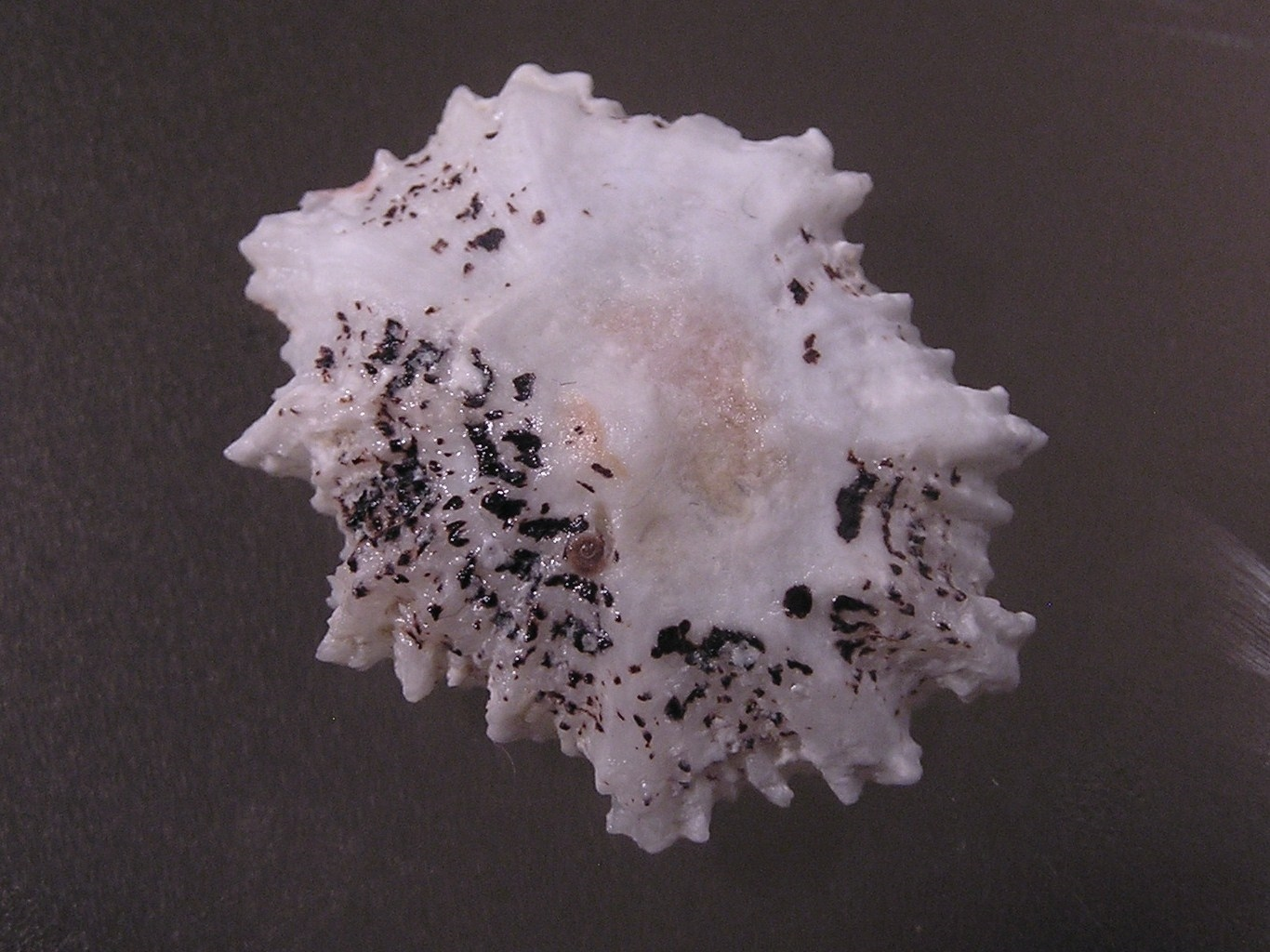

Scientific classification
- Kingdom: Animalia
- Phylum: Mollusca
- Class: Gastropoda
- Subclass: Patellogastropoda
- Superfamily: Patelloidea
- Family: Patellidae
- Genus: Scutellastra
- Species: S. flexuosa

Binomial name
- Scutellastra flexuosa (Quoy & Gaimard, 1834)

Synonyms
- Patella (Ancistromesus) stellaeformis Reeve, 1842; Patella (Scutellastra) stellaeformis Reeve, 1842; Patella alba Hombron & Jacquinot, 1841 (invalid: junior homonym of Patella alba da Costa, 1771); Patella cretacea Reeve, 1854; Patella flexuosa Quoy & Gaimard, 1834; Patella moreli Deshayes, 1863; Patella paumotensis Gould, 1846; Patella stellaeformis Reeve, 1842; Patella stellaeformis tuamutuensis Dautzenberg & Bouge, 1933; Patella tara Prashad & Rao, 1934; Penepatella inquisitor Iredale, 1929 (junior synonym)

= Scutellastra flexuosa =

Species of gastropod

Scutellastra flexuosa is a species of sea snail, a true limpet, a marine gastropod mollusc in the family Patellidae, one of the families of true limpets. They are historically found in the Pacific and Indian Oceans.

== Description ==
The length of the shell attains 25.4 mm. It is octagonal to circular or elongate-ovate, with a central apex containing 8 or 9 radial folds. The shell is sculptured with many spinose cords.

== Distribution ==
This marine species occurs off Mauritius and Vanikoro (Solomon Island).

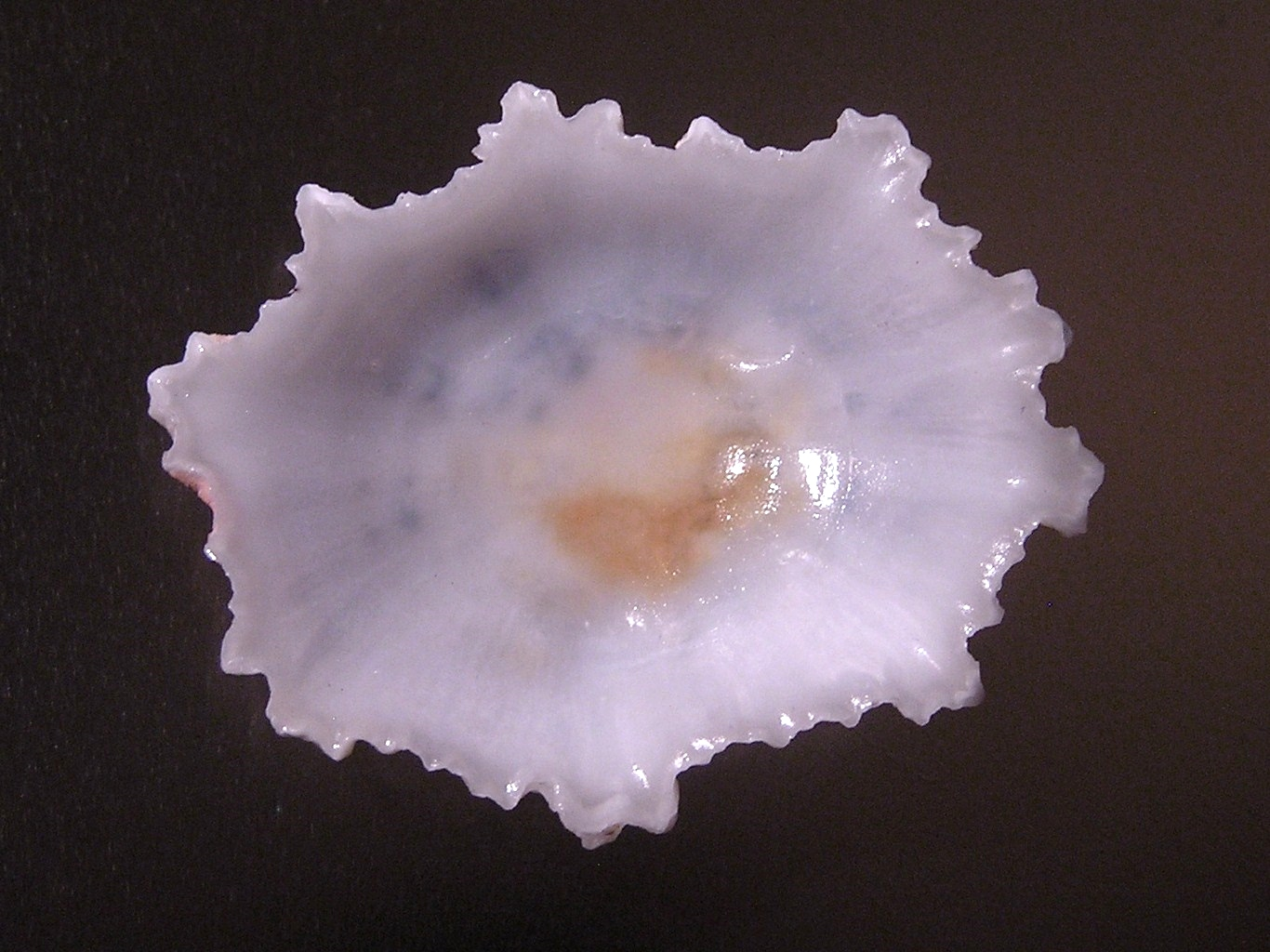
ventral view
