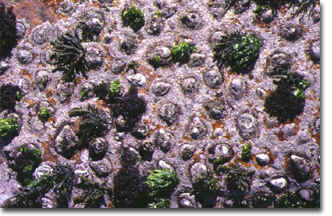
- Spongites yendoi together with the gardening limpet Scutellastra cochlear

Scientific classification
- Domain: Eukaryota
- Clade: Archaeplastida
- Division: Rhodophyta
- Class: Florideophyceae
- Order: Corallinales
- Family: Corallinaceae
- Genus: Spongites
- Species: S. yendoi

Binomial name
- Spongites yendoi (Foslie) Y.M. Chamberlain 1993

Synonyms
- Goniolithon yendoi Foslie, 1900; Lithophyllum natalense Foslie, 1907; Lithophyllum yendoi (Foslie) Foslie, 1900; Lithophyllum yendoi f. mahëicum Foslie, 1906; Lithophyllum yendoi f. malaysicum Foslie, 1906; Lithothamnion yendoi (Foslie) Lemoine, 1965; Pseudolithophyllum natalense (Foslie) Adey, 1970; Pseudolithophyllum yendoi (Foslie) Adey, 1970

= Spongites yendoi =

Species of alga

Spongites yendoi is a species of crustose red seaweed with a hard, calcareous skeleton in the family Corallinaceae. It is found on the lower shore as part of a diverse community in the southeastern Atlantic and the Indo-Pacific Oceans.

== Description ==
Spongites yendoi is a hard, encrusting species of coralline algae. Like other species it contains chlorophyll and uses photosynthesis to synthesize carbohydrates. The cell walls of the algae contain deposits of calcium carbonate which give it its firm consistency. The thallus of Spongites yendoi is relatively thin and is mainly composed of filaments of small, squarish cells. The lowermost layer is up to eight thick filaments; these cells are mostly elongate. The cells are often fused. The tetrasporangial conceptacles are elliptical and have a single pore. Old conceptacles do not become buried as the thallus grows. The colour varies but may be some shade of grey or chalky white. Its range in South Africa extends further north than that of the pear limpet Scutellastra cochlear and when ungrazed by this limpet it is thicker and more knobbly.

== Distribution and habitat ==
Spongites yendoi is found in the southeastern Atlantic and the Indo-Pacific. Its range includes South Africa, Réunion, the Comoroes, Mayotte and Mauritius, and extends to China, Indonesia and Australia. It is also found on the coasts of the North, South and Chatham Islands of New Zealand. It grows on rocks and benthic organisms in the lower parts of the intertidal zone.

== Ecology ==
On the rocky coasts of South Africa, Spongites yendoi is the main algal component of a community of organisms commonly found in the low intertidal zone. A thin layer of this alga tends to cover rock surfaces and seaweeds grow as epiphytes on top. Both the coralline alga and the seaweeds are grazed by the pear limpet and other herbivores. Twice a year, Spongites yendoi sloughs off its upper layers but nevertheless seaweeds soon grow again on the exposed surface which is usually kept clean by the feeding activities of the herbivores. Sloughing is probably a means of eliminating old reproductive structures and damaged surface cells, and reducing the risk of surface penetration by burrowing organisms.

The relationship between the pear limpet and Spongites yendoi could be considered a form of mutualism. The limpet gets 85% of its nutritional needs by grazing on the coralline alga and leaves it in thin sheets with a damaged surface. The limpet is not present in the north of its range and in these areas the algal sheets are much thicker and flabbier, and develop protuberances. It has been observed that the thin form of the alga grows laterally five times as fast as the thick form and is less likely to be attacked by burrowing organisms, so the association between the two organisms may be mutually beneficial.

The pear limpet tends to be covered with a marine lichen Pyrenocollema spp., and Spongites yendoi often grows on top of this. It also grows on the shells of Scutellastra argenvillei, Patella granatina, Oxystele sinensis and Turbo spp., and around the colonial mollusc Dendropoma corallinaceum. A thin layer of this alga may also line tidal pools higher up the shore.
