= Scutellastra natalensis =

Scientific classification
- Kingdom: Animalia
- Phylum: Mollusca
- Class: Gastropoda
- Subclass: Patellogastropoda
- Family: Patellidae
- Genus: Scutellastra
- Species: S. natalensis

Binomial name
- Scutellastra natalensis (Krauss, 1848)

Synonyms
- Patella echinulata F. Krauss, 1848; Patella natalensis Krauss, 1848

Species of gastropod

Scutellastra natalensis is a species of sea snail, a true limpet, a marine gastropod mollusk in the family Patellidae, one of the families of true limpets.

== Distribution ==
This species occurs in KwaZulu-Natal, South Africa.
