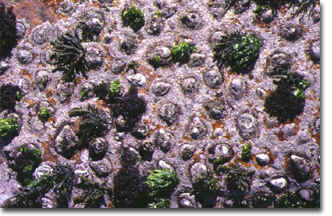
- Pear limpets surrounded by coralline algae Spongites yendoi

Scientific classification
- Kingdom: Animalia
- Phylum: Mollusca
- Class: Gastropoda
- Subclass: Patellogastropoda
- Family: Patellidae
- Genus: Scutellastra
- Species: S. cochlear

Binomial name
- Scutellastra cochlear (Born 1778)

Synonyms
- Patella (Scutellastra) cochlear Born, 1778; Patella cochlear Born, 1778; Patella pyriformis da Costa, 1771

= Scutellastra cochlear =

Species of gastropod

Scutellastra cochlear is a species of sea snail, a marine gastropod mollusc in the family Patellidae, one of the families of true limpets. It is commonly known as the snail patella, the pear limpet or the spoon limpet and is native to South Africa. It often grows in association with the crustose coralline alga Spongites yendoi and a filamentous red alga which it cultivates in a garden. It was first described by the malacologist Ignaz von Born in 1778 as Patella cochlear.

== Description ==
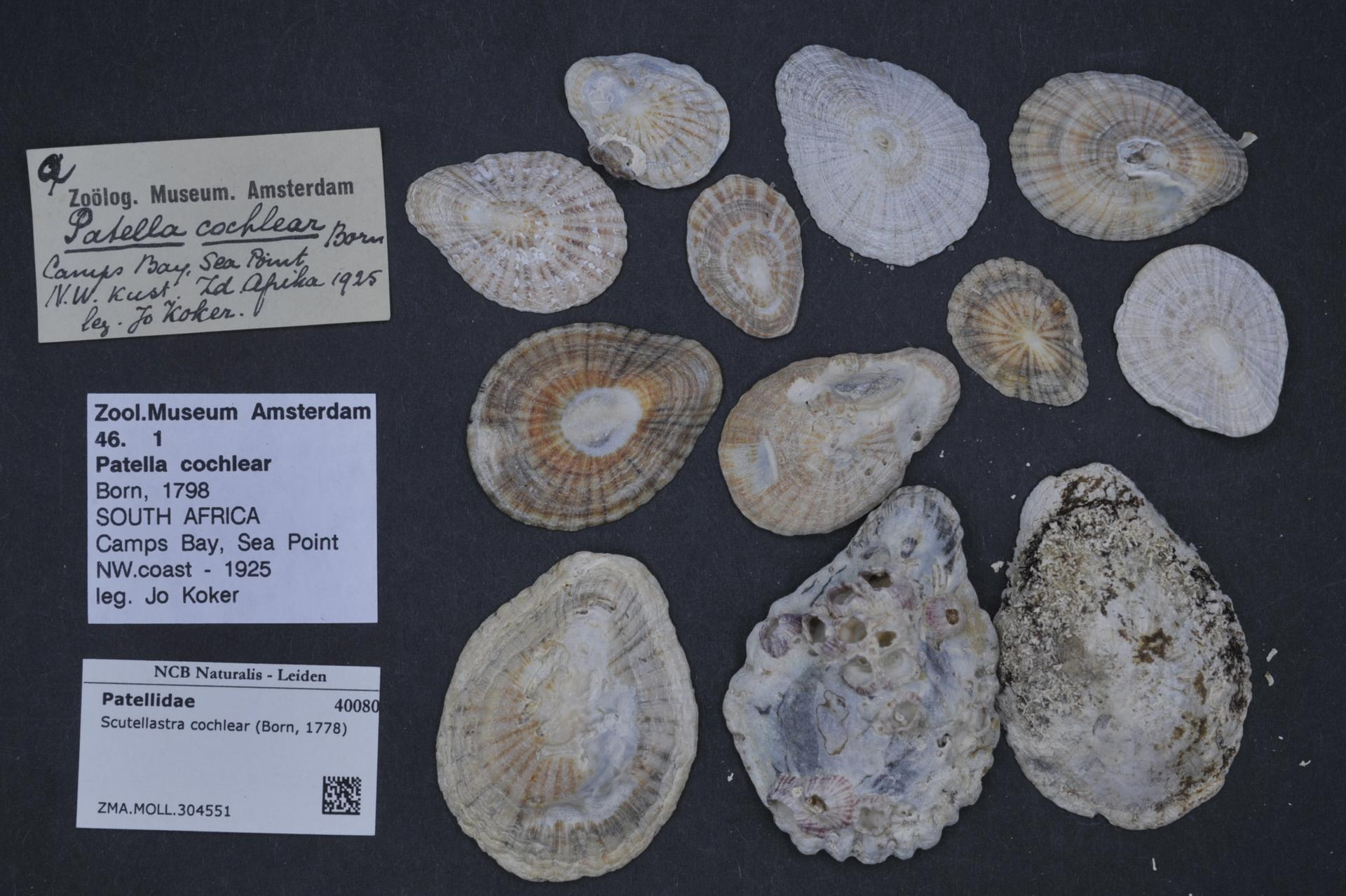
Scutellastra cochlear shells.

Scutellastra cochlear has a distinctive pear-shaped shell. It is a slow-growing species and may live for 25 years, attaining a length of 70 millimetres (2.8 in). The outer surface is often encrusted with coralline algae. The inner surface is white with a bluish tinge, sometimes speckled with black patches, and with a black, U-shaped muscle scar.

== Distribution and habitat ==
Scutellastra cochlear is native to exposed coasts of South Africa where it forms dense colonies on rocks on the lower shore. Its range extends southwards from the mouth of the Orange River in the west of South Africa, round the three Cape Provinces and northwards to Durban on the east coast.

== Biology ==
Scutellastra cochlear is an important part of the lower tidal community in what is sometimes known as the "cochlear zone". Each adult establishes a scar on the underlying rock and occupies this for the rest of its life. This limpet occurs at greater densities than most other species of limpet but that is partly because juveniles often establish themselves on the shell of larger individuals, feeding on the algae and lichen which grow there, until the juveniles are large enough to establish their own scars on the rock. Densities have been found to vary between 90 and about 1,700 limpets per square metre, with greater densities being present in areas with the greatest wave motion. This limpet has a strong influence on the structure of the community as it excludes most species of algae and limits the biodiversity in its vicinity to the coralline alga Spongites yendoi and the strips of filamentous red algae gardens that fringe each limpet. The limpets do not need to move out of their scars to feed as they can reach enough edible material by rotating themselves in their scar. At low tide, when the limpet is exposed to the air, urea accumulates on the underside of the rim of its shell and diffuses out into the surrounding algae. Here it boosts the supply of nitrogen available to the algae and this increases the algal productivity. Scutellastra cochlear is territorial and defends its garden against other limpets.

A marine lichen Pyrenocollema spp. often grows on this limpet's shell, and Spongites yendoi frequently grows on top of this and on the surrounding rocks. The relationship between the limpet and this coralline alga could be considered a form of mutualism. The limpet gets 85% of its nutritional needs by grazing on the coralline alga and leaves it in thin sheets with a damaged surface. The limpet is not present in the north of the alga's range and in these areas the algal sheets are much thicker and flabbier, and develop protuberances. It has been observed that the thin form of the alga grows laterally five times as fast as the thick form and is less likely to be attacked by burrowing organisms, so the association between the two organisms may be mutually beneficial.
