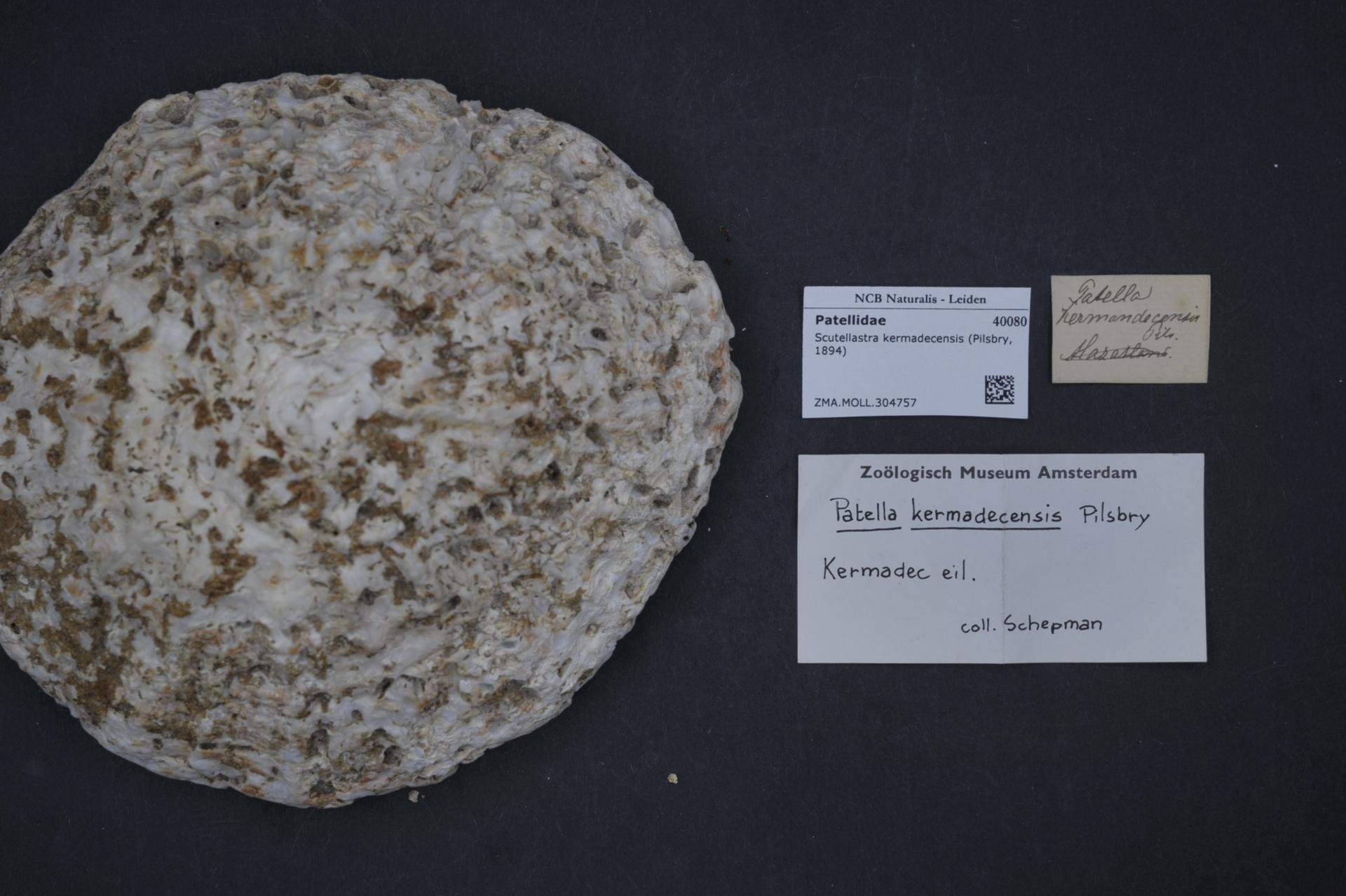

Scientific classification
- Kingdom: Animalia
- Phylum: Mollusca
- Class: Gastropoda
- Subclass: Patellogastropoda
- Family: Patellidae
- Genus: Scutellastra
- Species: S. kermadecensis

Binomial name
- Scutellastra kermadecensis (Pilsbry, 1894)

Synonyms
- Patella (Scutellastra) kermadecensis Pilsbry, 1894 (original combination); Patella (Scutellastra) pilsbryi Brazier, 1894; Patella kermadecensis Pilsbry, 1894

= Scutellastra kermadecensis =

Species of gastropod

Scutellastra kermadecensis is a species of true limpet, a marine gastropod mollusk in the family Patellidae. It is endemic to the Kermadec Islands (New Zealand).

== Description ==
Original species description:

The large and massive shell is conical with the apex subcentral. The slopes of the cone are nearly straight. The outline is short ovate, slightly narrower in front. The exterior is whitish, apparently strongly ribbed when perfect, but the specimens described are everywhere deeply eroded. The border is lightly scalloped by the ribbing, and finely puckered at the edge. Muscle-scar roughened, strongly marked, and either white or bright orange. The rest of the interior is white, stained in places with livid-brown or purplish. Length 135, breadth 115, alt. 48 mm.

Scutellastra kermadecensis commonly reaches shell lengths exceeding 135 mm (5.3 in).

== Reproduction ==
Scutellastra kermadecensis is a broadcast spawner with pelagic larvae. It is a protandrous sequential hermaphrodite.

== Distribution and habitat ==
This marine species is endemic to the waters off the Kermadec Islands. It is the dominant grazing invertebrate between the low intertidal and shallow subtidal zones. It can reach densities in excess of 40 individuals per square meter.

Despite the relatively small distribution area, there is evidence for small but significant genetic differentiation between populations sampled in the middle and northern parts of the island chain.
