= Cymbula depsta =

Scientific classification
- Kingdom: Animalia
- Phylum: Mollusca
- Class: Gastropoda
- Subclass: Patellogastropoda
- Family: Patellidae
- Genus: Cymbula
- Species: C. depsta

Binomial name
- Cymbula depsta (Reeve, 1855)

Species of gastropod

Cymbula depsta is a species of sea snail, a true limpet, a marine gastropod mollusc in the family Patellidae, one of the families of true limpets.
