= Scutellastra miliaris =

Scientific classification
- Kingdom: Animalia
- Phylum: Mollusca
- Class: Gastropoda
- Subclass: Patellogastropoda
- Family: Patellidae
- Genus: Scutellastra
- Species: S. miliaris

Binomial name
- Scutellastra miliaris (Philippi, 1848)

Species of gastropod

Scutellastra miliaris is a species of sea snail, a true limpet, a marine gastropod mollusk in the family Patellidae, one of the families of true limpets.
