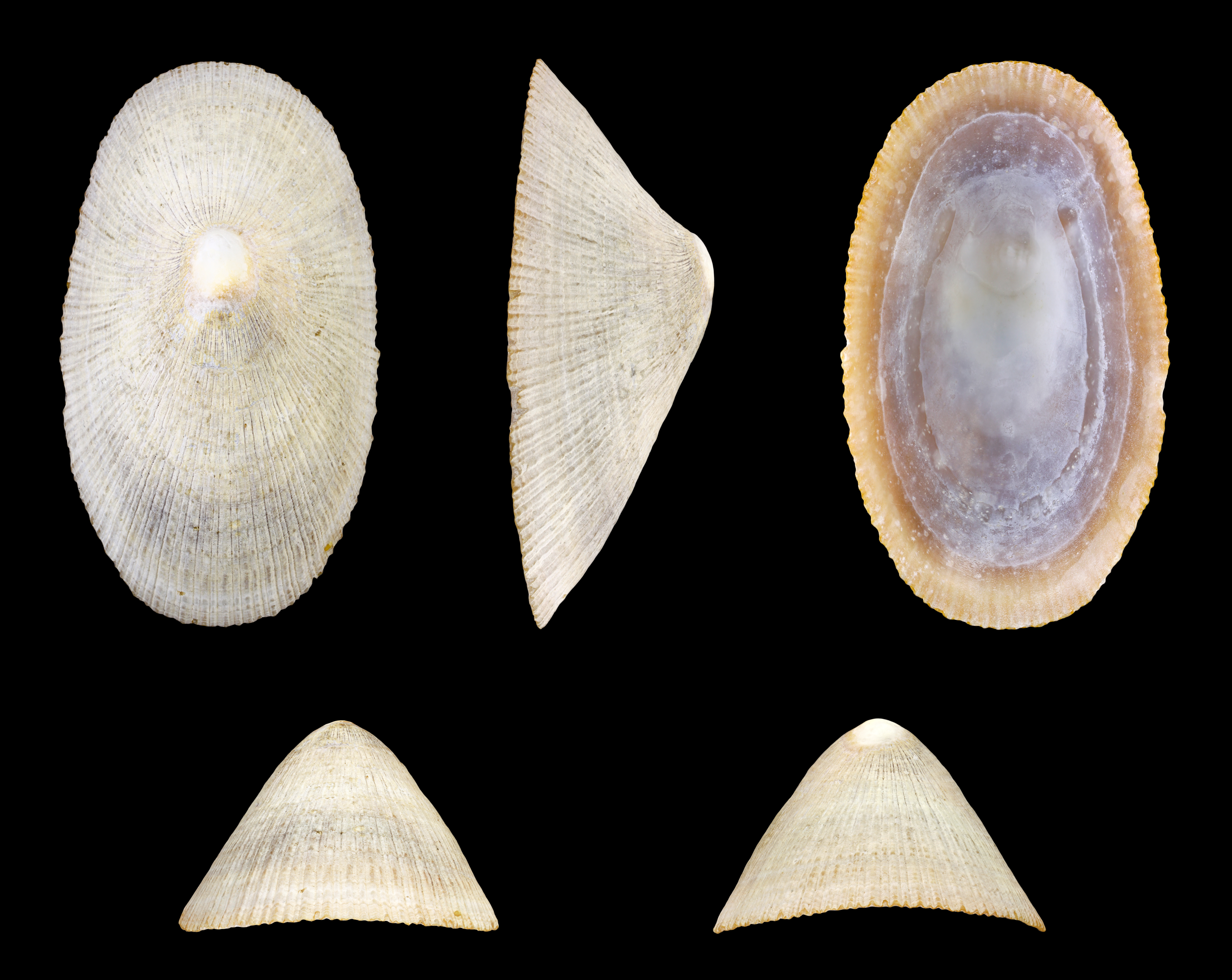

Scientific classification
- Kingdom: Animalia
- Phylum: Mollusca
- Class: Gastropoda
- Subclass: Patellogastropoda
- Family: Patellidae
- Genus: Cymbula
- Species: C. compressa

Binomial name
- Cymbula compressa (Linnaeus, 1758)

Synonyms
- Patella compressa Linnaeus, 1758

= Cymbula compressa =

Species of gastropod

Cymbula compressa is a species of sea snail, a true limpet, a marine gastropod mollusc in the family Patellidae, one of the families of true limpets.
