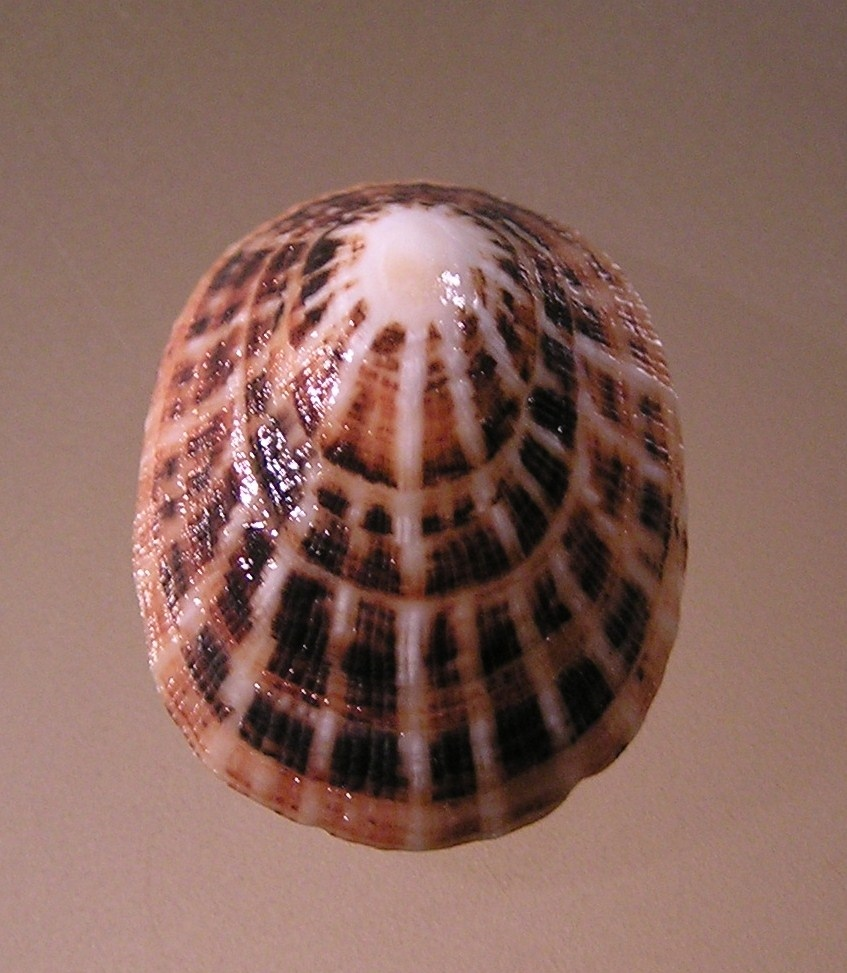
- apical view of the shell of Scutellastra peronii
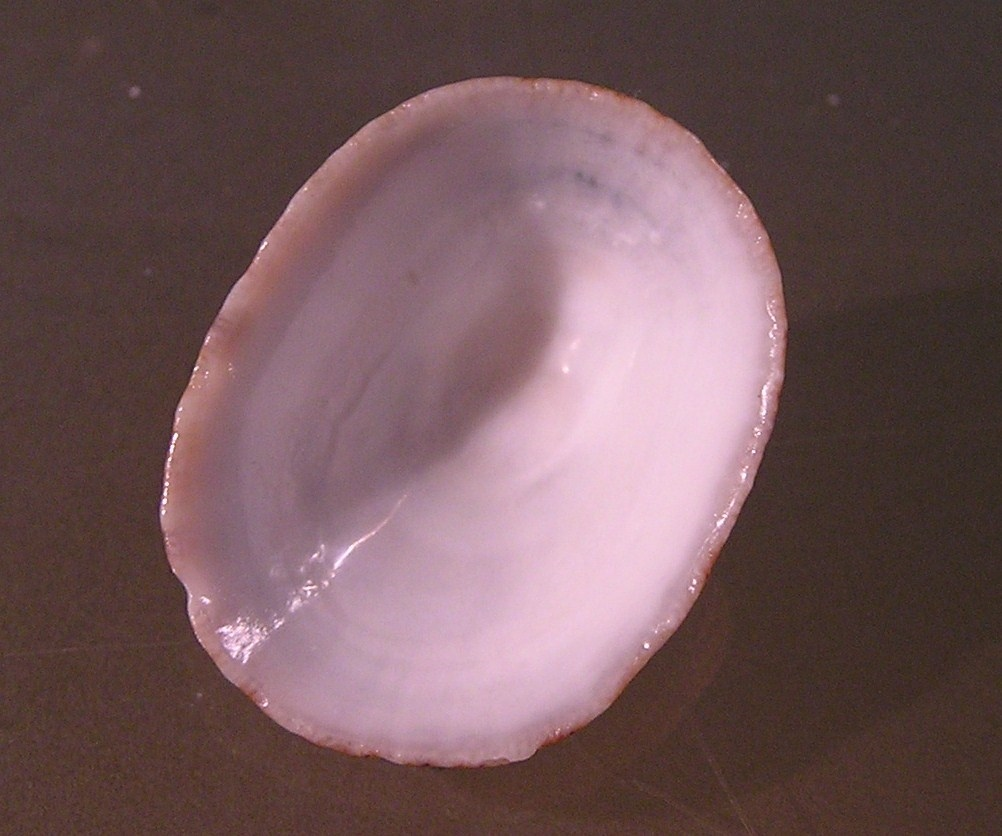
- basal view of the shell of Scutellastra peronii

Scientific classification
- Kingdom: Animalia
- Phylum: Mollusca
- Class: Gastropoda
- Subclass: Patellogastropoda
- Family: Patellidae
- Genus: Scutellastra
- Species: S. peronii

Binomial name
- Scutellastra peronii (Blainville, 1825)

Synonyms
- Patella peronii Blainville, 1825; Patella squamifera Reeve, 1855; Patella tasmanica Tenison Woods, 1876

= Scutellastra peronii =

Species of gastropod

Scutellastra peronii, also known as Peron's limpet and scaly limpet, is a species of true limpet, a marine gastropod mollusk in the family Patellidae.

== Distribution ==
Scutellastra peronii is known from Australian coastal waters. It is found from south-east Queensland, New South Wales, Victoria, Tasmania, South Australia through to Shark Bay, in Western Australia.
