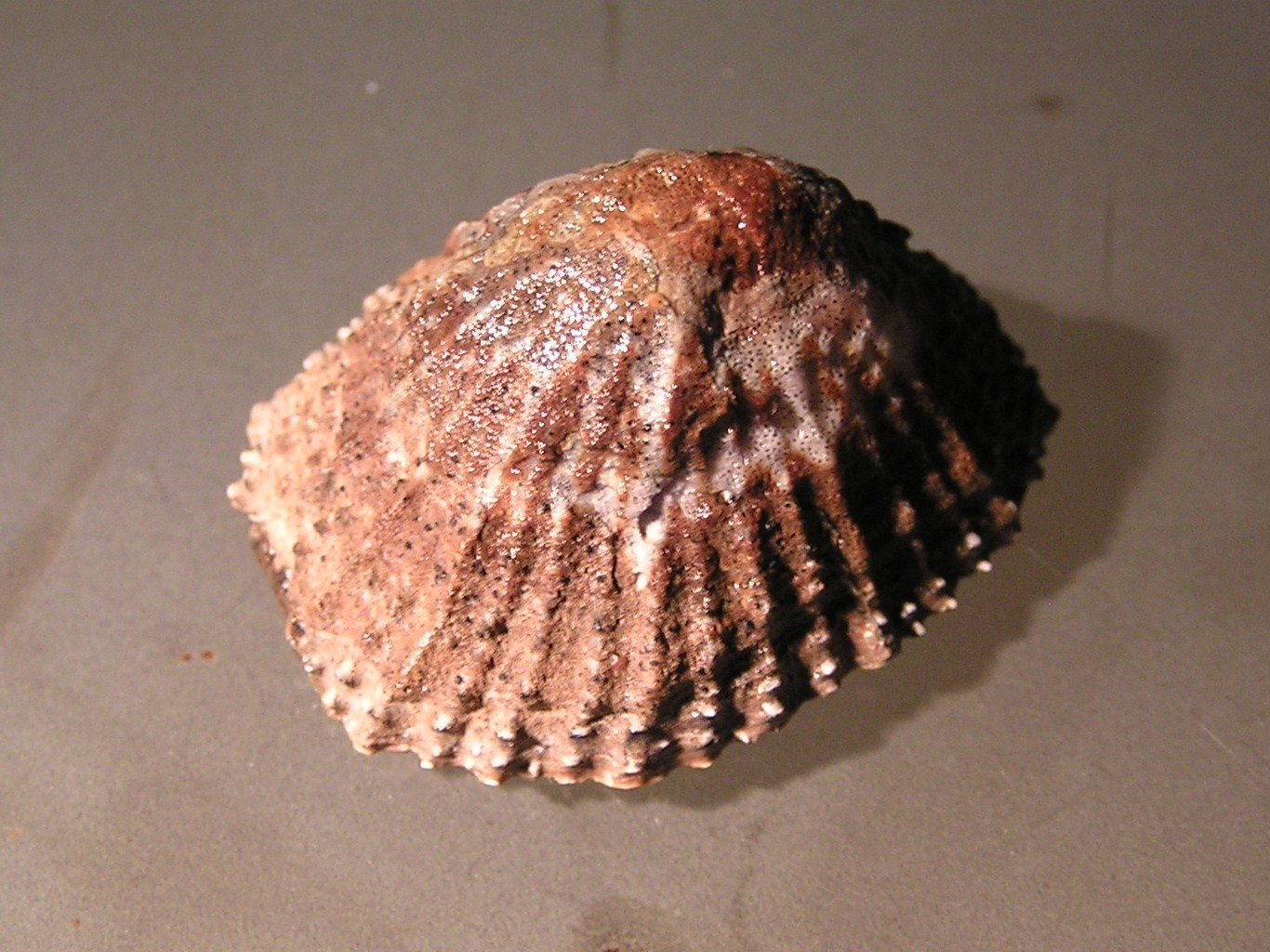

Scientific classification
- Kingdom: Animalia
- Phylum: Mollusca
- Class: Gastropoda
- Subclass: Patellogastropoda
- Family: Patellidae
- Genus: Scutellastra
- Species: S. granularis

Binomial name
- Scutellastra granularis (Linnaeus, 1758)

Synonyms
- Patella (Scutellastra) granularis Linnaeus, 1758

= Scutellastra granularis =

Species of gastropod

Scutellastra granularis is a species of sea snail, a true limpet, a marine gastropod mollusk in the family Patellidae, one of the families of true limpets.

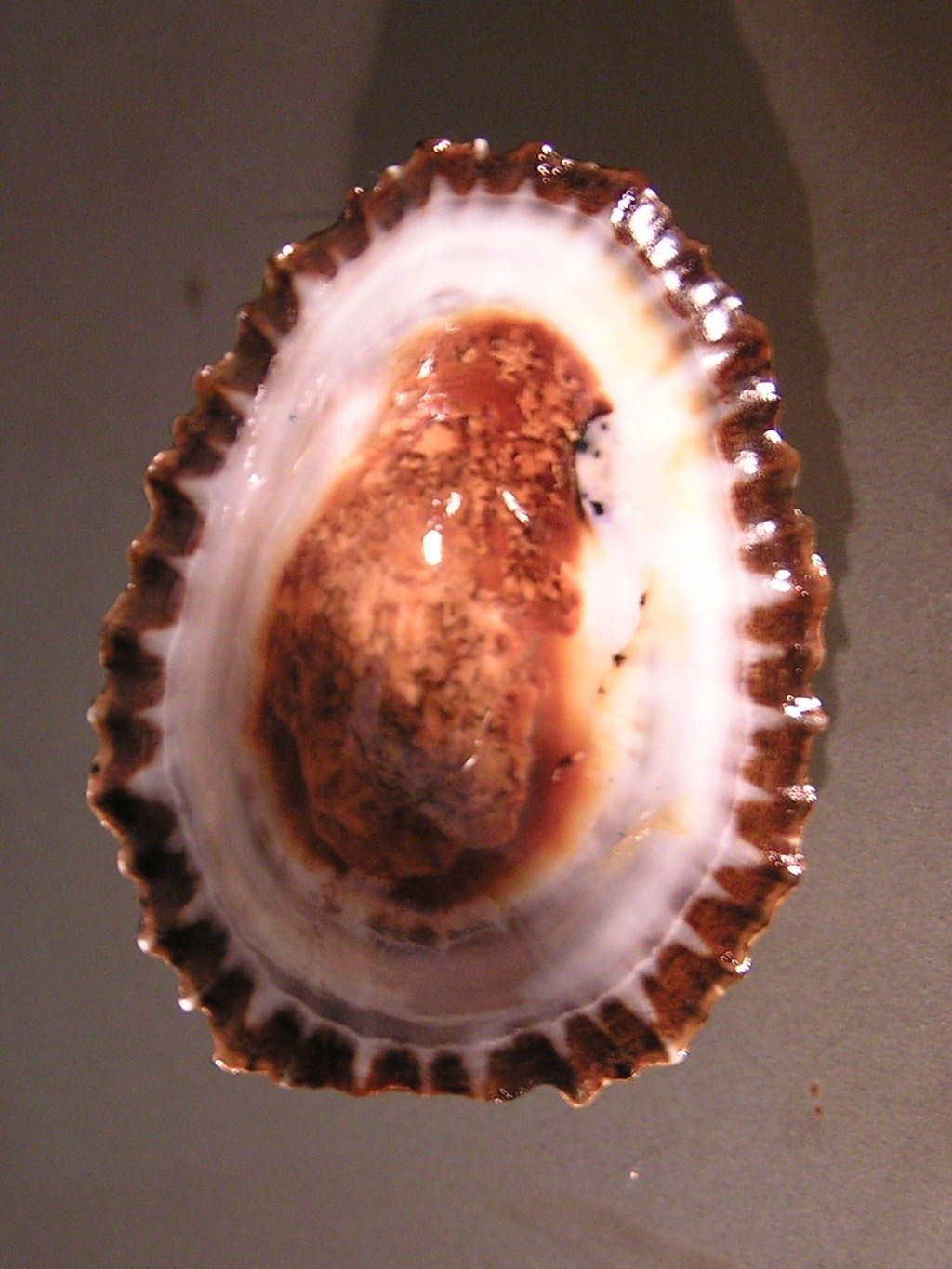
Scutellastra granularis, ventral view
