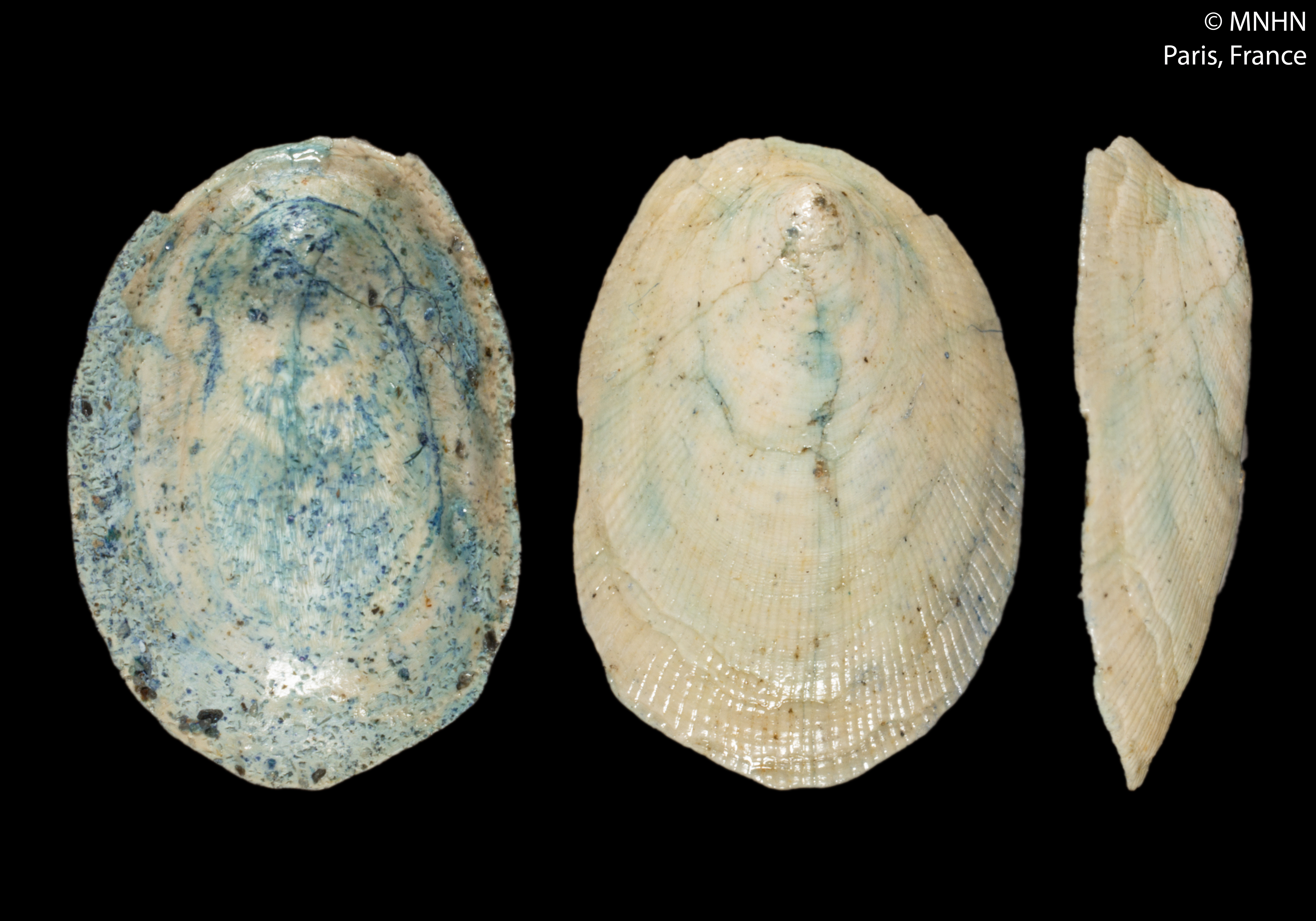
- Shell of Proscutum deretrarum (holotype at MNHN, Paris)

Scientific classification
- Kingdom: Animalia
- Phylum: Mollusca
- Class: Gastropoda
- Subclass: Patellogastropoda
- Superfamily: Patelloidea
- Family: Patellidae
- Genus: †Proscutum; P. Fischer, 1885

Synonyms
- † Scutum (Proscutum) P. Fischer, 1885 (original rank)

= Proscutum =

Genus of gastropods

Proscutum is a genus of sea snails, the true limpets, marine gastropod mollusks in the family Patellidae.

== Species ==
- † Proscutum compressum (Deshayes, 1861)
- † Proscutum deretranum Lozouet, 1999
