= Cymbula canescens =

Scientific classification
- Kingdom: Animalia
- Phylum: Mollusca
- Class: Gastropoda
- Subclass: Patellogastropoda
- Family: Patellidae
- Genus: Cymbula
- Species: C. canescens

Binomial name
- Cymbula canescens (Gmelin, 1791)

Species of gastropod

Cymbula canescens is a species of sea snail, a true limpet, a marine gastropod mollusc in the family Patellidae, one of the families of true limpets.
