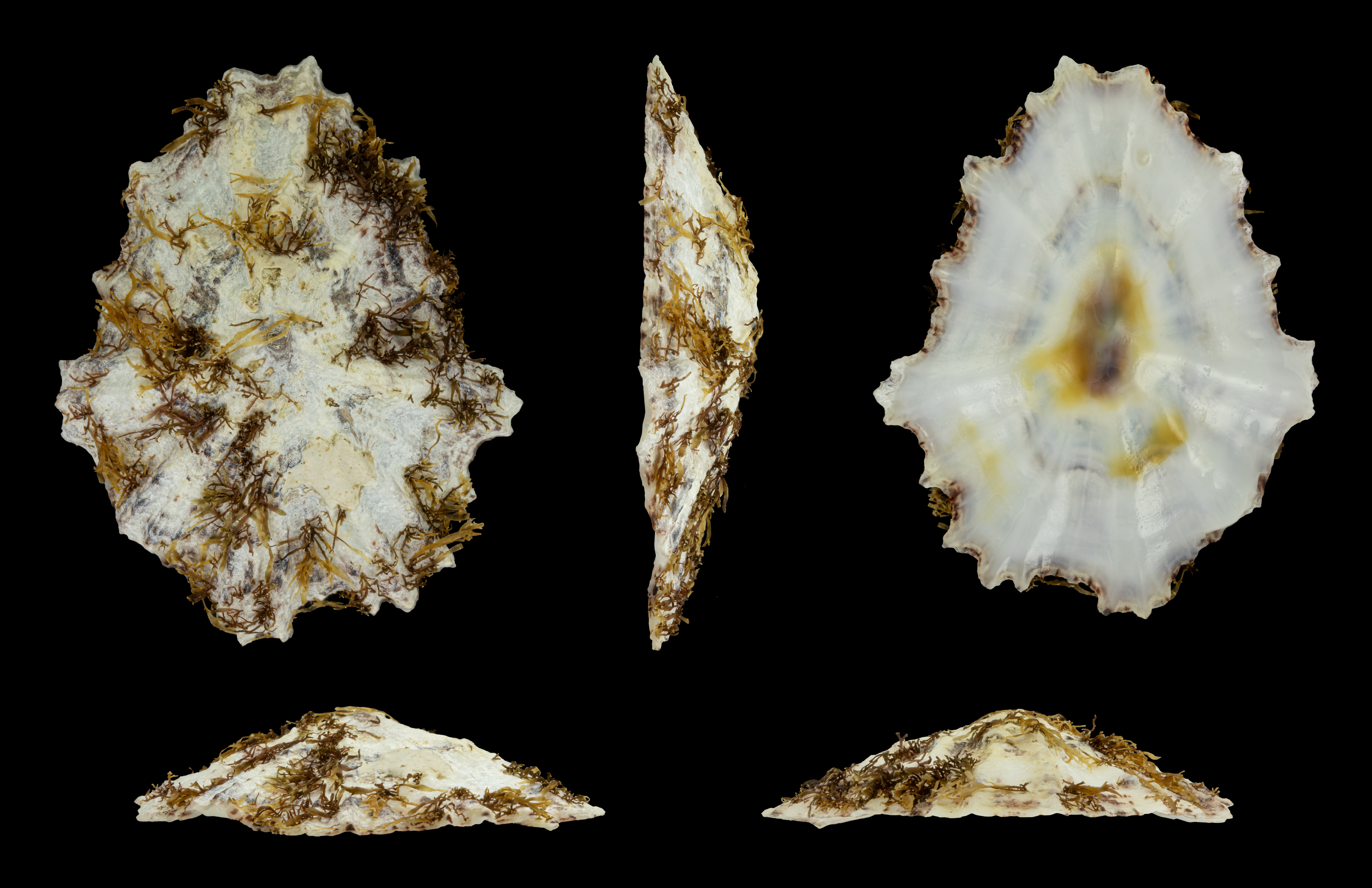

Scientific classification
- Kingdom: Animalia
- Phylum: Mollusca
- Class: Gastropoda
- Subclass: Patellogastropoda
- Family: Patellidae
- Genus: Scutellastra
- Species: S. exusta

Binomial name
- Scutellastra exusta (Reeve, 1854)

Synonyms
- Patella (Scutellastra) pica Reeve, 1854; Patella exusta Reeve, 1854; Patella pica Reeve, 1854

= Scutellastra exusta =

Species of gastropod

Scutellastra exusta is a species of sea snail, a true limpet, a marine gastropod mollusk in the family Patellidae, one of the families of true limpets. Dead Scutellastra exusta help to form shallow marine sediment beds.

== Description ==
Individual Scutellastra exusta can grow up to 34.4 millimeters across and weigh up to 7.22 grams. They reproduce sexually, they feed on algae. They move via a form of mucus meditated gliding. They have a stemmata through which they can sense some visual information.

== Distribution ==
This species can be found in the benthic zone along the coasts of the Indian Ocean, namely in eastern South Africa and in the Gulf of Oman.
