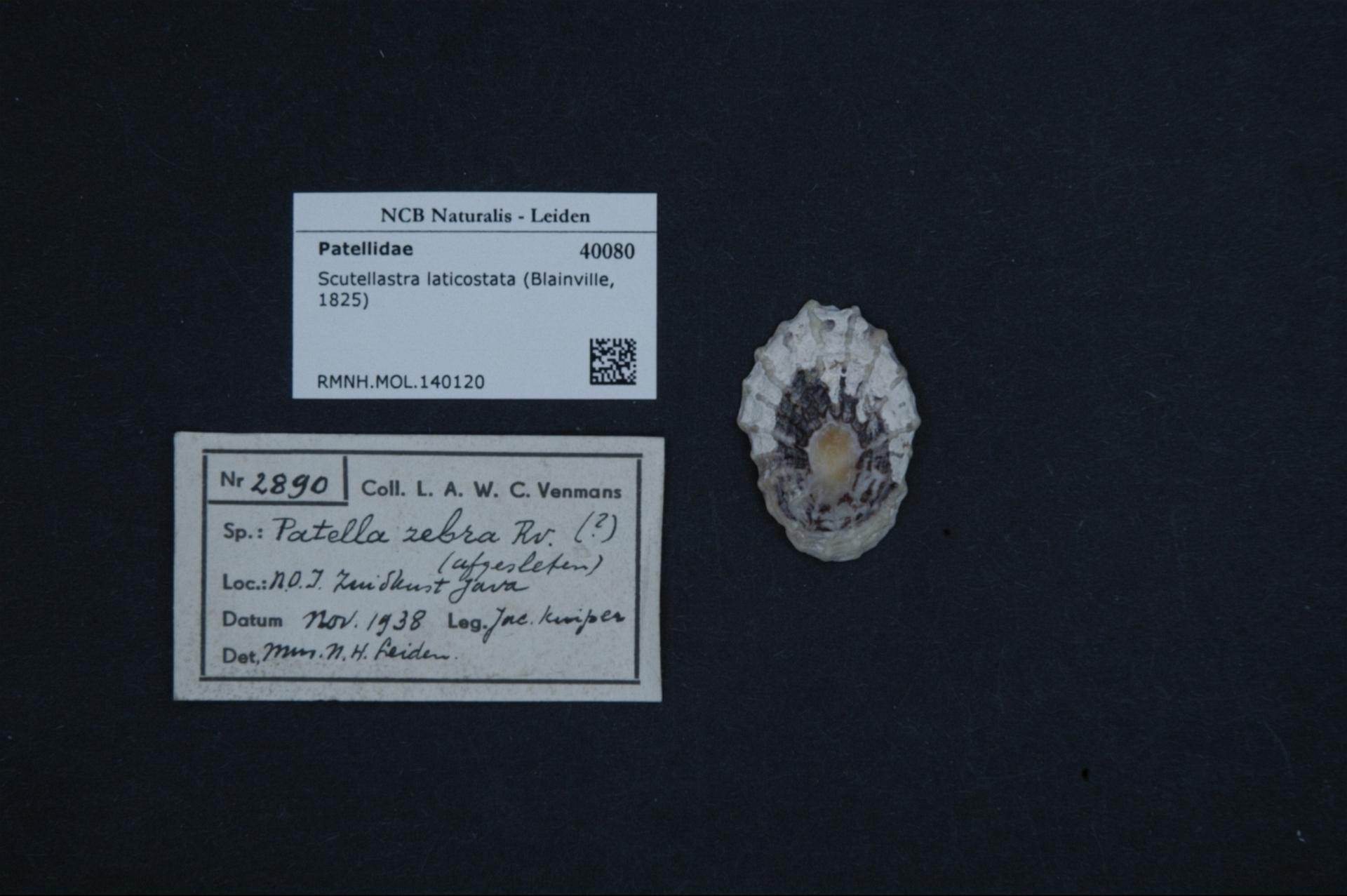

Scientific classification
- Kingdom: Animalia
- Phylum: Mollusca
- Class: Gastropoda
- Subclass: Patellogastropoda
- Family: Patellidae
- Genus: Scutellastra
- Species: S. laticostata

Binomial name
- Scutellastra laticostata (Blainville, 1825)

Synonyms
- Cellana laticostata (Blainville, 1825); Patella laticostata Blainville, 1825 (original combination)

= Scutellastra laticostata =

Species of gastropod

Scutellastra laticostata is a species of sea snail, a true limpet, a marine gastropod mollusk in the family Patellidae, one of the families of true limpets.
