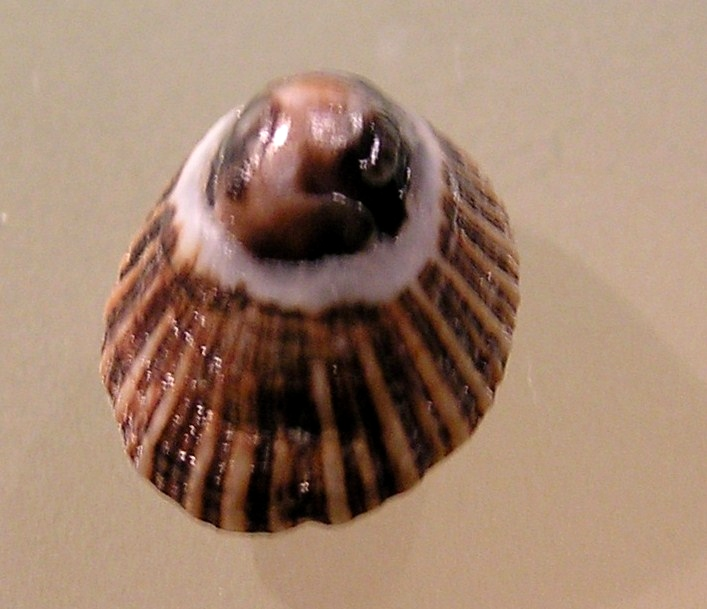
- Scutellastra aphanes

Scientific classification
- Kingdom: Animalia
- Phylum: Mollusca
- Class: Gastropoda
- Subclass: Patellogastropoda
- Family: Patellidae
- Genus: Scutellastra
- Species: S. aphanes

Binomial name
- Scutellastra aphanes (Robson, 1986)

Synonyms
- Patella (Scutellastra) aphanes Robson, 1986; Patella aphanes Robson, 1986

= Scutellastra aphanes =

Species of gastropod

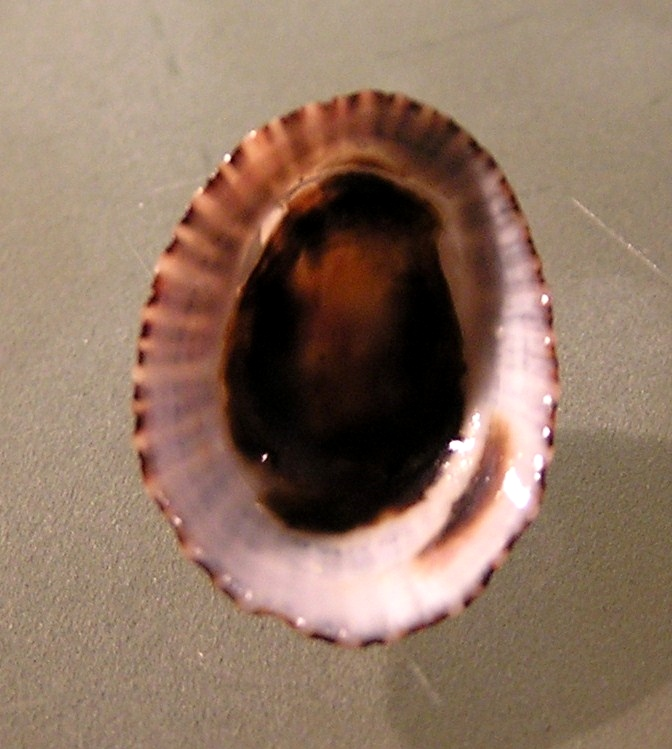
Scutellastra aphanes, ventral view

Scutellastra aphanes is a species of sea snail, a true limpet, a marine gastropod mollusk in the family Patellidae, one of the families of true limpets. It is endemic to South Africa.

== Taxonomy ==
Scutellastra aphanes was originally described by Gary Robson in 1986, as Patella aphanes. The specific name "aphanes" means "unseen" or "unnoticed" in Greek. The species and other Southern African Patella were later moved to Scutellastra in 1998 based on morphological analysis.

== Description ==
Scutellastra aphanes consists of two distinct ecomorphs, one associated with beds of the mussel Perna perna and the other on nearby rocks. The most striking difference between the two is that the rock-dwelling form possesses more prominent shell ribs and the ventral margin is not concave in profile, unlike the mussel-dwelling form.
