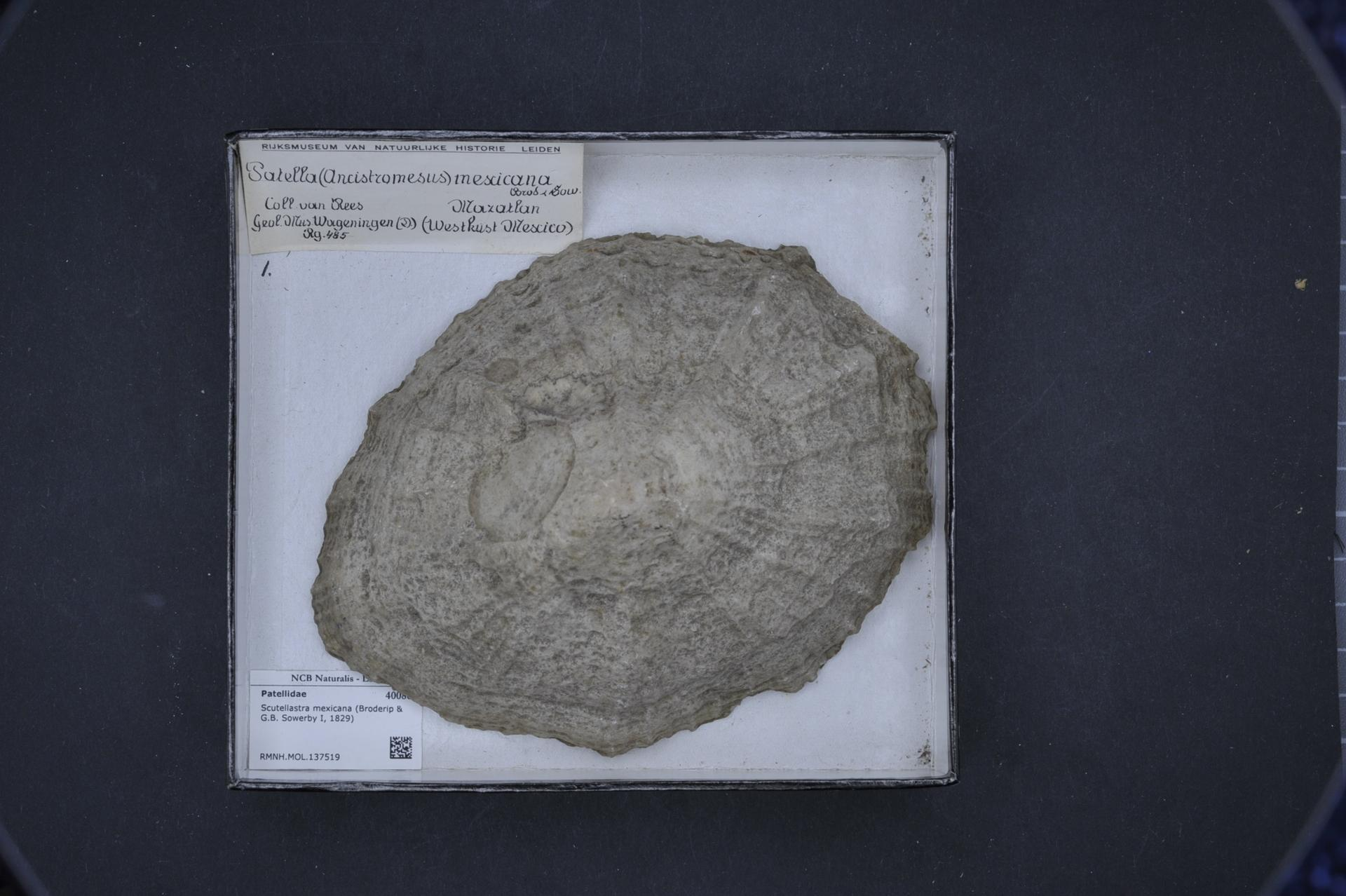

Scientific classification
- Kingdom: Animalia
- Phylum: Mollusca
- Class: Gastropoda
- Subclass: Patellogastropoda
- Family: Patellidae
- Genus: Scutellastra
- Species: S. mexicana

Binomial name
- Scutellastra mexicana (Broderip & Sowerby I, 1829)

Synonyms
- Patella mexicana Broderip & Sowerby, 1829

= Scutellastra mexicana =

Species of gastropod

Scutellastra mexicana is a species of true limpet, a marine gastropod mollusk in the family Patellidae. It is the largest known limpet in the world.

This species has been harvested since pre-Hispanic times. In Mexico, it was harvested heavily in the 1970s and 1980s, leading to closing of the fishery in 1988. However, the harvest has continued, and it is feared that Scutellastra mexicana is in danger of extinction.

== Description ==
Scutellastra mexicana can reach 35.5 cm (14.0 in) in length.

== Distribution and habitat ==
Scutellastra mexicana occurs along the American Pacific coast from Mexico to Peru. It inhabits lower intertidal and subtidal rocky areas exposed to heavy swells.
