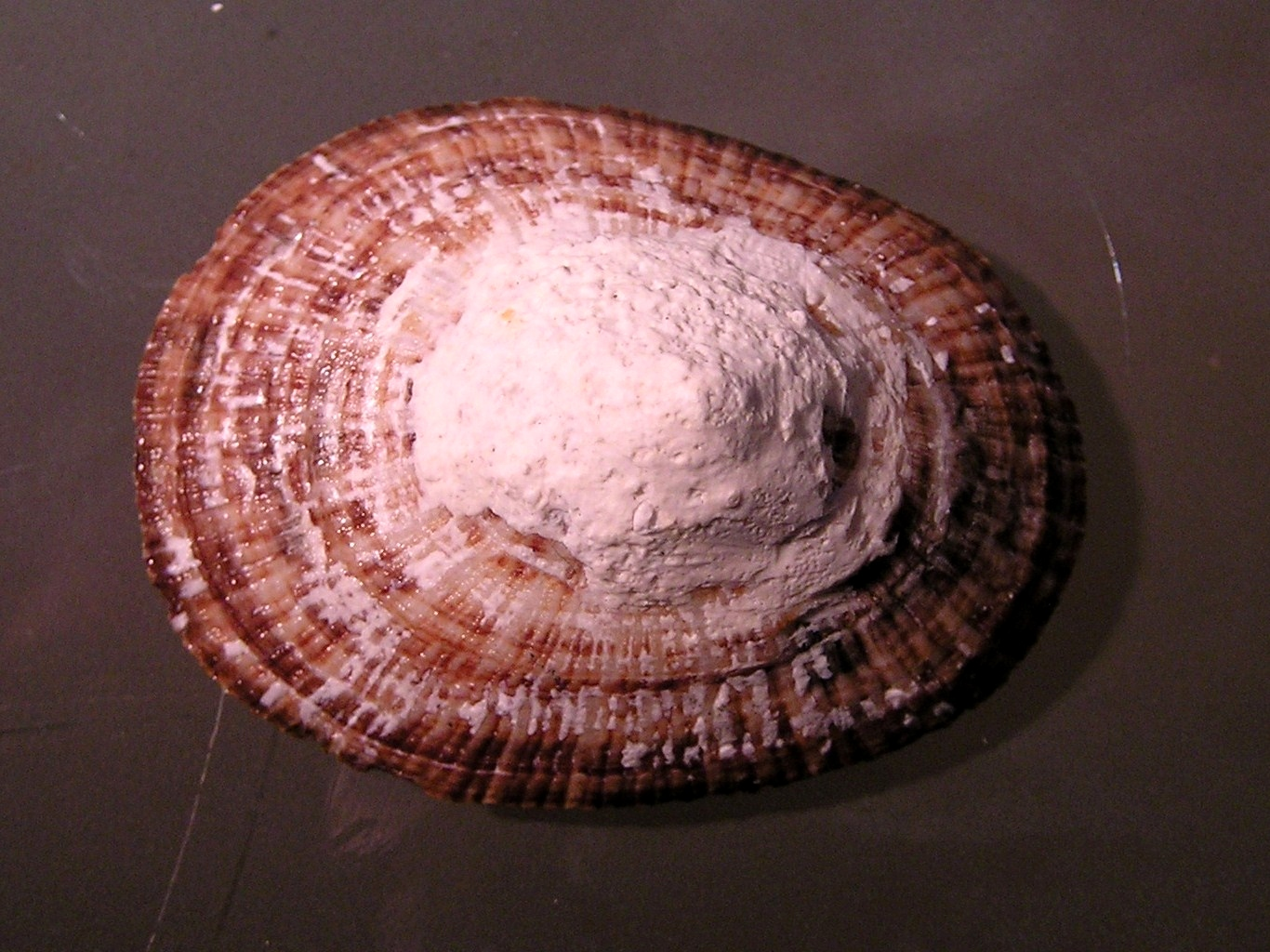

Scientific classification
- Kingdom: Animalia
- Phylum: Mollusca
- Class: Gastropoda
- Subclass: Patellogastropoda
- Family: Patellidae
- Genus: Scutellastra
- Species: S. argenvillei

Binomial name
- Scutellastra argenvillei (Krauss, 1848)

Synonyms
- Patella (Scutellastra) argenvillei Krauss, 1848; Patella argenvillei Krauss, 1848

= Scutellastra argenvillei =

Large species of limpet endemic to the south and west coasts of southern Africa

Scutellastra argenvillei or Argenville's limpet, is a species of sea snail, a true limpet, a marine gastropod mollusk in the family Patellidae, one of the families of true limpets.

It is endemic to the south and west coasts of Namibia and South Africa in southern Africa.

== Description ==
It is a large and relatively tall limpet, with an oval base, slightly narrower at one end, with a maximum size of about 90 mm. The outer surface has fine radiating ridges, and the apex is commonly eroded. Inner surface is generally white.

== Ecology ==
This limpet is abundant on moderately exposed shores in the low inter-tidal and shallow subtidal zone on the west coast of South Africa, but is being displaced by the invasive Mediterranean mussel Mytilus galloprovincialis. The lower inter-tidal zone in this area is also referred to as the Cochlear-Argenvillei zone. It feeds on kelp by trapping the edge of fronds under the edge of its shell while feeding.

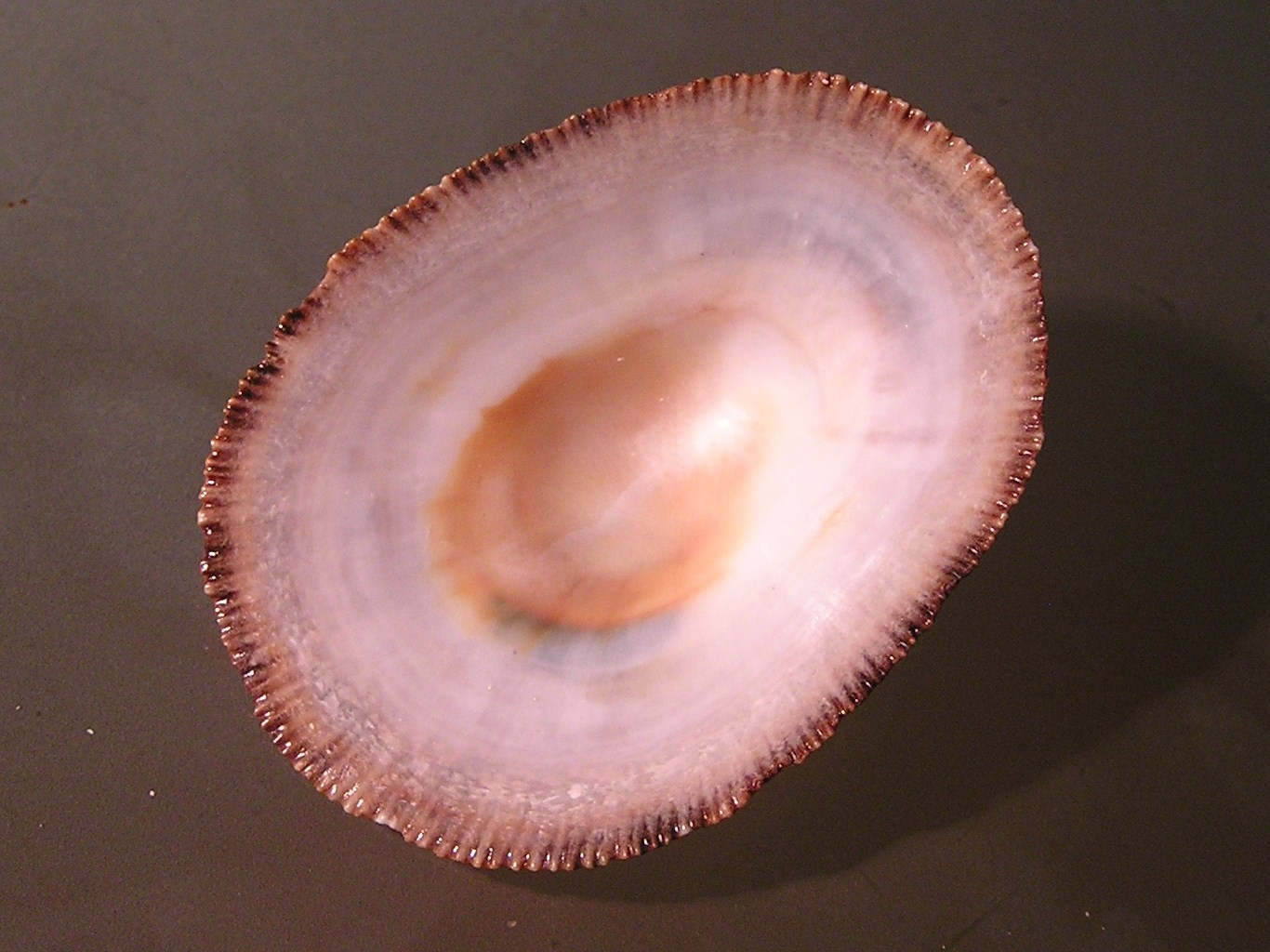
Scutellastra argenvillei, ventral view
