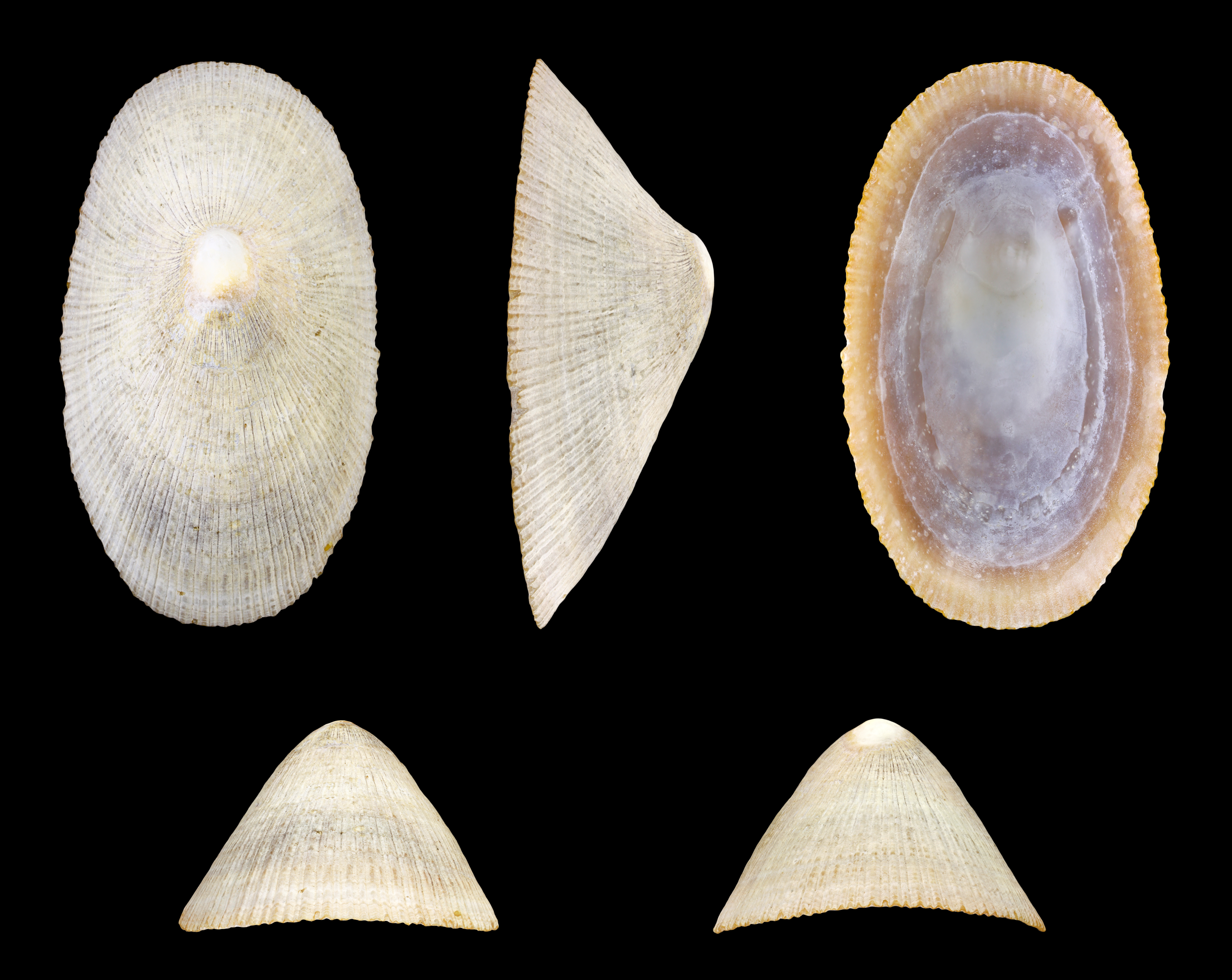
- Cymbula compressa shell

Scientific classification
- Kingdom: Animalia
- Phylum: Mollusca
- Class: Gastropoda
- Subclass: Patellogastropoda
- Family: Patellidae
- Genus: Cymbula; H. Adams & A. Adams, 1854

Type species
- Patella compressa Linnaeus, 1758

Synonyms
- Laevipatella Pallary, 1920; Patella (Cymbula) H. Adams & A. Adams, 1854; Patella (Laevipatella) Pallary, 1920; Patellona Thiele, 1891

= Cymbula =

Genus of gastropods

Cymbula is a genus of sea snails, the true limpets, marine gastropod mollusks in the family Patellidae.

== Species ==
Species within the genus Cymbula include:

- Cymbula adansonii (Dunker, 1853)
- Cymbula canescens (Gmelin, 1791)
- Cymbula compressa (Linnaeus, 1758)
- Cymbula depsta (Reeve, 1855)
- Cymbula granatina (Linnaeus, 1758)
- Cymbula miniata (Born, 1778)
- Cymbula oculus (Born, 1778)
- Cymbula safiana (Lamarck, 1819)
- Cymbula sanguinans (Reeve, 1854)

Species brought into synonymy

- Cymbula nigra (da Costa, 1771): synonym of Cymbula safiana (Lamarck, 1819)
