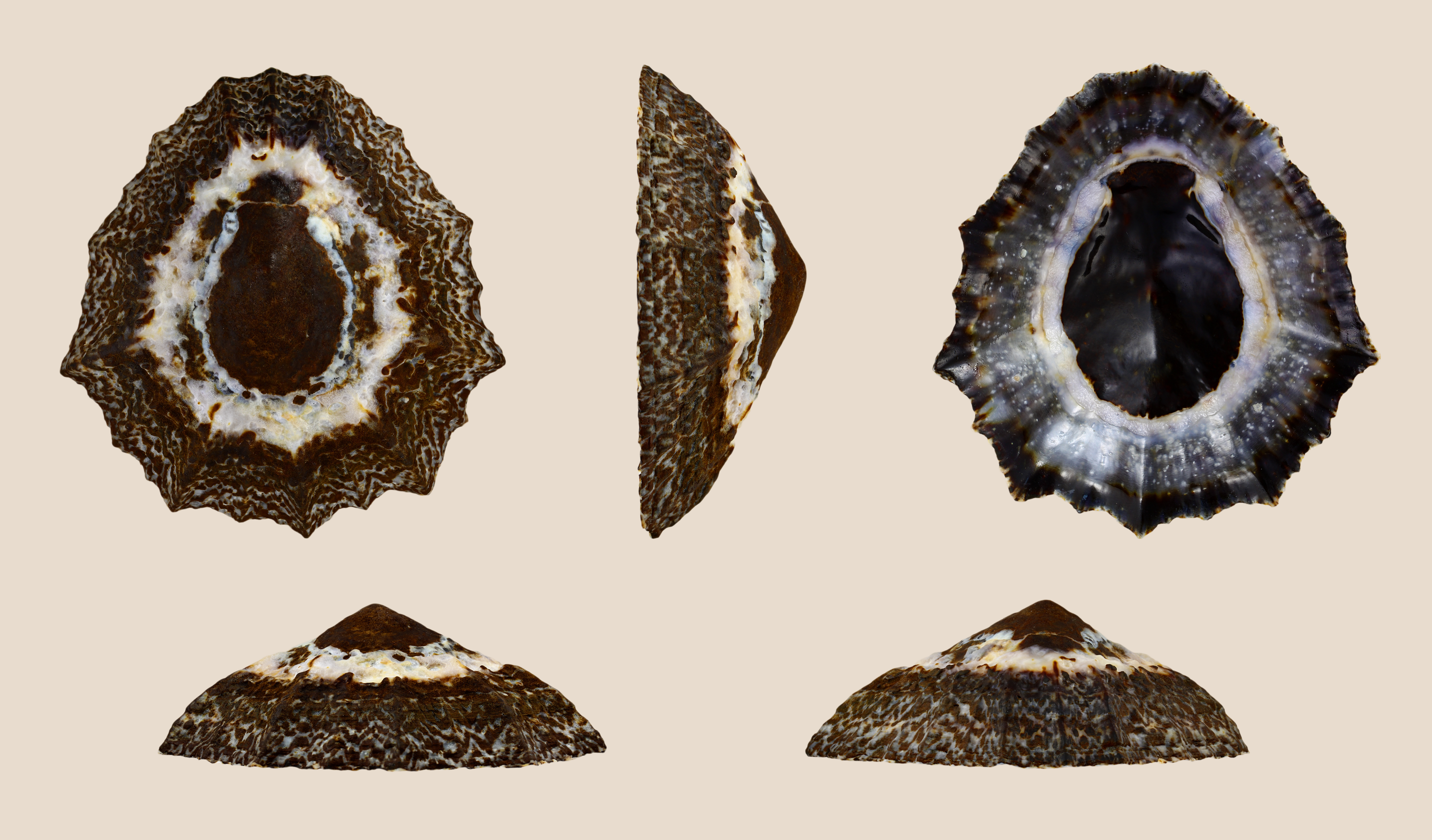

Scientific classification
- Kingdom: Animalia
- Phylum: Mollusca
- Class: Gastropoda
- Subclass: Patellogastropoda
- Family: Patellidae
- Genus: Cymbula
- Species: C. granatina

Binomial name
- Cymbula granatina (Linnaeus, 1758)

Synonyms
- Patella granatina Linnaeus, 1758; Patella septemradiata Fischer von Waldheim, 1807

= Cymbula granatina =

Species of gastropod

Cymbula granatina, the granite limpet, is a species of sea snail, a true limpet, a marine gastropod mollusc in the family Patellidae, one of the families of true limpets. Unlike some other species of giant limpet, C. granatina is non-territorial, and feeds on a variety of different algae.

== Description ==
The size of the shell varies between 50 mm and 90 mm.

== Distribution ==
This species occurs in the Atlantic Ocean off South Africa and Angola, being common on the upper shore in the cool temperate biogeographical region of Benguela, from Lüderitz to the Cape of Good Hope.

== Ecology ==
Cymbula granatina is one of the commonest limpets on the foreshore. It is a herbivore and feeds on a variety of different algae and does not hold and defend a territory. It has a fairly high growth rate and a high gonadal output. The larvae are planktonic and settle on the lower part of the shore. They move progressively higher up the shore after the age of about two years. Although adhering tightly to the rock when out of water, when the tide comes in and covers them, they move about, grazing on algae with their toothed radula. Limpets show great homing ability and tend to return to the same location when the tide goes out, often making a scar on the rock.
