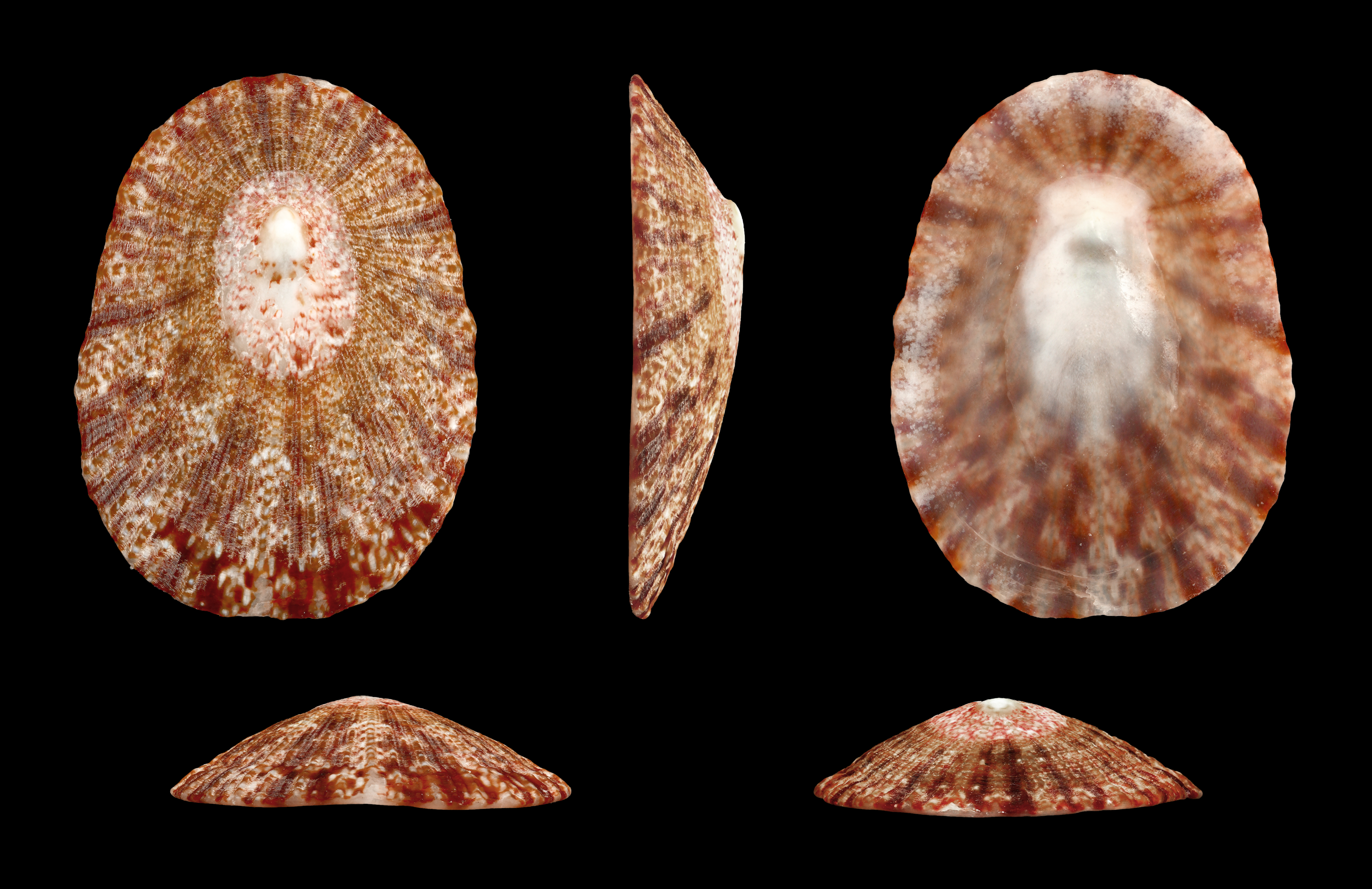

Scientific classification
- Kingdom: Animalia
- Phylum: Mollusca
- Class: Gastropoda
- Subclass: Patellogastropoda
- Family: Patellidae
- Genus: Cymbula
- Species: C. miniata

Binomial name
- Cymbula miniata (Born, 1778)

Synonyms
- Patella becki W. H. Turton, 1933; Patella denseplicata W. H. Turton, 1932; Patella miniata Born, 1778; Patella pulchella W. H. Turton, 1932

= Cymbula miniata =

Species of gastropod

Cymbula miniata is a species of sea snail, a true limpet, a marine gastropod mollusc in the family Patellidae, one of the families of true limpets.
