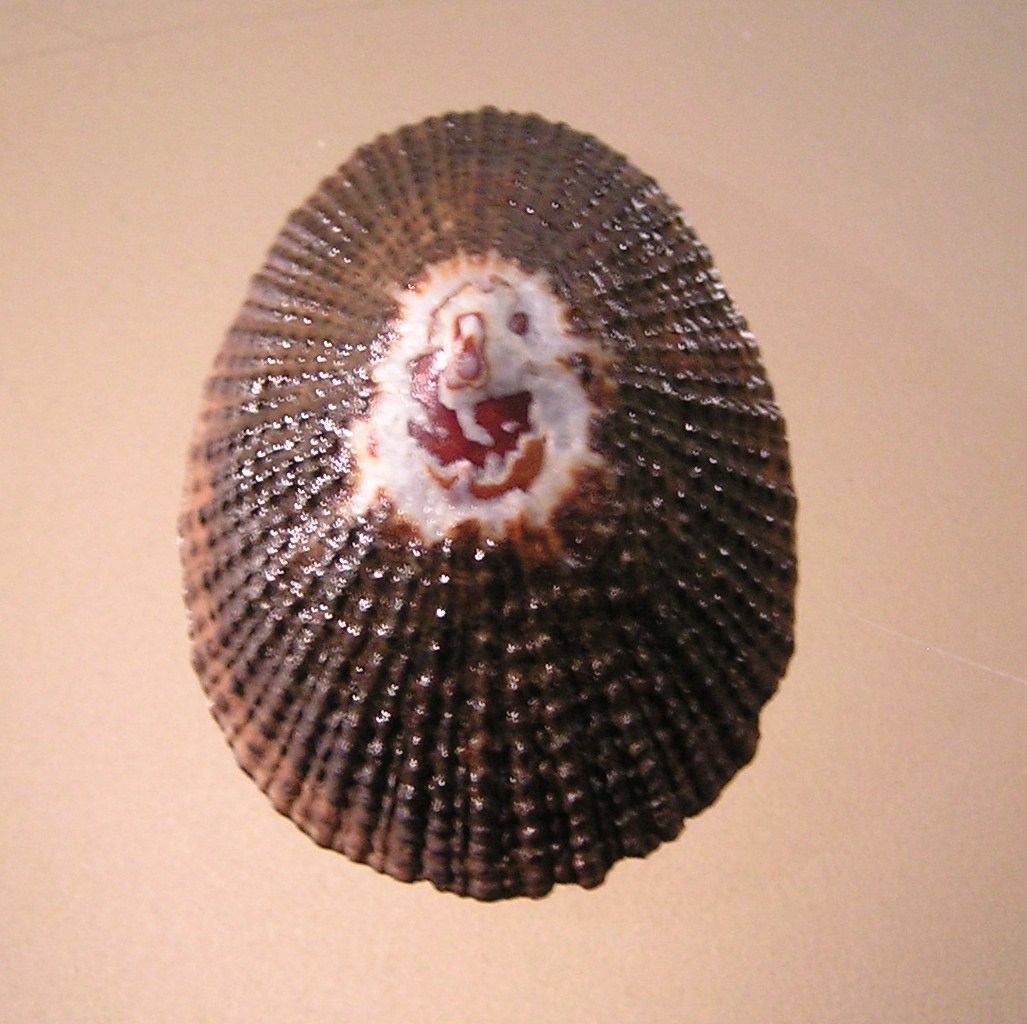
- shell of Scutellastra granularis

Scientific classification
- Kingdom: Animalia
- Phylum: Mollusca
- Class: Gastropoda
- Subclass: Patellogastropoda
- Superfamily: Patelloidea
- Family: Patellidae
- Genus: Scutellastra; H. Adams & A. Adams, 1854

Type species
- Patella plicata Born, 1778

Synonyms
- Ancistromesus Dall, 1871; Patella (Ancistromesus) Dall, 1871; Patella (Scutellastra) H. Adams & A. Adams, 1854; Patellanax Iredale, 1924 (junior synonym); Patellidea Thiele, 1891; Penepatella Iredale, 1929 (junior synonym)

= Scutellastra =

Genus of gastropods

Scutellastra is a genus of sea snails with gills, typical true limpets, marine gastropod molluscs in the family Patellidae, the true limpets.

In Branch et al. 2002, Scutellastra is mentioned as a genus while according to Vaught it is actually a subgenus. All species listed in Branch et al. as belonging to the genus of Scutellastra were not entered into the database under this genus, but were directly placed under Patella (Scutellastra) - being the right taxonomic classification according to Vaught.

== Species ==
Species within the genus Scutellastra include:

- Scutellastra aphanes (Robson, 1986)
- Scutellastra argenvillei (Krauss, 1848)
- † Scutellastra aurorae (C. A. Fleming, 1973)
- Scutellastra barbara (Linnaeus, 1758)
- Scutellastra chapmani (Tenison-Woods, 1875)
- Scutellastra cochlear (Born, 1778)
- † Scutellastra cooperi Powell, 1938
- Scutellastra exusta (Reeve, 1854)
- Scutellastra flexuosa (Quoy & Gaimard, 1834)
- Scutellastra granularis (Linnaeus, 1758)
- Scutellastra kermadecensis (Pilsbry, 1894)
- Scutellastra laticostata (Blainville, 1825)
- Scutellastra longicosta (Lamarck, 1819)
- Scutellastra mexicana (Broderip & G.B. Sowerby I, 1829)
- Scutellastra miliaris (Philippi, 1848)
- Scutellastra natalensis (F. Krauss, 1848)
- Scutellastra obtecta (Krauss, 1848)
- Scutellastra optima (Pilsbry, 1927)
- Scutellastra peronii (Blainville, 1825)
- Scutellastra tabularis (Krauss, 1848)
- Scutellastra tucopiana Powell, 1925

Species brought into synonymy

- Scutellastra pica (Reeve, 1854): synonym of Scutellastra exusta (Reeve, 1854)
