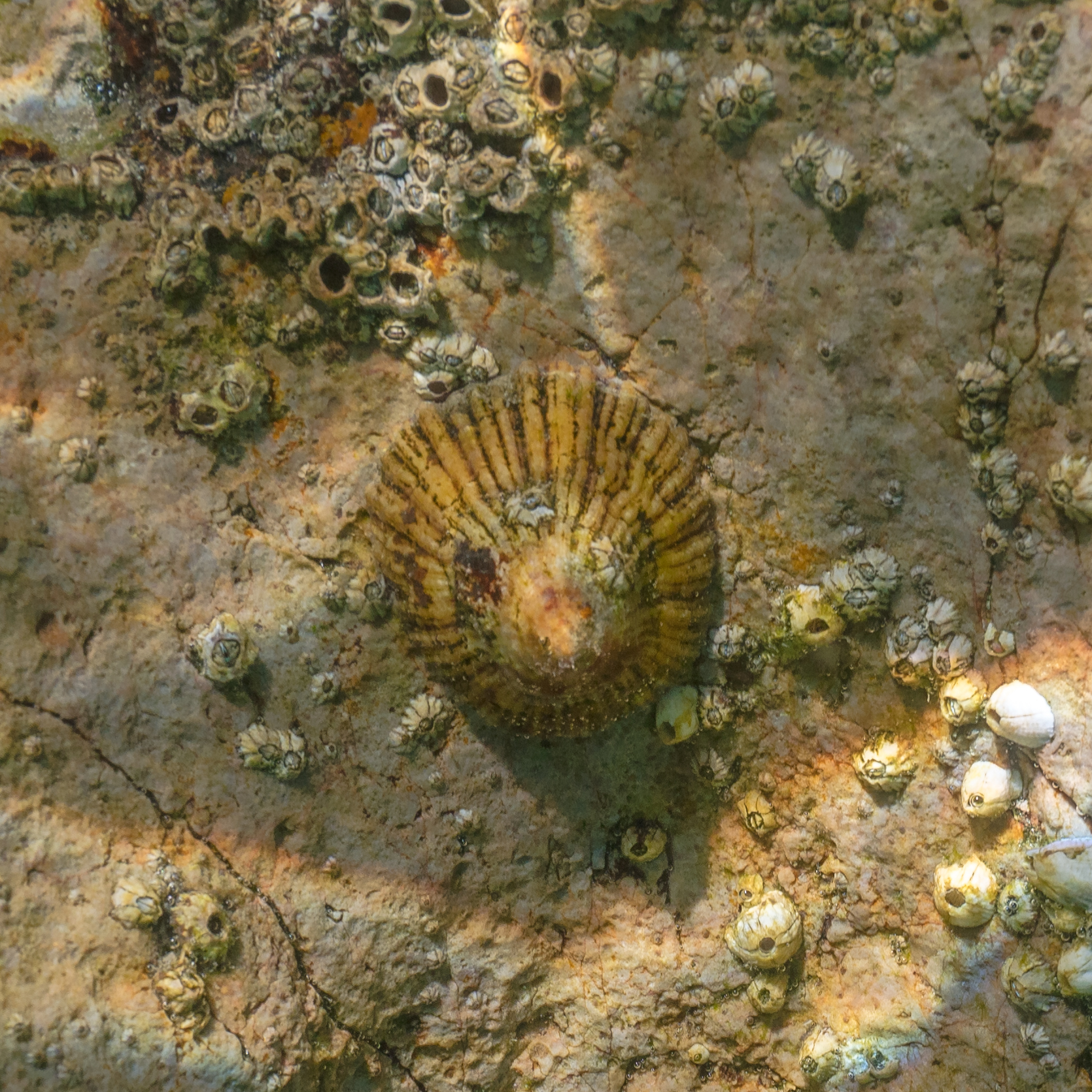
- Patella vulgata

Scientific classification
- Domain: Eukaryota
- Kingdom: Animalia
- Phylum: Mollusca
- Class: Gastropoda
- Subclass: Patellogastropoda
- Superfamily: Patelloidea; Rafinesque, 1815

Synonyms
- Nacelloidea Thiele, 1891

= Patelloidea =

Superfamily of gastropods

Patelloidea is a taxonomic superfamily of sea snails or true limpets, marine gastropod molluscs in the subclass Patellogastropoda.

== Genera ==
Families within the superfamily Patelloidea include:

- Nacellidae Thiele, 1891
- Patellidae Rafinesque, 1815
