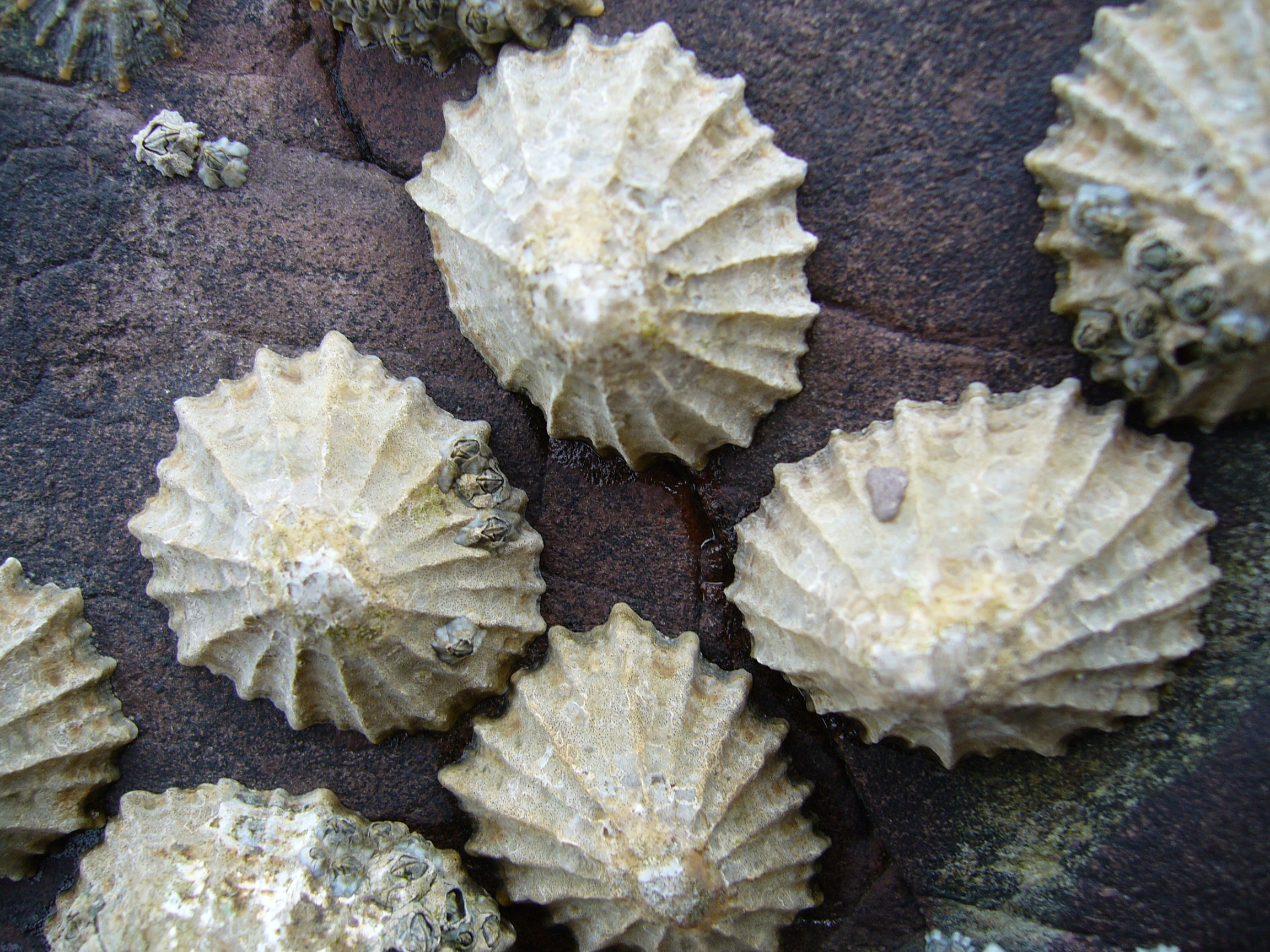
- A group of live Patella vulgata on an intertidal rock

Scientific classification
- Kingdom: Animalia
- Phylum: Mollusca
- Class: Gastropoda
- Subclass: Patellogastropoda
- Superfamily: Patelloidea
- Family: Patellidae; Rafinesque, 1815

Genera
- 4 extant genera (see text)

= Patellidae =

Family of gastropods

Patellidae is a taxonomic family of true limpets, marine gastropod molluscs in the superfamily Patelloidea. (The superfamily Patelloidea should not be confused with the similar-sounding genus of true limpets Patelloida which is in the family Lottiidae within the superfamily Lottioidea, also part of the Patellogastropoda.)

The largest known limpet in the world is Scutellastra mexicana that can reach 35.5 cm (14.0 in) in length.

== Taxonomy ==
A cladogram showing phylogenic relations of Patellogastropoda based on molecular phylogeny research by Nakano & Ozawa (2007):

- Patellogastropoda
  - - - Lottiidae (including Acmaea and Niveotectura)
      - - - Pectinodontidae
          - Lepetidae
        - Nacellidae
    - Patellidae
  - Eoacmaeidae

== Genera ==
There are four extant genera in the family Patellidae:

- Cymbula H. & A. Adams, 1854
- Helcion Montfort, 1810
- Patella Linnaeus, 1758
- Scutellastra H. Adams & A. Adams, 1854

There are two exclusively fossil genera:

- † Berlieria de Loriol, 1903
- † Proscutum P. Fischer, 1885

=== Synonyms ===
Synonyms include the following:

- Ansates G.B. Sowerby II [ex Klein], 1839: synonym of Patella Linnaeus, 1758
- Laevipatella Pallary, 1920: synonym of Cymbula H. Adams & A. Adams, 1854
- Patellanax Iredale, 1924: synonym of Scutellastra H. Adams & A. Adams, 1854 (junior synonym)
- Patellidea Thiele, 1891: synonym of Scutellastra H. Adams & A. Adams, 1854
- Patellona Thiele, 1891: synonym of Cymbula H. Adams & A. Adams, 1854
- Patina Gray, 1847: synonym of Patella Linnaeus, 1758
- Patinastra Thiele, 1891: synonym of Helcion Montfort, 1810
- Penepatella Iredale, 1929: synonym of Scutellastra H. Adams & A. Adams, 1854 (junior synonym)

== Human uses ==
Some limpet species in this family are used as a food source in various countries.

A study of Patella caerulea found that this limpet reduced the cover of algae and barnacles on steel panels suspended in sea water in a commercial port, suggesting that the limpet could be used to inhibit fouling of ship hulls.

== See also ==
- Limpet
