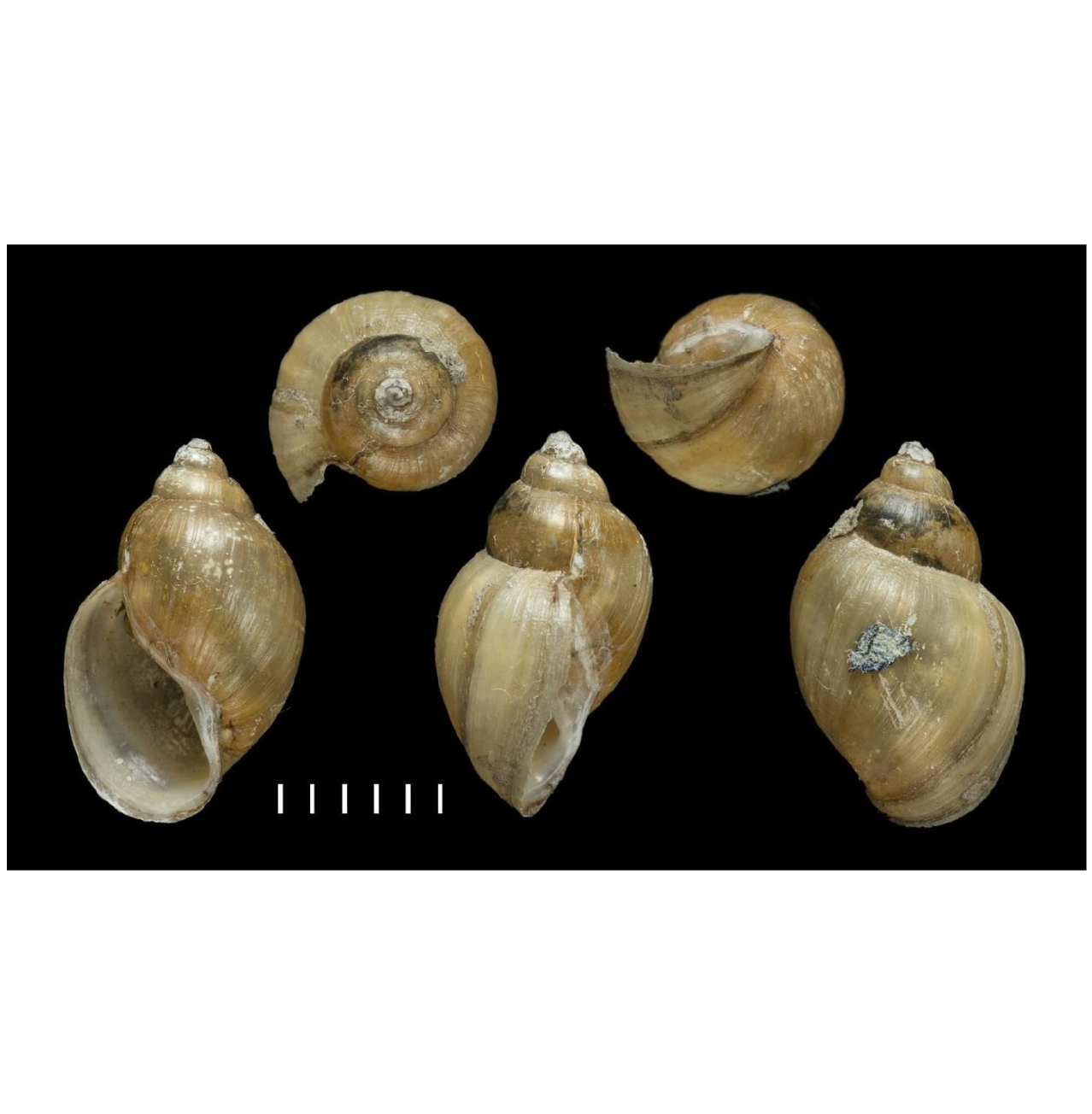
- The syntype

Scientific classification
- Kingdom: Animalia
- Phylum: Mollusca
- Class: Gastropoda
- Superorder: Hygrophila
- Family: Planorbidae
- Genus: Glyptophysa
- Species: G. caledonica

Binomial name
- Glyptophysa caledonica (Morelet, 1857)

Synonyms
- Physa caledonica Morelet, 1857; superseded combination; Physastra caledonica (Morelet, 1857); superseded combination

= Glyptophysa caledonica =

Species of gastropod

Glyptophysa caledonica is a small, dark-colored species of freshwater snail in the family Planorbidae. It is found in New Caledonia.

== Taxonomy ==
Glyptophysa caledonica was originally described under the name Physa caledonica in 1857 by nautralist Pierre Marie Arthur Morelet. Specimens were collected from Balade, New Caledonia. In 1957, the species was moved to the genus Isidorella, and in 1961, moved again to Physastra.

Physa kanakina has been given as a taxonomic synonym of this species, but this is not always recognized. G. caledonica has also been considered a synonym of Glyptophysa nasuta.

One specimen used in Morelet's description (a syntype) is located in the collections of the Natural History Museum in London.

== Description ==
The dark, oval-shaped shell of Glyptophysa caledonica measures 12 mm (0.47 in) in length and 7 mm (0.28 in) in diameter. Its color has been described as being dark, but also brown or yellow-brown. There are 4.5 shell revolutions, or whorls. The final (body) whorl in much larger than the others. The spire, a structure formed by stacks of whorls, is relatively short. The internal pillar of the shell (columella) is twisted. The shell opening (aperture) is oval-shaped. There may be a sculpture of raised lines on the exterior of the shell.

This species is similar to Glyptophysa hispida, but is darker in coloration.

== Distribution and habitat ==
Glyptophysa caledonica is known from New Caledonia, where it has been described from Balade, as well as Hienghène.
