= Glyptophysa jukesii =

Scientific classification
- Kingdom: Animalia
- Phylum: Mollusca
- Class: Gastropoda
- Superorder: Hygrophila
- Family: Planorbidae
- Genus: Glyptophysa
- Species: G. jukesii

Binomial name
- Glyptophysa jukesii (H. Adams, 1861)

Synonyms
- Glyptophysa (Oppletora) jukesii (H. Adams, 1861); alternative representation; Physa jukesii (H. Adams, 1861); superseded combination; Physopsis jukesii H. Adams, 1861; original combination

Species of gastropod

Glyptophysa jukesii, or Jukes's pouch snail, is a species of freshwater snail in the family Planorbidae. It is the only species in the subgenus Glyptophysa (Oppletora). The snail inhabits several freshwater habitats in Australia, where it feeds on algae and detritus. It is distinct from related species from its unique spherical shell and characteristics of its reproductive tract.

== Taxonomy ==
Glyptophysa jukesii was discovered in Port Essington, Australia by a Mr. Jukes. In 1861, the species was formally described by Henry Adams under the name Physopsis jukesii. In 1882, this name was recognized as likely to be false, as the genus Physopsis was only known from South Africa. However, it was not until 1943 that the species received a new name; Oppletora jukesii, in a new monotypic genus. However, differences between Oppletora and the genus Glyptophysa were found to be too small, and in 1988, Oppletora was officially demoted to a subgenus of Glyptophysa. G. jukesii remains the only species in this subgenus.

Two type specimens are known, both of which are syntypes, and both of which are housed in the collections of the Natural History Museum in London.

== Description ==
The white, left-coiling (sinistral) shell of Glyptophysa jukesii is described as somewhat spherical, nearly as wide as it is tall. The shell makes two to four revolutions, or whorls, stacking to form a very short, round spire. The final (body) whorl is the most prominent, making up the majority of the shell. The shell opening (aperture) is somewhat oval-shaped, and bears a continuous lip. The central pillar of the shell (the columella) is short and sharply angled. The short, round spire and angled columella make this species quite distinct from other species of Glyptophysa.

The radula (a tongue-like organ) has rows of teeth, with the central (rachidian) tooth having two cusps and no bumps or denticles. Three-cusped lateral teeth, each with a denticle, border the rachidian tooth on each side of the row. On lateral teeth further from the center, one of the outermost cusps divides into three cusps. The furthest teeth from the center, the marginal teeth, are comb-like, the cusps having further shrunk and divided.

Another important distinguishing characteristic of this species is its reproductive tract. G. jukesii has both a relatively long stylet and a relatively short flagellum on the penis, distinguishing it from other species of Glyptophysa, as well as the genus Isidorella, which does not possess these structures at all. Furthermore, the penis of Isidorella is branched, while that of G. jukesii is not. Other characteristics of the reproductive tract include a vas deferens that opens to the side of the penial complex, as well as a balloon-shaped bursa copulatrix on the rear end of the vagina.

== Distribution and ecology ==
Glyptophysa jukesii is known from freshwater streams, ponds, billabongs, and other bodies of water in Australia. It is found along the Gulf of Carpentaria and the Timor Sea in Western Australia and the Northern Territory. Other sources report it from Kimberley to Arnhem Land. It has been found alongside other gastropod species, including the genera Gyraulus, Austropeplea, and Notopala. It may inhabit a variety of substrates, including aquatic vegetation and wood, where it grazes on algae and decaying organic matter. This species lays eggs covered in a kidney-shaped jelly.
