= Glyptophysa nasuta =

- As Physa tetrica

Conservation status
- Least Concern (IUCN 3.1)

Scientific classification
- Kingdom: Animalia
- Phylum: Mollusca
- Class: Gastropoda
- Superorder: Hygrophila
- Family: Planorbidae
- Genus: Glyptophysa
- Species: G. nasuta

Binomial name
- Glyptophysa nasuta (Morelet, 1857)

Synonyms
- Glyptophysa (Glyptophysa) nasuta (Morelet, 1857); alternative representation; Physa gibberula Mousson, 1870; superseded combination; Physa kanakina Gassies, 1857; junior subjective synonym; Physa nasuta Morelet, 1857; superseded combination; Physa tetrica Morelet, 1857; junior subjective synonym; Physa tetrica var. noumeensis Crosse, 1868; junior subjective synonym; Physastra nasuta (Morelet, 1857); superseded combination

Species of gastropod

Glyptophysa nasuta is a small species of freshwater snail in the family Planorbidae. It is unclear where the species originated, but is currently distributed across many southern and western Pacific islands. It is common where it occurs.

== Taxonomy ==
Glyptophysa nasuta was originally described in 1857 by Pierre Marie Arthur Morelet from specimens collected in New Caledonia. It was originally given the name Physa nasuta. This species has several additional synonyms from taxa that are no longer valid. One such taxon is Physa tetrica, which Morelet described as its own species alongside P. nasuta. Exactly which taxa are considered synonymous differs slightly between sources, but may additionally include Physa kanakina and Physa gibberula. Other sources suggest that G. nasuta and other Glyptophysa species are likely to be synonyms themselves. Additionally, a letter from the 1880s or 1890s supposedly details an observation of copulation between different New Caledonian species of Glyptophysa.

One syntype (a specimen used to help define the species) is known from the name Physa nasuta, and is located at the Natural History Museum in London. Six other specimens are known from three taxonomic synonyms.

== Description ==
Glyptophysa nasuta has an oblong, pointed, brownish-red shell measuring 22 mm (0.87 in) in length by 12 mm (0.47 in) in diameter. The shell makes six revolutions, or whorls, with the inflated final (body) whorl making up about 2/3 or 3/4 of the total shell length. The shell's central pillar (columella) is twisted. The shell opening, called the aperture, is large and oval shaped, forming an acute angle at the rear.

== Distribution and habitat ==
Glyptophysa nasuta is known from several Pacific islands, including its type locality in New Caledonia (where it was originally described), as well as islands in the countries of Vanuatu, Tonga, Fiji, Samoa, and the Cook Islands. However, its exact native range is unclear, as the species may be introduced. Its introduction may have been aided by the aquarium trade or by the exchange of the taro plant. Due to the large area the species occupies, along with its apparent abundance, the IUCN rated G. nasuta as a least concern species in 2011.

This snail may be found in a variety of natural and man-made habitats, including ponds, ditches, and taro farms, as well as on rocks in fast-flowing streams or rivers. It has been recorded alongside several other species from the genus, including Glyptophysa obtusa, Glyptophysa hispida, and Glyptophysa caledonica.
