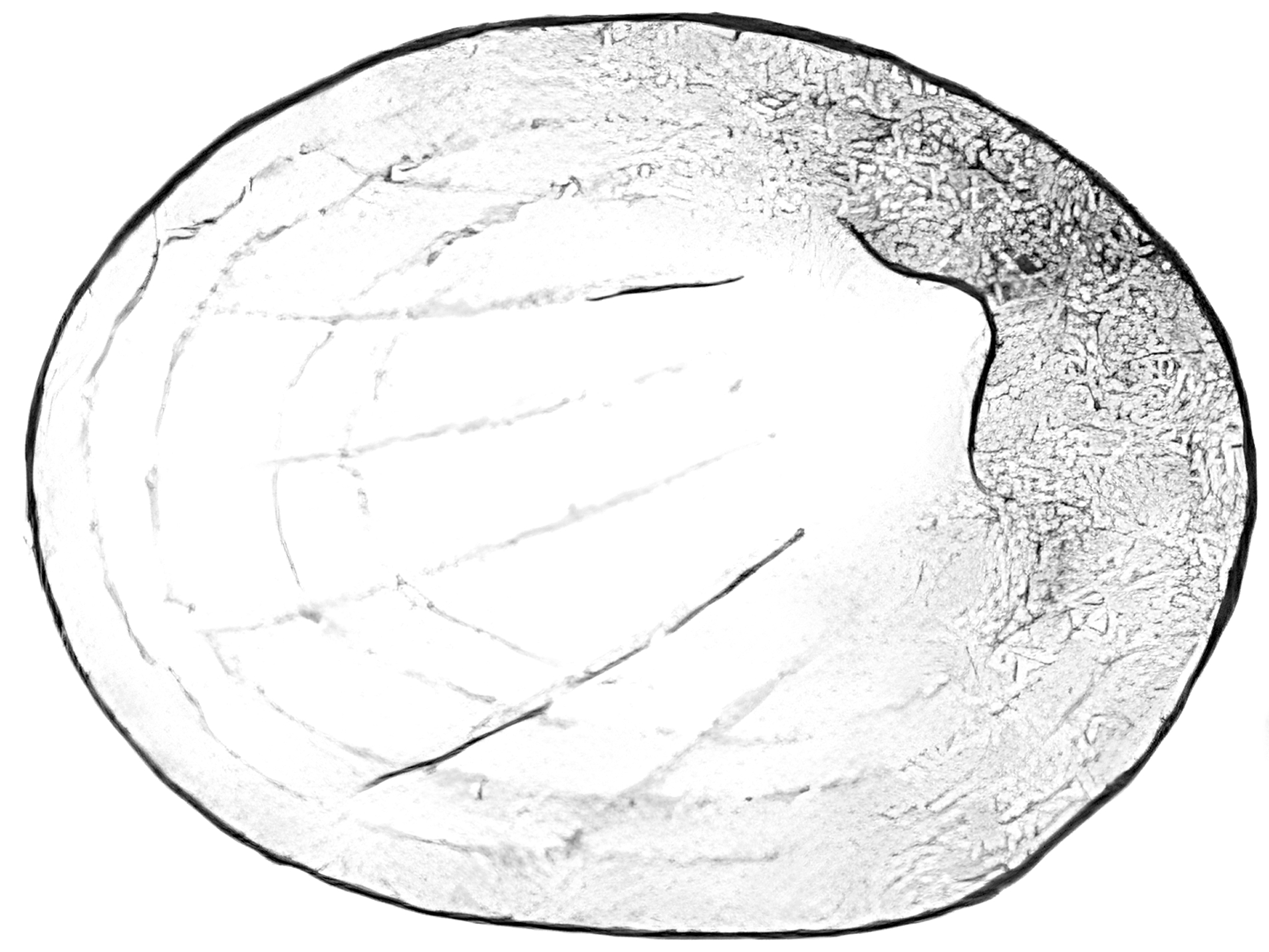
- Gundlachia lucasi, Suter. 3×2 mm

Conservation status
- Data Deficient (IUCN 3.1)

Scientific classification
- Kingdom: Animalia
- Phylum: Mollusca
- Class: Gastropoda
- Superorder: Hygrophila
- Family: Planorbidae
- Genus: Gundlachia
- Species: G. lucasi

Binomial name
- Gundlachia lucasi Suter, 1905

= Gundlachia lucasi =

Species of gastropod

Gundlachia lucasi is a species of small freshwater snail or limpet, an aquatic pulmonate gastropod mollusk or micromollusk in the family Planorbidae.

== Shell description ==
Shell obliquely conical, thin, semitransparent, horn-colour, covered by a blackish coating. Apex inclined to the right, situated at the posterior third of the length; convex anteriorly, slightly concave on the posterior slope; a few concentric lines of growth. Aperture oval; peritreme sharp, extremely fragile.

The shell length is up to 4 mm, the width up to 2.75 mm, and the height up to 1.5 mm.

== Anatomy ==
These animals have a pallial lung, as do all pulmonate snails, but they also have a false gill or "pseudobranch". This serves as a gill as, in their non-tidal habitat, these limpets never reach the surface for air.

== Distribution ==
This freshwater limpet is endemic to the North Island of New Zealand.

== Habitat ==
These tiny limpets are found attached to stems and undersides of leaves of aquatic plants in quiet waters.
