= Miratesta celebensis =

Conservation status
- Vulnerable (IUCN 2.3)

Scientific classification
- Kingdom: Animalia
- Phylum: Mollusca
- Class: Gastropoda
- Superorder: Hygrophila
- Family: Planorbidae
- Genus: Miratesta
- Species: M. celebensis

Binomial name
- Miratesta celebensis P. Sarasin & F. Sarasin, 1898

Species of gastropod

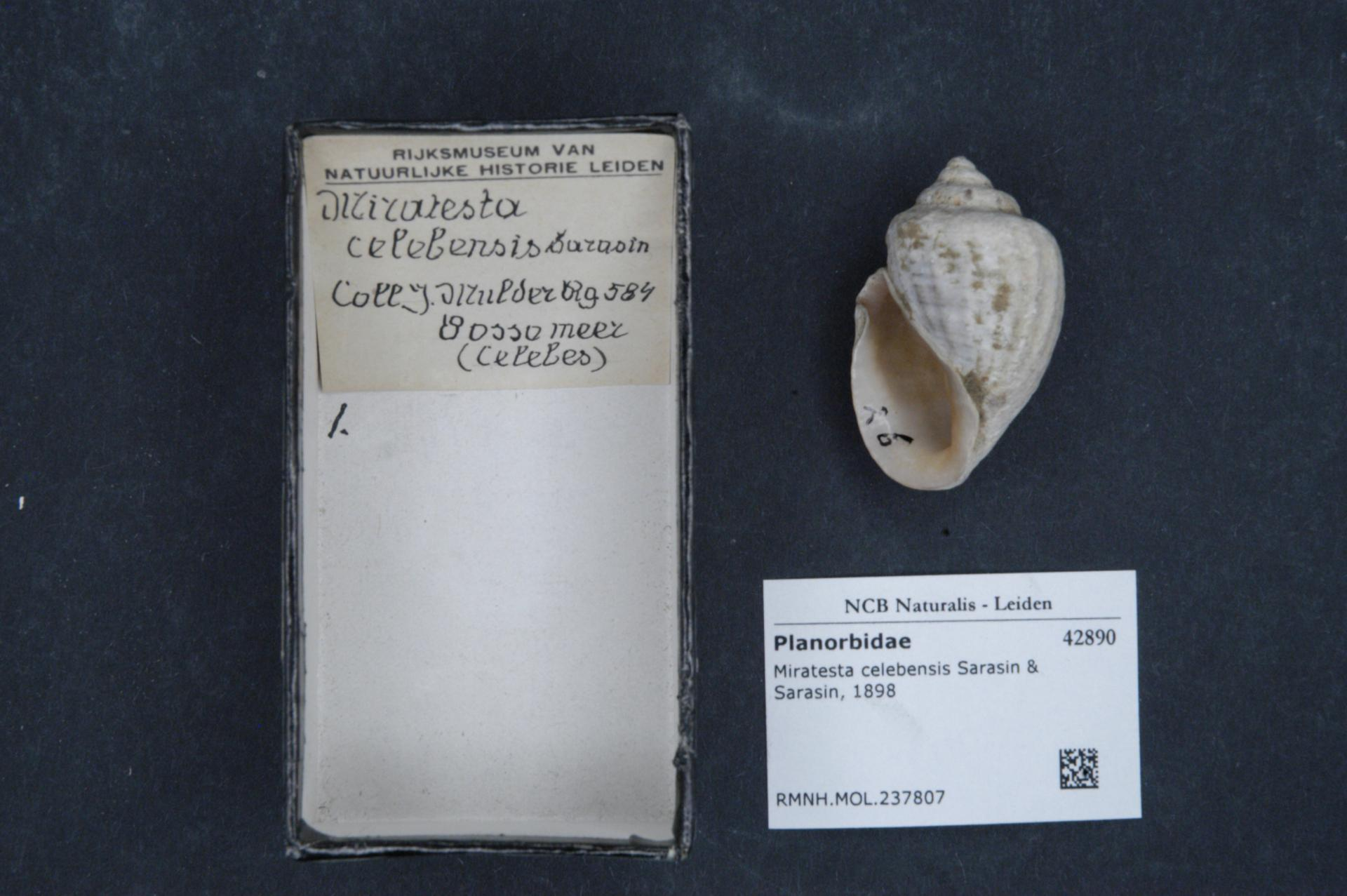

Miratesta celebensis is a species of freshwater air-breathing snails, aquatic pulmonate gastropod mollusks in the family Planorbidae, the ram's horn snails, or planorbids. Like all other planorbids it has a sinistral or left-coiling shell.

This species is endemic to Indonesia. Its natural habitat is freshwater lakes.
