= Gundlachia ticaga =

Conservation status
- Least Concern (IUCN 3.1)

Scientific classification
- Kingdom: Animalia
- Phylum: Mollusca
- Class: Gastropoda
- Superorder: Hygrophila
- Family: Planorbidae
- Genus: Gundlachia
- Species: G. ticaga

Binomial name
- Gundlachia ticaga (Er. Marcus & Ev. Marcus, 1962)

Species of gastropod

Gundlachia ticaga is a species of small freshwater snail or limpet, an aquatic gastropod mollusc in the family Planorbidae, the ram's horn snails and their allies.

== Distribution ==
G. ticaga is endemic to Argentina, where it was recorded in Iguazú National Park in the Misiones Province, and Brazil, where it is known from the regions of Rio de Janeiro, Goiás, Rio Grande do Sul and São Paulo.

== Habitat and Ecology ==
G. ticaga occurs in polluted and unpolluted streams and rivers in Brazil. It is also found in irrigation ditches. Like several other species of freshwater gastropods, it is the host of a trematode worm, Echinostome cercaria, and was found to associate with the roots of the Water Hyacinth species Eichhornia azurea and E. crassipes.
