= Glyptophysa fulgata =

Conservation status
- Endangered (IUCN 3.1)

Scientific classification
- Kingdom: Animalia
- Phylum: Mollusca
- Class: Gastropoda
- Superorder: Hygrophila
- Family: Planorbidae
- Genus: Glyptophysa
- Species: G. fulgata

Binomial name
- Glyptophysa fulgata (van Benthem Jutting, 1963)

Synonyms
- Physastra fulgata van Benthem Jutting, 1963; original combination

Species of mollusc

Glyptophysa fulgata is an endangered species of freshwater snail in the family Planorbidae. It is found exclusively in the Panai Lakes in Western New Guinea, Indonesia. This species may be eaten by invasive fish and crustaceans within its habitat, contributing to its decline.

== Taxonomy ==
Glyptophysa fulgata was first described in 1963 by W. S. S. van Benthem Jutting under the name Physastra fulgata. Many specimens were collected from Western New Guinea for this description. A total of six type specimens are known; five paratypes (secondary specimens) and one undesignated specimen. Four paratypes are located at the Museum für Naturkunde in Germany, while the remaining paratype and undesignated specimen are in the collections of the Naturalis Biodiversity Center in the Netherlands.

== Distribution and habitat ==
Glyptophysa fulgata has only been recorded from all three of the Paniai Lakes in Western New Guinea, Indonesia. Combined, the lakes make up an area of about 390 km^{2} (150 mi^{2}), of which about 336 km^{2} (130 mi^{2}) is used by the snails. Several invasive species that may predate upon G. fulgata are present in the lakes, including two species of tilapia, the common carp, and the crayfish Cherax. This is the major reason given by the IUCN for its classification as an endangered species. Further threats may include wastewater and other pollution from nearby houses and farms, but this is not considered significant. There are no plans to conserve the species as of 2026.
