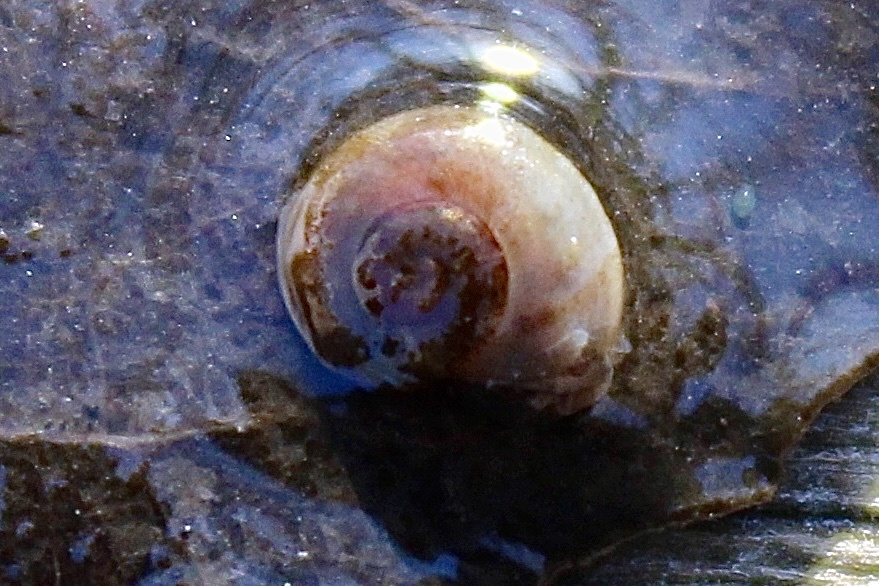
- Menetus dilatatus (Gould, 1841)

Scientific classification
- Kingdom: Animalia
- Phylum: Mollusca
- Class: Gastropoda
- Superorder: Hygrophila
- Family: Planorbidae
- Genus: Menetus
- Species: M. dilatatus

Binomial name
- Menetus dilatatus (Gould, 1841)

Synonyms
- Planorbis dilatatus Gould, 1841; Micromenetus dilatatus; Planorbis opercularis Gould, 1847

= Menetus dilatatus =

Species of gastropod

Menetus dilatatus is a species of small air-breathing freshwater snail, an aquatic pulmonate gastropod mollusk in the family Planorbidae, the ram's horn snails.

== Shell description ==
The shell is small, of a yellowish green-color, minutely wrinkled by the lines of growth. The spire is flat, composed of 2.5-3 whorls, separated by a well-defined suture. The outer whorl has a sharp margin on a level with the spire, diminishing near, but still modifying, the aperture. Below this line the whorl is very convexly rounded so as to encircle a small, deep, abruptly formed umbilicus. This whorl rapidly enlarges, and terminates in a very large, not very oblique aperture, with the lip expanded so as to make it trumpet-shaped.

The width of the shell is 2–3 mm. The height of the shell is 0.9 mm.

== Distribution ==
The species is native to North America. The type locality is Nantucket island and Hingham, Massachusetts, USA.

Its non-native distribution includes:

- Czech Republic - non-indigenous, in Bohemia around Elber river and in Southern Bohemia
- Germany
- Netherlands
- Poland
- Great Britain

== Habitat ==
This snail lives in freshwater biotopes.
