= Glyptophysa hispida =

- Multiple angles of the syntype

Scientific classification
- Kingdom: Animalia
- Phylum: Mollusca
- Class: Gastropoda
- Superorder: Hygrophila
- Family: Planorbidae
- Genus: Glyptophysa
- Species: G. hispida

Binomial name
- Glyptophysa hispida (Morelet, 1857)

Synonyms
- Physa hispida Morelet, 1857; superseded combination; Physastra hispida (Morelet, 1857); superseded combination

Species of mollusc

Glyptophysa hispida is a small species of freshwater snail in the family Planorbidae. It has a rounded shell decorated with fine lines and small hairs. It is found in New Caledonia.

== Taxonomy ==
G. hispida was first described as Physa hispida by Pierre Marie Arthur Morelet in 1857. Specimens were collected alongside several other gastropod species in New Caledonia. In 1871, the variety "γ pilosa" was described, and in 1894, a variety "β" is referenced. Additionally, the species has previously been referred to by the names Isidora hispida in 1956, and Physastra hispida in 1961. The genus Physastra was eventually merged with Glyptophysa in 1988.

== Description ==
Glyptophysa hispida has a swollen, oval-shaped shell measuring 11 mm (0.43 in) in length by 7 mm (0.28 in) in diameter. The shell makes 4.5 revolutions, or whorls, which stack on top of each other to form a short spire. The length of the spire has been variously described as making up roughly a quarter to a third of the total length of the shell. The shell opening (aperture) is oval-shaped, but is angular at the rear. The exterior of the shell may be decorated by fine striae. The twisted central pillar (columella) is white. Additionally, the shell's exterior may possess small hairs. This white columella and the presence of hairs distinguish this species from other New Caledonian gastropods. It may furthermore be distinguished from Glyptophysa caledonica by its lighter coloration.

== Distribution ==
This species is known from several locations in New Caledonia. It is known from its type locality, where it was first collected in Balade, New Caledonia. It may also be found in Hiengène, Canala, and Nouméa.
