= Leichhardtia =

Leichhardtia is the scientific name of two genera of organisms and may refer to:

- Leichhardtia (gastropod), a genus of snails in the family Planorbidae
- Leichhardtia (plant), a genus of plants in the family Apocynaceae
