= Planorbula armigera =

Conservation status
- Secure (NatureServe)

Scientific classification
- Kingdom: Animalia
- Phylum: Mollusca
- Class: Gastropoda
- Superorder: Hygrophila
- Family: Planorbidae
- Genus: Planorbula
- Species: P. armigera

Binomial name
- Planorbula armigera (Say, 1821)

Species of mollusc

Planorbula armigera is a species of gastropods belonging to the family Planorbidae.

The species is found in Northern America.
