= Glyptophysa doopi =

Conservation status
- Near Threatened (IUCN 3.1)

Scientific classification
- Kingdom: Animalia
- Phylum: Mollusca
- Class: Gastropoda
- Superorder: Hygrophila
- Family: Planorbidae
- Genus: Glyptophysa
- Species: G. doopi

Binomial name
- Glyptophysa doopi (Prashad, 1921)

Synonyms
- Glyptophysa (Glyptophysa) doopi (Prashad, 1921); alternative representation; Physastra doopi Prashad, 1921; original combination

Species of gastropod

Glyptophysa doopi is a small species of freshwater snail in the family Planorbidae. The species is named after den Doop, the person who discovered it. It is found in mountainous areas of northern and central Sumatra in Indonesia, where it is considered near threatened due to habitat destruction and degradation. It has a somewhat heart-shaped shell that changes colors from black at the tip to brown at the base.

== Taxonomy ==
Glyptophysa doopi was discovered by a Mr. den Doop in a stream near Berastagi on the island of Sumatra in Indonesia. In 1921, Baini Prashad described the species, naming it "Physastra doopi" to honor its discoverer.

This species has been hypothesized to be a variant of Glyptophysa sumatrana, but is considered a valid species by other sources.

== Description ==
The long, oval-shaped shell of Glyptophysa doopi measures between 14.3 to 16 mm (0.56 to 0.63 in) in length and 7.6 to 8.4 mm (0.30 to 0.33 in) in diameter. The shell varies in color, from black at the tip (apex) to brown at the end. There are between 5.5 and 6.5 shell revolutions (whorls), which are slightly inflated. The final (body) whorl is somewhat heart shaped, with the outer edge curving sharply towards the front end of the shell before curving back out. The inner edge is not strongly curved. The elliptical shell opening (aperture) is nearly as long as the shell itself, measuring between 8.8 to 10 mm (0.35 to 0.39 in) in height and 4.2 to 4.4 mm (0.17 to 0.17 in) in width. It comes to a sharp point at the back of the shell, and due to the heart-shape of the body whorl, has a characteristic termination at the front. The edge (lip) of the aperture is very thin, even described as being sharp. This lip is continuous around the aperture. The shell's surface is decorated with a sculpture of very fine raised lines or striae, appearing nearly smooth. The umbilicus (hollow space in the shell) is partially covered by a growth called a callus. The interior pillar of the shell (the columella) is inconspicuously folded towards the back of the shell.

This species is similar to Glyptophysa sumatrana, but may be distinguished by its shorter, wider shell with a short spire, narrow aperture, thin apertural lip, and less folded columella.

== Distribution and habitat ==
Glyptophysa doopi is known from two mountainous regions in northern and central Sumatra in Indonesia. There are eight confirmed occurrences of the species on the island, though it is likely that the species occupies areas outside of this known range, bringing its total habitat area to 5,000 km^{2} (1,900 mi^{2}) at maximum. It has been recorded in both flowing and stagnant waters, including streams and water holes, and even man-made water features such as ditches and rice fields. Its habitat is under threat of being destroyed and degraded by gold mining activities and oil palm farms, contributing to its IUCN classification of near threatened. No plans to conserve the species are in place as of 2026.

This snail, along with Mieniplotia scabra, may outcompete Radix rubiginosa in laboratory conditions, possibly due to the release of pheromones in the water.
