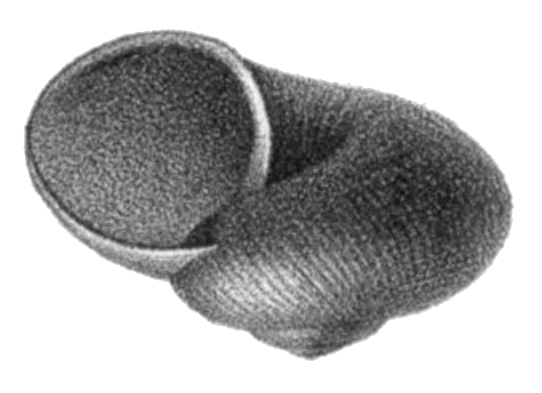
- an apertural view of the shell of Choanomphalus aorus

Scientific classification
- Kingdom: Animalia
- Phylum: Mollusca
- Class: Gastropoda
- Superorder: Hygrophila
- Family: Planorbidae
- Genus: Choanomphalus
- Species: C. aorus

Binomial name
- Choanomphalus aorus Bourguignat, 1860

= Choanomphalus aorus =

Species of gastropod

Choanomphalus aorus is a species of freshwater air-breathing snail, an aquatic pulmonate gastropod mollusk in the family Planorbidae, the ram's horn snails, or planorbids.

== Distribution ==
This species is found in Lake Baikal, Russia and in Angara River.

== Description ==
The width of the shell is 5 mm; the height of the shell is 3 mm.

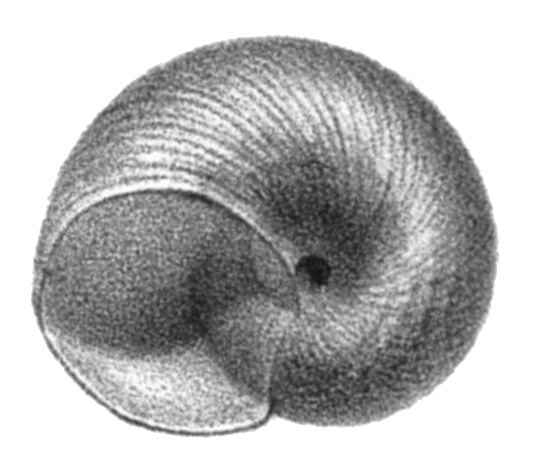
Apical view of the shell.

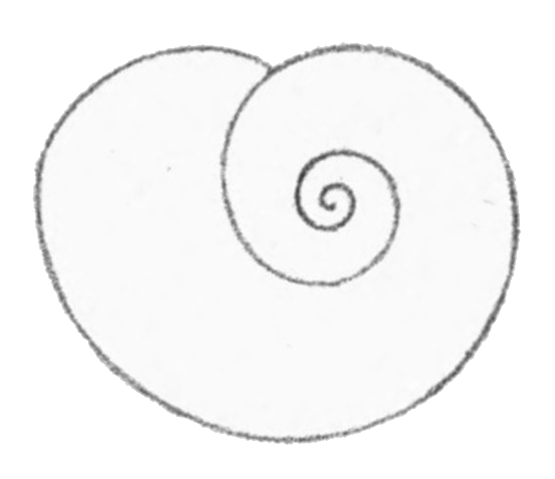
Umbilical view of the shell.
