= Glyptophysa keysseri =

Conservation status
- Vulnerable (IUCN 3.1)

Scientific classification
- Kingdom: Animalia
- Phylum: Mollusca
- Class: Gastropoda
- Superorder: Hygrophila
- Family: Planorbidae
- Genus: Glyptophysa
- Species: G. keysseri

Binomial name
- Glyptophysa keysseri (Kobelt, 1913)

Synonyms
- Physa keysseri Kobelt, 1913; original combination; Physastra keysseri (Kobelt, 1913); superseded combination

Species of mollusc

Glyptophysa keysseri is a small, vulnerable species of freshwater snail in the family Planorbidae. It is found exclusively in puddles at high altitude on an active volcano in Papua New Guinea. Though its habitat is remote, an eruption from the volcano could cause the extinction of the species.

== Taxonomy ==
Glyptophysa keysseri was described in 1913 by Wilhelm Kobelt from specimens collected on Mount Wangore (Bolau) in modern Papua New Guinea. It was originally given the name Physa keysseri.

== Description ==
Glyptophysa keysseri has a dark yellow, left-coiling (sinistral), moderately convex shell measuring 16 mm (0.63 in) in height and 10 mm (0.39 in) in diameter. The shell makes five revolutions (whorls), which stack to form a tower-like spire. The pear-shaped shell opening (aperture) measures about 9.5 mm (0.37 in) in length. The shell's exterior may be decorated with a sculpture of fine, irregular lines (striae).

== Distribution and habitat ==
Glyptophysa keysseri is known exclusively from its type locality, where it was first described. Kobelt discovered the species in freshwater pools at an altitude of 3,800 m (12,500 ft) on New Britain Island in Papua New Guinea. The mountain which it inhabits, Mount Wangore, is an active volcano, though eruptions have not been recorded for over 100 years. If an eruption occurred, it could wipe out the species, which is why in 2026, the IUCN classified the species as vulnerable. Other than volcanic eruptions, this species faces no known threats, as its habitat remains remote and void of human activity.
