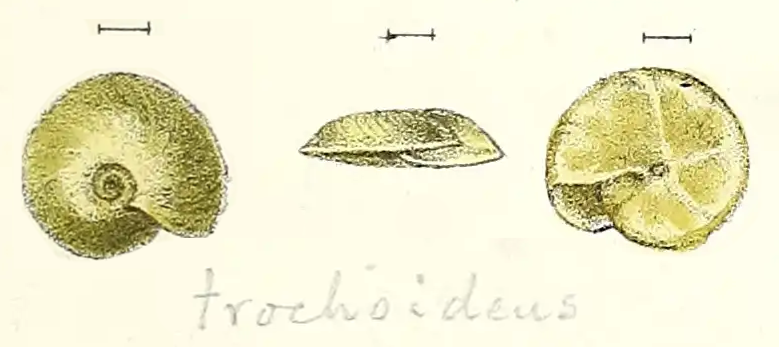

Scientific classification
- Kingdom: Animalia
- Phylum: Mollusca
- Class: Gastropoda
- Superorder: Hygrophila
- Family: Planorbidae
- Genus: Trochorbis
- Species: T. trochoideus

Binomial name
- Trochorbis trochoideus (W. H. Benson), 1836

Synonyms
- Planorbis sindicus W. H. Benson, 1850; Planorbis trochoideus W. H. Benson, 1836; original combination; Segmentina (Trochorbis) trochoideus (W. H. Benson, 1836; unaccepted combination; Segmentina kennardi Bullen, 1906; junior synonym

= Trochorbis trochoideus =

Species of gastropod

Trochorbis trochoideus is a small species of freshwater snail in the family Planorbidae. It is the type species of the genus Trochorbis. It has been found across much of South and Southeast Asia, including Pakistan, India, Thailand, Laos, and Indonesia. It is an intermediate host of the human-infecting fluke Fasciolopsis buski.

== Taxonomy ==
Trochorbis trochoideus was originally discovered by William Henry Benson in 1835 from Barrackpore park in the Kolkata metropolitan area in India. Individuals were found in water-filled containers alongside aquatic vegetation and other snail species. Benson subsequently used these specimens to describe the species in 1836, giving it the name Planorbis trochoideus. Two additional species, Segmentina kennardi and Planorbis sindicus, are now classified as synonymous with T. trochoideus. This species is the type species of its genus, Trochorbis.

One of the original specimens collected by Benson (a syntype) is now located in the Museum of Comparative Zoology at Harvard University.

== Distribution ==
Trochorbis trochoideus likely has a large distribution that covers much of Asia. Specimens have been found in small artificial pools in Barrackpore, India, the Indus River in the upper Sindh province of Pakistan, Mount Singgalang in Indonesia, ponds in Matlab, Bangladesh, the Phang-Nga province of Thailand, the Khammouane province of Laos, and Inle Lake in Myanmar.

Shells from the species have also been found as both fossils and subfossils in an ancient lake deposit in Heho, Myanmar.

== Description ==
Trochorbis trochoideus has a translucent yellow or green shell with a diameter of 2.5 mm (0.098 in) and a height of 0.67 mm (0.026 in), though some sources report individuals as large as 7–9 mm (0.28–0.35 in) in diameter. The shell is pseudodextral (ultradextral) and trochoid-shaped, though some variation in this shape may be present. The shell is convex on the top and relatively flat on the bottom. The whorls (shell revolutions) are tightly wound, though the final (body) whorl is wide enough to obscure many of the inner whorls. The whorls are strongly keeled, and when viewed from the side, the shell has a truncated appearance. The umbilicus (center) of the shell is very small and is set deeply. Some sources observe inconspicuous internal segmentation, similar to that of Segmentina species, though others do not. The shell may possess sparse, white, concentric bands on each whorl.

This species is somewhat similar to the extinct species Anomalorbina nitidula due to their shared deeply set umbilicus. It may also be confused for Polypylis calathus, but can be distinguished by its smaller size and more acutely angled keel.

== Parasites ==
=== Fasciolopsis buski ===
Trochorbis trochoideus is one of three major intermediate host species for the trematode parasite Fasciolopsis buski, which causes fasciolopsiasis in humans. As larvae, these parasites burrow into the mantle (skin) of the snails, where they grow and develop as rediae before emerging as cercaria. Infections typically begin at the front of the snail, but migrate to the reproductive tract. The parasites cause extensive damage to the reproductive system in their snail hosts, including mechanical stress, degeneration of germ cells, and eventually the complete destruction of all reproductive cells.

In one experiment, the immune system of the snail did not kill any larvae, and no inflammatory response was observed. After about 21 days of being infected, the parasites began to emerge. No snails survived infection, and none were able to lay eggs. In contrast, a 1939 experiment saw no snail deaths due to infection, even when the number of larvae was high. The author noted that the snails seemed to develop some immunity to the infection. F. buski infections are thought to spread in Southeast Asian rice fields, as farmers introduce ducks to feed on the snails, allowing the parasites to complete their life cycle. Transmission to humans is hypothesized to spread via ingestion of aquatic plants that carry the larvae.

=== Others ===
This species does not seem to be susceptible to infection with the trematode Gastrodiscoides hominis.
