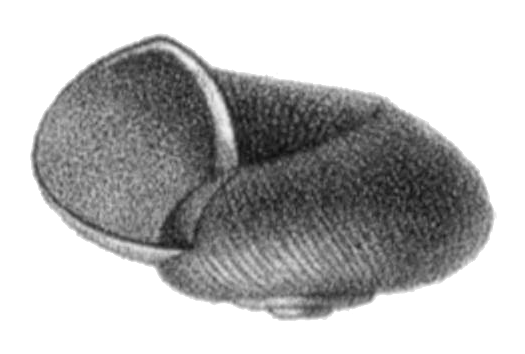
- an apertural view of the shell of Choanomphalus maacki maacki

Conservation status
- Least Concern (IUCN 3.1)

Scientific classification
- Kingdom: Animalia
- Phylum: Mollusca
- Class: Gastropoda
- Superorder: Hygrophila
- Family: Planorbidae
- Genus: Choanomphalus
- Species: C. maacki

Binomial name
- Choanomphalus maacki Gerstfeldt, 1859

Synonyms
- of C. maacki maacki: Choanomphalus bicarinatus W. Dybowski, 1901; Choanomphalus mesospiralis B. Dybowski & Grochmalicki, 1925; of C. maacki andrussowianus: Choanomphalus elatospiralis B. Dybowski & Grochmalicki, 1925; Choanomphalus andrussovianus B. Dybowski & Grochmalicki, 1925; of C. maacki elatior: Choanomphalus korotnevi elatior Lindholm, 1909

= Choanomphalus maacki =

Species of gastropod

Choanomphalus maacki is a species of freshwater air-breathing snail, an aquatic pulmonate gastropod mollusk in the family Planorbidae, the ram's horn snails, or planorbids.

Choanomphalus maacki is the type species of the genus Choanomphalus.

== Subspecies ==
- Choanomphalus maacki maacki Gerstfeldt, 1859
- Choanomphalus maacki andrussowianus (Lindholm, 1909)
- Choanomphalus maacki elatior Lindholm, 1909

However, IUCN Red List 2013 lists these three as synonyms.

== Distribution ==
This species is found in Lake Baikal, Russia. Its natural habitats are freshwater lakes and river mouths.

== Description ==
The width of the shell is 5–6 mm. The height of the shell is 2.5–3.0 mm.

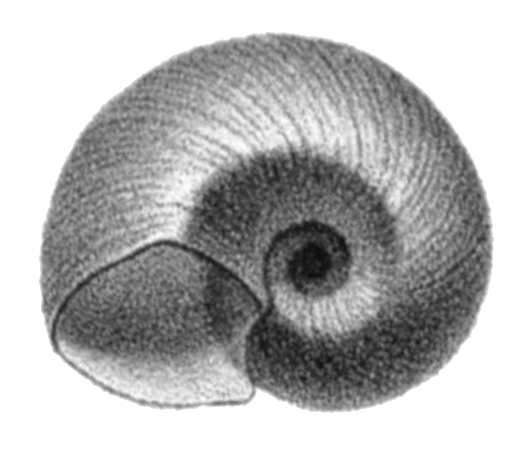
Apical view of the shell.

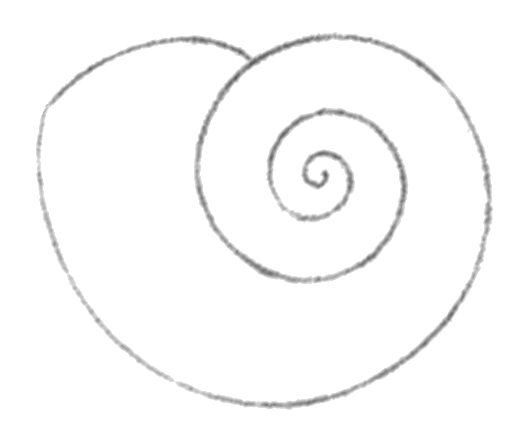
Umbilical view of the shell.
