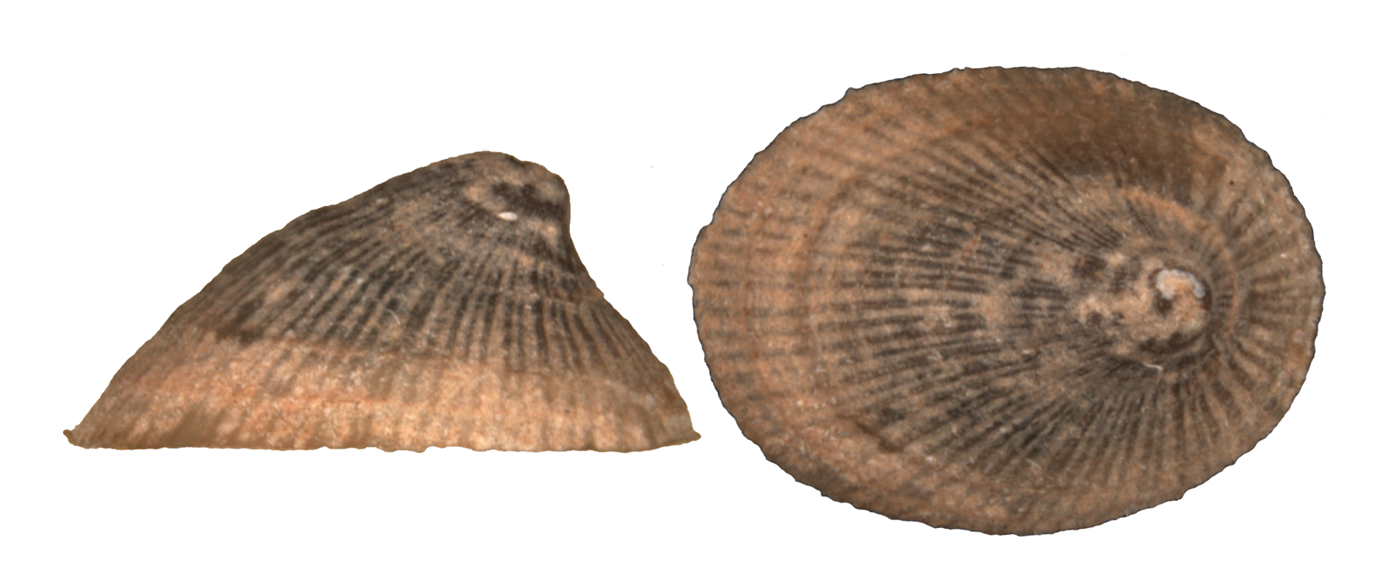
- A 100-year-old museum shell of the wicker ancylid from Tallaseehatchee Creek in Alabama

Conservation status
- Critically Endangered (IUCN 3.1)

- Critically Imperiled (NatureServe)

Scientific classification
- Kingdom: Animalia
- Phylum: Mollusca
- Class: Gastropoda
- Superorder: Hygrophila
- Family: Planorbidae
- Genus: Rhodacmea
- Species: R. filosa

Binomial name
- Rhodacmea filosa (Conrad, 1834)

Synonyms
- Ancylus filosus Conrad, 1834; Rhodacme filosa (Conrad, 1834)

= Rhodacmea filosa =

Species of gastropod

Rhodacmea filosa, the wicker ancylid, is a species of small, air-breathing, freshwater snail or limpet, a pulmonate gastropod in the family Planorbidae.

Rhodacmea filosa is the type species of the genus Rhodacmea.

== Distribution ==
This species is endemic to the United States and was thought to be extinct, until its rediscovery in 2011. It occurred in the Mobile River Basin rivers and their tributaries. The type locality is the Black Warrior River, south of Blount Springs, Alabama.

Over the past 20 years, extensive surveys that included hundreds of collecting sites in the drainages of the Coosa River, Cahaba River and Black Warrior River (its type locality) had failed to find Rhodacmea filosa. However, it does still persist in a Choccolocco Creek, a Coosa River tributary. Morphometric and phylogenetic analyses confirm the taxonomic validity of this material. Its survival in Choccolocco Creek is somewhat surprising, given the serious episodes of industrial pollution experienced by this watershed.

== Description ==
Rhodacmea filosa was originally discovered and described (under the name Ancylus filosus) by Timothy Abbott Conrad in 1834. Conrad's type description reads as follows:

ANCYLUS FILOSUS Shell regularly oval, rather elevated; with numerous radiating prominent lines; apex very prominent, inclined, eroded, not nearly central.

Rhodacmea filosa has an elevated patelliform shell with ribbing in the form of strong radiating lines running from the apex to the aperture.

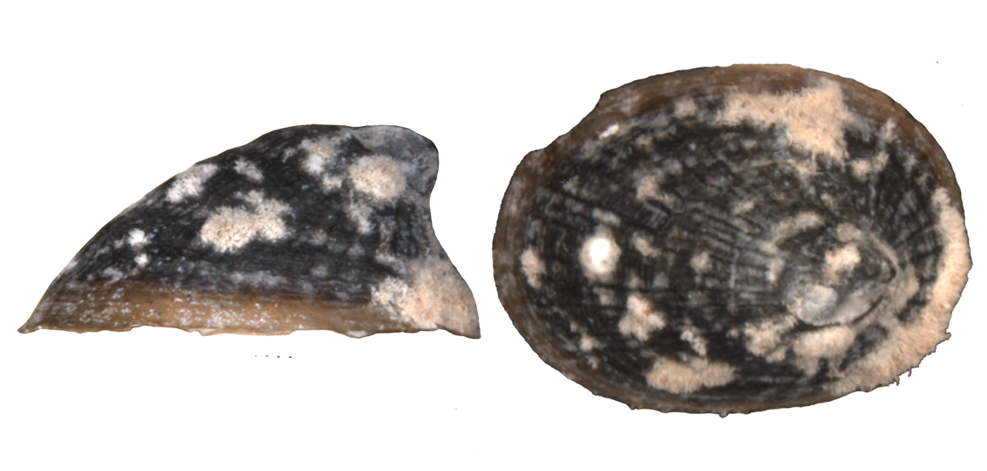
Rediscovered specimen

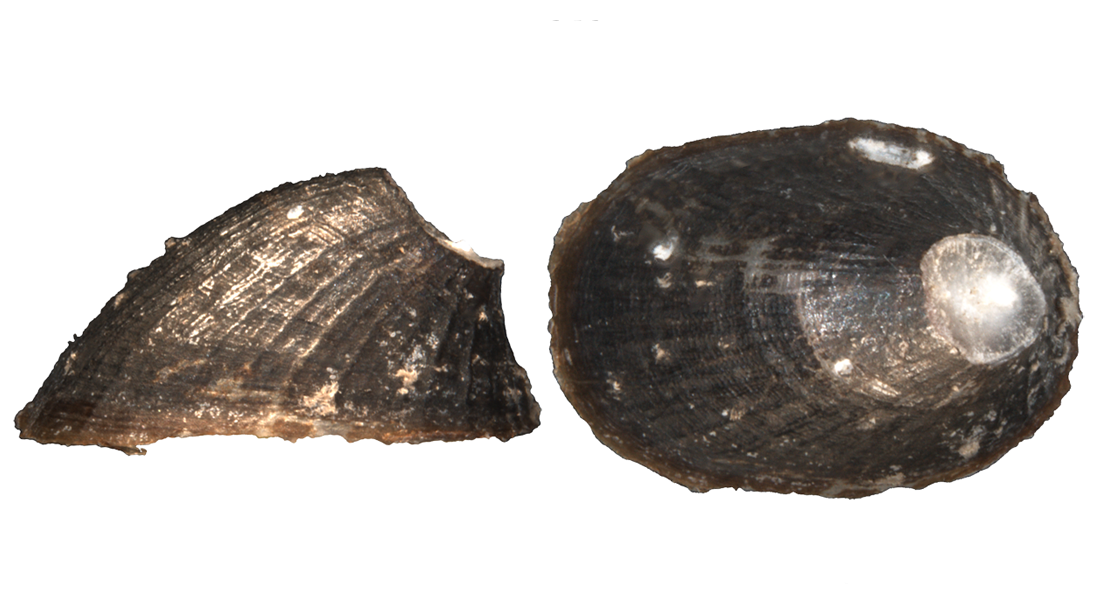
Rediscovered specimen
