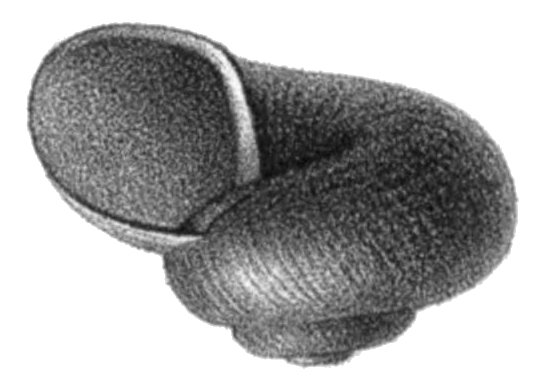
- An apertural view of the shell of Choanomphalus amauronius amauronius

Scientific classification
- Kingdom: Animalia
- Phylum: Mollusca
- Class: Gastropoda
- Superorder: Hygrophila
- Family: Planorbidae
- Genus: Choanomphalus
- Species: C. amauronius

Binomial name
- Choanomphalus amauronius Bourguignat, 1860

Synonyms
- Valvatomphalus angulatus B. Dybowski & Grochmalicki, 1925; Choanomphalus (Achoanomphalis) amauronius westerlundianus Lindholm, 1909

= Choanomphalus amauronius =

Species of gastropod

Choanomphalus amauronius is a species of freshwater air-breathing snail, an aquatic pulmonate gastropod mollusk in the family Planorbidae, the ram's horn snails, or planorbids.

== Subspecies ==
- Choanomphalus amauronius amauronius Bourguignat, 1860
- Choanomphalus amauronius angulatus (B. Dybowski & Grochmalicki, 1925)
- Choanomphalus amauronius westerlundianus Lindholm, 1909 The subspecific name westerlundianus is in honor of Swedish malacologist Carl Agardh Westerlund.

== Distribution ==
This species is found in Lake Baikal, Russia and in Angara River.

== Description ==
The width of the shell is 5–6 mm. The height of the shell is 4 mm.

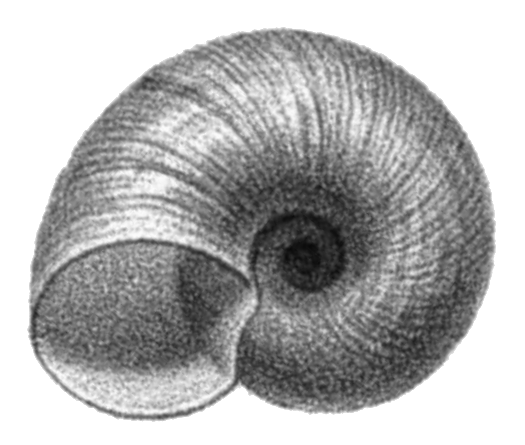
Apical view of the shell.

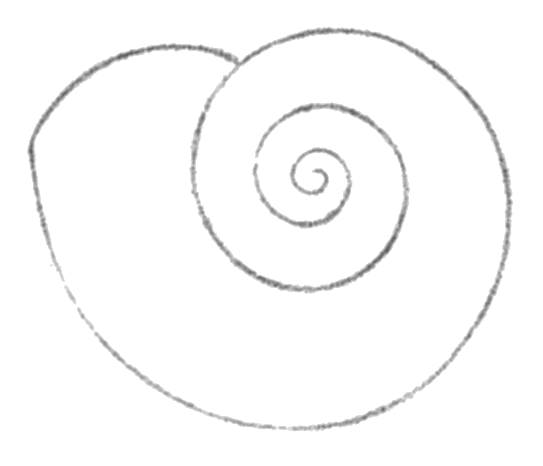
Umbilical view of the shell.
