= Trochorbis tadzhikistanica =

Scientific classification
- Kingdom: Animalia
- Phylum: Mollusca
- Class: Gastropoda
- Superorder: Hygrophila
- Family: Planorbidae
- Genus: Trochorbis
- Species: T. tadzhikistanica

Binomial name
- Trochorbis tadzhikistanica Izzatulaev, 1973

Species of gastropod

Trochorbis tadzhikistanica is a species of freshwater snail in the family Planorbidae that originates from Tajikistan.

== Taxonomy ==
Trochorbis tadzhikistanica was described by Z. Izzatulaev in 1973. Its type locality is from the shore of Goluboye Lake in the Tigrovaya Balka Nature Reserve in Tajikistan. The primary specimen used to describe the species (the holotype) is in the collections of the Zoological Museum in Saint Petersburg. Two additional specimens used in the description (the paratypes) can also be found here.

This species may be synonymous with Trochorbis anastasiae, as they look very similar, are found in the same place, and have not been studied well.
