= Glyptophysa moluccensis =

Conservation status
- Data Deficient (IUCN 3.1)

Scientific classification
- Kingdom: Animalia
- Phylum: Mollusca
- Class: Gastropoda
- Superorder: Hygrophila
- Family: Planorbidae
- Genus: Glyptophysa
- Species: G. moluccensis

Binomial name
- Glyptophysa moluccensis (Lesson, 1831)

Synonyms
- Isidora moluccensis (Lesson, 1831); superseded combination; Physa moluccensis Lesson, 1831; original combination; Physastra moluccensis (Lesson, 1831)

Species of mollusc

Glyptophysa moluccensis is a species of freshwater snail in the family Planorbidae. It is found in Southeast Asia on the islands of Timor, New Guinea, and the Maluku Islands.

== Taxonomy ==
Glyptophysa moluccensis was first described in 1831 by René Lesson from specimens collected in the Maluku Islands. It is not entirely clear if this species is valid. One type specimen is known; a syntype in the collections of the National Museum of Natural History in Paris.

== Description ==
The shell of Glyptophysa moluccensis is described as elongated and oval-shaped. It is somewhat dark in coloration. The central pillar (columella) is twisted. The shell is somewhat inflated.

== Distribution ==
Very little is known about the exact distribution, habitat, or ecology of Glyptophysa moluccensis. It may occur in freshwater lakes in central Timor, an island just north of Western Australia. One additional record exists from a marsh in New Guinea. The species was first discovered in the Maluku islands, but no exact location was given.
