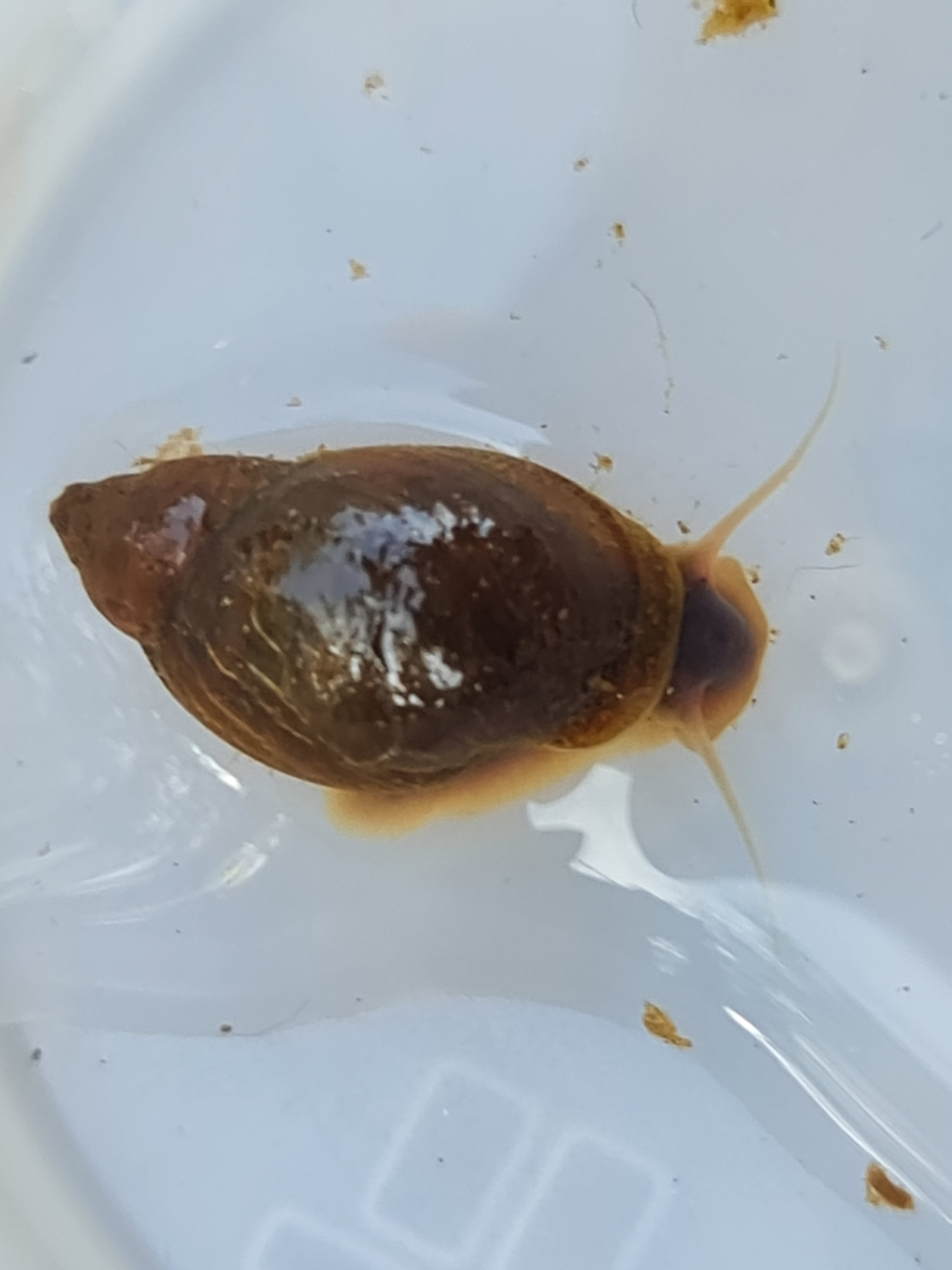
- In Perth, Australia

Conservation status
- Data Deficient (IUCN 3.1)

Scientific classification
- Kingdom: Animalia
- Phylum: Mollusca
- Class: Gastropoda
- Superorder: Hygrophila
- Family: Planorbidae
- Genus: Glyptophysa
- Species: G. georgiana

Binomial name
- Glyptophysa georgiana (Quoy & Gaimard, 1832)

Synonyms
- Glyptophysa (Glyptophysa) georgiana (Quoy & Gaimard, 1832); alternative representation; Isidora decorata Thiele, 1930; junior synonym; Physa australis Küster, 1844; junior synonym; Physa breviculmen E. A. Smith, 1882; junior synonym; Physa georgiana Quoy & Gaimard, 1832; original combination; Physa tenuilirata E. A. Smith, 1882; junior synonym

= Glyptophysa georgiana =

Glyptophysa georgiana Temporal range: Pleistocene–Present

Species of mollusc

Glyptophysa georgiana, also known as King George's freshwater snail or the south-western pouched snail, is a species of freshwater snail in the family Planorbidae. It can be found in fresh water in Western Australia, where it is somewhat common. Fossils of the species have also been recorded in the region, dating back to the Pleistocene.

== Taxonomy ==
Glyptophysa georgiana was described in 1832 by Jean René Constant Quoy and Joseph Paul Gaimard. The species was originally placed into the genus Physa, and given the name Physa georgiana. Specimens were first discovered in Western Australia at King George's Sound.

Several species are recorded as being identical to this one (i.e., synonymous), including Isidora decorata, Physa australis, Physa breviculmen, and Physa tenuilirata. Other sources consider different taxa to be synonyms, excluding the aforementioned. Additionally, one source previously considered G. georgiana to be synonymous with Glyptophysa gibbosa, though it was reinstated as a valid species due to unpublished molecular analyses. More work needs to be done to be certain of the placement of this taxon. This uncertainty is also given as the reason for the IUCN's 2011 classification of this species as data deficient. Only one type specimen is known from the species' original designation (Physa georgiana). It is a syntype (secondary specimen), and is located in the collections of the National Museum of Natural History in France. Three other syntypes are known, but are all from different taxonomic synonyms. One is located in the Museum für Naturkunde in Berlin, while the remaining specimens are in the Natural History Museum in London.

== Description ==
The sinistral (left-coiling), oblong, oval-shaped shell of Glyptophysa georgiana is yellow-brown in color, and about twice as long as it is wide. It has a very short spire, a structure formed from stacks of whorls. This species has a relatively smooth shell among the genus Glyptophysa, though not as smooth as the similar Physella acuta. The periostracum (outer layer of the shell) may be decorated with hairs or fine spiralling lines, though these characteristics are variable within populations.

This species may not be distinguishable from others in the genus based on shell characteristics alone, and must be accompanied by the location the specimen is found.

== Distribution and habitat ==
Species of Australian Glyptophysa may not be distinguishable by shell characteristics alone, with state borders proving useful for identification. Glyptophysa georgiana has been recorded from fresh water in coastal areas of southwestern Western Australia. Other sources include Tasmania as a valid location. The species is likely to make use of any body of fresh water as habitat, and is found in both fast (lotic) and slow-flowing (lentic) waters. It does not inhabit brackish or salt water. As of 2026, the IUCN lists this species as data deficient due to taxonomic confusion surrounding the genus. However, they comment that the species is likely relatively common, and may be considered least concern once the taxonomy is validated. Its habitat faces threats of degradation by agriculture, logging, and development, though no conservation actions are in place for this species.

This species has been recorded in the stomach contents of several fish species, including the minnows Galaxias occidentalis and Gambusia holbrooki, the perch Edelia vittata, and the nightfish (Bostockia porosa).

== Fossil record ==
Glyptophysa georgiana is known from fossil deposits dating as far back as the Pleistocene. Deposits containing this species are found in lakes, rivers, basins, and other locations in Western Australia around the cities of Perth, Balladonia, Gingin, Jandakot, and more.
