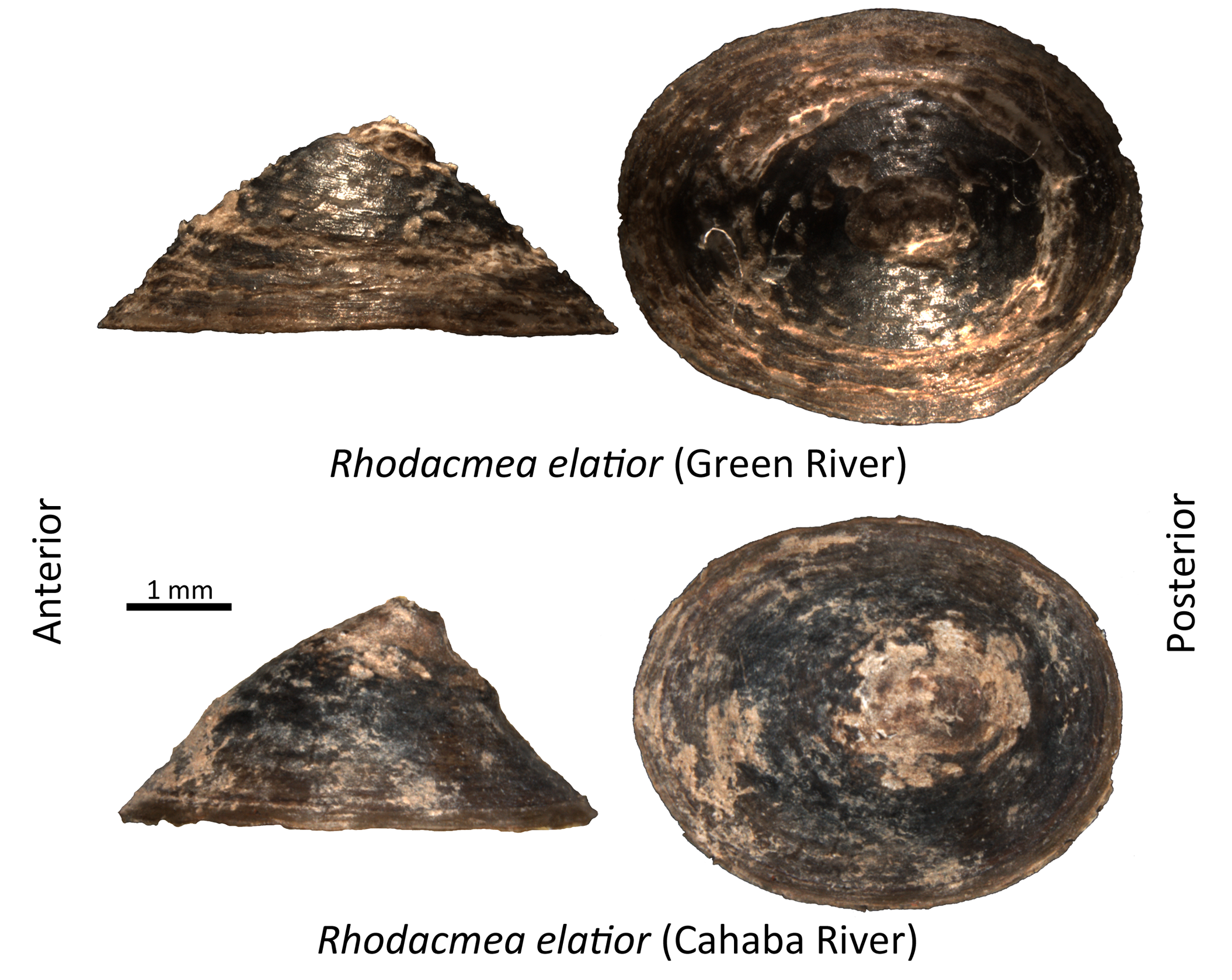
- Two views of two shells of the domed ancylid from the Green River and Cahaba River

Conservation status
- Vulnerable (IUCN 2.3)

- Critically Imperiled (NatureServe)

Scientific classification
- Kingdom: Animalia
- Phylum: Mollusca
- Class: Gastropoda
- Superorder: Hygrophila
- Family: Planorbidae
- Genus: Rhodacmea
- Species: R. elatior

Binomial name
- Rhodacmea elatior (Anthony, 1855)

Synonyms
- Rhodacme elatior

= Rhodacmea elatior =

Species of gastropod

Rhodacmea elatior, the domed ancylid, is a species of small freshwater snail or limpet, an aquatic gastropod mollusk in the family Planorbidae, the ram's horn snails and their allies.

== Distribution ==
This freshwater limpet is endemic to the United States.
