= Glyptophysa esau =

Conservation status
- Near Threatened (IUCN 3.1)

Scientific classification
- Kingdom: Animalia
- Phylum: Mollusca
- Class: Gastropoda
- Superorder: Hygrophila
- Family: Planorbidae
- Genus: Glyptophysa
- Species: G. esau

Binomial name
- Glyptophysa esau (B. Rensch, 1934)

Synonyms
- Glyptophysa (Glyptophysa) esau (B. Rensch, 1934); alternative representation; Physastra esau B. Rensch, 1934; superseded combination

Species of gastropod

Glyptophysa esau is a near-threatened species of freshwater snail in the family Planorbidae. It is found in the highlands of Sumatra in Indonesia, where it lives among aquatic vegetation in springs and ditches.

== Taxonomy ==
Glyptophysa esau was originally described as Physastra esau in 1934 by Bernhard Rensch. Specimens were collected near Balige, Sumatra. This species is hypothesized to be synonymous with Glyptophysa sumatrana, though it is considered valid by other sources.

Two type specimens are known from Rensch's original description. The holotype (primary specimen) and one paratype (secondary specimen) are both located at the Museum für Naturkunde in Germany.

== Distribution and habitat ==
Glyptophysa esau is found in mountainous regions on the island of Sumatra in Indonesia. The species is known only from three localities spanning across the island. It has been recorded from Balige in the north, the upper Musi River in the south, and Bukittinggi in the west. This snail is likely to occur beyond its known range however, occupying an estimated area of 5,000 km^{2} (1,900 mi^{2}) at maximum. Its habitat consists of fresh water, including both springs and ditches. It has been found to live with the aquatic plant Potamogeton wrightii, at an elevation of 920 m (3,020 ft). Several factors may threaten this habitat, including its degradation and conversion to farmland and gold quarries. These factors contribute to the IUCN's designation of this species as near-threatened. No plans to conserve the species are in place as of 2026.
