= Uncancylus foncki =

Scientific classification
- Kingdom: Animalia
- Phylum: Mollusca
- Class: Gastropoda
- Superorder: Hygrophila
- Family: Planorbidae
- Genus: Uncancylus
- Species: U. foncki

Binomial name
- Uncancylus foncki (Philippi, 1866)

Species of gastropod

Uncancylus foncki is a species of small, freshwater, air-breathing limpet, an aquatic pulmonate gastropod mollusc in the family Planorbidae, the ram's horn snails and their allies.

== Taxonomic notes ==
Some authors consider U. foncki a synonym of U. concentricus due to the similarity of their shell shapes.

== Distribution ==
U. foncki is endemic to Chile, where it occurs in lake Llanquihue and the Maullín river, which originates as the outflow of the lake, in the Llanquihue province. The type locality of the species is lake Llanquihue.

U. foncki is known only from museum specimens. Attempts to locate the species in its type locality and the surrounding areas, so as to confirm its identity, have failed.

== Description ==
U. foncki has a high, wide shell with an elliptical aperture. The apex is acute but not sharp, as in U. concentricus, located slightly to the right of the midline, dorsally flattened and bent to the right but not reaching the edge of the shell. The protoconch exhibits irregularly arranged tenuous punctuations. The teleoconch exhibits fine growth lines, while radial lines and periostracal hair are absent.

== See also ==
- List of non-marine molluscs of Chile
