= Glyptophysa cyphus =

Conservation status
- Endangered (IUCN 3.1)

Scientific classification
- Kingdom: Animalia
- Phylum: Mollusca
- Class: Gastropoda
- Superorder: Hygrophila
- Family: Planorbidae
- Genus: Glyptophysa
- Species: G. cyphus

Binomial name
- Glyptophysa cyphus (van Benthem Jutting, 1963)

Synonyms
- Physastra cyphus; original combination

Species of mollusc

Glyptophysa cyphus is a species of endangered freshwater snail in the family Planorbidae. It is only found in two lakes within Western New Guinea in Indonesia.

== Taxonomy ==
Glyptophysa cyphus was originally described in 1963 by W. S. S. van Benthem Jutting from 17 specimens collected in Western New Guinea in Indonesia.

Three type specimens are known, all of which are paratypes from the species' original description, and all of which are located in the Netherlands. Two of these are in the collections of the Naturalis Biodiversity Center in Leiden, while the remaining specimen is in the Zoological Museum of Amsterdam.

== Distribution and habitat ==
Glyptophysa cyphus is only known to inhabit two lakes in Western New Guinea; Lake Tigi and Lake Paniai. This habitat has a total area of 390 km^{2} (150 mi^{2}), of which only 296 km^{2} (114 mi^{2}) may be used by the snail. It is considered to be endangered within this range, as populations are likely declining as a result of predation by several invasive species, including two species of tilapia, the common carp, and the crayfish Cherax. Although development occurs around the snail's habitat, wastewater and agricultural effluents are unlikely to contribute to their decline.
