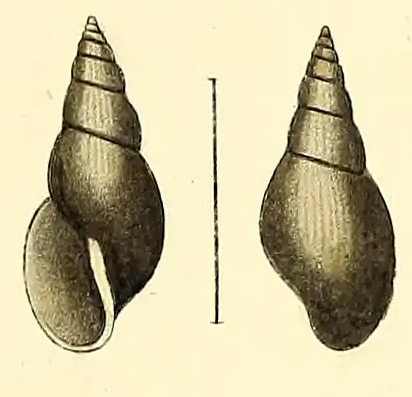
- Illustration from its original description

Conservation status
- Least Concern (IUCN 3.1)

Scientific classification
- Kingdom: Animalia
- Phylum: Mollusca
- Class: Gastropoda
- Superorder: Hygrophila
- Family: Planorbidae
- Genus: Glyptophysa
- Species: G. albertisi

Binomial name
- Glyptophysa albertisi (Clessin, 1886)

Synonyms
- Glyptophysa (Glyptophysa) albertisi (Clessin, 1886); alternative representation; Physa albertisi Clessin, 1886; original combination; Physastra albertisi (Clessin, 1886); superseded combination

= Glyptophysa albertisi =

Species of gastropod

Glyptophysa albertisi is a somewhat large species of freshwater snail in the family Planorbidae. It is endemic to Papua New Guinea, but is only known from two records.

== Taxonomy ==
Glyptophysa albertisi was discovered in Papua New Guinea by Stefan Clessin in 1886, who placed the new species into the genus Physa, giving it the name Physa albertisi. In 1937, the species was moved to the genus Physastra, and in 1988, the genus Physastra was merged with Glyptophysa, giving the species the name Glyptophysa albertisi.

There are two type specimens known, a lectotype and a paralectotype, both located at the Museum für Naturkunde in Berlin.

== Description ==
Glyptophysa albertisi has a conical shell that measures 31 mm (1.2 in) in length and 8.7 mm (0.34 in) in diameter. The shell makes eight complete revolutions (whorls). The final (body) whorl is relatively large. The sutures in between the whorls are somewhat sunken into the shell.

== Distribution and habitat ==
Glyptophysa albertisi is endemic to Papua New Guinea, where it is known from only two occurrences. Clessin described it from "Najabui", but the exact location is not known. The only other known sighting of this species was in 1963, from the Chimbu highlands. The IUCN lists this species as Least Concern because the 1963 observation was recorded from a remote area with no threats.

This species lives in fresh water, but little else is known about it.
