= Gundlachia =

Gundlachia can refer to:

- Gundlachia (gastropod), a genus of freshwater snails in the family Planorbidae
- Gundlachia (plant), a genus of plants in the family Asteraceae
