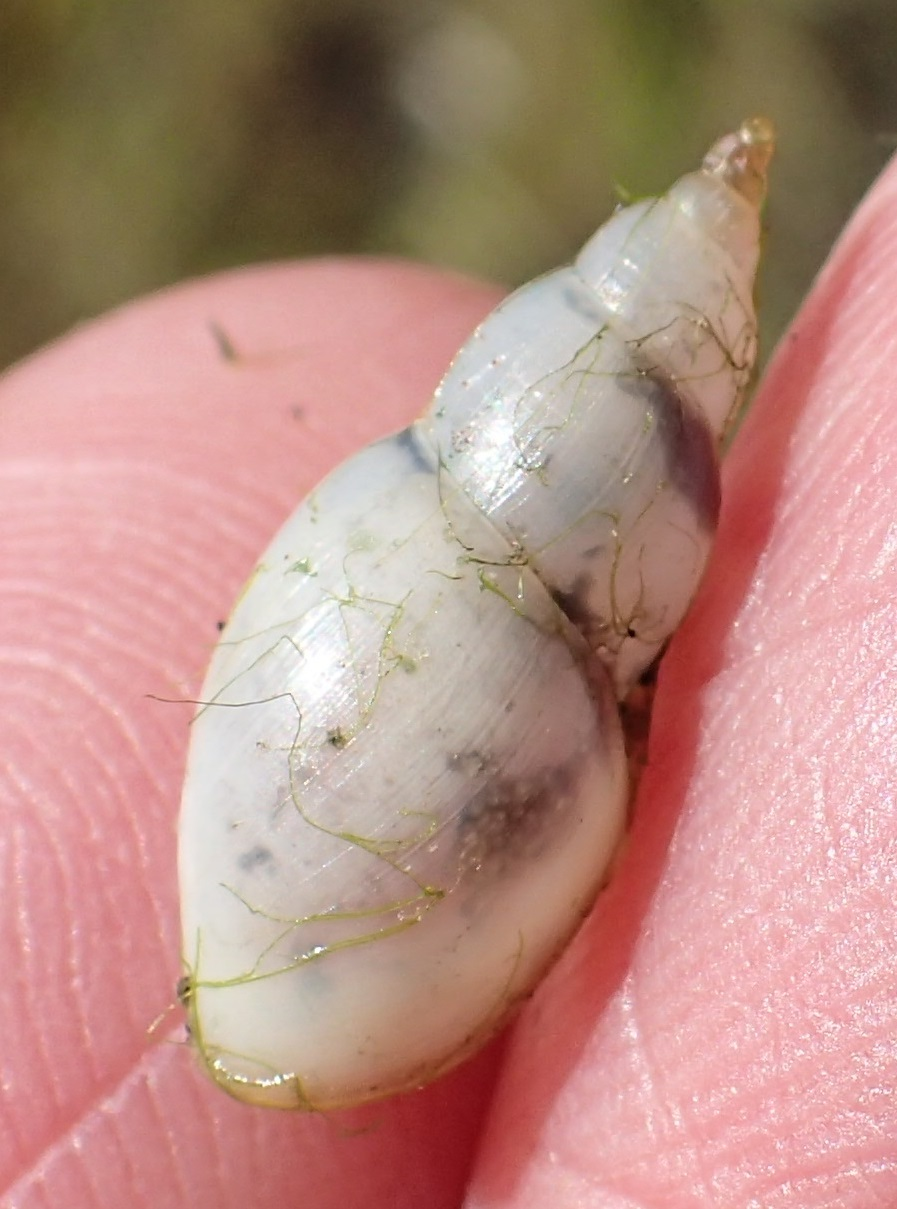
- Glyptophysa novahollandica

Scientific classification
- Kingdom: Animalia
- Phylum: Mollusca
- Class: Gastropoda
- Superorder: Hygrophila
- Family: Planorbidae
- Subfamily: Miratestinae
- Genus: Glyptophysa; Crosse, 1872

Type species
- Physa petiti Crosse, 1872

Synonyms
- Glyptamoda Iredale, 1943; junior synonym; Lenameria Iredale, 1943; junior synonym; Oppletora Iredale, 1943; superseded rank; Physa (Physastra) Tapparone Canefri; junior synonym; Physastra Tapparone Canefri, 1883; junior synonym; Tasmadora Iredale, 1943

= Glyptophysa =

Genus of gastropods

Glyptophysa is a genus of medium-sized sinistral (left-handed) air-breathing freshwater snails, aquatic pulmonate gastropod mollusks in the family of Planorbidae.

== Description ==
Shells are medium-sized, smooth and globose to elongate. Shells of Glyptophysa are always sinistral. "Members of the genus possess a twist or fold on the columella, a feature lacking in Isidorella and Physella. Whorls round or carinate."

== Distribution ==
Australia, New Guinea, New Caledonia, New Zealand, Moluccas, Philippines, Sumatra, islands of South Pacific east to Tahiti, and Malaysia (introduced).

== Habitat and ecology ==
Often found on water weeds, submerged wood, rocks, gravel and sand in ponds, billabongs, swamps, and sluggish streams and rivers(both still and flowing). Occasionally on mud. "Feeds on algae and detritus." Glyptophysa snails are grazers-scrapers.

== Species ==
Species in this genus include:

- Glyptophysa albertisi (Clessin, 1886)
- Glyptophysa aliciae (Reeve, 1862)
- Glyptophysa caledonica (Morelet, 1857)
- Glyptophysa cyphus (van Benthem Jutting, 1963)
- Glyptophysa doopi (Prashad, 1921)
- Glyptophysa esau (B. Rensch, 1934)
- Glyptophysa fulgata (van Benthem Jutting, 1963)
- Glyptophysa georgiana (Quoy & Gaimard, 1832) – King George's Freshwater Snail
- Glyptophysa hispida (Morelet, 1857)
- Glyptophysa jukesii (H. Adams, 1861)
- Glyptophysa keysseri (Kobelt, 1913)
- Glyptophysa moluccensis (R. P. Lesson, 1831)
- Glyptophysa nasuta (Morelet, 1857)
- Glyptophysa novahollandica (Bowdich, 1822)
- Glyptophysa novoguineae (Clessin, 1886)
- Glyptophysa obtusa (Morelet, 1857)
- Glyptophysa oconnori (Cumber, 1941)
- Glyptophysa ovalina (E. von Martens, 1897)
- Glyptophysa petiti (Crosse 1872) – type species
- †Glyptophysa rodingae (McMichael, 1968)
- †Glyptophysa sinensis L. -S. Huang, 1987
- Glyptophysa proteus (Sowerby, 1873) – tentatively placed here
- Glyptophysa stagnalis (E. von Martens, 1897)
- Glyptophysa sumatrana (E. von Martens, 1897)
- Glyptophysa toxopei (van Benthem Jutting, 1963)
- Glyptophysa vandiemenensis (G. B. Sowerby II, 1873)
- Glyptophysa variabilis (J. E. Gray, 1843)
- Glyptophysa vestita (Tapparone Canefri, 1883)
- Glyptophysa wilhelminae (van Benthem Jutting, 1963)

=== Species brought into synonymy ===
- Glyptophysa badia (A. Adams & Angas, 1864); accepted as G. novahollandica (Bowdich, 1822)
- †Glyptophysa carinata Youluo, 1978; unaccepted
- Glyptophysa gibbosa (A. A. Gould, 1846); accepted as G. novahollandica. (Bowdich, 1822) (Some sources accept this species as valid).
- †Glyptophysa micra Yuoluo, 1978; unaccepted
- Glyptophysa novaehollandica; accepted as G. novahollandica (Bowdich, 1822) (misspelling)
- Glyptophysa pyramidata (G. B. Sowerby II, 1873); accepted as G. gibbosa (A. A. Gould, 1847)
- Glyptophysa rezvoji Lindholm, 1929; accepted as Culmenella rezvoji (Lindholm, 1929)

Subgenera

- Glyptophysa (Glyptophysa) Crosse, 1872; alternative representation
- Glyptophysa (Oppletora) Iredale, 1943; alternative representation
