= Uncancylus =

Scientific classification
- Kingdom: Animalia
- Phylum: Mollusca
- Class: Gastropoda
- Superorder: Hygrophila
- Family: Planorbidae
- Tribe: Ancylini
- Genus: Uncancylus; Pilsbry, 1913

Species
- See text

Genus of gastropods

Uncancylus bonariensis

Uncancylus is a genus of small, freshwater, air-breathing limpets, aquatic pulmonate gastropod molluscs in the family Planorbidae, the ram's horn snails and their allies.

== Anatomy ==
These animals have a pallial lung, as do all pulmonate snails, but they also have a false gill or "pseudobranch" which can serve perfectly well as a gill when they are unable to reach the surface for air.

== Species ==
Species within the genus Uncancylus include:

- Uncancylus concentricus (d'Orbigny, 1835)
- Uncancylus crequi (Bavay, 1904)
- Uncancylus foncki (Philippi, 1866)
- Uncancylus patagonicus (Biese, 1948)
