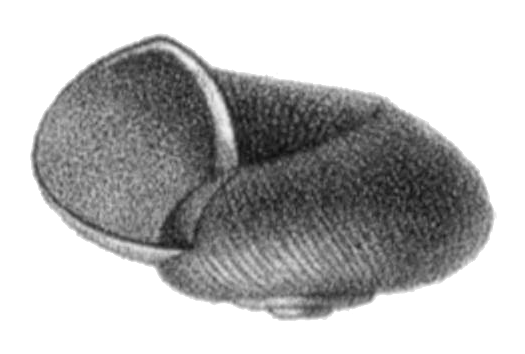
- An apertural view of the shell of Choanomphalus maacki

Scientific classification
- Kingdom: Animalia
- Phylum: Mollusca
- Class: Gastropoda
- Superorder: Hygrophila
- Family: Planorbidae
- Subfamily: Planorbinae
- Tribe: Planorbini
- Genus: Choanomphalus; Gerstfeldt, 1859

Type species
- Choanomphalus maacki Gerstfeldt, 1859

= Choanomphalus =

Genus of molluscs

Choanomphalus is a genus of air-breathing freshwater snails, aquatic pulmonate gastropod mollusks in the family Planorbidae, the ram's horn snails, or planorbids. All species in this genus have sinistral or left-coiling shells.

== Species ==
Species within the genus Choanomphalus include:

- Choanomphalus amauronius Bourguignat, 1860
  - Choanomphalus amauronius angulatus (B. Dybowski & Grochmalicki, 1925)
  - Choanomphalus amauronius westerlundianus Lindholm, 1909
- Choanomphalus annuliformis Kozhov, 1936
- Choanomphalus anomphalus W. Dybowski, 1901
- Choanomphalus aorus Bourguignat, 1860
- Choanomphalus baicalensis
- Choanomphalus bathybius Beckman & Starobogatov, 1975
  - Choanomphalus bathybius meridianus Beckman & Starobogatov, 1975
- Choanomphalus cryptomphalus W. Dybowski, 1901
- Choanomphalus eurystomus Lindholm, 1909
- Choanomphalus gerstfeldtianus Lindholm, 1909
- Choanomphalus grachevi Sitnikova & Röpstorf, 1999
- Choanomphalus huzhirensis Beckman & Starobogatov, 1975
- Choanomphalus hyaliniiformis Moskvicheva & Dworiadkin, 1980
- Choanomphalus incertus Lindholm, 1909
  - Choanomphalus incertus mesospiralis B. Dybowski & Grochmalicki, 1925
- Choanomphalus korotnevi Lindholm, 1909
- Choanomphalus kozhovi Beckman & Starobogatov, 1975
- Choanomphalus lindholmi Beckman & Starobogatov, 1975
- Choanomphalus maacki Gerstfeldt, 1859 - type species
  - Choanomphalus maacki andrussowianus (Lindholm, 1909)
  - Choanomphalus maacki elatior Lindholm, 1909
- Choanomphalus microtrochus Lindholm, 1909
- Choanomphalus mongolicus
- Choanomphalus okhoticus Prozorova & Starobogatov, 1997
- Choanomphalus omphalotus W. Dybowski, 1901
- Choanomphalus parvus Kozhov, 1936
- Choanomphalus patulaeformis Lindholm, 1909
- Choanomphalus planorbiformis Beckman & Starobogatov, 1975
- Choanomphalus pygmaeus Lindholm, 1909
- Choanomphalus schrencki or Choanomphalus schrenkii W. Dybowski, 1875
- Choanomphalus valvatoides W. Dybowski, 1875

Synonyms:

- Choanomphalus riparius (Westerlund, 1865) is a synonym of Gyraulus riparius
- Choanomphalus rossmaessleri (Auerswald in A. Schmidt, 1851) is a synonym of Gyraulus rossmaessleri
