= Planorbula =

Scientific classification
- Domain: Eukaryota
- Kingdom: Animalia
- Phylum: Mollusca
- Class: Gastropoda
- Superorder: Hygrophila
- Family: Planorbidae
- Subfamily: Planorbinae
- Tribe: Helisomatini
- Genus: Planorbula; Haldeman, 1840

Genus of freshwater snails

Planorbula is a genus of gastropods belonging to the family Planorbidae.

The species of this genus are found in Northern America and Africa.

Species:

- Planorbula armigera (Say, 1821)
- Planorbula campestris (Dawson, 1875)
- Planorbula durhami (Hanna & Hertlein, 1938)
- Planorbula mojavensis (Hannibal, 1912)
- Planorbula nebrascensis Leonard, 1948
- Planorbula powelli Pierce, 1993
