= Miratesta =

Scientific classification
- Kingdom: Animalia
- Phylum: Mollusca
- Class: Gastropoda
- Superorder: Hygrophila
- Family: Planorbidae
- Genus: Miratesta; P. Sarasin & F. Sarasin, 1897

Genus of gastropods

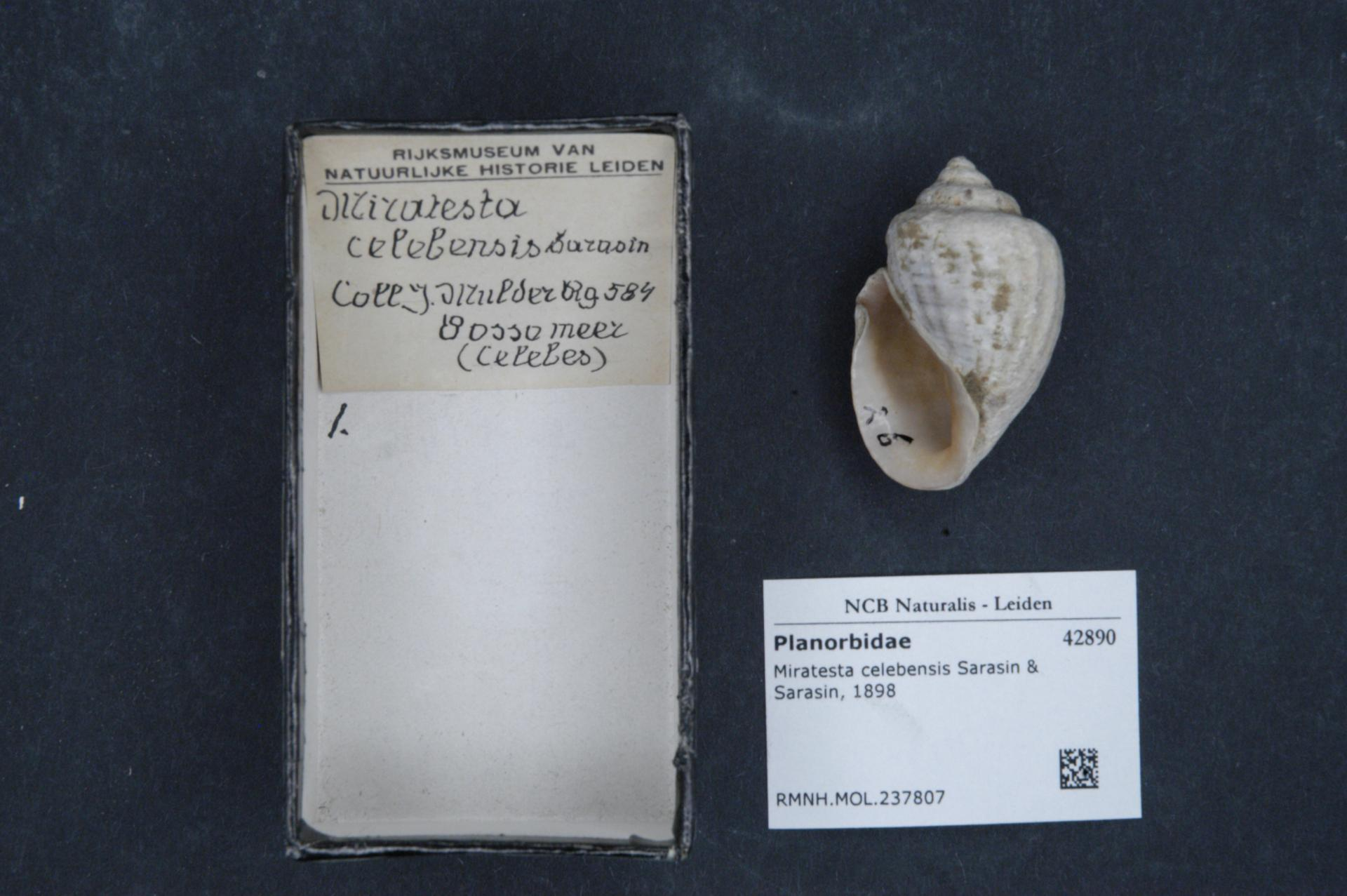

Miratesta is a genus of freshwater air-breathing snails, aquatic pulmonate gastropod mollusks in the family Planorbidae, the ram's horn snails, or planorbids. All species in this genus have sinistral or left-coiling shells.

Miratesta is the type genus of the tribe Miratestini.

== Species ==
Species within the genus Miratesta include:

- Miratesta celebensis P. & F. Sarasin, 1898
