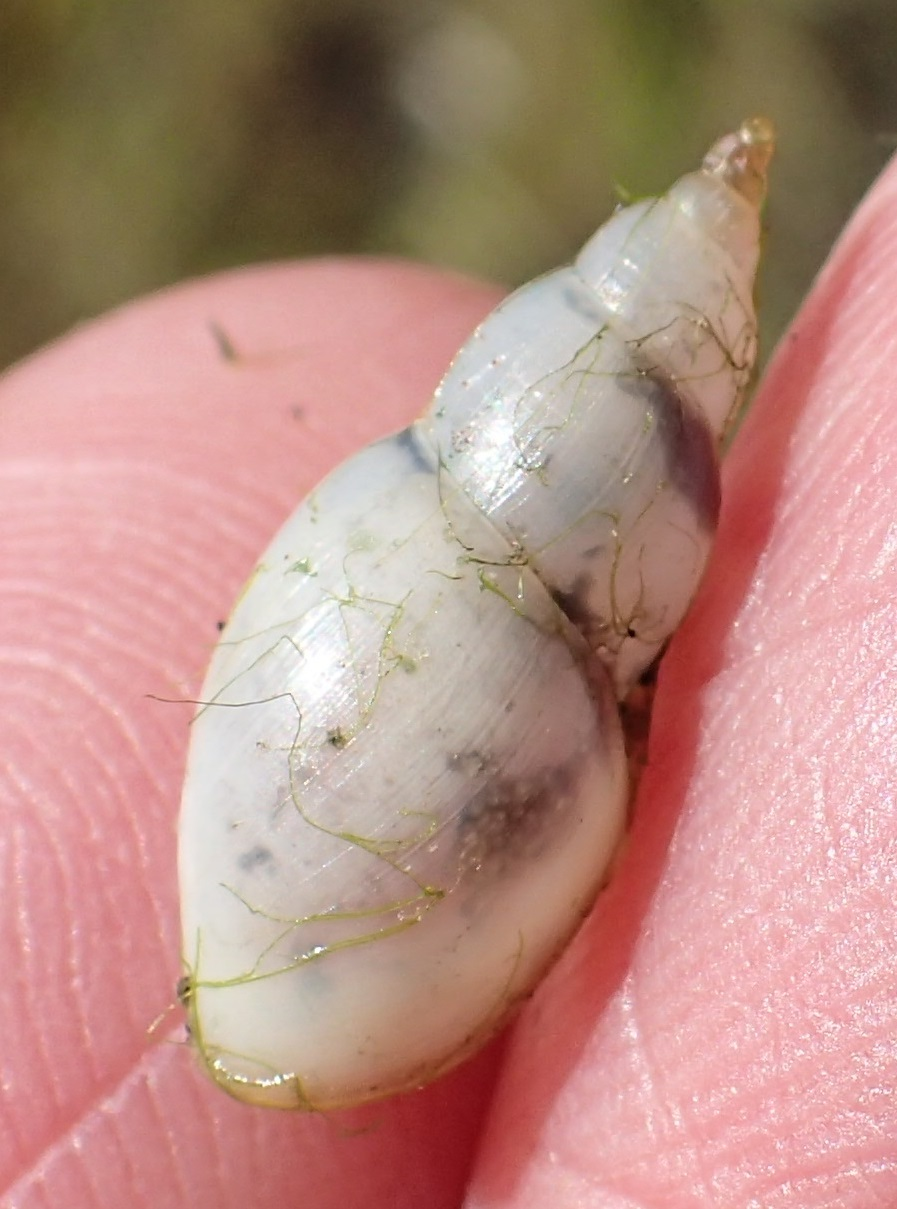

Scientific classification
- Kingdom: Animalia
- Phylum: Mollusca
- Class: Gastropoda
- Superorder: Hygrophila
- Family: Planorbidae
- Genus: Glyptophysa
- Species: G. novahollandica

Binomial name
- Glyptophysa novahollandica (Bowdich, 1822)

Synonyms
- Physa novaehollandica Bowdich, 1822 (original combination); Physa novaehollandiae Lesson, 1831; Physa novaehollandiae Gray, 1833; Physa ludwigii Küster, 1844; Physa gibbosa Gould, 1846; Physa pectorosa Conrad, 1850; Physa australiana Conrad, 1850; Physa concinna Adams and Angas 1864; Physa olivacea Adams and Angas 1864; Physa badia Adams and Angas 1864; Physa aciculata Sowerby, 1873; Physa dispar Sowerby, 1873; Physa pyramidata Sowerby, 1873; Physa tenuistriata Sowerby, 1873; Physa subundata Sowerby, 1873; Aplexa adamsiana Tapparone-Canefri 1874; Physa duplicata G. B. Sowerby, 1874; Physa aperta Sowerby, 1874; Physa nitida Sowerby, 1874; Physa attenuata Sowerby, 1874; Physa pinguis Sowerby, 1874; Physa brunniensis Sowerby, 1874; Physa eburnea Sowerby, 1874; Physa mamillata Sowerby, 1874; Physa nitida Sowerby, 1874; Physa texturata Sowerby, 1874; Physa bullata Sowerby, 1874; Physa kershawi Tenison-Woods, 1878; Physa huonensis Tenison-Woods, 1876; Physa legrandi Tenison-Woods, 1876; Physa tasmanica Tenison-Woods, 1876; Physa huonicola Tenison-Woods, 1876; Physa tasmanicola Tenison-Woods, 1876; Physa ciliata Tenison-Woods, 1876; Physa yarraensis Tenison-Woods, 1878; Physa diemenensis Johnston, 1879; Physa fumiformis Nelson and Taylor 1879; Physa beddomei Nelson and Taylor 1879; Physa brisbanica Nelson and Taylor 1879; Aplexa turrita Tate, 1881; Physa exarata Smith, 1882; Physa gracilenta Smith, 1882; Physa etheridgei Smith, 1882; Physa queenslandica Smith, 1882; Physa lessoni Smith, 1882; Physa grayi Smith, 1882; Physa smithi Clessin, 1885; Physa kreffti Clessin, 1886; Physa multispirata Clessin, 1886; Physa conica Clessin, 1886; Physa lincolnensis Clessin, 1886; Physa waterhousei Clessin, 1886; Physa producta Smith, 1882; Physa tortuosa Clessin, 1886; Physa arachnoidea Tenison-Woods, 1878; Isidora gibbosa brevispira Odhner, 1917; Bullinus tenuistriatus confluens Hedley, 1917; Amerianna subacuta Cotton and Beasley, 1941; Glyptamoda ellea Iredale, 1943; Tasmadora sorellensis Cotton, 1943; Glyptamoda orta Iredale, 1944; Lenameria calda Iredale, 1944; Lenameria digressa Iredale, 1944; Lenameria epicropa Iredale, 1944; Lenameria formalis Iredale, 1944; Lenameria placata Iredale, 1944; Lenameria pretena Iredale, 1944; Lenameria renola Iredale, 1943; Mutalena modica Iredale, 1944; Mutalena raperta Iredale, 1944

= Glyptophysa novahollandica =

Species of gastropod

Glyptophysa novahollandica is a freshwater species of gastropod mollusk in the family Planorbidae.

== Description ==
The length of an adult shell may exceed 30 mm. The shells of adult G. novahollandica are very variable, often have relatively smooth shells. Some specimens or populations may also have periostracal hairs and spirals present.

== Distribution ==
This species occurs in all states and territories of Australia, including Tasmania. Specimens from Papua New Guinea and East Timor may also prove to be this species.
