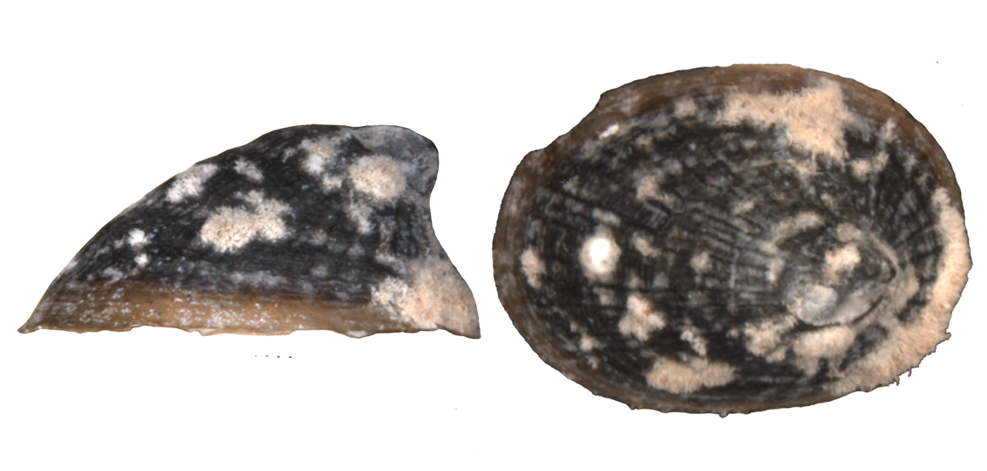
- Two views of a shell of Rhodacmea filosa

Scientific classification
- Kingdom: Animalia
- Phylum: Mollusca
- Class: Gastropoda
- Superorder: Hygrophila
- Family: Planorbidae
- Genus: Rhodacmea; Walker, 1917

Diversity
- 3 species

= Rhodacmea =

Genus of gastropods

Rhodacmea is a genus of small freshwater snails or limpets, aquatic gastropod mollusks in the family Planorbidae, the ram's horn snails and their allies.

Rhodacmea is the type genus of the subfamily Rhodacmeinae.

== Anatomy ==
These animals have a pallial lung, as do all pulmonate snails, but they also have a false gill or "pseudobranch". This serves as a gill, which is necessary as, in their non-tidal habitat, these limpets never reach the surface for air.

== Species ==
Species in the genus Rhodacmea include:

- Rhodacmea elatior (Anthony, 1855) – domed ancylid
- Rhodacmea filosa (Conrad, 1834) – wicker ancylid, type species
- Rhodacmea hinkleyi (Walker, 1908)
