= Menetus =

Scientific classification
- Kingdom: Animalia
- Phylum: Mollusca
- Class: Gastropoda
- Superorder: Hygrophila
- Family: Planorbidae
- Genus: Menetus; H. Adams & A. Adams, 1855

Genus of gastropods

Menetus is a North American genus of freshwater snails, aquatic pulmonate gastropod mollusks in the family Planorbidae, the ramshorn snails.

== Species ==
Species within this genus include:

subgenus Micromenetus F. C. Baker, 1945

- Menetus dilatatus (Gould, 1841) - the type species

subgenus ?

- Menetus alabamensis
- Menetus brogniartianus
- Menetus floridensis
- Menetus opercularis
- Menetus portlandensis
- Menetus sampsoni
