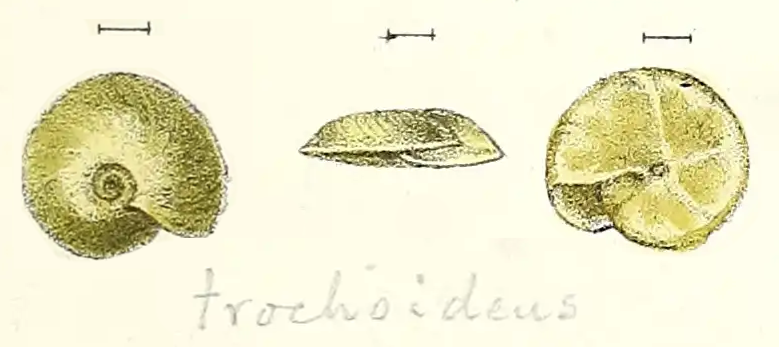

Scientific classification
- Kingdom: Animalia
- Phylum: Mollusca
- Class: Gastropoda
- Superorder: Hygrophila
- Family: Planorbidae
- Genus: Trochorbis; W. H. Benson, 1855

Type species
- Planorbis trochoideus W.H. Benson, 1836

Synonyms
- Planorbis (Trochorbis) W. H. Benson, 1855; Segmentina (Trochorbis) W. H. Benson, 1855; superseded rank

= Trochorbis =

Genus of gastropods

Trochorbis is a genus of freshwater snails in the family Planorbidae. The type species is Trochorbis trochoideus.

== Taxonomy ==
This genus was originally described as a subgenus of Planorbis, named Planorbis (Trochorbis), by William Henry Benson in 1855. Later authors considered Trochorbis to be synonymous with the genus Segmentina, sometimes displaying it as the subgenus Planorbis (Segmentina). In 1945, Frank C. Baker restated the group as it currently appears: its own independent genus within the subfamily Segmentininae (now tribe Segmentinini). The type species is Trochorbis trochoideus.

The genus is hypothesized to be closely related to the genus Polypylis due to similar shell characteristics.

== Description ==
Species of Trochorbis are distinguished by a disc-shaped shell where the final (body) whorl covers most of the other whorls.

== Species ==
Species within this genus include:

- Trochorbis tadzhikistanica Izzatullaev, 1973
- Trochorbis trochoideus (W. H. Benson, 1836)

One species remains uncertain (incertae sedis):

- Trochorbis anastasiae Izzatullaev, 1973
