= Leichhardtia (gastropod) =

Scientific classification
- Kingdom: Animalia
- Phylum: Mollusca
- Class: Gastropoda
- Superorder: Hygrophila
- Family: Planorbidae
- Subfamily: Miratestinae
- Genus: Leichhardtia; Walker, 1988

Genus of gastropods

Leichhardtia is a genus of air-breathing freshwater snails, aquatic pulmonate gastropod mollusks in the family Planorbidae, the ram's horn snails.

All species within this genus and this family have sinistral shells.

== Distribution ==
This genus is endemic to, and restricted to, northern Australia.

== Species ==
Species within this genus include:

- Leichhardtia sisurnius

== See also ==
- Similar genus is Kessneria.
