= Uncancylus concentricus =

Conservation status
- Least Concern (IUCN 3.1)

Scientific classification
- Kingdom: Animalia
- Phylum: Mollusca
- Class: Gastropoda
- Superorder: Hygrophila
- Family: Planorbidae
- Genus: Uncancylus
- Species: U. concentricus

Binomial name
- Uncancylus concentricus (d'Orbigny, 1835)

Synonyms
- Gundlachia concentrica d'Orbigny, 1835; Uncancylus calverti Pilsbry, 1913; Hebetancylus culicoides Simone, 2006

Species of gastropod

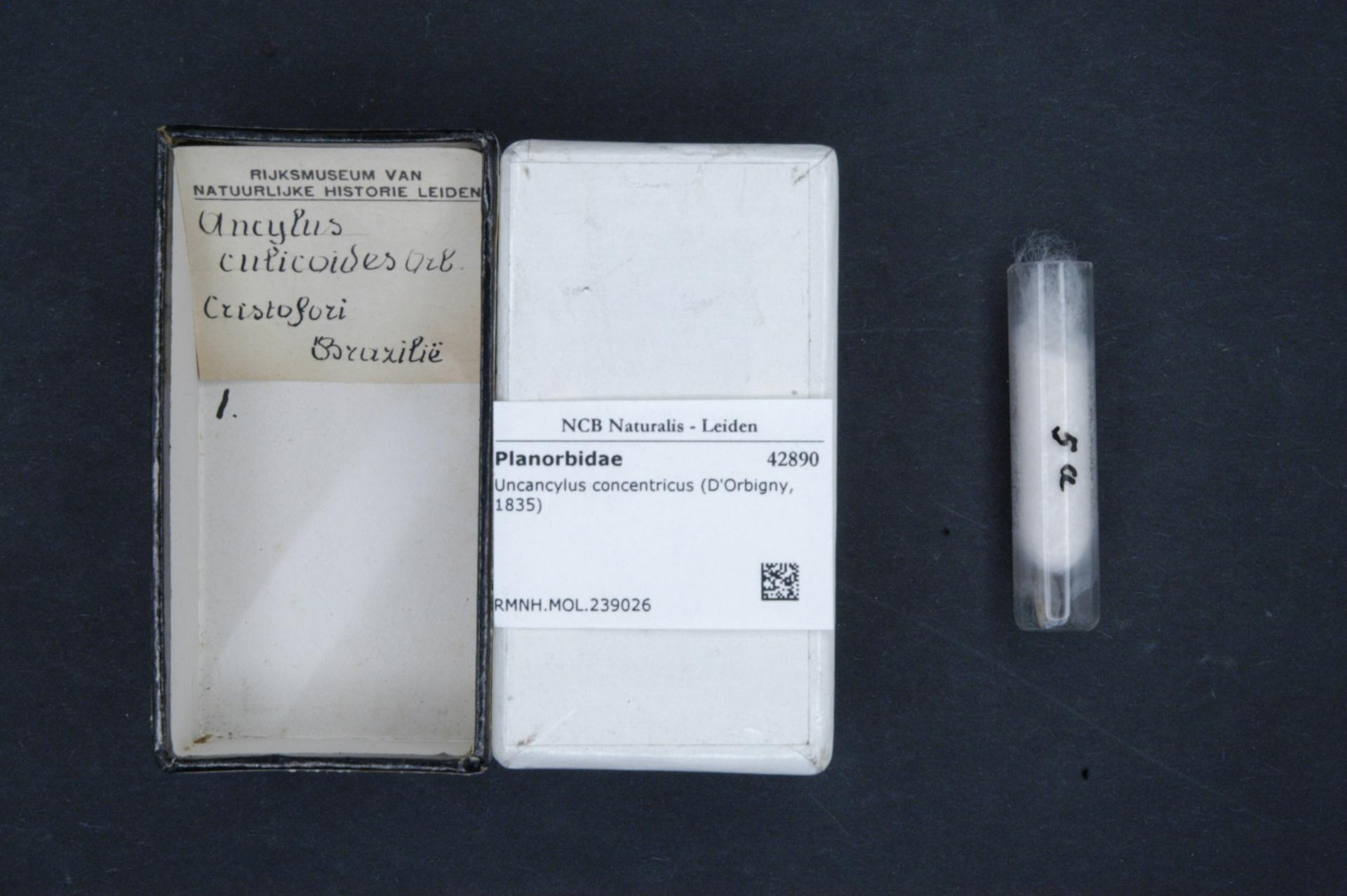

Uncancylus concentricus is a species of small, freshwater, air-breathing limpet, an aquatic pulmonate gastropod mollusc in the family Planorbidae, the ram's horn snails and their allies.

== Distribution ==
U. concentricus occurs in Costa Rica, Puerto Rico, Colombia, Argentina, Chile, Brazil, Paraguay and Uruguay. The species' type locality, according to d'Orbigny (1835), is close to Montevideo, near the island Isla de Ratas, at the mouth of the Río de la Plata.

== Description ==
U. concentricus has a high, thin, transparent shell, with growth lines and radial ribs, which may in certain cases appear somewhat fuzzy, especially when it inhabits torrential environments. The apex is acute, quite recurved, moved back from the midpoint and flexed on the right side. The aperture is oval, broad, with somewhat wavy edges. The colour is typically light brown to tawny. The radula has a central bicuspid tooth, with the left cusp predominating and hinting at the birth of two others, one on each side. The lateral tooth has three rather noticeable cusps and a fourth, very small outer cusp.

The species is hermaphrodite; the genitalia are a key diagnostic character at the species level. The ovotestis contains around 25 follicles and the seminal vesicle is located in the middle portion of the ovisperm duct. The prostate usually has five elongated follicles.

== Habitat and ecology ==
U. concentricus inhabits shady places on rocks or leaves of aquatic plants, leaves in the process of decomposition, including submerged tree trunks. It occurs in springs, mountainous streams, and medium-sized rivers. It may also be found in stagnant waters, lakes or ponds where a surface that allows adhesion exists; no specimens were observed on silty or sandy substrates. Dos Santos (2003) has associated the species with environments with little current, not polluted, with meso- to oligotrophic features.

U. concentricus associates with the roots of the common Water Hyacinth (Eichhornia crassipes), and can withstand periods of low water in lentic habitats. It also associates with Chaetogaster sp., Carchesium sp. (Ciliophora) and green hydra and algae that grow densely on its shell.

Regarding parasitism, U. concentricus has been reported to act as the intermediate host of several families of Trematoda (Digenea).
