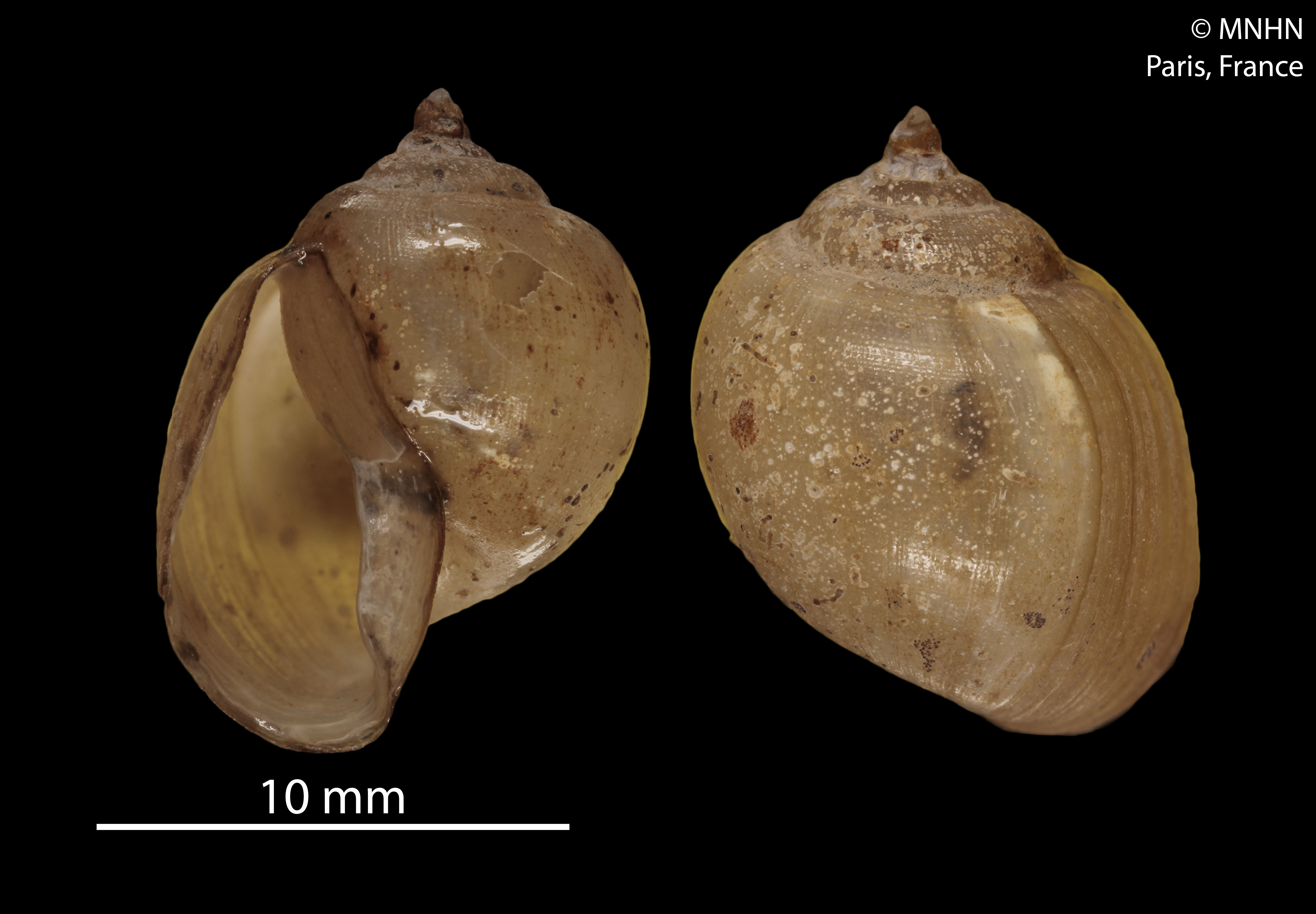
- Shell of Kessneria papillosa (paratype at MNHN, Paris)

Scientific classification
- Kingdom: Animalia
- Phylum: Mollusca
- Class: Gastropoda
- Superorder: Hygrophila
- Superfamily: Lymnaeoidea
- Family: Planorbidae
- Subfamily: Miratestinae
- Genus: Kessneria; Walker & Ponder, 2001

Type species
- Kessneria papillosa J. C. Walker & Ponder, 2001

= Kessneria =

Genus of gastropods

Kessneria is a genus of air-breathing freshwater snails, aquatic pulmonate gastropod mollusks in the family Planorbidae, the ram's horn snails.

All species within family Planorbidae have sinistral shells.

== Distribution ==
This genus is endemic to, and restricted to, northern Australia.

== Species ==
Species within this genus include:

- Kessneria papillosa Walker & Ponder, 2001
