= Billabong Sanctuary =

- Interactive map of Billabong Sanctuary
- 19.3747°S 146.9058°E
- Location: Nome, North Queensland, Australia
- Land area: 11 ha (27 acres)
- No. of species: 100+
- Website: www.billabongsanctuary.com.au

The Billabong Sanctuary is an 11-hectare (27-acre) wildlife sanctuary in Nome, 17 kilometres (11 mi) south of Townsville, North Queensland, Australia.

== Animals ==
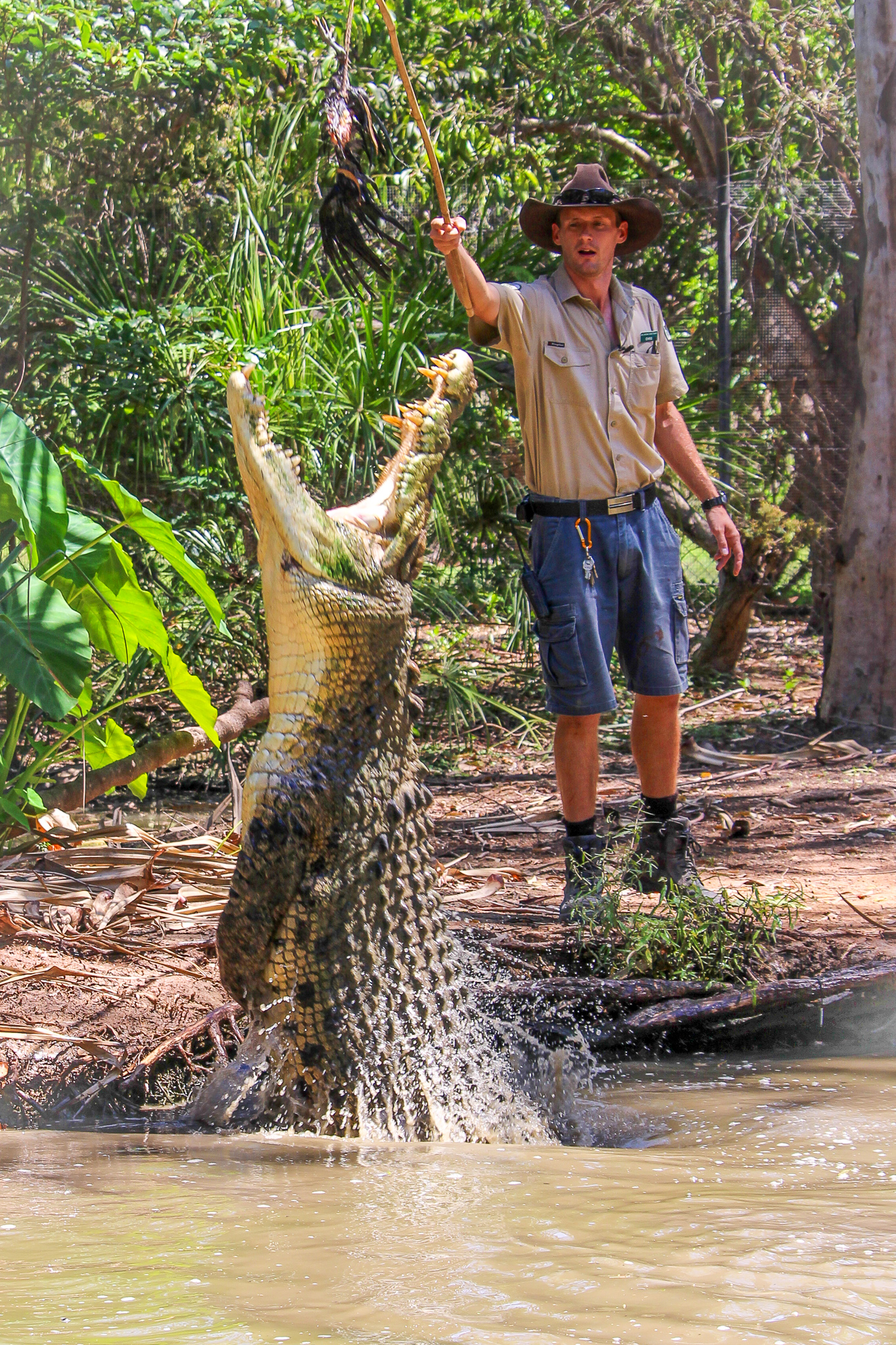
Crocodile feeding

The sanctuary is a permanent home to a large number of native Australian animals such as kangaroos, wallabies, tree-kangaroos, pademelons, koalas, wombats, echidnas, dingos, crocodiles, goannas, snakes, emus, cassowaries, cockatoos; as well as several exotic species such as meerkats, American alligators and New Guinea crocodiles. The natural billabong (lake) at the center of the sanctuary is host to many visiting animals, some of which will breed and raise their young at the sanctuary. Visitors to the sanctuary can take guided or self-guided tours through the 11-hectare (27-acre) natural tropical bush.

== Breeding programs ==
Breeding programs at the sanctuary include the southern cassowary, estuarine crocodile, koala, eclectus parrot, black-headed python, and (since September 2016) greater bilby.

== Awards ==
The Billabong Sanctuary has won several awards, including the North Queensland Tourism Awards for Eco-tourism (2002 & 2006) and the Townsville City Council Environmental Excellence Award (1999).
