= Gundlachia (gastropod) =

Scientific classification
- Kingdom: Animalia
- Phylum: Mollusca
- Class: Gastropoda
- Superorder: Hygrophila
- Family: Planorbidae
- Genus: Gundlachia; Pfeiffer, 1849

Species
- See text

Genus of gastropods

Gundlachia is a genus of minute freshwater snails or limpets, aquatic pulmonate gastropod molluscs in the family Planorbidae, the ram's horn snails and their allies.

The generic name is in honor of Cuban naturalist Juan Gundlach (1810–1896).

== Anatomy ==
These animals have a pallial lung, as do all pulmonate snails, but they also have a false gill or "pseudobranch". This serves as a gill as, in their non-tidal habitat, these limpets never reach the surface for air.

== Distribution ==
They have a worldwide distribution.

== Species ==
Species within the genus Gundlachia include:

- Gundlachia bakeri Pilsbry, 1913
- Gundlachia leucaspis (Ancey, 1901)
- Gundlachia lucasi Suter, 1905
- Gundlachia lutzi Walker, 1925
- Gundlachia meehiana Stimpson
- Gundlachia radiata (Guilding, 1828)
- Gundlachia ticaga (Marcus & Marcus, 1962)

Synonyms:

- Gundlachia neozelanica Suter, 1905 is a synonym for Ferrissia neozelanicus (Suter, 1905)
- Gundlachia moricandi (d'Orbigny, 1837) is a synonym for Hebetancylus moricandi (d'Orbigny, 1837)
- Gundlachia concentrica (d’Orbigny, 1835) is a synonym for Uncancylus concentricus (d'Orbigny, 1835)
