= Isidorella =

Scientific classification
- Kingdom: Animalia
- Phylum: Mollusca
- Class: Gastropoda
- Superorder: Hygrophila
- Family: Planorbidae
- Genus: Isidorella; Tate, 1896

Genus of gastropods

Isidorella is a genus of air-breathing freshwater snails, aquatic pulmonate gastropod mollusks in the family Planorbidae, the ram's horn snails.

All species within family Planorbidae have sinistral shells.

Species of Isidorella may appear to be very similar species of Glyptophysa. However, Isidorella may differentiated by their lack of a stylet and an accessory structure. Isidorella also have a two-lobed penis, unlike Glyptophysa.

== Distribution ==
This genus is endemic to mainland Australia.

== Species ==
Species within this genus include:

- Isidorella bradshawi Iredale, 1943
- Isidorella egregia (Preston, 1906)
- Isidorella ferruginea (Adams and Angas, 1864)
- Isidorella hainesii (Tryon, 1866)
- Isidorella newcombi (A. Adams & Angas, 1864) - type species

Walker (1988) considered all examined specimens from Australia from this genus as Isidorella newcombi sensu lato.

== Ecology ==
Isidorella snails are grazers-scrapers and are capable of aestivation. Isidorella may be found in ponds, billabongs, swamps, and sluggish streams and rivers.
