= Balade, New Caledonia =

Balade
- Village
- Location in New Caledonia
- Coordinates: 20°18′34″S 164°30′00″E
- Country: France
- Overseas Territory: New Caledonia

Balade, also written Balaide, is a village located in the north of New Caledonia. It was the site of the establishment of a Catholic mission in 1843, and the location of the first Catholic church on the island, which still exists to this day.

== History ==
The bay of Balade is the site where James Cook first visited the island on 4 September 1774, as well as where the ship Bucéphale landed the missionaries in 1843 and where Admiral Auguste Febvrier Despointes disembarked from the ship Le Phoque to take possession of New Caledonia for France in the name of Napoleon III on 24 September 1853.

Balade is where Catholic Missionaries established themselves on the island in 1843, celebrating the first mass on 2km north on the beach at Maamaat. A church, the Église de Saint Denis, which is still standing today, and was the first Catholic church on the island, was established at Balade in 1845. In 1847, due to famine and disease that had spread among the missionaries, caused rebellion to spread among the natives, who then beheaded Father Blaise Marmoiton, one of the missionaries. This incident is depicted in the church's stained glass windows.

In 1913, a monument was erected in Balade to commemorate 60 years since the French occupied New Caledonia. The monument remains, however the area and path up to the monument are not maintained and have become overgrown, as they are rarely visited.

The church at Balade was subject to vandalism in 2024, having the door and the altar set alight, along with graffiti being found.
