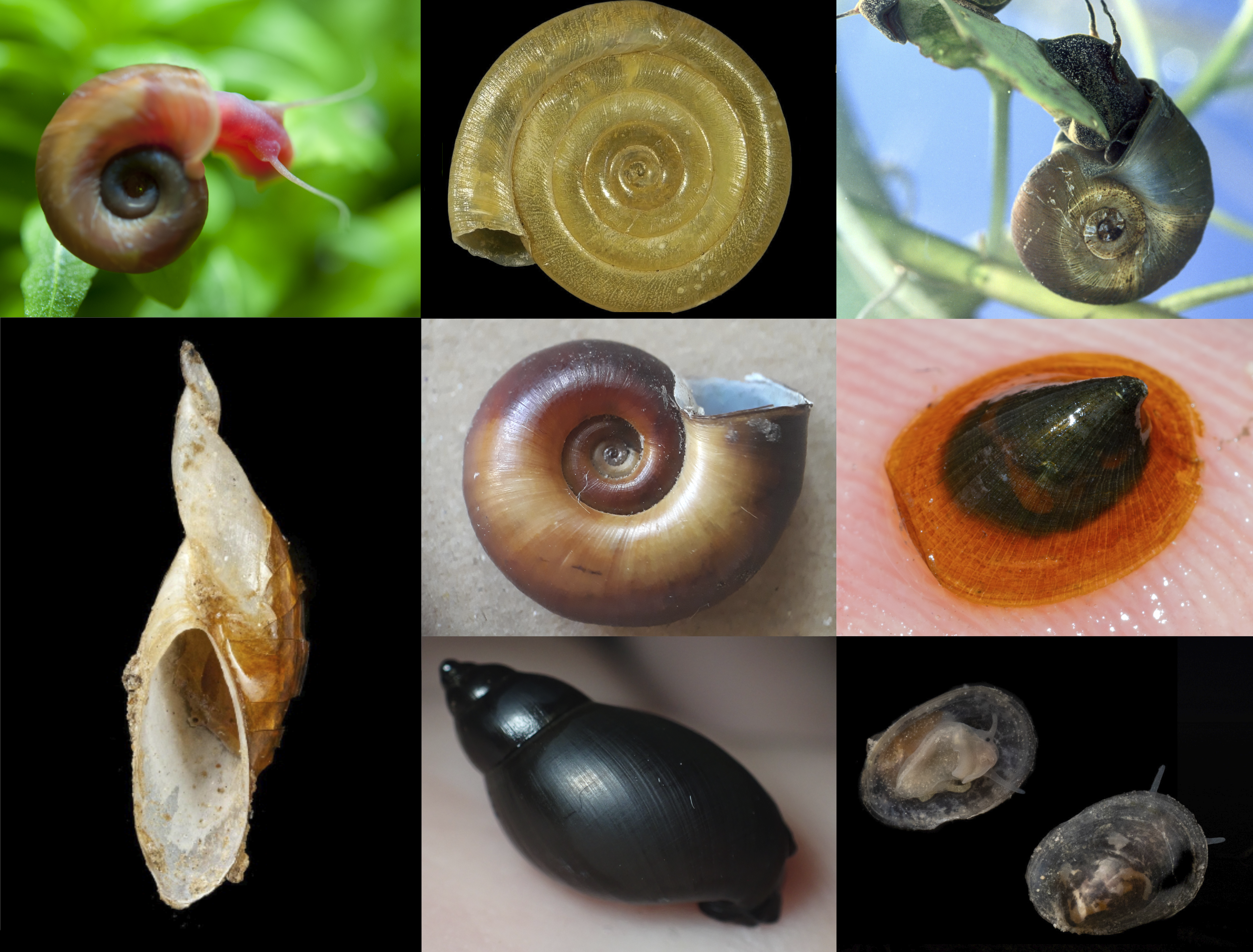
- Various planorbid species (from left to right): Planorbis planorbis, Anisus vortex, Planorbella trivolvis, Camptoceras terebra, Planorbarius corneus, Ancylus fluviatilis, Glyptophysa novahollandica, Ferrissia rivularis

Scientific classification
- Kingdom: Animalia
- Phylum: Mollusca
- Class: Gastropoda
- Superorder: Hygrophila
- Superfamily: Lymnaeoidea
- Family: Planorbidae; Rafinesque, 1815

Subfamiles
- Ancylinae; Miratestinae; Planorbinae

Diversity
- About 250 freshwater species

Synonyms
- Laevapicidae Hannibal, 1914; junior subjective synonym; Laevapicinae Hannibal, 1914; junior subjective synonym

= Planorbidae =

Family of gastropods

Planorbidae, common name the ramshorn snails or ram's horn snails, is a family of air-breathing freshwater snails, aquatic pulmonate gastropod molluscs. The group is composed of three subfamilies: the Ancylinae, Miratestinae, and Planorbinae. Unlike most molluscs, the blood of ram's horn snails contains iron-based hemoglobin instead of copper-based hemocyanin. As a result, planorbids are able to breathe oxygen more efficiently than other molluscs. The presence of hemoglobin gives the body a reddish colour. This is especially apparent in albino animals.

Being air breathers like other Panpulmonata, planorbids do not have gills, but instead, have a lung. The foot and head of planorbids are rather small, while their thread-like tentacles are relatively long. Many of the species in this family have coiled shells that are planispiral, in other words, the shells are more or less coiled flat, rather than having an elevated spire as is the case in most gastropod shells. Although they carry their shell in a way that makes it appear to be dextral, the shell of coiled planorbids is in fact sinistral in coiling, but is carried upside down, which makes it appear to be dextral.

== Description ==
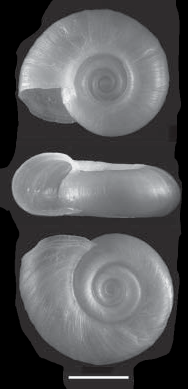
Apical, apertural and umbilical view of the shell of Biomphalaria tenagophila. Scale bar is 3 mm.

The shells of most species in this family are disk-like or button-like, being coiled in one plane, although several groups have shells that are more higher-spired, and some are limpet-like.

All coiled shell Planorbidae are sinistral in their shell coiling, as is proved by their internal anatomy (the respiratory and the genital orifice are situated on the left side), however the animals carry their shells with what would normally be the ventral (i.e. umbilical) surface uppermost, and because of this, the shells appear to be dextral. Planorbids were once thought to have dextral shells, and so species of this family were figured as if they had dextral shells. Although it is now understood that these species are sinistral in shell coiling, disk-like planorbid shells are often still shown in illustrations oriented as if they were dextral.

Most species of coiled planorbids have a rather thin and moderately smooth shell, although more distinct sculpture such as a keel occurs in, and is diagnostic of, certain species. In the flat, keeled species, the whorls tend to overlap. Nearly all shells are composed of growth lines.

The aperture has a sharp outer lip. A peristome can be present, but often the lip is not thickened nor reflected. Those planorbid species which have a high-spired shell may have a narrow umbilicus, but frequently this is covered by callus.

In height most species vary between 6 mm and 6 cm, however, disk-like shells are usually less than about 2 cm in maximum dimension.

Like all pulmonate aquatic snails, ramshorn shells do not have an operculum to close the shell aperture.

=== Sinistral shells ===
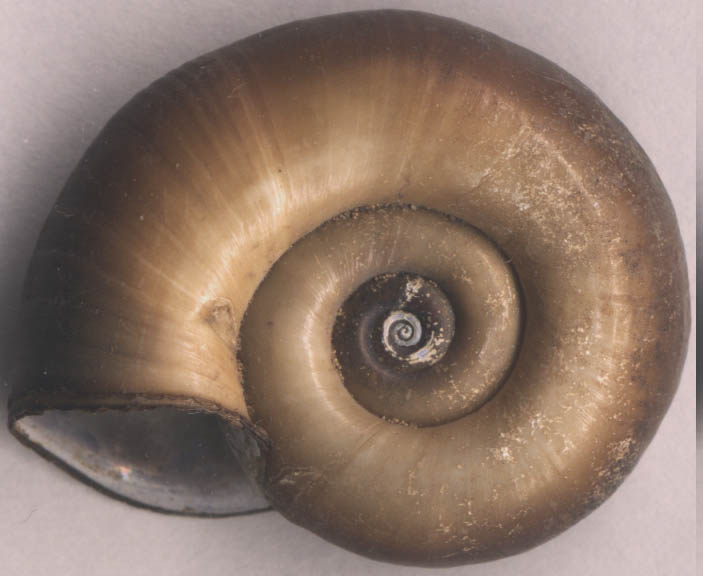
Planorbarius corneus. View of the sunken spire (held facing downwards in life)

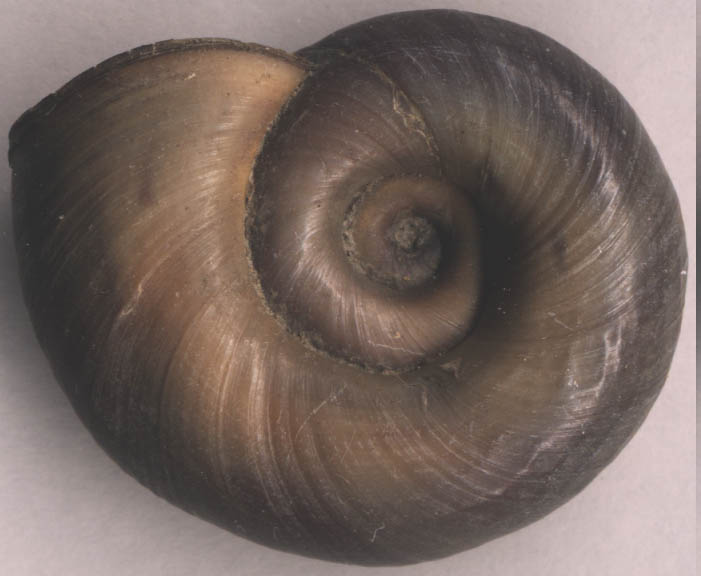
Planorbarius corneus. View of the umbilicus (held uppermost in life)

Flat-coiled planorbid gastropod shells are hard to understand in terms of their coiling and orientation. Many of the shells of species in this family are almost planispiral in coiling such that one side of the shell often looks rather like the other side, but it is important to bear in mind that nonetheless there is an umbilical side and a spire side of the shell. The shells of planorbids are sinistral on close inspection, despite the fact that most species carry the shell as if it were a normal dextral shell.

The side of the shell which is in fact the spire (a sunken spire) faces down in the living animal, contrary to what is the case in almost all other shelled gastropods. Because the shell is carried "upside down" like this, the aperture of the shell is angled to face downwards also, so the aperture faces towards the spire, not away from it. and the umbilicus faces upwards. The spire of the shell is quite sunken in many species.

The umbilicus of the shell is very wide and shallow, and faces upwards. In some species the umbilicus is not as deeply "dished" as the sunken spire, so it may be hard to tell one from the other without close inspection.

== Distribution and habitat ==
Species in this family occur worldwide. Most species of planorbids live only in fresh water, such as ponds, lakes, and slow moving rivers. However, some species are known to tolerate conditions such as brackish water or sewage.

== Geological history ==
Ancestors of ramshorn snails are known with certainty since the Jurassic period, but there are a few possible earlier occurrences starting in the Late Devonian.

== Taxonomy ==
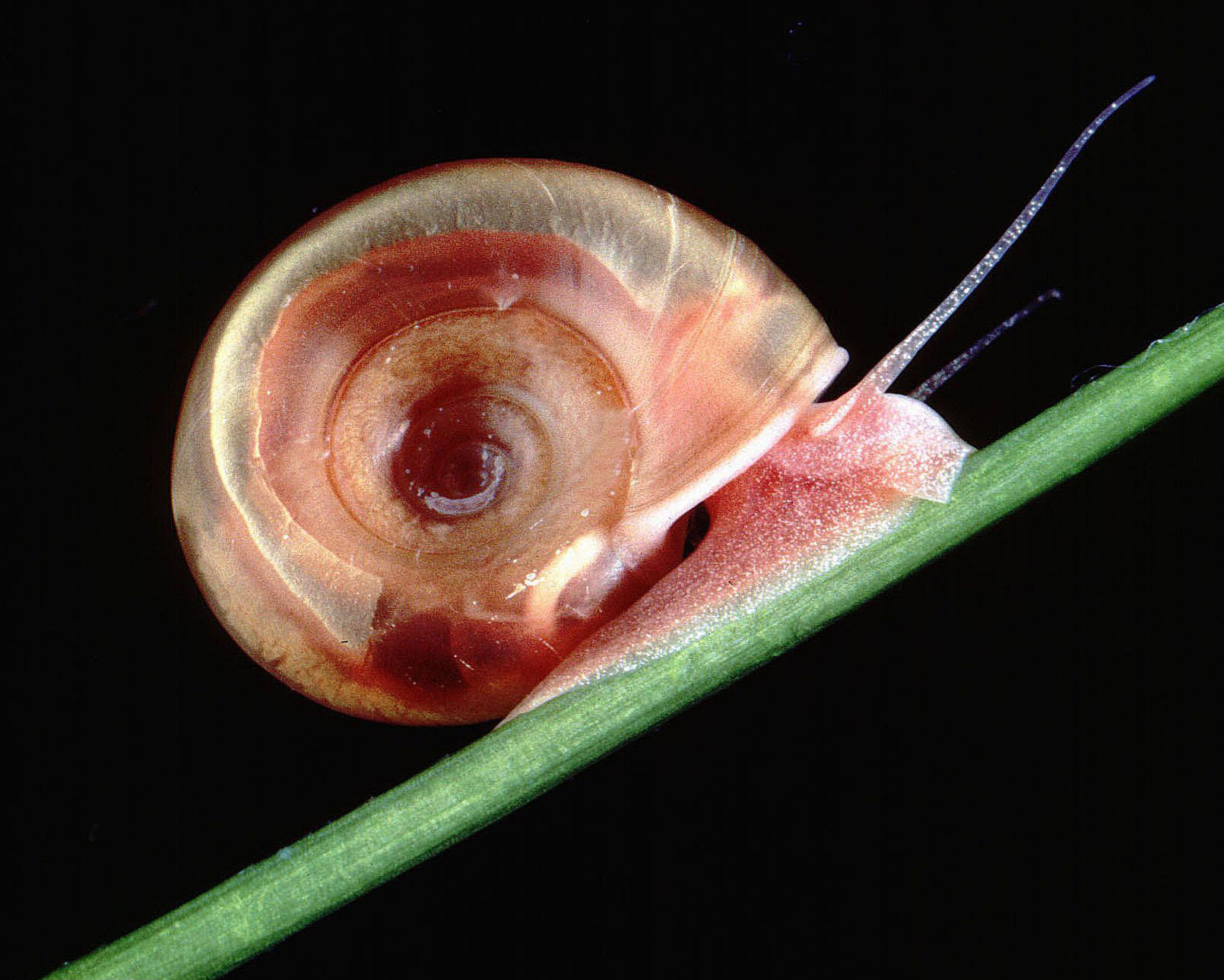
Albino planorbid clearly shows the reddish-colored body tissues due to the pigment hemoglobin

The following genera are recognised in the family Planorbidae:

- Subfamily Ancylinae Rafinesque, 1815
  - Genus †Ancylina Bandel & F. Riedel, 1994
  - Genus †Palaeancylus Yen, 1948
  - Tribe Ancylini Rafinesque, 1815
    - Genus Ancylus O. F. Müller, 1773
    - Genus Ferrissia B. Walker, 1903
    - Genus Pettancylus Iredale, 1943
    - Genus Rhodacmea B. Walker, 1917
    - Genus Stimulator Iredale, 1944
  - Tribe Laevapicini Hannibal, 1912
    - Genus Anisancylus Pilsbry, 1924
    - Genus Gundlachia L. Pfeiffer, 1849
    - Genus Hebetancylus Pilsbry, 1914
    - Genus Laevapex B. Walker, 1903
    - Genus Sineancylus Gutiérrez Gregoric, 2014
    - Genus Uncancylus Pilsbry, 1914
- Subfamily Miratestinae P. Sarasin & F. Sarasin, 1897
  - Genus Amerianna Strand, 1928
  - Genus Ancylastrum Bourguignat, 1853
  - Genus Bayardella J. B. Burch, 1977
  - Genus Glyptophysa Crosse, 1872
  - Genus Isidorella Tate, 1896
  - Genus Kessneria J. C. Walker & Ponder, 2001
  - Genus Leichhardtia J. C. Walker, 1988
  - Genus Miratesta P. Sarasin & F. Sarasin, 1897
  - Genus Patelloplanorbis Hubendick, 1957
  - Genus Protancylus P. Sarasin & F. Sarasin, 1897
- Subfamily Planorbinae Rafinesque, 1815
  - Genus †Asymmetrorbis Neubauer, 2025
  - Tribe Camptoceratini Dall, 1870
    - Genus Camptoceras W. H. Benson, 1843
    - Genus Culmenella Clench, 1927
  - Tribe Coretini J. E. Gray, 1847
    - Genus Planorbarius Duméril, 1805
  - Tribe Drepanotrematini Zilch, 1959
    - Genus Antillorbis H. W. Harry & Hubendick, 1964
    - Genus Drepanotrema P. Fischer & Crosse, 1880
  - Tribe Helisomatini F. C. Baker, 1928
    - Genus Acrorbis Odhner, 1937
    - Genus Biomphalaria Preston, 1910
    - Genus Dilatata Clessin, 1884
    - Genus Helisoma Swainson, 1840
    - Genus Menetus H. Adams & A. Adams, 1855
    - Genus Pecosorbis D. W. Taylor, 1985
    - Genus Planorbella Haldeman, 1843
    - Genus Planorbula Haldeman, 1840
    - Genus Promenetus F. C. Baker, 1935
    - Genus Vorticifex Meek, 1870
  - Tribe Neoplanorbini Hannibal, 1912
    - Genus Amphigyra Pilsbry, 1906
    - Genus Neoplanorbis Pilsbry, 1906
    - Genus †Payettia Dall, 1924
  - Tribe Planorbini Rafinesque, 1815
    - Genus Afrogyrorbis Starobogatov, 1967
    - Genus Anisus S. Studer, 1820
    - Genus Armiger Hartmann, 1843
    - Genus Bathyomphalus Charpentier, 1837
    - Genus Choanomphalus Gerstfeldt, 1859
    - Genus Gyraulus Charpentier, 1837
    - Genus Hovorbis D. S. Brown & Mandahl-Barth, 1973
    - Genus †Orygoceras Brusina, 1882
    - Genus Planorbis O. F. Müller, 1773
  - Tribe Segmentinini F. C. Baker, 1945
    - Genus Helicorbis W. H. Benson, 1855
    - Genus Hippeutis Charpentier, 1837
    - Genus Intha Annandale, 1922
    - Genus Kolhymorbis Starobogatov & Streletzkaja, 1967
    - Genus Lentorbis Mandahl-Barth, 1954
    - Genus Polypylis Pilsbry, 1906
    - Genus Segmentina J. Fleming, 1818
    - Genus Segmentorbis Mandahl-Barth, 1954
    - Genus Trochorbis W. H. Benson, 1855
  - Genus Theratodocion D. S. Brown & Verdcourt, 1998

Planorbidae incertae sedis:

- Genus †Ampullariella Raspail, 1909
- Genus †Archaeoplanorbis W. Yu, 1982
- Genus †Atopippeutis Kadolsky, 2015
- Genus †Brannerillus Hannibal, 1912
- Genus †Fuchsogyra Bandel, 2010
- Genus †Graptophysa Yen & Reeside, 1946
- Genus †Headonia Harzhauser & Neubauer, 2020
- Genus †Idahoella Yen, 1948
- Genus †Jiangyouspira H.-Z. Pan, 1984
- Genus †Liangulorbis Wenz, 1947
- Genus †Marinescugyra Bandel, 2010
- Genus †Mioplatytaphius Čtyroký, 1972
- Genus †Nihewanspira S.-Y. Guo, 1983
- Genus †Omalodiscus W. H. Benson, 1855
- Genus †Paraplanorbis G. D. Hanna, 1922
- Genus †Pentagoniostoma C. C. Branson, 1935
- Genus †Physoides H.-Z. Pan, 1982
- Genus †Planorbifex Pilsbry, 1935
- Genus †Pompholopsis Call, 1888
- Genus †Proplanorbarius Bandel, 1991
- Genus †Proplanorbis Starobogatov, 1967
- Genus †Pseudophysa Yen, 1938
- Genus †Rostroapertura Firby, 1963
- Genus †Sinoplanorbis W. Yü, 1965
- Genus †Sinosegmentina Y.-T. Li, 1986
- Genus †Steklovidiscus Gozhik & Prysjazhnjuk, 1980
