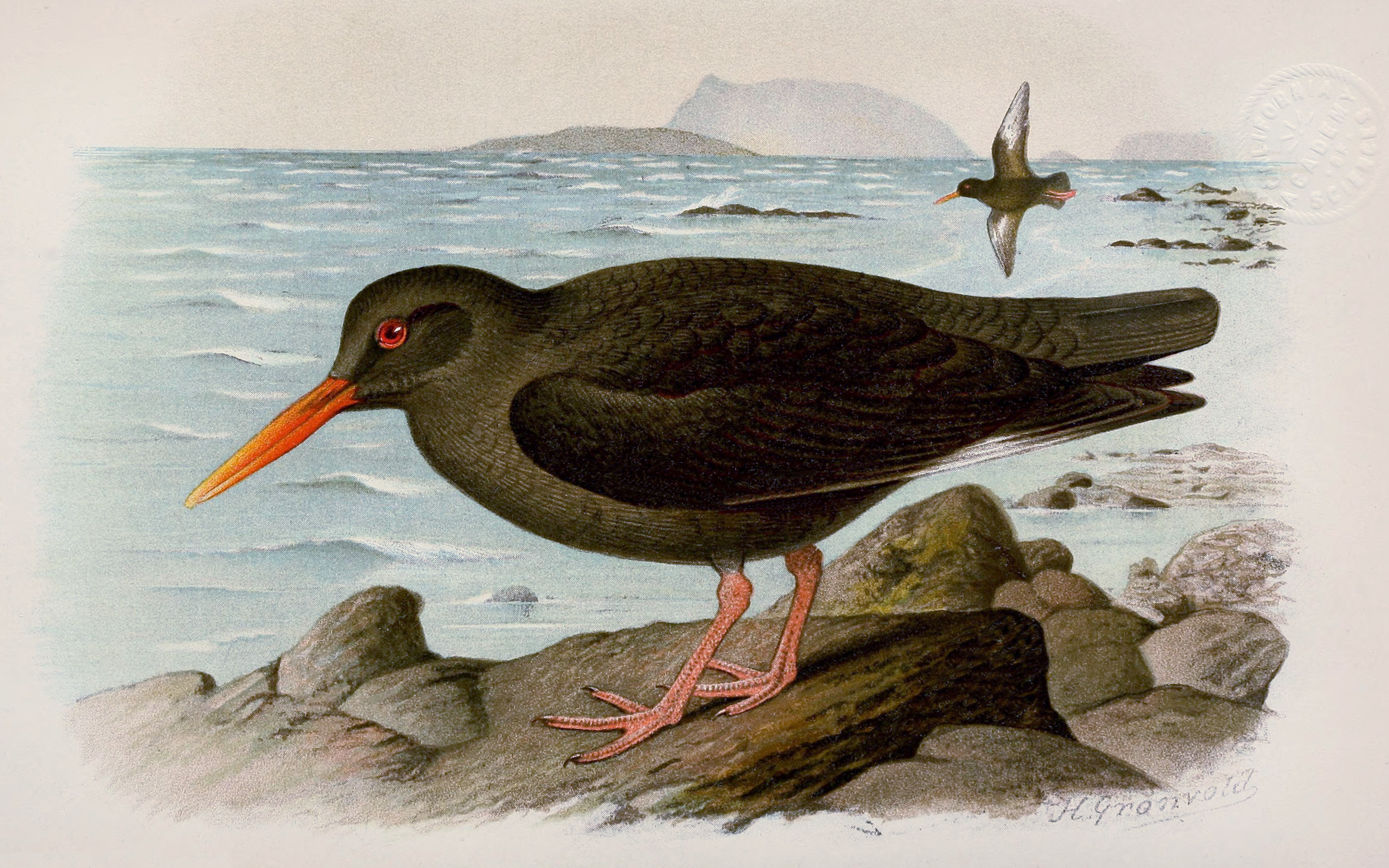
- Illustration by Henrik Grønvold from 1914

Conservation status
- Extinct (1950) (IUCN 3.1)

Scientific classification
- Kingdom: Animalia
- Phylum: Chordata
- Class: Aves
- Order: Charadriiformes
- Family: Haematopodidae
- Genus: Haematopus
- Species: †H. meadewaldoi

Binomial name
- †Haematopus meadewaldoi Bannerman, 1913

Synonyms
- Haematopus niger meade-waldoi Bannerman, 1913; Haematopus moquini meadewaldoi; Haematopus ostralegus meadewaldoi

= Canary Islands oystercatcher =

Species of bird

The Canary Islands oystercatcher, Canarian oystercatcher, or Canarian black oystercatcher (Haematopus meadewaldoi) (Note: Etymology: Haematopus, Latinized Ancient Greek for "bloody-footed", from (h)aimato- (αίματό-), '"blood-" + -p(o)us (πουϛ), "foot". meadewaldoi, dedicated to Edmund Meade-Waldo. The specific name was formerly usually written meade-waldoi.) is an extinct shorebird of uncertain taxonomy endemic to Fuerteventura, Lanzarote, and their offshore islets (Islote de Lobos and the Chinijo Archipelago) in the Canary Islands in Spain. Its population declined sharply beginning in the 1800s due primarily to overharvesting by humans of their shared food sources in the intertidal zone. Since the 1940s, the Canary Islands oystercatcher has been considered to be extinct.

== Taxonomy ==
The taxonomic status of the species is uncertain. The Canary Islands oystercatcher was considered a population of the African oystercatcher (Haematopus moquini) until David Armitage Bannerman identified it as the unique subspecies H. m. meadewaldoi in 1913. Work by Philip Hockey in 1982 found the Canary Islands oystercatcher to be distinct enough from the African oystercatcher to be split into its own species. Subsequent analysis of the Canary Islands oystercatcher's mitogenome found its genetic differentiation to fall well within the range observed in the Eurasian oystercatcher (Haematopus ostralegus) and proposed that H. meadewaldoi be reclassified as either a melanistic colour morph or subspecies. However, other researchers argue based on morphometry that H. meadewaldoi is as distinct from H. ostralegus as other generally accepted species. As of 2025, taxonomies such as the IOC World Bird List and Clements list continue to accept H. meadewaldoi as a distinct species.

== Description ==
19th century illustration

The Canary Islands oystercatcher was of similar size as its relatives, the African and Eurasian oystercatchers, at about 43 cm (17 in). It was slightly lighter than the African species, which weighs between 600–800 grams (21–28 oz), with females being heavier than males. Its bill was 80–86 mm (3.1–3.4 in) long in males and markedly longer in females, around 87–92 mm (3.4–3.6 in). The tarsus measured around 53 mm (2.1 in), and the wings were around 250 mm (9.8 in) long. Its bill was laterally compressed, and with a blunt, lighter tip. The eye was red, with a narrow reddish-orange naked eye ring, and the legs and feet were dark pink with ivory-coloured nails. As usual in oystercatchers, it had no hallux and the second and third toes were connected by a small web.

The overall appearance of the Canary Islands oystercatcher was extremely similar to the African species, to the extent that even museum specimens are difficult to distinguish except by measurements, or genetic tests. Its bill was longer and its wings were shorter than in the African species. H. meadewaldoi had a glossy black colour overall save for the whitish underwing bases of the primary remiges' inner webs, but this may have not been present in worn plumage which also was duller. The distribution did not overlap with the African oystercatcher H. moquini, which is not known to occur north of Lobito, Angola at least in modern times, though a specimen in the British Museum from Gambia in 1938 proved to be a vagrant H. moquini on genetic analysis.

The sexes did not differ in plumage; juvenile birds are unknown but probably had duller bare parts and some greyish-buff fringes to the feathers. The colour of downy young is likewise unknown; these are generally brownish-grey above with dark striping to provide camouflage against predators such as gulls; considering the dark lava rock habitat of this species, they were probably fairly dark overall and had a dusky belly.

== Habits ==
The Canary Islands oystercatcher was apparently an all-year resident, and seems to have never bred or even strayed outside the eastern Canaries at least in historic times. Information about its ecology are scant and usually second-hand or inferred from circumstantial information. However, even though conjectural, these informations are consistent as the biology of oystercatchers is not very variable and the species was a conspicuous bird well known to locals. It was called cuervo marino ("sea raven") on Fuerteventura, grajo de mar ("sea chough" (Note: In mainland Spain, grajo denotes the rook, which does not occur on the Canaries.)) on Lanzarote, and corvino ("little raven") on Graciosa. In addition, the local name lapero ("limpet-eater") was also used, possibly on Alegranza.

The Canary Islands oystercatcher was in all likelihood a bird of the rocky shore rather than sandy beaches; the latter are scarce on the volcanic Canary Islands, and it might have been driven from them as they were more heavily used by people. What is known about its feeding habits indicates that it had always been less commonly found in beach habitat. As with all oystercatchers, its diet consisted of small molluscs and crustaceans rather than oysters. Especially the limpets Patella candei, Patella piperata, and Patella cf. ulyssiponensis, as well as the African mussel Perna (perna) picta were favoured prey items.

Its vocalizations were given as repeated kvirr or kvik-kvikkvik, and the alarm call peepe-peepe peepe-peepe. The birds appear to have been territorial in the breeding season and vagrant, but not occurring in large groups, at other times.

=== Reproduction ===
Like other oystercatchers, this species did not build a nest but laid its eggs in a scrape on the seaside; apparently it chose the most deserted locations such as the mouths of barrancos (erosion gullies); eggs or nests were never recorded by researchers. Its courtship was reported to be peculiar, with two or three males joining in a "dancing" display, presenting themselves to best effect. Once the females had chosen a partner, they remained monogamous, probably for life if the pairing proved successful as in most other species of the genus. The clutch size was undocumented but possibly there was only one egg; groups of three, but not four birds were commonly seen. The eggs can be assumed to have been camouflaged as in its relatives; in the case of this species, they thus were probably rather dark overall, dull brownish grey with plenty of black, dark brown, and dark purplish splotches and scribbles. Egg size was probably about 60 mm × 40 mm (2.4 in × 1.6 in) on average.

The breeding season is also unknown, but from observations of courtship and birds in laying condition, it started around April. Comparison with its relatives suggests that incubation lasted for around 30 days, maybe less, with the chicks taking around 35 days again to fledge. The three-bird groups started to occur on more populated regions in June. Females took probably 3 years to reach sexual maturity and males 4; this species can be assumed to have been long-lived like other oystercatchers, which not infrequently live for 20 or even more than 30 years. Unusually, the birds seem to have moulted after the breeding season; 2 females shot in April had worn plumage.

== Extinction ==
Due to its restricted range and narrow habitat requirements, the population of the Canary Island oystercatcher likely only ever totaled a few hundred pairs. Its decline likely started in the 19th century and proceeded rapidly; by 1913, when the bird was last collected, the species was thought to remain primarily on the Chinijo Archipelago and Islote de Lobos. Local fishermen and lighthouse keepers reported it had completely disappeared by the 1940s. Extensive targeted surveys between 1956 and 1986 failed to find any evidence of the Canary Islands oystercatcher surviving, and no sightings have occurred during regular bird censuses of the islands in the 21st century. The Canary Islands oystercatcher has been considered extinct on the IUCN Red List since 1994.

There were sight records of 3 black oystercatchers from the coast of Senegal in 1970 and 1975 (in the Ziguinchor Region). As the Canary Island oystercatcher was never recorded outside the Canaries archipelago before its likely extinction, these sightings are unlikely to represent this species. Still, no other black species of oystercatcher occurs near Senegal; additionally, melanism is not known in the Eurasian oystercatcher which does winter in the region. Unconfirmed records from Tenerife – in July 1968 at Puerto de la Cruz, and in 1981 at El Médano – could indicate that a small population persisted on uninhabited islets until the early 1980s. Second-hand records from Tenerife also exist for the 19th century.

Over-harvesting of intertidal shellfish by humans was probably the primary cause of the decline and extinction of the Canary Island oystercatcher. Some authors also implicate predation by rats and cats, as well as direct human hunting and harvesting of eggs. Given the small starting size of the population, museum collecting may have been an important contributing factor once the decline was under way. Unsustainable agricultural practices and deforestation led to widespread desertification by the end of the 19th century, which may have contributed to pressure on intertidal habitats by increasing runoff and further driving harvesting of intertidal invertebrates as a food source to compensate for decreased agricultural productivity.

Eight skins and one egg specimen are known to exist. Three are kept in the British Museum of Natural History, including both the type specimen (BMNH 1905.12.22.323, a female collected at Jandía, Fuerteventura on April 7, 1888) and the last known individual. One is located in the World Museum collected by Edmund Meade-Waldo in La Graciosa, a further two in Manchester Museum, and two more in the Museum Koenig Bonn. The only existing egg specimen is at the State Museum of Zoology, Dresden. Four other specimens from historical records have disappeared, including the initial specimens collected in 1829 from La Graciosa by Sabin Berthelot and one shot in April 1852 near Jandía by Carl Bolle. Another skin at the Tring Museum collected from The Gambia may represent this species, but is not universally accepted.

== See also ==
- List of extinct birds
- List of extinct bird species since 1500
- Graja, the endemic La Palma chough subspecies
- List of extinct animals of Europe
