= Ancylus regularis =

Conservation status
- Data Deficient (IUCN 3.1)

Scientific classification
- Kingdom: Animalia
- Phylum: Mollusca
- Class: Gastropoda
- Superorder: Hygrophila
- Family: Planorbidae
- Genus: Ancylus
- Species: A. regularis

Binomial name
- Ancylus regularis Brown, 1973

Species of gastropod

Ancylus regularis is a species of very small, freshwater, air-breathing limpet, an aquatic pulmonate gastropod mollusk in the tribe Ancylini within the family Planorbidae, the ram's horn snails and their allies. This species is endemic to Ethiopia.
