= List of non-marine molluscs of Sudan and South Sudan =

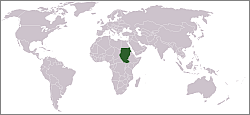
Location of Sudan and South Sudan

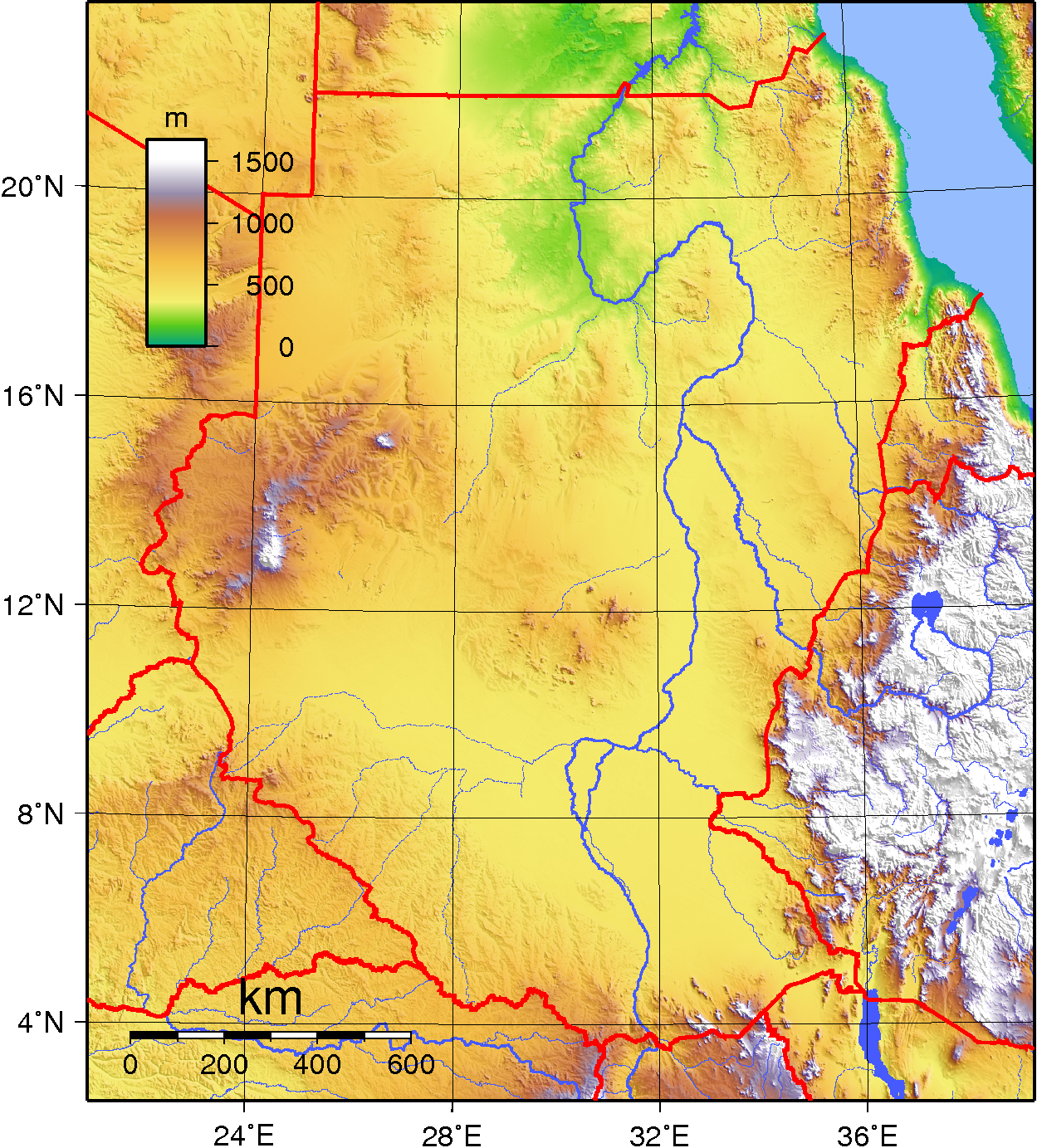
topography of Sudan and South Sudan

The non-marine molluscs of Sudan and South Sudan are a part of the molluscan fauna of the Sudans (wildlife of Sudan, wildlife of South Sudan).

A number of species of non-marine molluscs are found in the wild in the Sudans.

== Freshwater gastropods ==
Freshwater gastropods in the Sudans include:

Ampullariidae

- Lanistes carinatus (Olivier, 1804)
- Marisa cornuarietis (Linnaeus, 1758)

Paludomidae

- Cleopatra bulimoides (Olivier, 1804)

Thiaridae

- Melanoides tuberculata (O. F. Müller, 1774)

Planorbidae

- Biomphalaria pfeifferi (Krauss, 1848)
- Bulinus forskalii (Ehrenberg, 1831)
- Bulinus truncatus (Audouin, 1827)

Lymnaeidae

- Radix natalensis (Krauss, 1848)

== Land gastropods ==
Land gastropods in the Sudans include:

== Bivalves ==
Freshwater bivalves in the Sudans include:

== See also ==
Lists of molluscs of surrounding countries:

- List of non-marine molluscs of Egypt, Wildlife of Egypt
- List of non-marine molluscs of Eritrea, Wildlife of Eritrea
- List of non-marine molluscs of Ethiopia, Wildlife of Ethiopia
- List of non-marine molluscs of Kenya, Wildlife of Kenya
- List of non-marine molluscs of Uganda, Wildlife of Uganda
- List of non-marine molluscs of the Democratic Republic of the Congo, Wildlife of the Democratic Republic of the Congo
- List of non-marine molluscs of the Central African Republic, Wildlife of the Central African Republic
- List of non-marine molluscs of Chad, Wildlife of Chad
- List of non-marine molluscs of Libya, Wildlife of Libya
