= List of non-marine molluscs of Ethiopia =

Location of Libya

The non-marine molluscs of Ethiopia are a part of the molluscan fauna of Ethiopia (wildlife of Ethiopia). Ethiopia is an inland country, so there are no marine molluscs.

A number of species of non-marine molluscs are found in the wild in Ethiopia.

== Freshwater gastropods ==
Ampullariidae

- Pila speciosa

Thiaridae

- Cleopatra ferruginea
- Melanoides tuberculata (O. F. Müller, 1774)

Planorbidae

- Ancylus ashangiensis
- Ancylus regularis
- Biomphalaria barthi
- Bulinus abyssinicus (von Martens, 1866)
- Bulinus hexaploidus
- Bulinus octaploidus

Lymnaeidae

- Radix natalensis (Krauss, 1848)

== See also ==
Lists of molluscs of surrounding countries:

- List of non-marine molluscs of Sudan, Wildlife of Sudan
- List of non-marine molluscs of Djibouti, Wildlife of Djibouti
- List of non-marine molluscs of Eritrea, Wildlife of Eritrea
- List of non-marine molluscs of Somalia, Wildlife of Somalia
- List of non-marine molluscs of Kenya, Wildlife of Kenya
