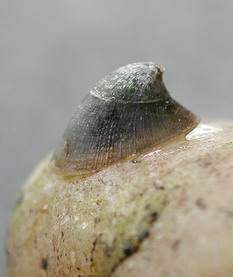

Conservation status
- Least Concern (IUCN 3.1)

Scientific classification
- Domain: Eukaryota
- Kingdom: Animalia
- Phylum: Mollusca
- Class: Gastropoda
- Superorder: Hygrophila
- Family: Planorbidae
- Genus: Ancylus
- Species: A. fluviatilis

Binomial name
- Ancylus fluviatilis O. F. Müller, 1774

= Ancylus fluviatilis =

Species of gastropod

The river limpet (Ancylus fluviatilis) is a species of very small, freshwater, air-breathing limpet, an aquatic pulmonate gastropod mollusk in the tribe Ancylini within the family Planorbidae, the ram's horn snails and their allies.

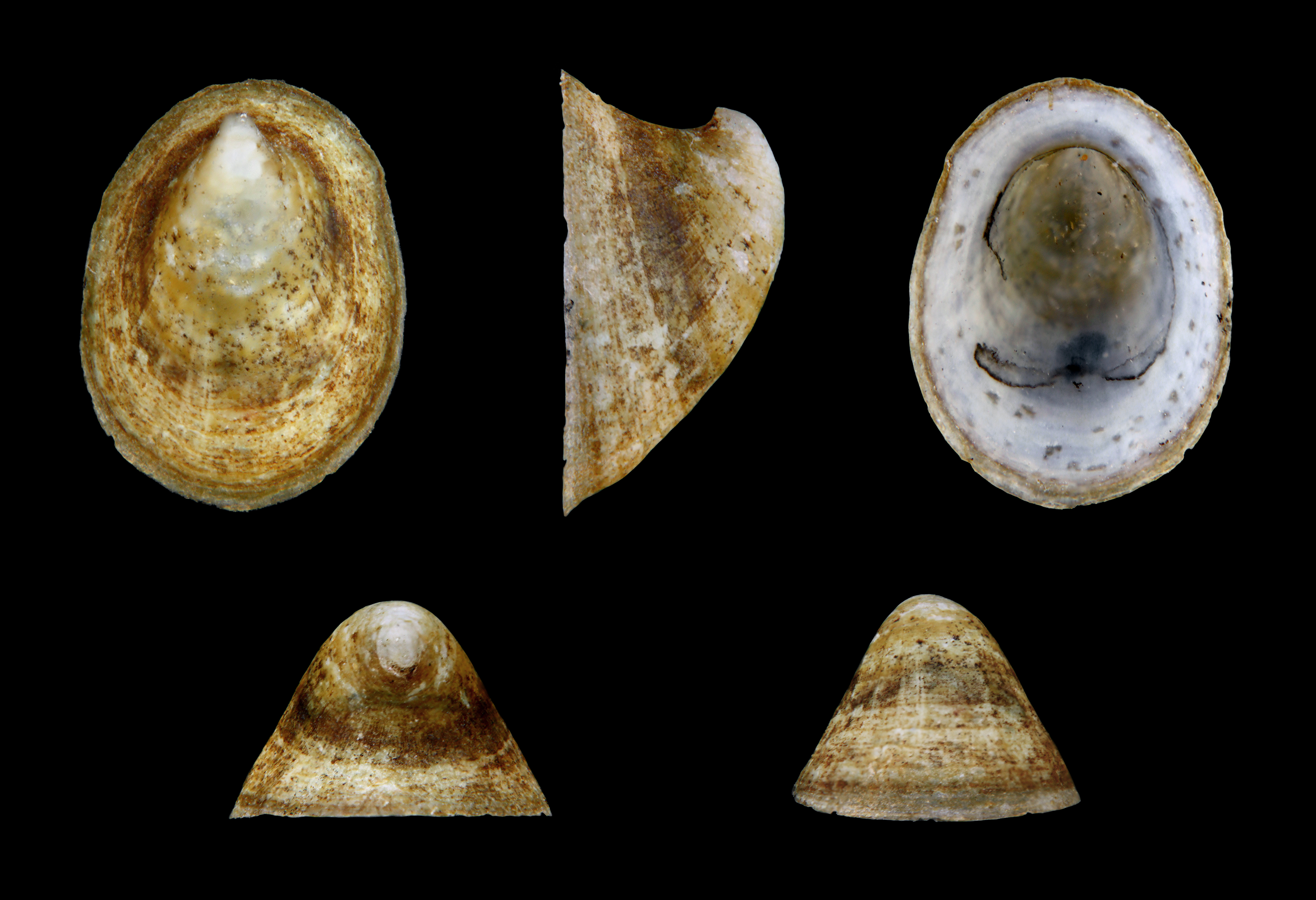
Different views of the shell of Ancylus fluviatilis

== Description ==
The 5–8 mm. limpet-like shell has a backwardly directed, conical apex. The shell shape is higher than Acroloxus and Ferrissia. The apex is blunt when seen from above, but appears more pointed from the side. The shell is bent backwards and very weakly to the right side. It is thin and translucent, with reticulate sculpture and fine growth lines. In colour it is light yellowish to reddish brown or dull pale brown. The animal is grey with black dots near the head and almost entirely covered by the shell. The tentacles are triangular with eyes at their base. The genital pore and pneumostome are very small and located at the right side.

== Distribution ==
The distribution type is Eurosiberian Southern-temperate (the delimitation of various southern and eastern forms which may be given independent species status is not yet understood).

This species occurs in northern, western and central Europe in the following areas:

- Great Britain and Ireland
- Czech Republic
- Germany
- Netherlands
- Poland
- Slovakia
- France
- for other areas see Fauna Europaea.
- not found in the north of Norway, southern Sweden, Finland

In large parts of the Mediterranean area (Iberian Peninsula, Italy, etc.) there are marked forms which according to molecular genetics are so far not named as separate species. Such forms are also found in northeastern Africa (coastal areas of Morocco to Tunisia, Hoggar Mountains in Algeria), as well as in the Highlands up to 2240 m above sea level in Ethiopia. It was found in Saudi Arabia (Brown and Wright 1980, Neubert 1998) and Yemen (Al-Safadi 1990) and in Caucasus (Armenia), but it is not known in the Afrotropical region.

== Habitat ==
This freshwater limpet is a rheophile, which lives in oxygen-rich fast-running waters and also in karst springs. It does not occur in waters which freeze in winter. They need a hard substrate with suitable (not too low and not too rich) algae growth, which is why they are frequent in fresh water in Central Europe especially in rivers and streams. In North America and Western Europe they also occur in lakes. In contrast to many other freshwater snails, the animals tolerate a base-poor acidic environment. Southern European, North African and Middle East representative of the species group can survive exposure due to low water levels, to a certain extent, by forming a protective layer on the underside of the shell. In Central European forms, this is possible only to a limited extent, but they may survive low water levels by adhering firmly on the stone surface.
