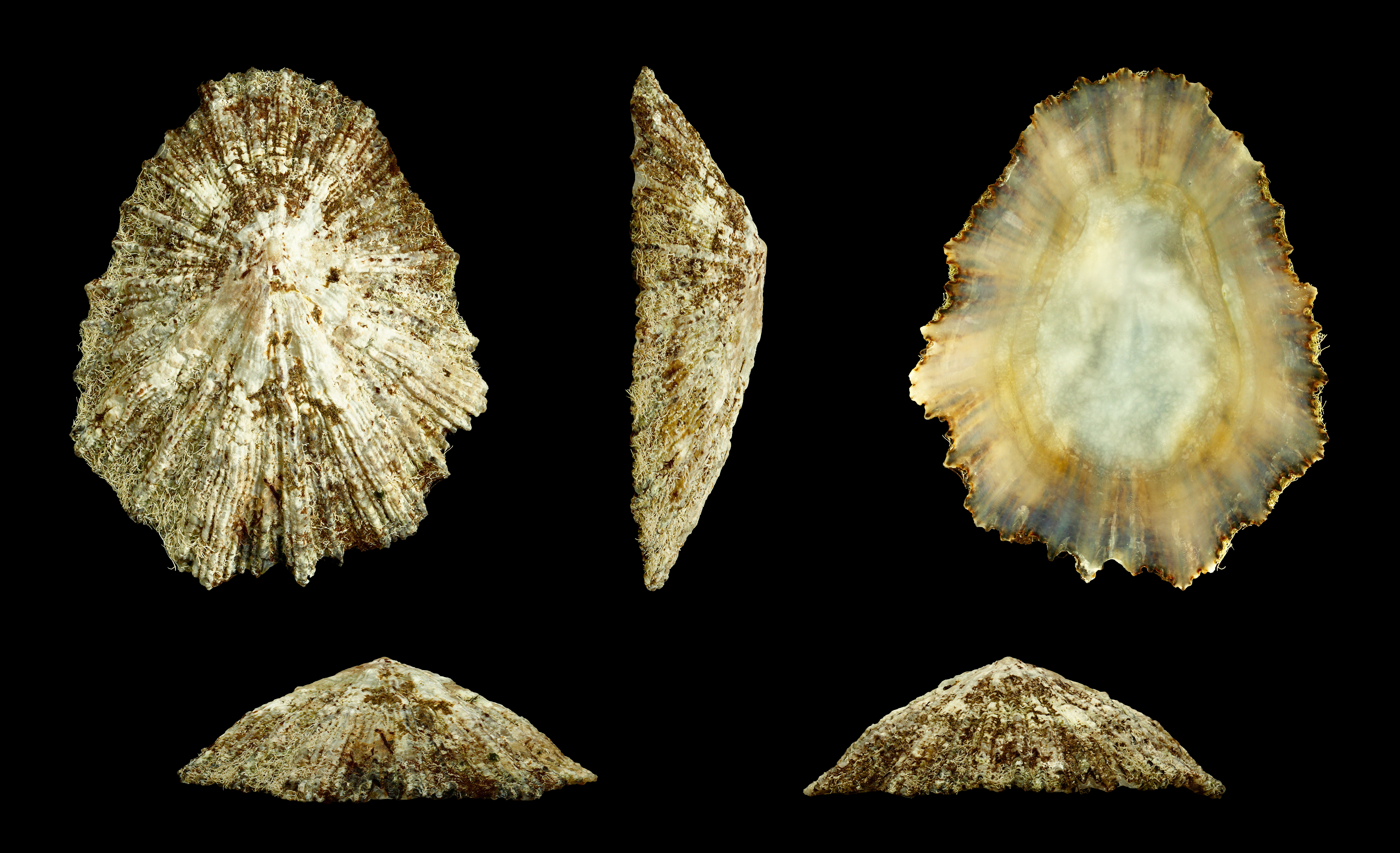

Scientific classification
- Kingdom: Animalia
- Phylum: Mollusca
- Class: Gastropoda
- Subclass: Patellogastropoda
- Family: Patellidae
- Genus: Patella
- Species: P. aspera

Binomial name
- Patella aspera Röding, 1798

= Patella aspera =

Species of gastropod

Patella aspera is a species of limpet, a type of sea snail in the family Patellidae. Long considered to be a subspecies of Patella ulyssiponensis, genetic evidence supports its recognition as a separate species. It is native to Macaronesia. It is known by the common name Azorean limpet, and its local name is lapa brava.

== Description ==
Patella aspera has a pentagonal, flattened shell with deeply indented margins. It is sculpted with numerous, semi-regular furrows that radiate from the apex, which is slightly forward of the central point. The exterior of the shell is light brown and the interior is white to bluish-white, delimited by a brown band. The mantle is edged with translucent tentacles and the foot is yellow or orange. This limpet has a maximum length of about 8 cm (3 in) and a lifespan of eight years for females and nine years for males.

== Distribution ==
Patella aspera is native to the eastern Atlantic Ocean. It is common in the Azores and the coast of Portugal. Its most northerly limit is northern Scotland, and its easternmost limit is the Isle of Wight. It occurs on rocks and in rock pools in the littoral zone.

== Ecology ==
This species lives on rocks in the shallow sublittoral and intertidal zones. It is a keystone species which is of ecological importance as a grazer. Breeding takes place all year round, with a peak of activity in the winter, from January to April.

=== Human use ===
Patella aspera is collected for food, particularly for use in Portuguese cuisine as the delicacy grilled limpets. Patella candei is another limpet species harvested for this purpose.

Overharvesting is the main threat to the species, which has faced population declines and collapse of its fishery. Harvest has been banned in some areas. Overharvesting is particularly damaging to the species because larger individuals are targeted, and these are more likely to be female. The species is protandric, with individuals being born male and often becoming female with age. The loss of the individuals that grow large enough to turn female leaves the population without enough breeding females.

== See also ==
- Grilled limpets
- Patella candei
