= Stimulator consetti =

Scientific classification
- Kingdom: Animalia
- Phylum: Mollusca
- Class: Gastropoda
- Superorder: Hygrophila
- Family: Planorbidae
- Subfamily: Ancylinae
- Tribe: Ancylini
- Genus: Stimulator; Iredale, 1944
- Species: S. consetti

Binomial name
- Stimulator consetti Iredale, 1944

Genus of gastropods

Stimulator is a genus of gastropods in the family Planorbidae. It consists of one species, Stimulator consetti.
