= Bulinus octaploidus =

Conservation status
- Near Threatened (IUCN 2.3)

Scientific classification
- Kingdom: Animalia
- Phylum: Mollusca
- Class: Gastropoda
- Superorder: Hygrophila
- Family: Bulinidae
- Genus: Bulinus
- Species: B. octaploidus

Binomial name
- Bulinus octaploidus Burch, 1972

Species of gastropod

Bulinus octaploidus is a species of gastropod in the family Planorbidae. It is native to Ethiopia.
