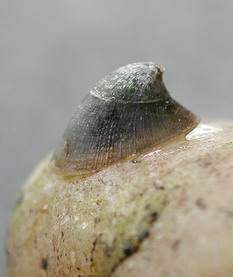
- Ancylus fluviatilis

Scientific classification
- Kingdom: Animalia
- Phylum: Mollusca
- Class: Gastropoda
- Superorder: Hygrophila
- Family: Planorbidae
- Subfamily: Ancylinae
- Tribe: Ancylini
- Genus: Ancylus; O. F. Müller, 1773

Species
- See text

Synonyms
- Ancilus O.F. Müller, 1773 (a misspelling of the generic name Ancylus); Pseudancylus Walker, 1921 (junior objective synonym of Ancylus); Velletia (Ancylus) O. F. Müller, 1773 (new combination)

= Ancylus =

Ancylus Temporal range: Cenozoic

Genus of gastropods

Ancylus is a genus of very small, freshwater, air-breathing limpets. They are aquatic pulmonate gastropod mollusks in the tribe Ancylini within the family Planorbidae, the ram's horn snails and their allies.

The genus is known throughout the Cenozoic.

== Species ==
Species in the genus Ancylus include:

- Ancylus aduncus A. A. Gould, 1847
- † Ancylus alutae Jekelius, 1932
- Ancylus ashangiensis Brown, 1965
- Ancylus benoitianus Bourguignat, 1862
- † Ancylus bourgeoisi Deshayes, 1863
- † Ancylus boyeri Noulet, 1867
- † Ancylus braunii Dunker, 1853
- Ancylus capuloides Jan in Porro, 1838
- † Ancylus cestasensis Peyrot, 1932
- † Ancylus depressus Deshayes, 1824
- † Ancylus dumasi Fontannes, 1884
- † Ancylus elegans J. de C. Sowerby, 1826
- Ancylus expansilabris Clessin, 1881
- Ancylus fluviatilis Müller, 1774 - the type species
- † Ancylus hungaricus Brusina, 1902
- Ancylus lapicidus Hubendick, 1960
- † Ancylus lyelli Maillard, 1892
- † Ancylus moravicus Rzehak, 1893
- † Ancylus ninghaiensis Youluo, 1978
- † Ancylus parmophorus de Stefani, 1880
- Ancylus pileolus
- Ancylus recurvus Martens, 1873
- Ancylus regularis Brown, 1973
- Ancylus rupicola Boubée, 1832
- † Ancylus saucatsensis Peyrot, 1932 (?)
- Ancylus scalariformis Stankovic & Radoman, 1953
- † Ancylus serbicus Brusina, 1893
- Ancylus striatus Quoy & Gaimard, 1834
- Ancylus subcircularis Clessin, 1880
- † Ancylus subcostatus Benoist, 1873
- Ancylus tapirulus Polinski, 1929

Synonyms

- † Ancylus croaticus Brusina, 1902: synonym of † Acroloxus croaticus (Brusina, 1902)
- † Ancylus decussatus Reuss in Reuss & Meyer, 1849: synonym of †Acroloxus decussatus (Reuss in Reuss & Meyer, 1849)
- † Ancylus deperditolacustris Gottschick, 1911: synonym of † Acroloxus deperditolacustris (Gottschick, 1911)
- † Ancylus deperditus (Desmarest, 1814): synonym of † Ferrissia deperdita (Desmarest, 1814)
- Ancylus drouetianus Bourguignat, 1862: synonym of Williamia gussoni (Costa O. G., 1829)
- Ancylus fuscus C. B. Adams, 1840: synonym of Laevapex fuscus (C. B. Adams, 1840)
- Ancylus gibbosus Bourguignat, 1862: synonym of Williamia gussoni (Costa O. G., 1829)
- Ancylus gussonii O. G. Costa, 1829: synonym of Williamia gussonii (O. G. Costa, 1829)
- † Ancylus illyricus Neumayr, 1880: synonym of †Ferrissia illyrica (Neumayr, 1880)
- † Ancylus involutus Pavlović, 1903: synonym of † Acroloxus involutus (Pavlović, 1903)
- † Ancylus michaudi Locard, 1878: synonym of † Acroloxus michaudi (Locard, 1878)
- † Ancylus neumayri Fontannes, 1881: synonym of †Ferrissia neumayri (Fontannes, 1881)
- Ancylus patelloides I. Lea, 1856: synonym of Lanx patelloides (I. Lea, 1856)
- † Ancylus pontileviensis Morgan, 1920: synonym of † Ferrissia pontileviensis (Morgan, 1920)
- † Ancylus wittmanni Schlickum, 1964: synonym of † Ferrissia wittmanni (Schlickum, 1964)

== Cladogram ==
A cladogram based on sequences of mitochondrial 16S ribosomal RNA and cytochrome-c oxidase I (COI) genes showing phylogenic relations of Ancylus by Albrecht et al. (2006):

- Ancylus
  - - Ancylus sp. C
    - - - Ancylus sp. D
        - - Ancylus tapirulus
          - Ancylus lapicidus
          - Ancylus scalariformis
      - Ancylus sp. B
  - - Ancylus sp. A
    - Ancylus fluviatilis
