= Ancylus ashangiensis =

Conservation status
- Critically Endangered (IUCN 3.1)

Scientific classification
- Kingdom: Animalia
- Phylum: Mollusca
- Class: Gastropoda
- Superorder: Hygrophila
- Family: Planorbidae
- Genus: Ancylus
- Species: A. ashangiensis

Binomial name
- Ancylus ashangiensis Brown, 1965

Species of gastropod

Ancylus ashangiensis is a species of small freshwater snail in the family Planorbidae. This species is endemic to Lake Ashangi in Ethiopia. It is threatened by agrochemical pollution and declining water level.

The shell measures 4.8 mm (0.19 in) in length and 2.3 mm (0.091 in) in width.
