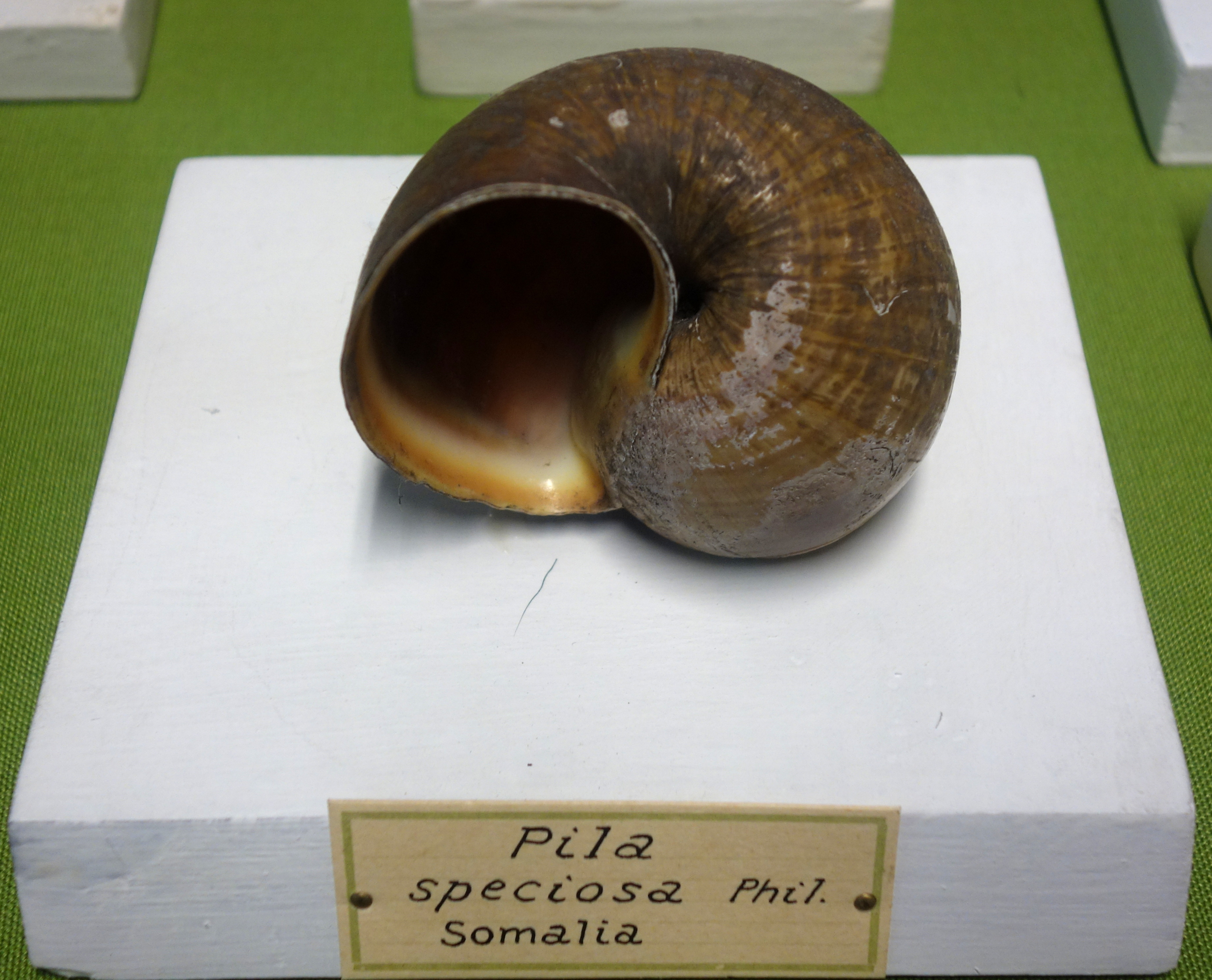
- Pila speciosa shell

Conservation status
- Data Deficient (IUCN 3.1)

Scientific classification
- Kingdom: Animalia
- Phylum: Mollusca
- Class: Gastropoda
- Subclass: Caenogastropoda
- Order: Architaenioglossa
- Family: Ampullariidae
- Genus: Pila
- Species: P. speciosa

Binomial name
- Pila speciosa (Philippi, 1849)

Synonyms
- Ampullaria revoili Billotte, 1885; Ampullaria ruchetiana Billotte, 1885; Ampullaria speciosa R. A. Philippi, 1849 superseded combination

= Pila speciosa =

Species of gastropod

Pila speciosa is a species of freshwater snail in the family Ampullariidae, the apple snails.

== Distribution ==
It has been recorded in southeastern Ethiopia, northeastern Kenya and Somalia.It is considered a rare species.

== Description ==
The shell can grow quite large, up to 105 x 100 mm.

The globose shell has an ovoid shape. It is dextral (right-coiling). It contains 4 convex whorls. The deep suture is distinctly channeled. The body whorl is inflated and slightly attenuated at the base. The apex is pointed. The surface is smooth, showing growth lines). It can be very finely spirally striated when viewed under a lens. The color is chestnut-brown. The interior can be medium brown. The aperture is oval to egg-shaped. It is large, occupying about 3/4 of the shell's length, and is slightly broader below and rounded at the base. The umbilicus is rather wide.

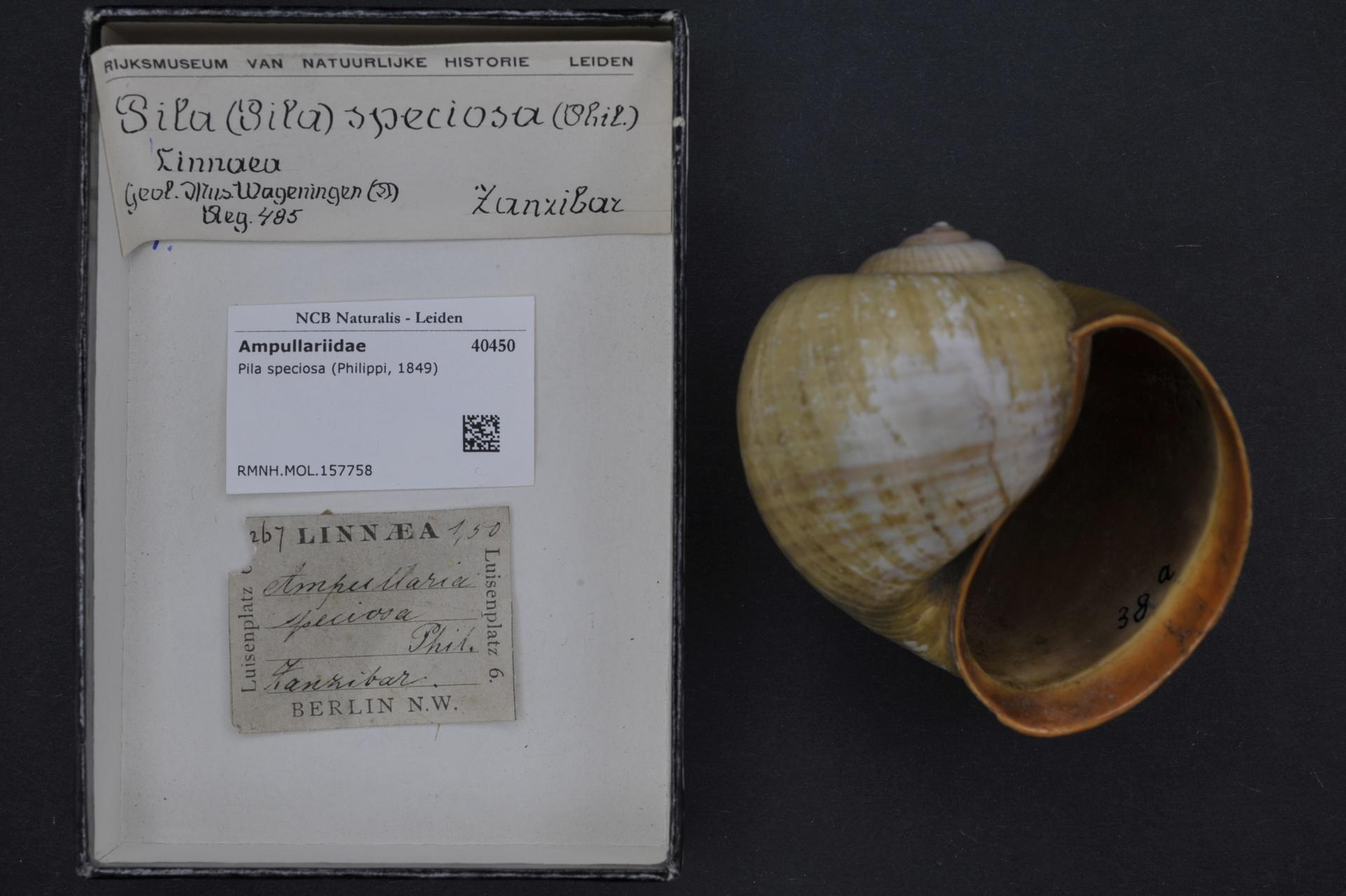
Pila speciosa shell
