= Grilled limpets =

Dish from Madeira & Azores, Portugal

Grilled limpets, likely Patella candei, being served immediately after cooking.

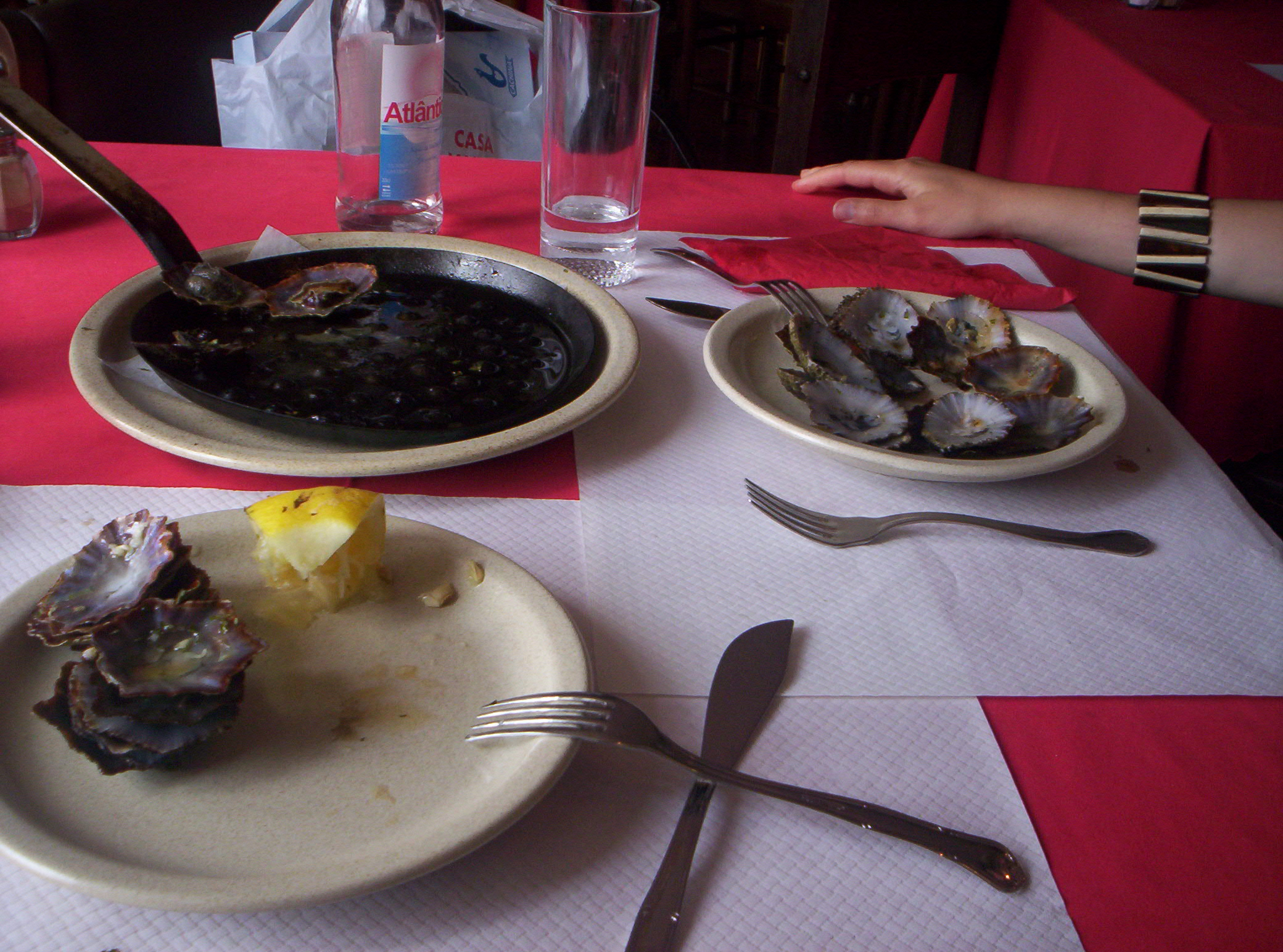
Grilled limpets in the Azores.

Grilled limpets (Portuguese: Lapas grelhadas) are a typical delicacy in the cuisine of the archipelagos of the Azores and Madeira, consisting of seasoned and grilled lapas (limpets) in their own shells usually consumed as an appetizer. The species Patella aspera and Patella candei are the species most commonly used.

The cooking is done on a grill, where the limpets are presented while the griddle they are cooked is served still hot. In the Azores, the main ingredients used for seasoning are paprika paste, garlic, and butter.

== See also ==
- Portuguese cuisine
- Patella aspera
- Patella candei
