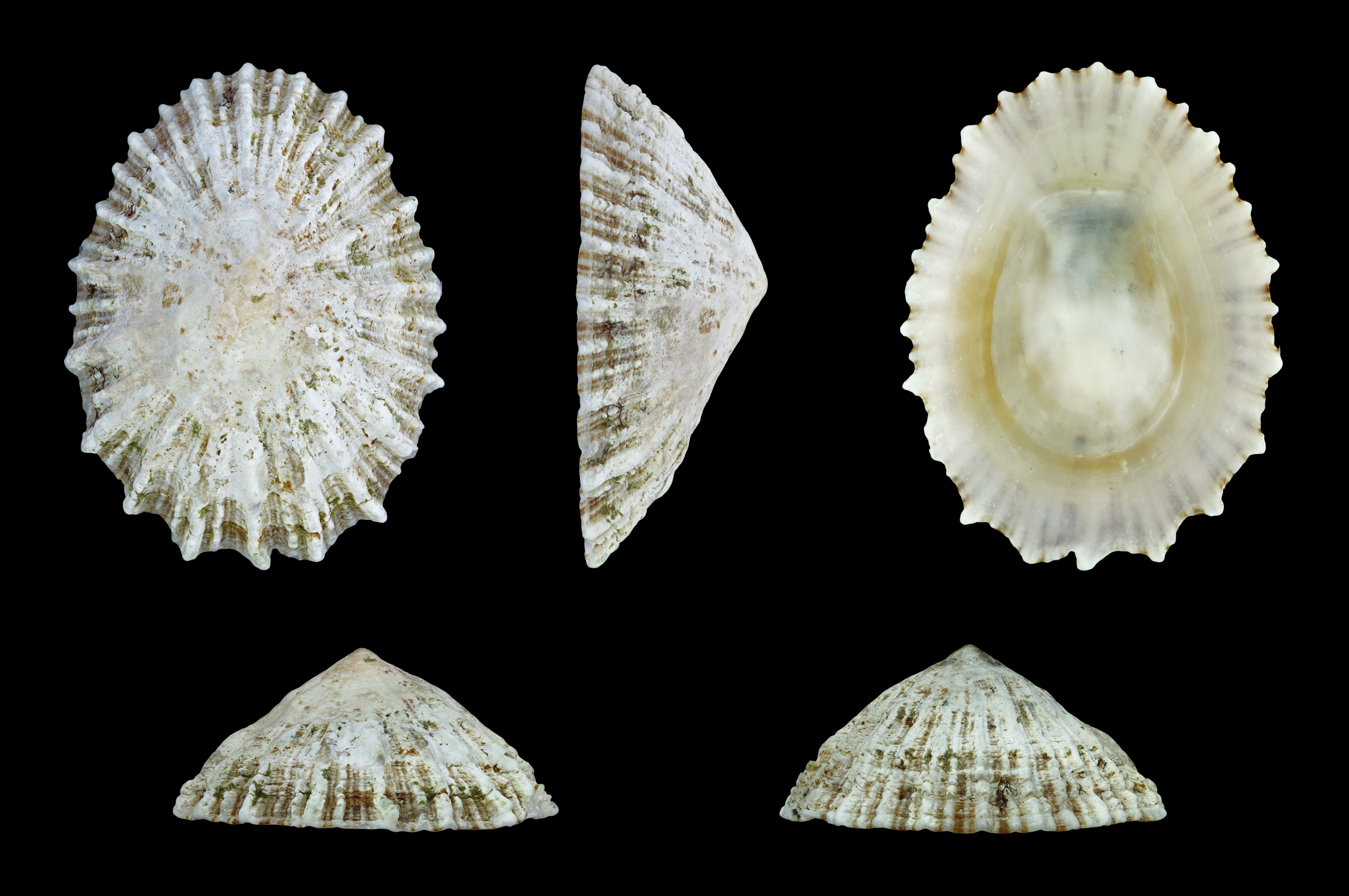

Scientific classification
- Kingdom: Animalia
- Phylum: Mollusca
- Class: Gastropoda
- Subclass: Patellogastropoda
- Family: Patellidae
- Genus: Patella
- Species: P. ulyssiponensis

Binomial name
- Patella ulyssiponensis Gmelin, 1791

Synonyms
- Patella aspera Lanarck, 1819; Patella athletica Bean, 1844 (junior synonym); Patella azorica Nuttal in Jay, 1852; Patella baudonii Drouet, 1858; Patella bonnardii Payraudeau, 1826; Patella caerulea var. tenuistriata Weinkauff, 1880; Patella donacina Anton, 1838; Patella listeri Monterosato, 1888; Patella lowei d'Orbigny, 1840; Patella orbignyana Nordsieck & Talavera, 1979 (dubious synonym); Patella paulinoi Locard, 1894; Patella pontica Valenciennes in Monterosato, 1888; Patella pontica Milaschewitsch, 1914; Patella repanda Gmelin, 1791; Patella spectabilis Dunker, 1853; Patella spinosula Meuschen, 1787; Patella spinulosa Mörch, 1853; Patella tarentina Salis Marschlins, 1793; Patella teneriffae Mabille, 1888 (dubious synonym); Patella ulyssiponensis deserta Christiaens, 1973; Patella vulgata var. albula de Gregorio, 1884; Patella vulgata var. cimbulata de Gregorio, 1884; Patella vulgata var. comina de Gregorio, 1884; Patella vulgata var. depressaspera de Gregorio, 1884

= Patella ulyssiponensis =

Species of gastropod

Patella ulyssiponensis, common name the rough limpet, or China limpet is a species of sea snail, a true limpet, a marine gastropod mollusk in the family Patellidae, one of the families of true limpets. Despite its common name, the China limpet is found throughout the Eastern North Atlantic and the Mediterranean.

Compared with the common limpet, Patella vulgata, the rough limpet has a similar shell (maximum size 50mm long x 40 mm wide x 20 mm high, apex closer to the front of the animal/ anterior than to the back/ posterior) but with radiating ridges that are finer and which alternate 1-ridge/ 3-ridges around the shell in a distinct pattern. The interior of the shell is often tinged orange towards its apex. The foot is a cream-orange color, and the dozens of pallial tentacles are translucent and colorless, arranged in two series of different sizes. No other characteristics of body structure or shell morphology distinguish it from P. vulgata, to which it is otherwise identical.

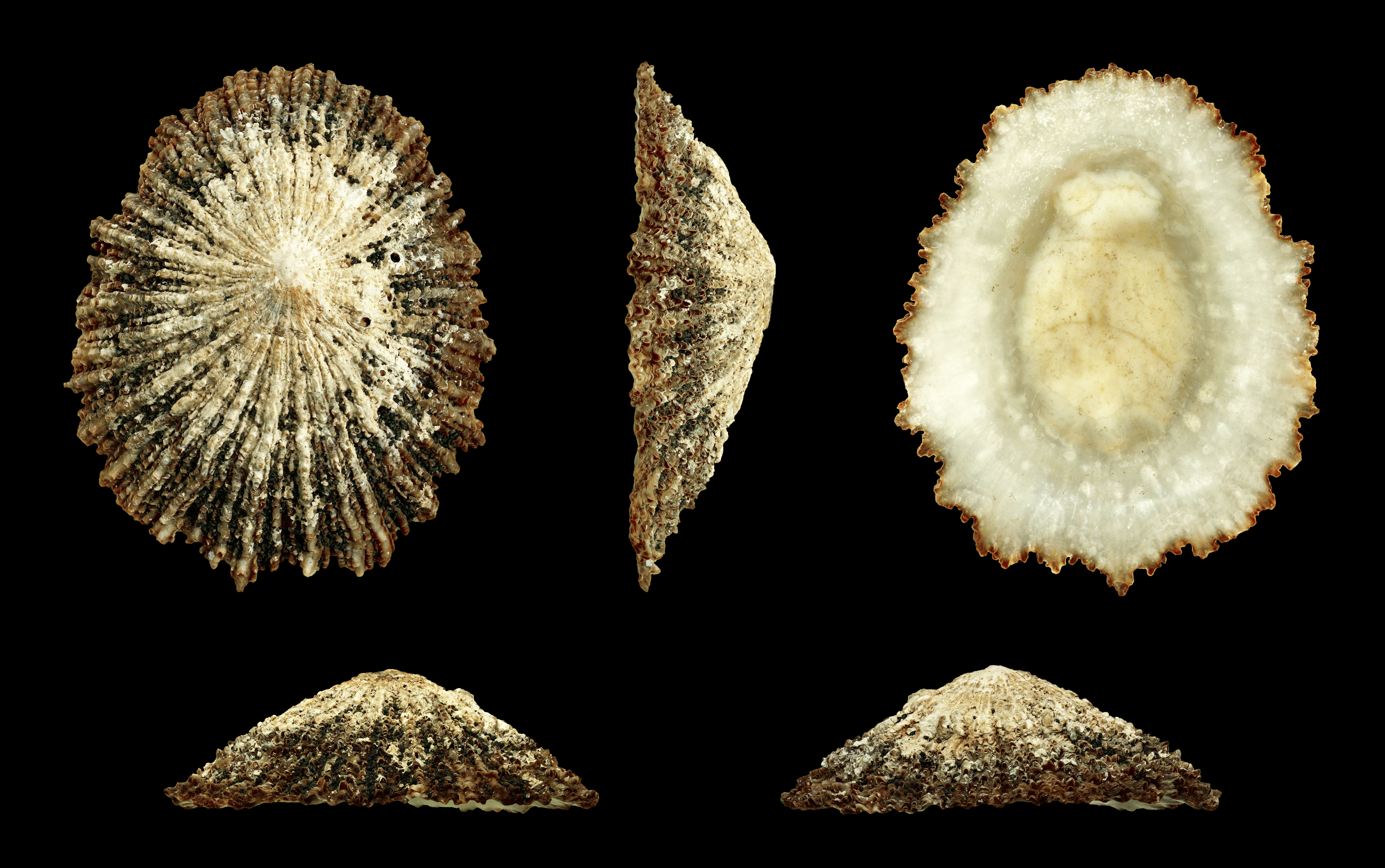
Patella ulyssiponensis f. tenerifeae

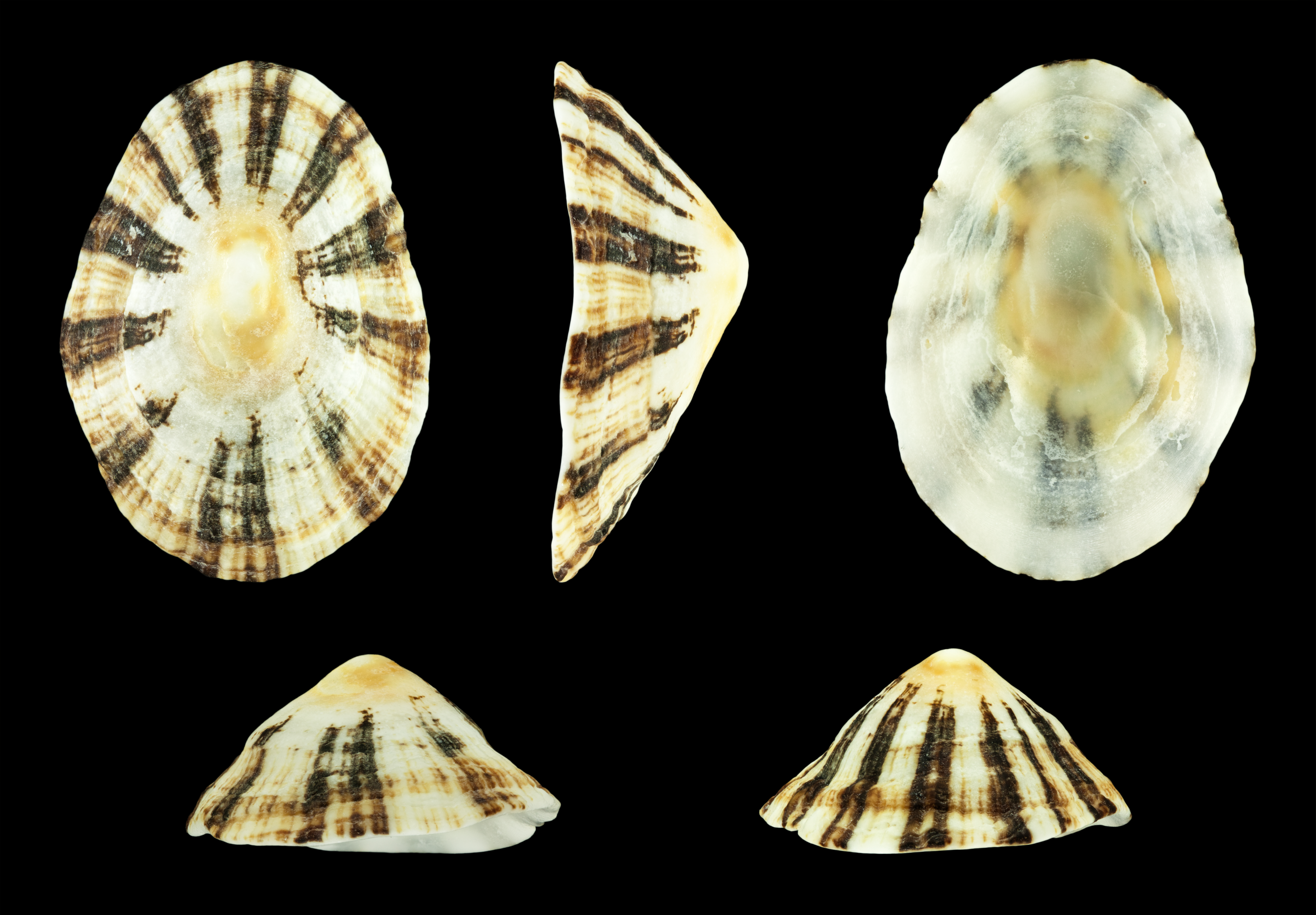
Patella ulyssiponensis f. athletica

== Etymology ==
Patella ulyssiponensis can be divided into the Latin words Patella, meaning "little pan", and ulyssiponensis, meaning "from Lisbon".

== Distribution ==
Patella ulyssiponensis is found in the European Atlantic area north to the North Sea and also in the Mediterranean.

== Uses ==
In Madeira Island in Portugal, Patella ulyssiponensis, known locally as Lapa, is eaten after cooking in a pan with garlic and lemon juice.
