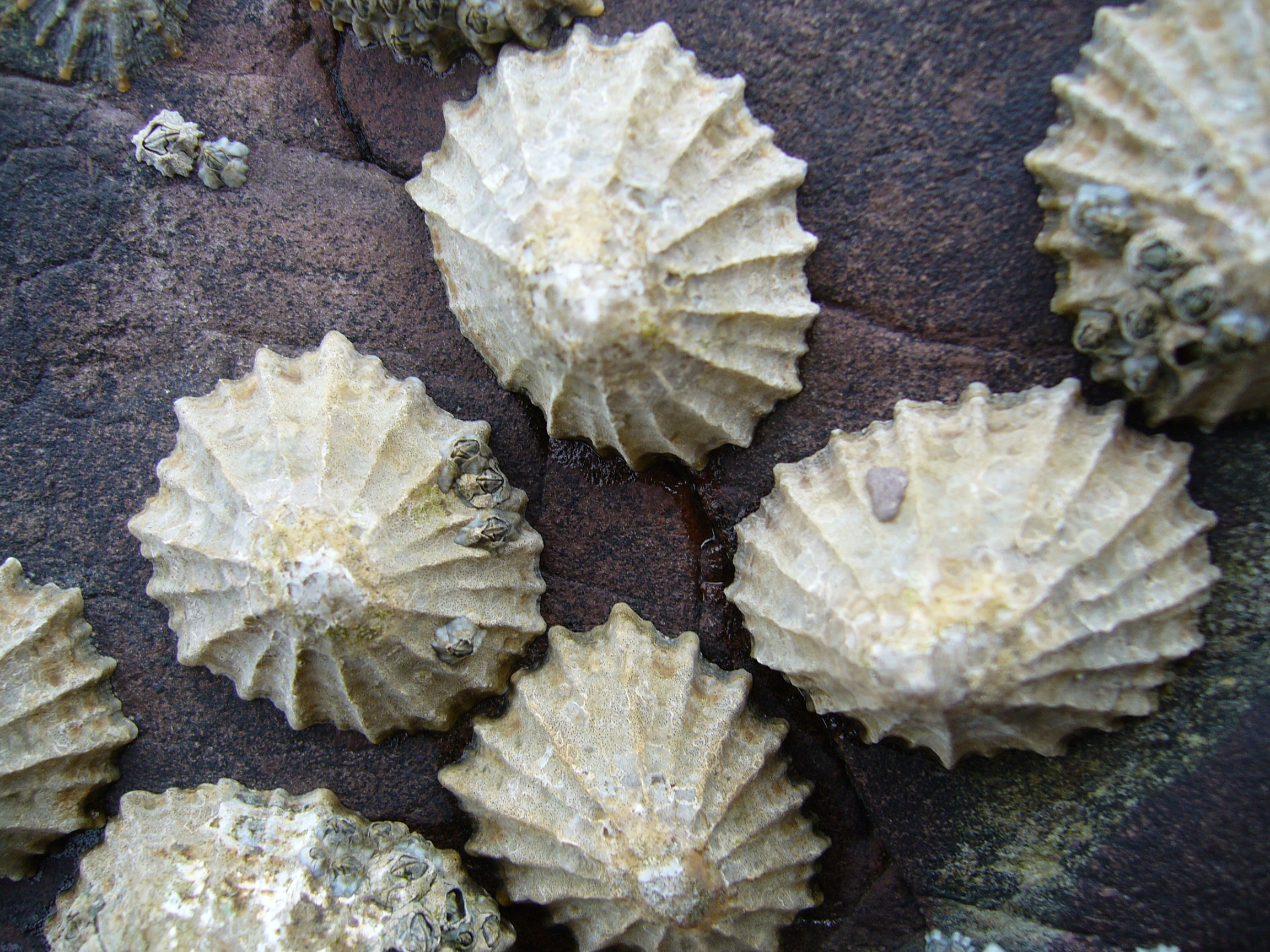
- Live Patella vulgata on a rock in Wales
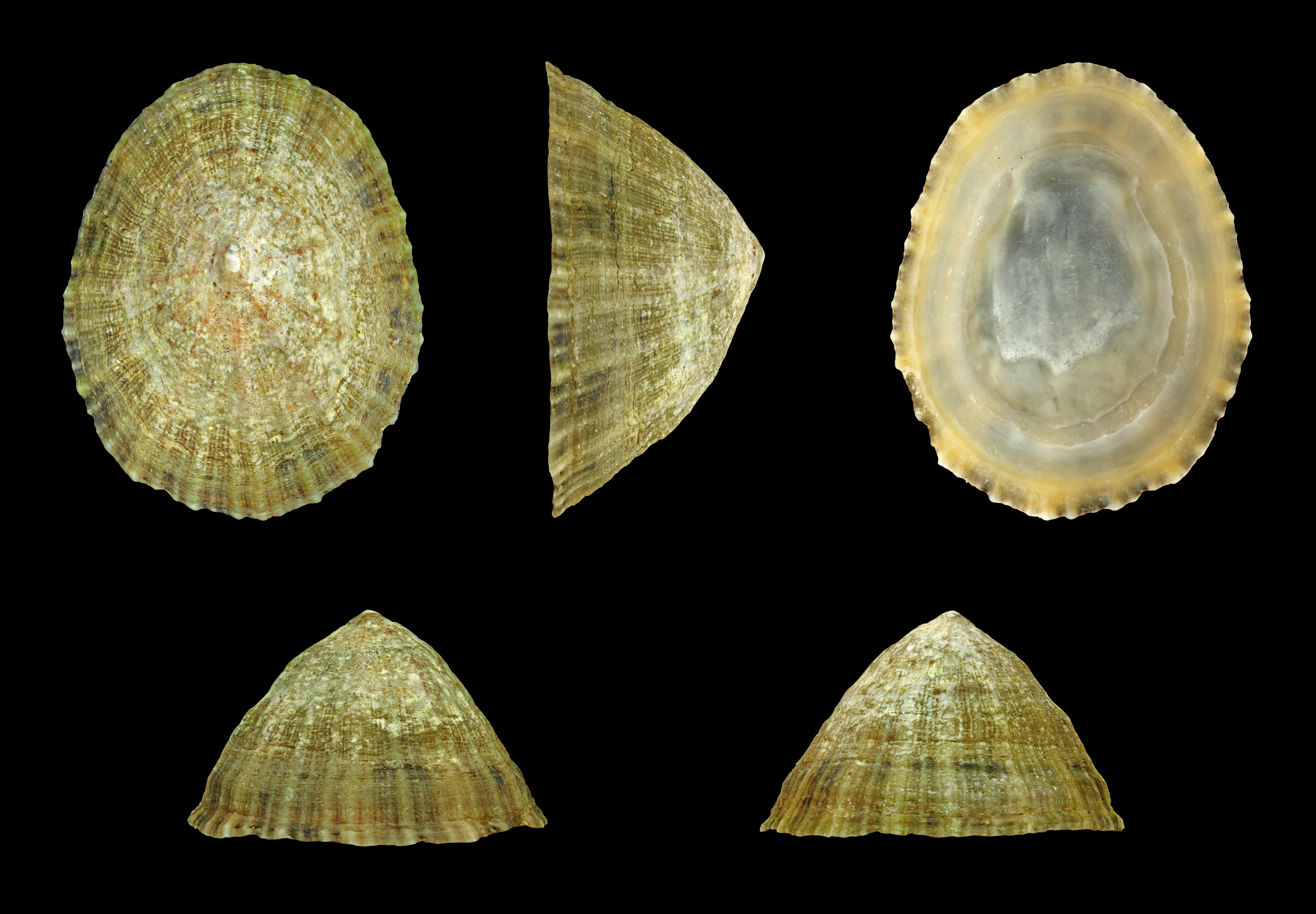
- Shell of Patella vulgata

Scientific classification
- Kingdom: Animalia
- Phylum: Mollusca
- Class: Gastropoda
- Subclass: Patellogastropoda
- Family: Patellidae
- Genus: Patella
- Species: P. vulgata

Binomial name
- Patella vulgata Linnaeus, 1758

Synonyms
- Patella conica Anton, 1838; Patella hypsilotera Locard, 1892; Patella radiata Perry, 1811; Patella vulgata var. aurea Dautzenberg & Durouchoux, 1906; Patella vulgata var. communis Brown, 1844; Patella vulgata var. elevata Jeffreys, 1865; Patella vulgata var. major Dautzenberg & Durouchoux, 1906; Patella vulgata var. secernenda Dautzenberg, 1887

= Patella vulgata =

Species of gastropod

Patella vulgata, common name the common limpet or common European limpet is a species of sea snail. It is a typical true limpet; a marine gastropod mollusc in the family Patellidae, with gills. This species occurs in the waters of Western Europe.

== Radula ==
The radula in this species is longer than the shell itself. It contains 1,920 teeth in 160 rows of 12 teeth each. Patella vulgata is found attached to firm substrates from the high shore to the edge of the sublittoral zone, although it predominates in areas of wave action. Its shell is conical, up to around 6 cm long, and lacks defined chirality. Common limpets are believed to be able to live for up to twenty years.

Patella vulgata has been the focus of a range of scientific investigation, as far back as 1935. Its development is well described and it has been the focus of transcriptomic investigation, providing a range of genomic sequence data in this species for analysis.

Their teeth are the strongest natural material known. A study published in the Royal Society journal in 2015 concluded that "the tensile strength of limpet teeth can reach values significantly higher than spider silk, considered to be currently the strongest biological material, and only comparable to the strongest commercial carbon fibres." The material was able to withstand 4.9 GPa. This considerable tensile strength of limpet teeth is attributed to a high mineral volume fraction of reinforcing goethite nanofibres.

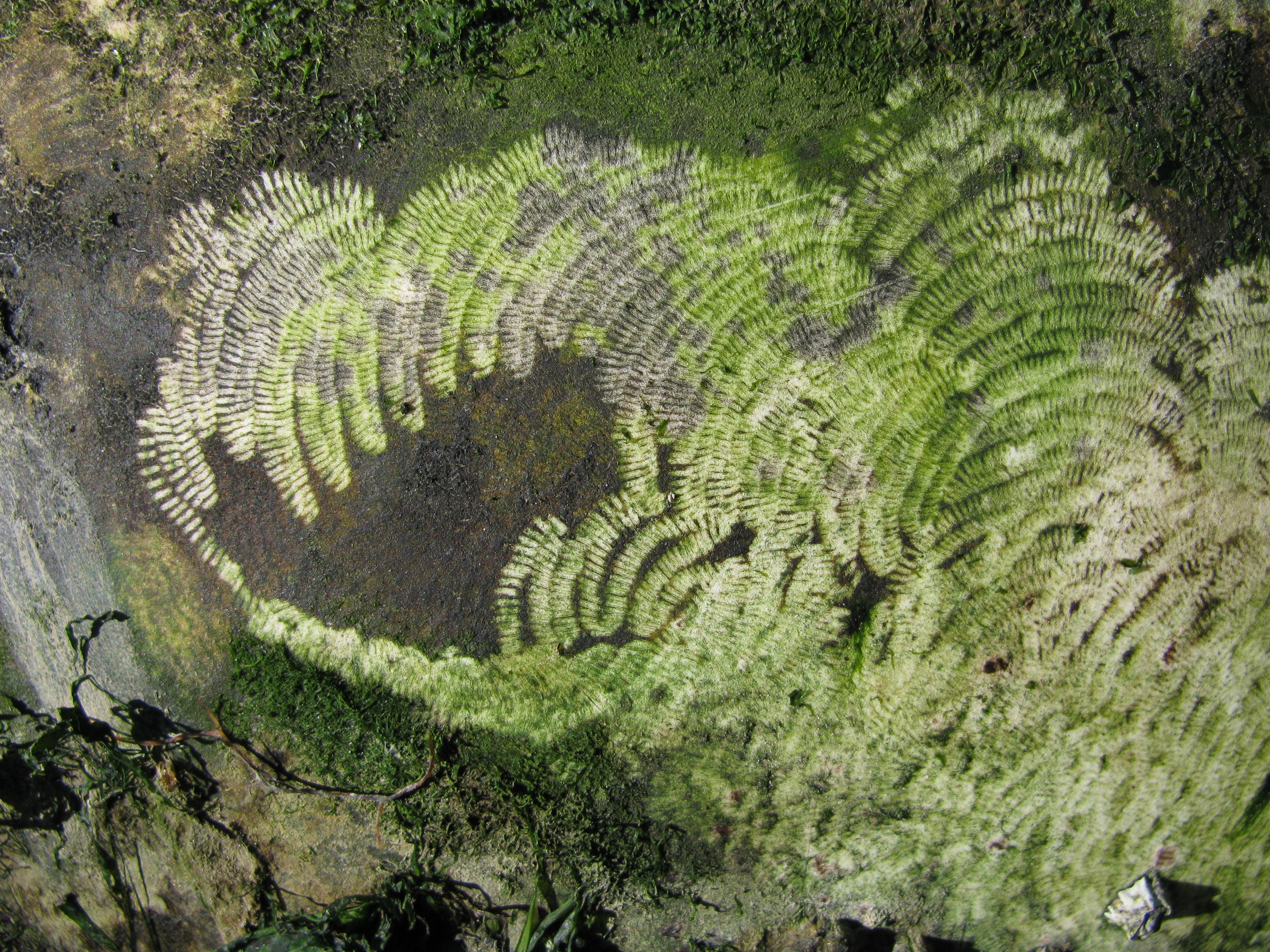
Patella browsing marks

== Human consumption ==
The common limpet was formerly eaten in Ireland, especially during times of hunger such as the Great Famine of 1845–50; it was known to be very tough and had to be thoroughly boiled or roasted to be edible. One Irish proverb said that "Mussels are the food of kings, limpets are the food of peasants." Tomas O'Crohan described eating them in his memoir The Islandman. They are also consumed in Asturias in Spain under the name "Llampares" and in Portugal under the name "Lapas".

== See also ==
- Limpet

== Gallery ==
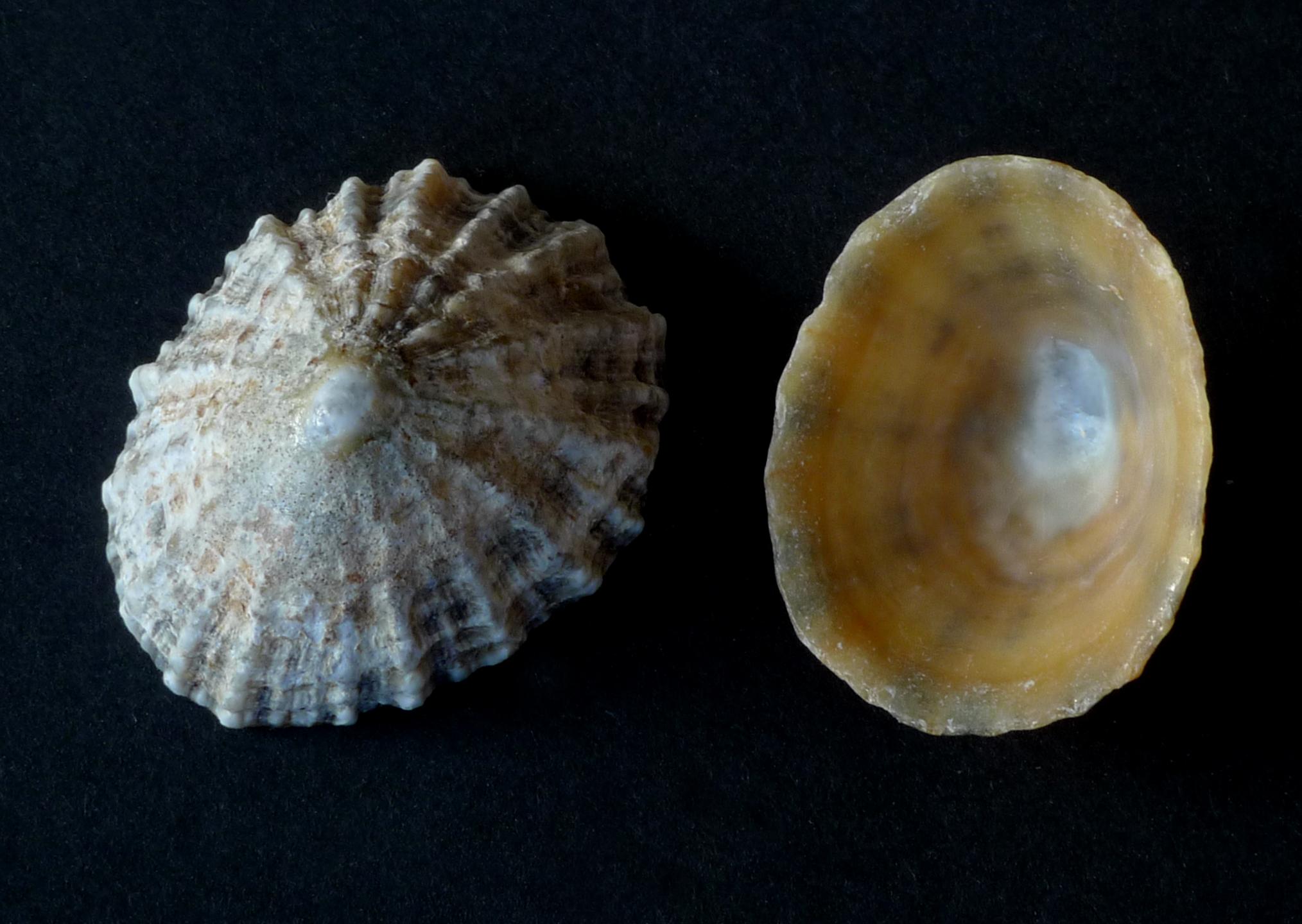
Shells of the common limpet from Wales

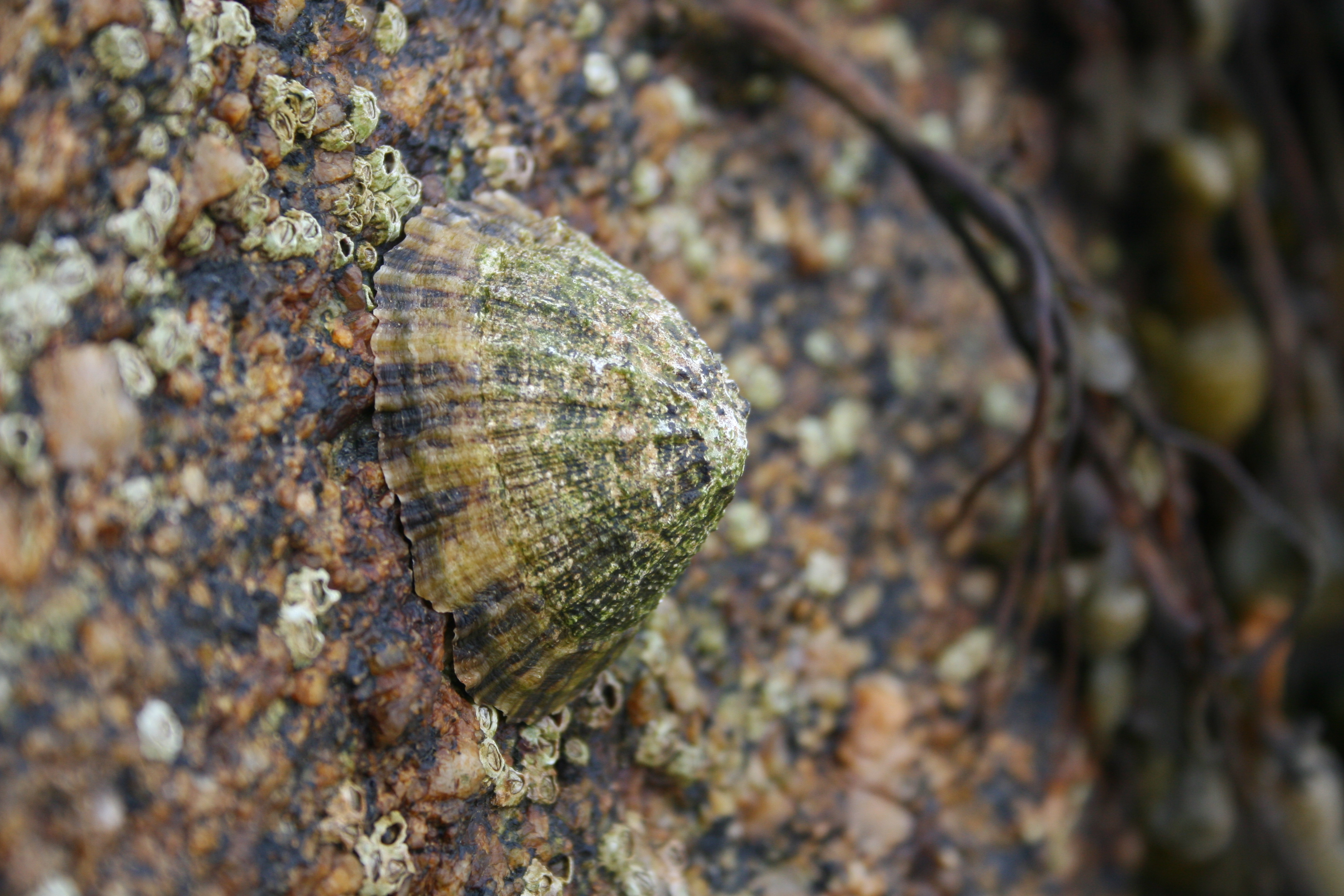
Patella vulgata in litoral of Finistère, near Porspoder - the region affected by the Amoco Cadiz tanker disaster in 1978

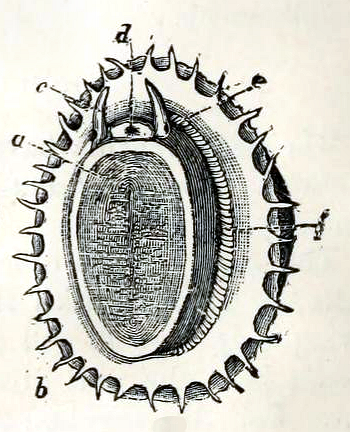
Drawing of the soft body and underside of the shell of Patella vulgata; a) foot b) fringed mantle c) tentacles d) mouth e) eyes f) gills

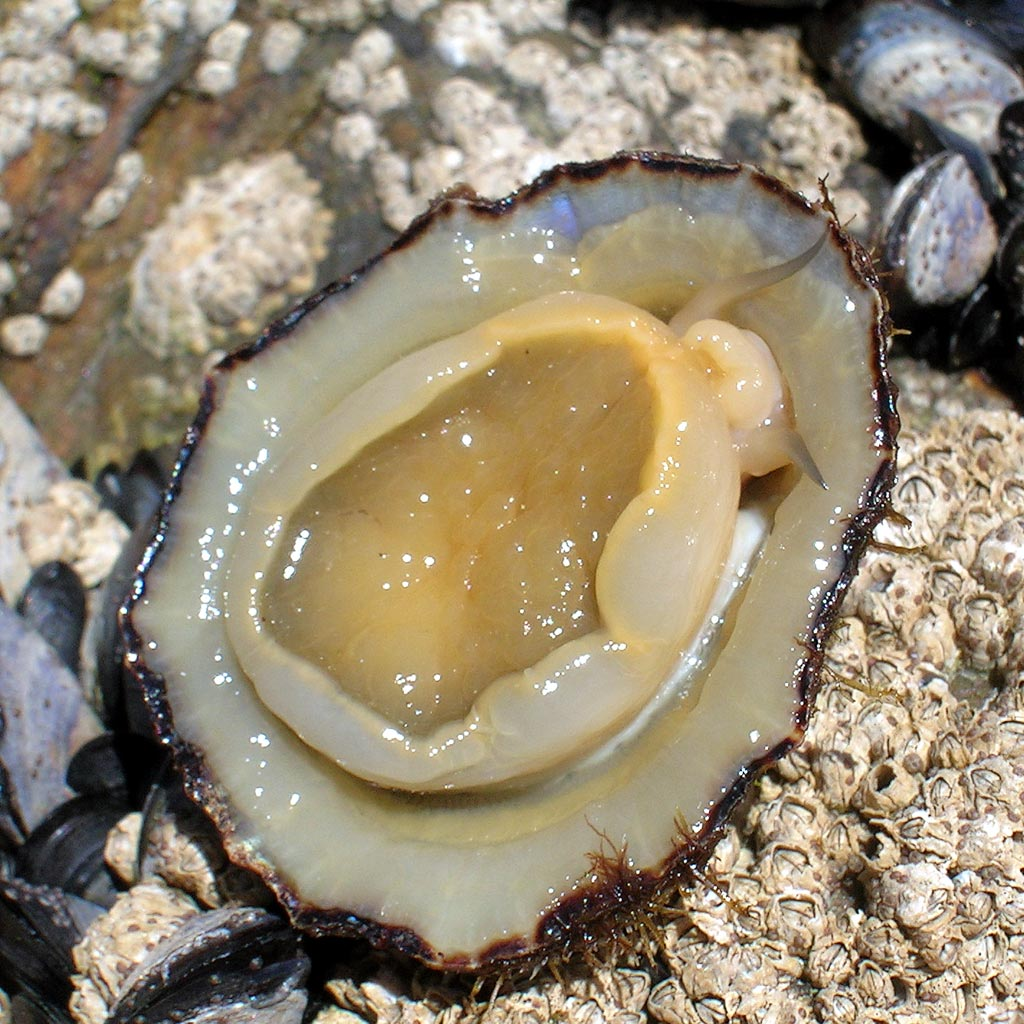
Photograph of the soft body and underside

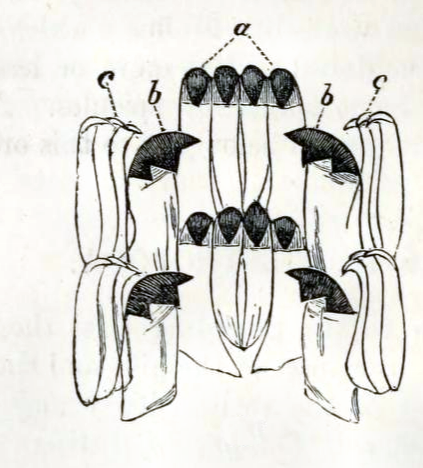
Radula of Patella vulgata; a) median teeth b) laterals c) uncini or marginals

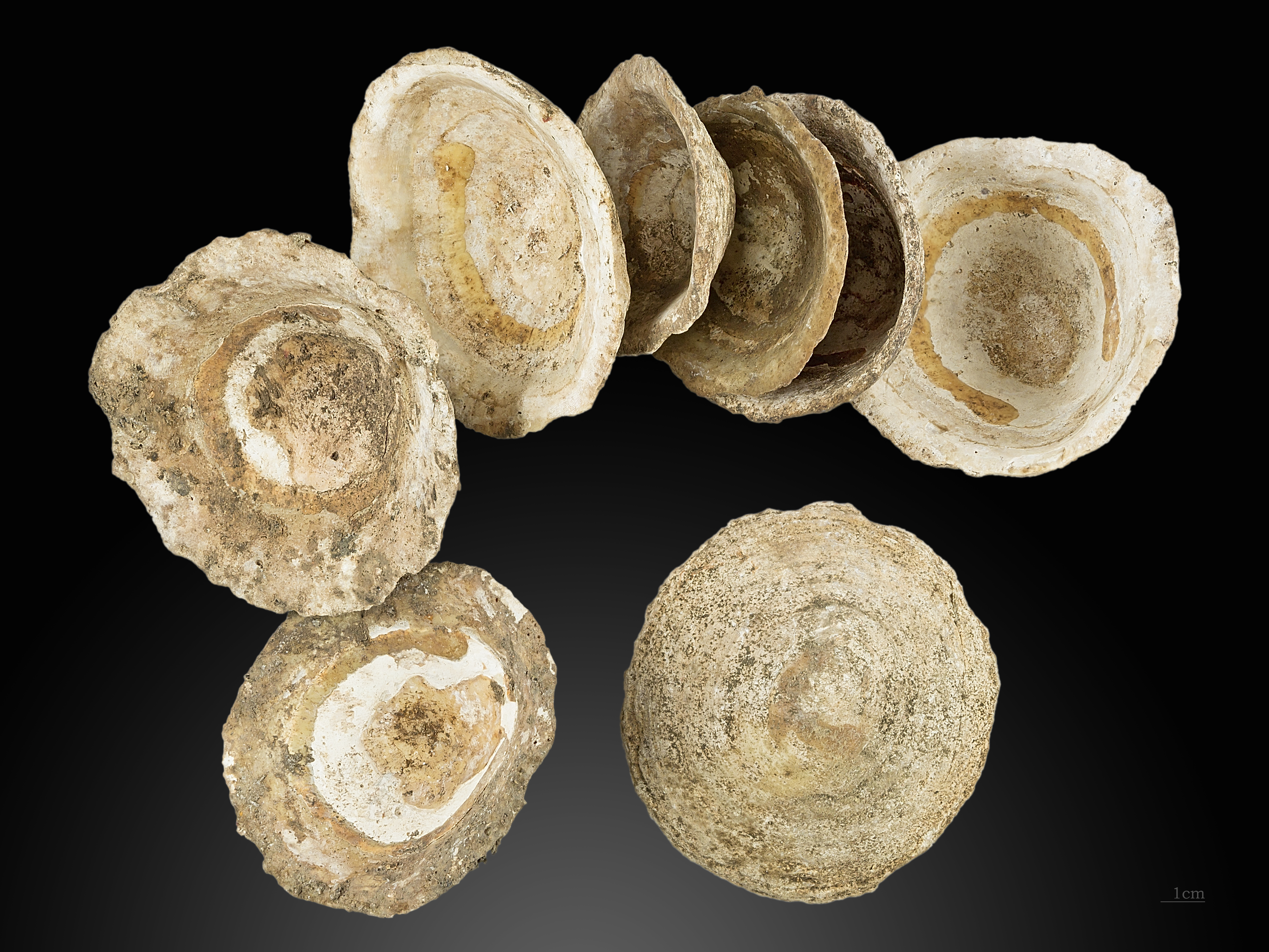
Remains of a human meal, limpet shells from Cantabrian Lower Magdalenian layer of the Altamira cave. - MHNT

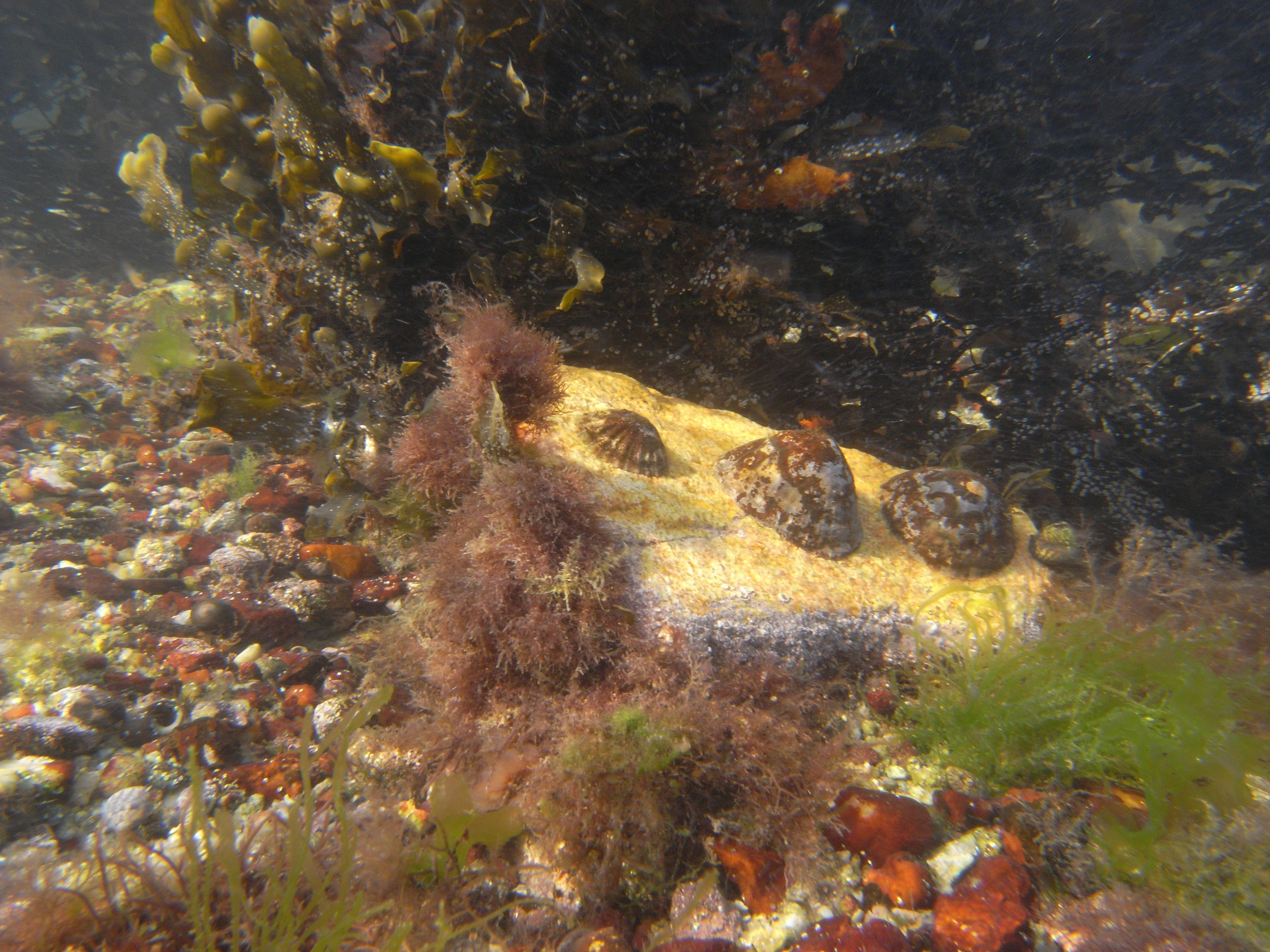
Patella vulgata in its natural habitat.
