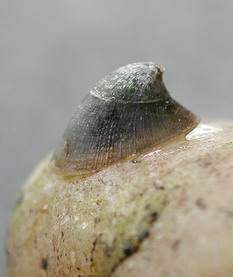
- A live individual of Ancylus fluviatilis, anterior end towards the left

Scientific classification
- Domain: Eukaryota
- Kingdom: Animalia
- Phylum: Mollusca
- Class: Gastropoda
- Superorder: Hygrophila
- Family: Planorbidae
- Subfamily: Ancylinae
- Tribe: Ancylini; Rafinesque, 1815

Genera
- See text

Synonyms
- Ancylidae; Pseudancylinae Walker, 1923 (inv.)

= Ancylini =

Tribe of gastropods

Ancylini is a tribe of small, freshwater, air-breathing limpets, aquatic pulmonate gastropod mollusks in the family Planorbidae, the ram's horn snails and their allies. This tribe used to be treated as a family; the current taxonomic placement within Planorbidae is according to the taxonomy of the Gastropoda (Bouchet & Rocroi, 2005).

== Anatomy ==
These animals have a pallial lung, as do all pulmonate snails, but they also have a false gill or "pseudobranch" which can serve perfectly well as a gill in situations where the limpet is unable to reach the surface for air, as is often the case.

== Genera ==
Genera in the tribe Ancylini include:

- Ancylus Müller, 1773 - type genus
- Pseudancylus
- Rhodocephala
- Ferrissia Walker, 1903
- Rhodacmea Walker, 1917
- Sineancylus Gutiérrez Gregoric, 2014
- Anisancylus Pilsbry & Vanatta, 1924
- Burnupia Walker, 1912
- Gundlachia Pfeiffer, 1849
- Hebetancylus Pilsbry, 1914
- Laevapex Walker, 1903
- Stimulator
- Uncancylus Pilsbry, 1913
