= Wildlife of Sudan =

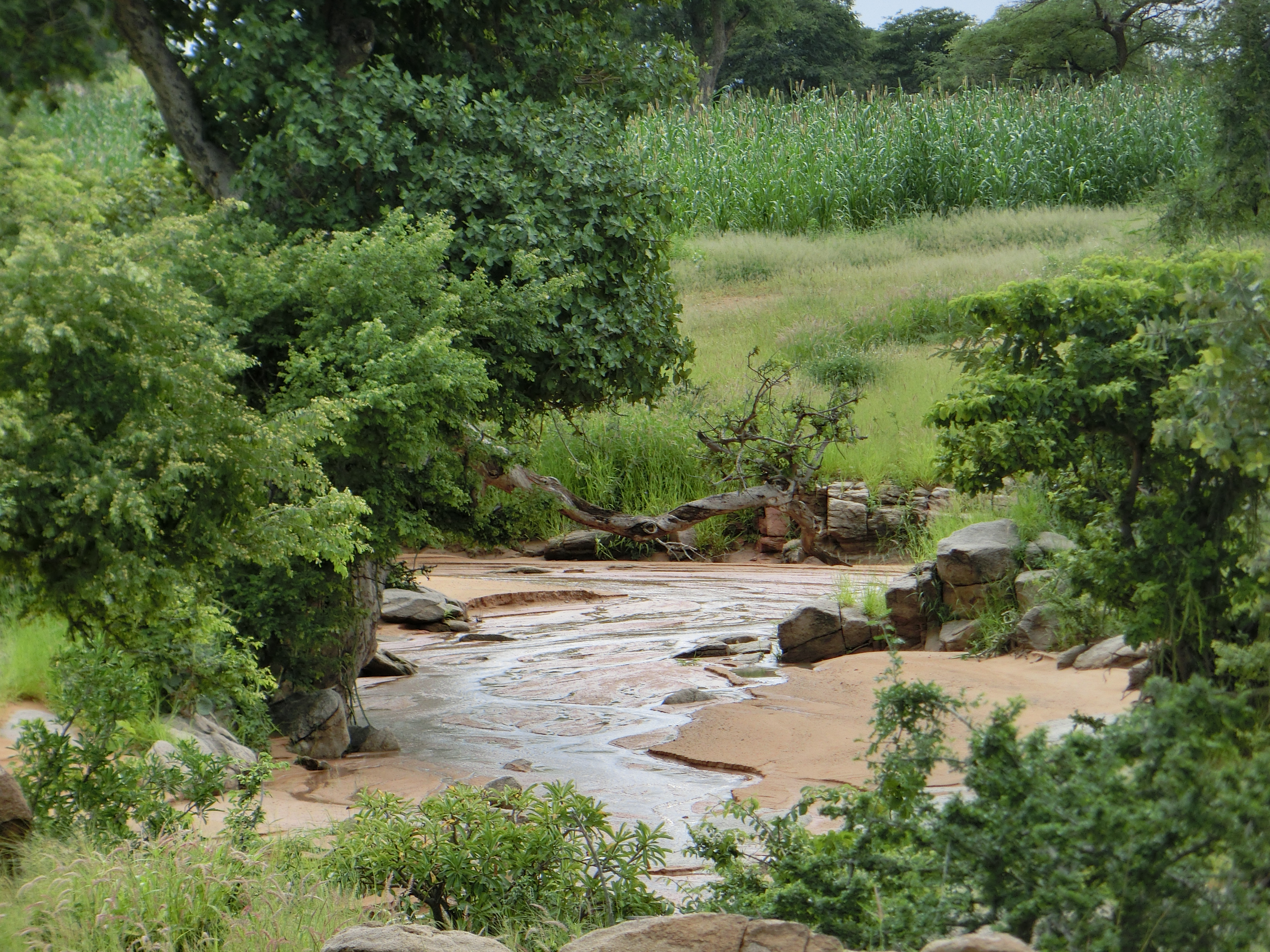
Wadi in South Darfur

The wildlife of Sudan is composed of its flora and fauna. A variety of climate types in Sudan results in a wide range of habitats and the range of wildlife is diverse. Some 287 species of mammal have been recorded in the country and some 634 species of bird.

== Geography ==
Sudan is located in northeastern Africa, with an 853 km (530 mi) coastline bordering on the Red Sea. The terrain is generally flat, with low-lying plains broken by a few mountain ranges. In the west, the Marrah Mountains are the highest part of Sudan, while in the east lie the Red Sea Hills. The Blue Nile and the White Nile converge at Khartoum to form the Nile, which flows northwards to the Mediterranean Sea. The climate ranges from hyper-arid in the north of the country to tropical wet-and-dry in the south. Variations in the length of the wet and dry seasons depend on which of two air flows predominates: dry northern winds from the Sahara and the Arabian Peninsula or moist southwesterly winds from the Congo River basin and southeasterly winds from the Indian Ocean. The wet season in the north occurs between June and September while it arrives earlier and lasts longer in the south. The temperature is high all year round, with the hottest weather occurring at the end of the dry season.

== Flora ==
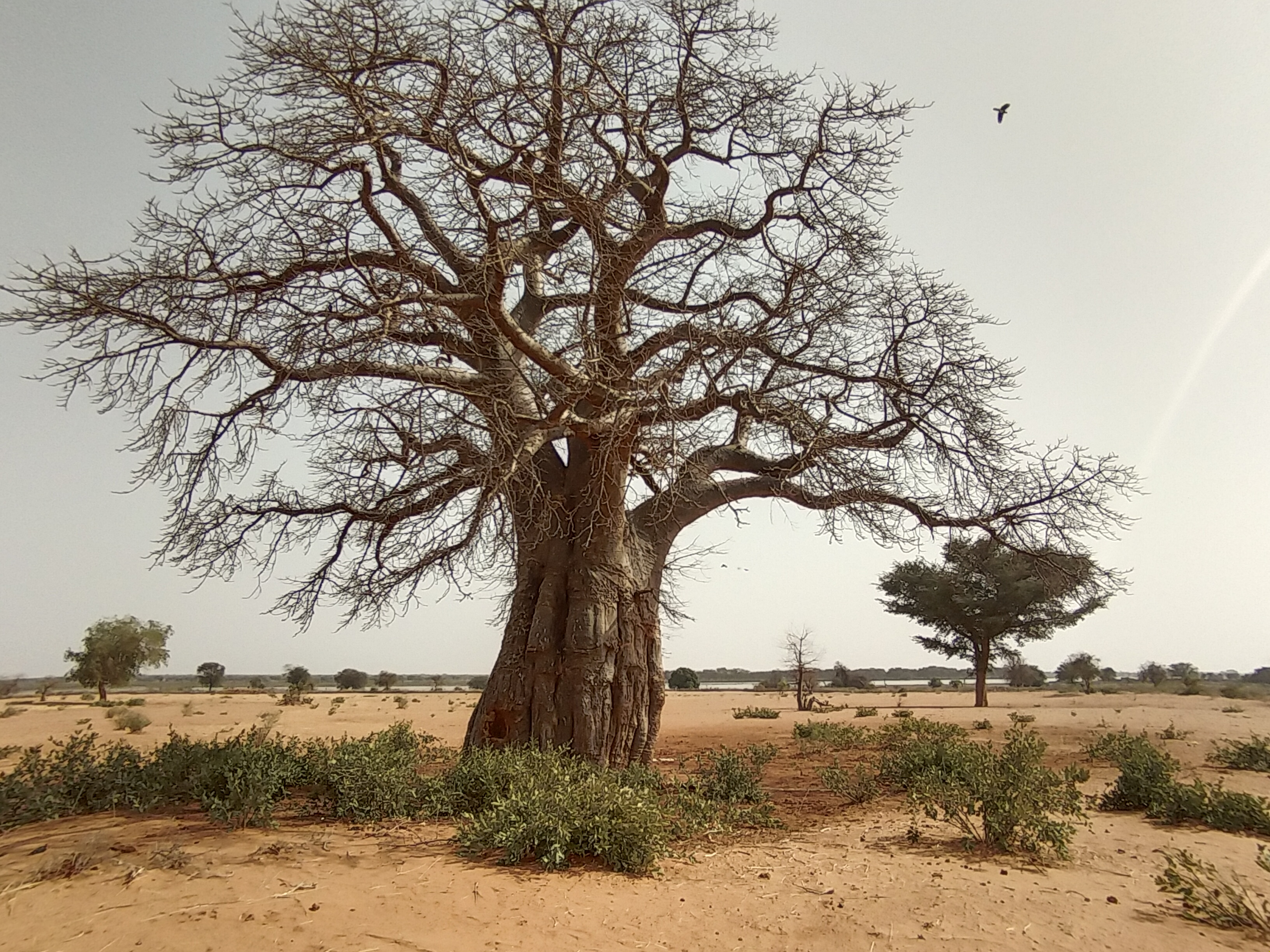
A baobab tree

The northern part of the country is largely desert with very little vegetation except beside watercourses. In more central parts, the semidesert receives rather more precipitation and supports Acacia scrub and various grasses. With the increased rainfall further south this merges into savannah with grasses, thorny trees and larger baobab trees. These are dominated by Acacia trees, including the Sudan gum (Acacia senegal) which yields gum arabic, historically one of the mainstays of the country's export trade. The Nile basin in the south receives more rainfall, and the grass is lush, providing grazing for herds of cattle. There are also patches of woodland here.

A characteristic tree which grows in woodland and beside seasonal water-courses in the Marrah Mountains is the winter thorn (Faidherbia albida). Cattle stand in its shade in the dry season eating shed leaves and fruits, and sorghum crops do well underneath it in the rainy season. An important species in arid and semi-arid regions is the umbrella thorn acacia (Vachellia tortilis).

The Sudd wetlands are a vast area of swamp in the south beside the White Nile. Here beds of reeds are interspersed by areas of aquatic vegetation including water hyacinth and papyrus, grasses and scrub.

== Fauna ==
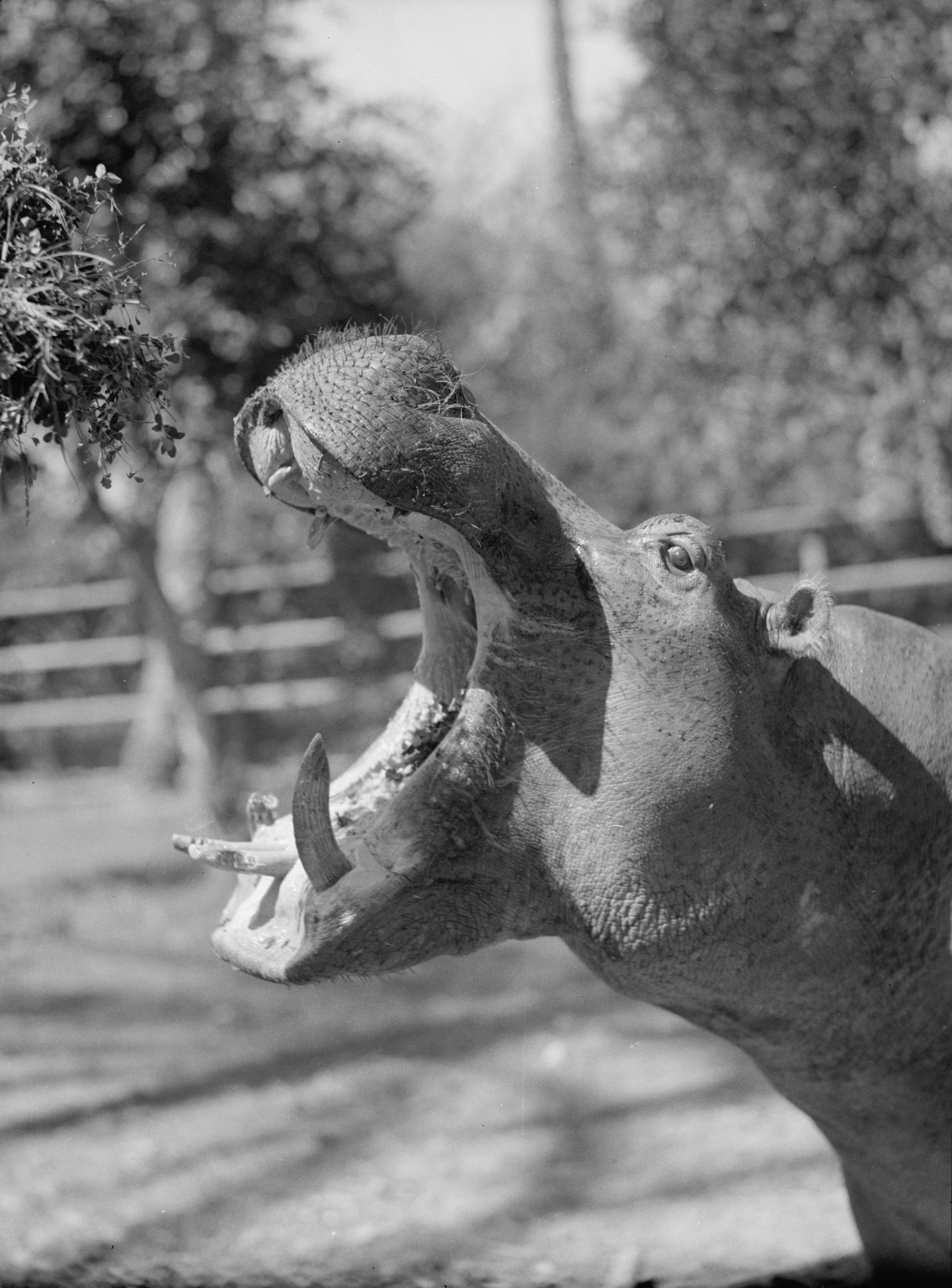
A hippo at the Khartoum Zoo

Most of the 287 or so species of mammal found in Sudan are small and nocturnal, being rodents, bats and insectivores. Elephant shrews also occur, and among the larger mammals are the crested porcupine and the rock hyrax. Big cats found in Sudan include lions, leopards and cheetahs. There are many species of antelope as well as giraffes, rhinoceroses and elephants, and monkeys are found in forested areas.

Reptiles are abundant but mostly small and inconspicuous. Snakes are numerous and include the African rock python, the black mamba, the Egyptian cobra, the forest cobra, the black-necked spitting cobra, the boomslang and the puff adder. Crocodiles are found near the Nile and other water bodies and there are many species of lizard, the largest being the Nile monitor. The African spurred tortoise and the leopard tortoise occur in arid areas and several aquatic species of terrapin, such as the African helmeted turtle, occur in swamps and marshes.

Among the 19 genera of amphibians found in Sudan there is one endemic species of frog.

634 species of bird have been recorded in Sudan. These include waterfowl and wading birds, raptors, game birds, seabirds, songbirds, swifts, cuckoos and nighthawks. Some are resident species, present all year round, or breeding birds that rear their young in the country. Others are over-wintering birds, avoiding harsher weather conditions elsewhere, or migrant species that are just passing through. The Kordofan sparrow (Passer cordofanicus) is endemic to Sudan and South Sudan.

Insects are abundant in great variety and tsetse flies occur south of latitude 12° north.

== Protection ==
The main legislation governing wildlife is the Preservation of Wild Animals Act of 1935. This regulates hunting and trade and lists protected species. Game and wildlife tourism includes hunting for Eritrean gazelles, Nubian ibex and baboons in the area between the Nubian Desert and the Red Sea Hills. In the Western Desert, Barbary sheep, Arabian oryx, ostriches and red-fronted gazelles are also hunted, as well as ducks, guineafowl, bustards and doves. Overhunting, loss of habitat, and a lack of enforcement of regulations has led to a decline in populations and biodiversity. In 2015, the United Nations reported that 123 species in the country were listed as "threatened".

Among several protected areas in Sudan are Radom National Park in South Darfur, in the southwest of the country, and Dinder National Park in the southeast, both of which are UNESCO biosphere reserves. There are also a number of game reserves. The Suakin Archipelago National Park is a cluster of islands off the coast in the Red Sea and is a marine protected area of 579 square miles. These islets are fringed by coral reefs, being visited by four species of turtle and home to five species of breeding bird.

== See also ==
- List of fauna of Sudan and South Sudan
