= Wildlife of Eritrea =

The wildlife of Eritrea is composed of its flora and fauna. Eritrea has 96 species of mammals and a rich avifauna of 566 species of birds.
