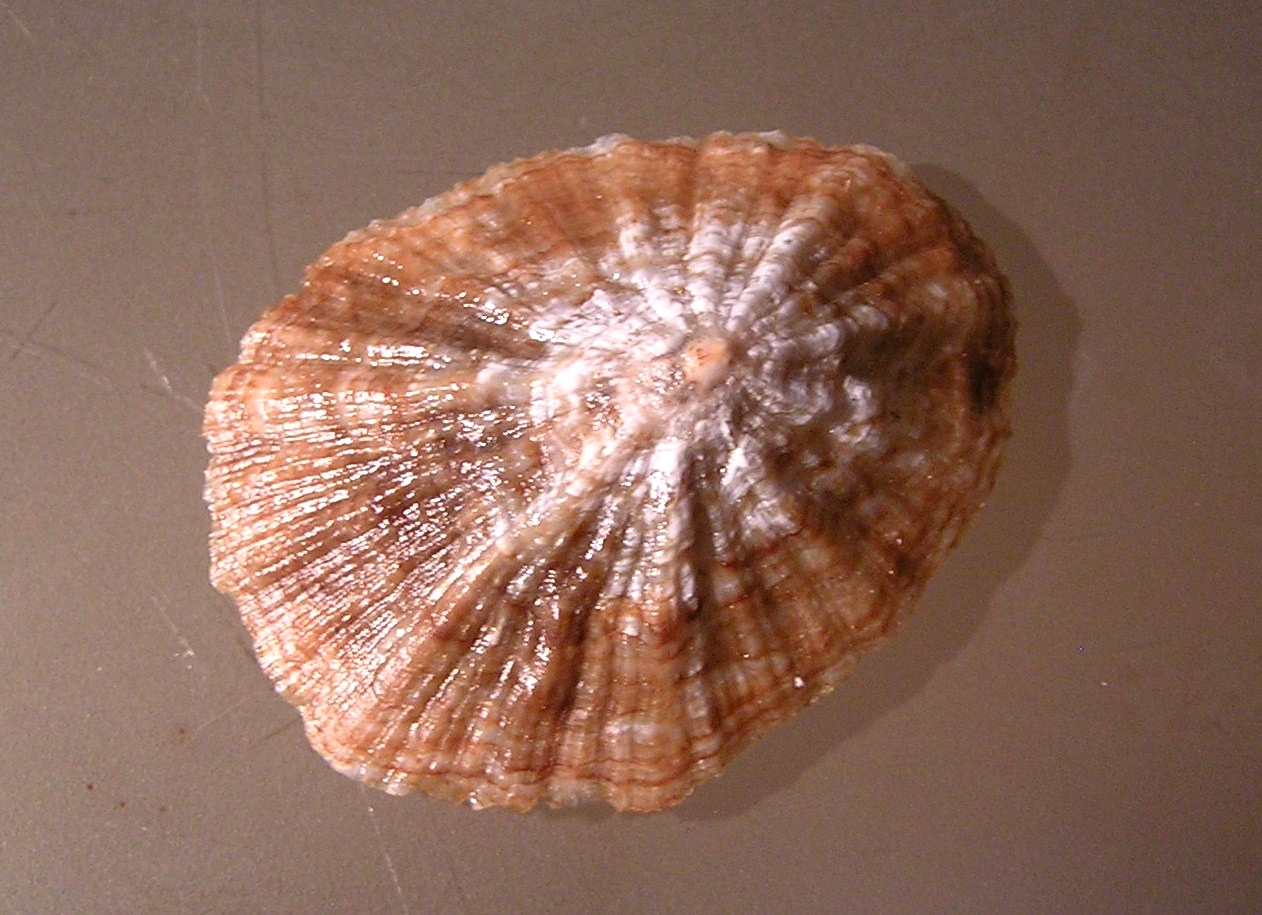
- Patella candei shell

Scientific classification
- Kingdom: Animalia
- Phylum: Mollusca
- Class: Gastropoda
- Subclass: Patellogastropoda
- Family: Patellidae
- Genus: Patella
- Species: P. candei

Binomial name
- Patella candei d'Orbigny, 1840

Synonyms
- Patella aspera var. simrothi von Martens, 1888; Patella chlorosticta Gmelin, 1791; Patella citrullus Gould, 1846; Patella gomesii Drouet, 1858; Patella moreleti Drouet, 1858; Patella ordinaria Mabille, 1888; Patella saxea F. Nordsieck, 1975; Patella teneriffae Mabille, 1888; Patella tenuis Gmelin, 1791; Patella tenuissima Turton, 1802

= Patella candei =

Species of gastropod

Patella candei, also known as the sun limpet, is a species of sea snail, a true limpet, a marine gastropod mollusk in the family Patellidae, one of the families of true limpets.

== Description ==
The naturalist Alcide d'Orbigny named the gastropod after Ferdinand de Candé.

The size of the shell varies between 20 mm and 80 mm.

== Distribution ==
This species occurs in the Atlantic Ocean off the Azores, Canary Islands, Madeira and the Savage Islands.

== Human use ==
Both Patella candei and Patella aspera are harvested for human use, mainly in the Portuguese Autonomous Regions of the Azores and Madeira. They are primarily eaten grilled with butter and garlic as the delicacy Lapas grelhadas (grilled limpets).

== See also ==
- Portuguese cuisine
- Patella candei
