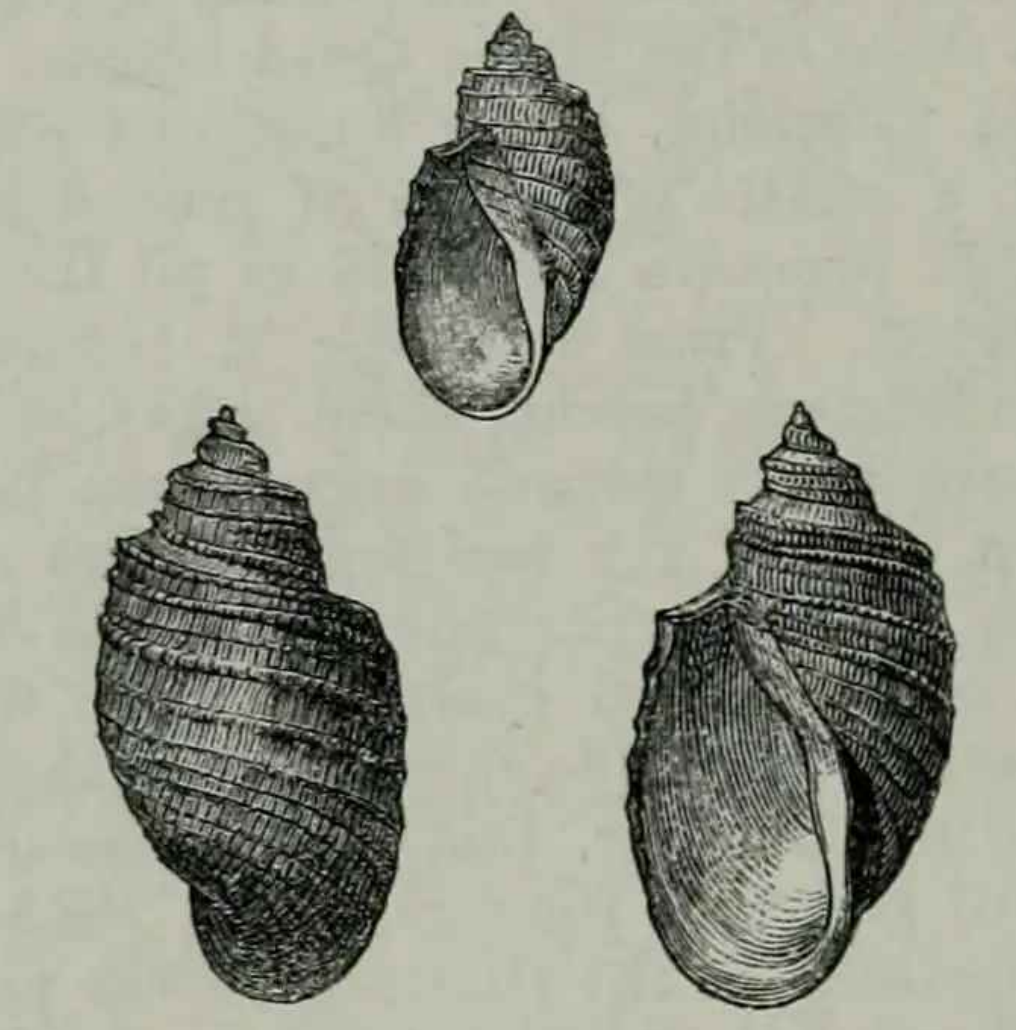
- Illustration from Reeve's 1862 description

Conservation status
- Least Concern (IUCN 3.1)

Scientific classification
- Kingdom: Animalia
- Phylum: Mollusca
- Class: Gastropoda
- Superorder: Hygrophila
- Family: Planorbidae
- Genus: Glyptophysa
- Species: G. aliciae

Binomial name
- Glyptophysa aliciae (Reeve, 1862)

Synonyms
- Glyptamoda aliciae (Reeve, 1862); Glyptamoda aliciae interna Iredale, 1944; junior subjective synonym; Glyptophysa (Glyptophysa) aliciae (Reeve, 1862); alternative representation; Physa (Ameria) aliciae Reeve, 1862; original combination; Physa cingulata Clessin, 1886; junior synonym

= Glyptophysa aliciae =

Species of mollusc

Glyptophysa aliciae, also known as the keeled pond snail or Alice's Physa, is a medium-sized species of freshwater snail in the family Planorbidae. It is named after Alicia, the daughter of the naturalist George French Angas. This species is endemic to southeast Australia, including South Australia and New South Wales. It may live in many kinds of freshwater environments along the coast or inland, including ponds with slightly salty water. This species displays characteristic ridges along the shell's surface, distinguishing it from other species in the genus.

== Taxonomy ==
The first specimen of Glytophysa aliciae was discovered by the species' namesake, Alicia, the daughter of George French Angas. It was found in the lower Murray River in South Australia. In 1862, Lovell Augustus Reeve described the species, placing it into what is now the genus Amerianna. In 1943, the species was moved to the now defunct genus Glyptamoda, and named the type species. One year later, the subspecies Glyptamoda aliciae interna was named, which is no longer considered valid. In 1988, the genus Glyptamoda was merged with Glyptophysa, though this snail was referred to as Glyptophysa aliciae prior to this.

At least one other new species has been described that is actually synonymous with G. aliciae: Physa cingulata, which was found to be synonymous in 1943. Other sources provide more synonyms, including Physa kershawi, Glyptamoda ellea, Bulinus aliciae, and Glyptamoda orta, among others. In addition to these synonyms, G. aliciae itself has been hypothesized to be synonymous with Glyptophysa petiti.

Five type specimens are known, all of which are syntypes (specimens used to describe a species). Four are in the collections of the Australian Museum in Sydney, while the final, oldest specimen (from Reeve's description) is housed at the Natural History Museum in London.

== Description ==
Glyptophysa aliciae has a wide, oblong, oval-shaped shell measuring 7 mm (0.28 in) in length and 4.8 mm (0.19 in) in width. Some specimens have been recorded as large as 18 mm (0.71 in) by 10 mm (0.39 in). The color of the shell has been variously described as reddish, yellow, brown, or white with a straw-colored outer layer (periostracum). The periostracum has not been observed to form a fringe, as it does in Bayardella cosmeta. This species has three, four, or five left-coiling shell revolutions (whorls), and a slightly raised, sharply pointed spire (a structure formed from stacks of whorls). The spire's length is described as being between one fifth and one sixth the total length of the shell. The shell is decorated with a sculpture of thin raised ridges that run in the direction of its coiling. The ridges become less pronounced but denser towards the front of the shell. Additionally, growth lines intersect these ridges at a perpendicular angle. Some sources report that these ridges may be less prominent on some specimens. The shell opening (aperture) of the shell is long and somewhat oval-shaped, though it also has an angled shoulder, similar to the genus Amerianna. Many sources describe that the internal pillar of the shell (columella) is folded to produce a structure called a plait, though one source did not find this folding to be present.

The presence of ridges and an angled shoulder are unique traits among the genus Glyptophysa, distinguishing this species from all others. The ridges are, however, similar to the genus Bayardella, but this species may still be distinguished by a number of characteristics, including the wider spire, angled shoulder, lack of a periostracal fringe, and lack of strong axial ribs.

The rachidian tooth (left) and first lateral tooth (right)

The radula (tongue-like organ) has 65 teeth per row; one central (rachidian) tooth bordered on each side by seven lateral teeth and 25 marginal teeth.

== Distribution and habitat ==
Glyptophysa aliciae is endemic to a large area of southeast Australia, occupying an estimated area of about 757,000 km^{2} (292,000 mi^{2}). Its range includes both South Australia and New South Wales, where it may overlap with national parks and reserves. It lives in fresh water along the coast of the states, and has further been recorded in the Murray-Darling basin. Specific occurrences come from the lower Murray River, Cooper Creek, the Paroo Lakes in New South Wales, and salt lakes in Victoria, Australia.

This species occupies both fast-moving (lotic) and slow-flowing (lentic) waters, most often in permanent bodies of water. It has been found attached to aquatic vegetation, underneath rocks, and on fallen leaves and wood, typically hiding in cracks. G. aliciae has additionally been found to inhabit irrigation pipes alongside the mollusks Corbicula australis, Gabbia vertiginosa, Plotiopsis balonnensis, and species of Ferrissia. This snail has a relatively high salinity tolerance, being found in waters with up to 9g/L of dissolved salt. In the laboratory, eggs from this species only hatched in water with an electrical conductivity between 1 and 6 mS/cm. Juveniles survived up to 15 mS/cm, with an LC_{50} of 9 to 12.6 mS/cm. Despite this, increasing salinity in the area may threaten populations. Additional stressors include climate change and the mismanagement of water resources.

Unlike Bayardella cosmeta, this snail is very active, and extends its body far outside its shell while crawling. This snail is consumed by several species of birds, including the Australian pelican, musk duck, and white-faced heron, with some evidence of additionally being consumed by the spur-winged plover, black swan, and mountain duck.
