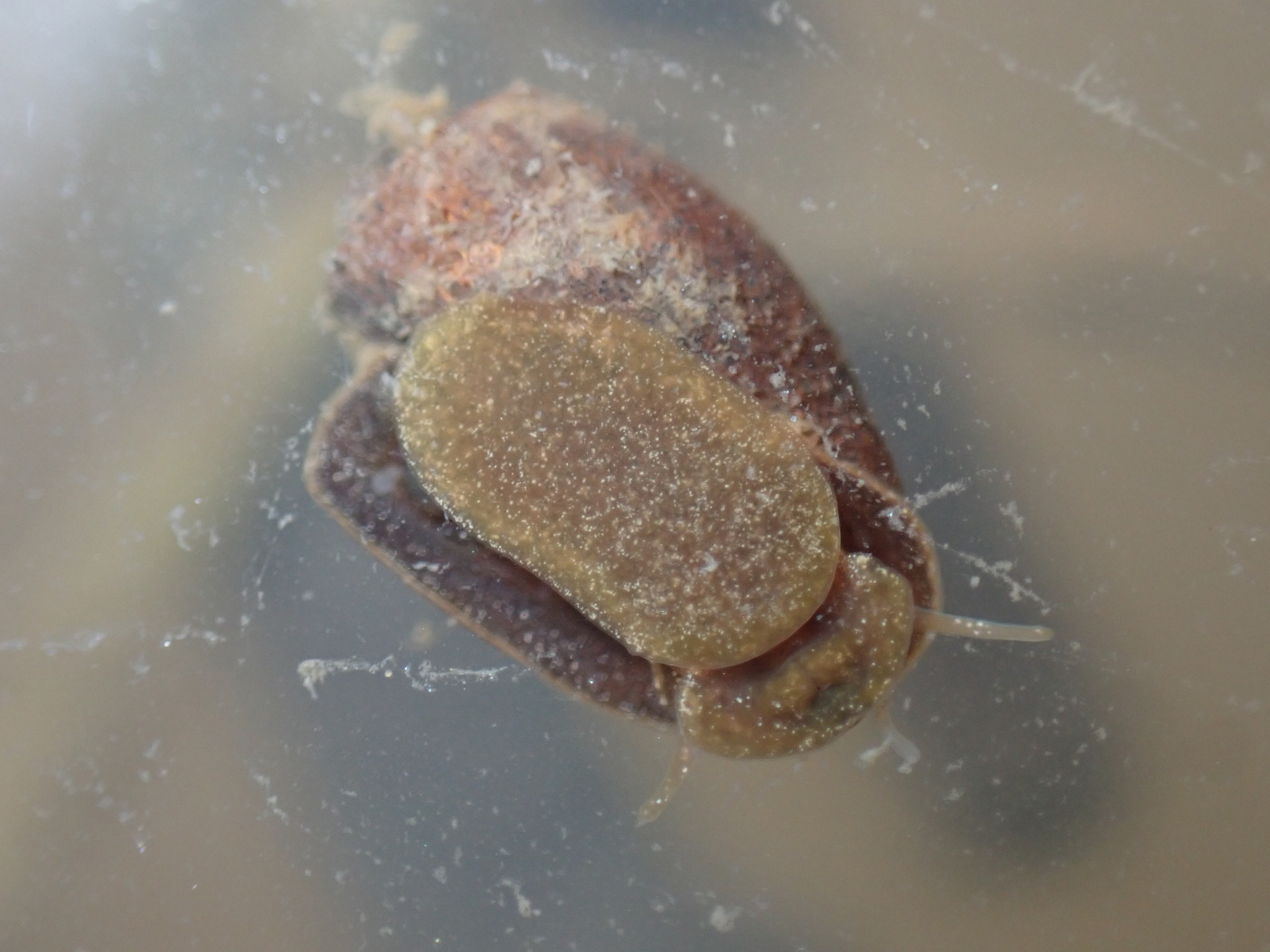

Scientific classification
- Kingdom: Animalia
- Phylum: Mollusca
- Class: Gastropoda
- Superorder: Hygrophila
- Family: Planorbidae
- Genus: Amerianna
- Species: A. compar

Binomial name
- Amerianna compar Iredale, 1943

= Amerianna compar =

Species of gastropod

Amerianna compar is a small species of freshwater snail in the family Planorbidae. It is found across a large region of Australia, where it is common amongst rocks, wood, and aquatic vegetation.

== Taxonomy ==
Amerianna compar was first described in 1943 by Tom Iredale from specimens collected in the Lennard River in Kimberley, Western Australia.

It is sometimes considered to be synonymous with Amerianna carinata.

== Description ==
The shell of Amerianna compar is 7 mm (0.28 in) in height, and 5.5 mm (0.22 in) wide. The shell opening (aperture) measures 6.5 by 3.5 mm (0.26 by 0.14 in), and the walls of the shell are notably thin. The shell is reddish-tan in color. The whorls (shell revolutions) are sharply angled and possess an inconspicuous keel (carina). The whorls stack to form a spire at the back of the shell, with a characteristic "stepped" appearance. The body whorl is not on the same plane as the other whorls.

This species may be distinguished from Amerianna obesula by the flat backside of the shell, which in this species, displays small raised lines that run parallel to the coiling of the shell. It is smaller than Amerianna carinata.

== Distribution and habitat ==
Amerianna compar inhabits streams, ponds, man-made structures like potholes, and temporary pools of fresh water. It is common across a large area in Australia, including Western Australia, the Northern Territory, Queensland, and the north of New South Wales. In Western Australia, specific occurrences have been recorded in the Lennard River, and in the Northern Territory, sightings have occurred in Leach Lagoon near Katherine, the Reynold River, as well as billabongs around Litchfield Station, Douglas Daly Research Farm, and Fish River Station.

The species lives on a variety of substrates, including rocks, wood, and aquatic vegetation (especially Pandanus aquaticus).
