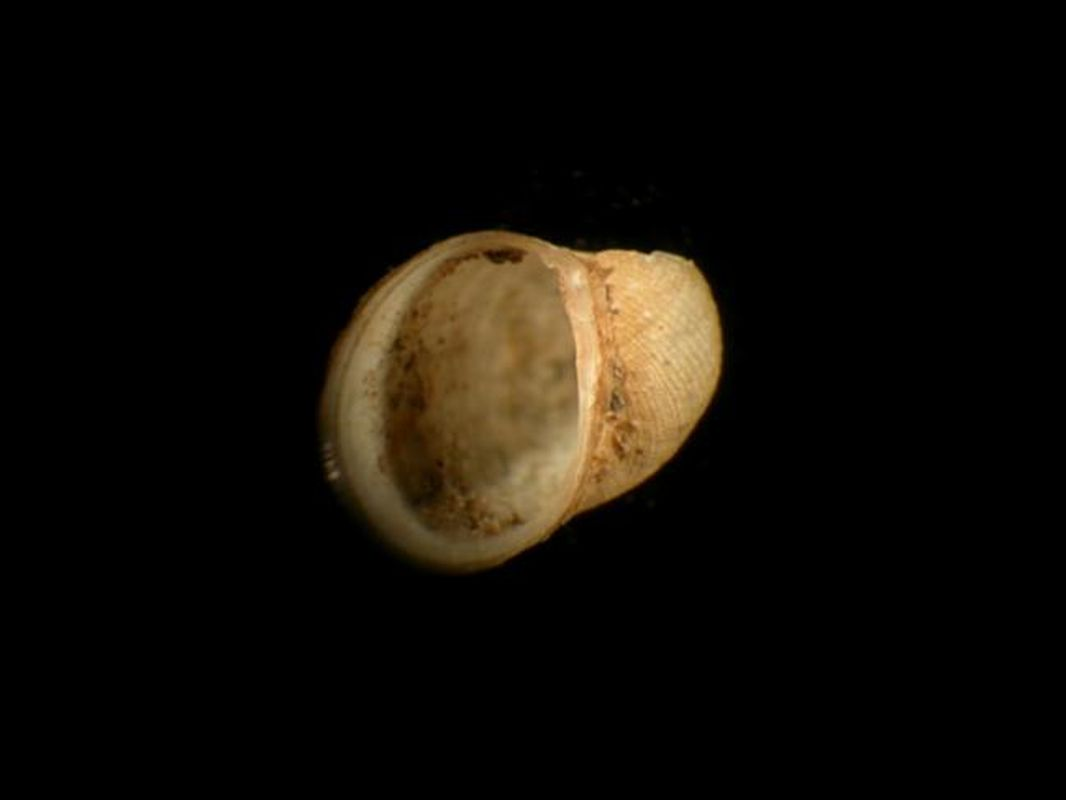

Conservation status
- Least Concern (IUCN 3.1)

Scientific classification
- Kingdom: Animalia
- Phylum: Mollusca
- Class: Gastropoda
- Superorder: Hygrophila
- Family: Planorbidae
- Genus: Bayardella
- Species: B. johni

Binomial name
- Bayardella johni (J. B. Burch, 1977)

Synonyms
- Plesiophysa (Bayardella) johni J. B. Burch, 1977)

= Bayardella johni =

Species of mollusc

Bayardella johni is a small species of freshwater snail in the family Planorbidae. It is endemic to a remote part of Western Australia, but may also be found in the Northern Territory or Queensland. It has a brown shell with a large opening, and has a black mantle. It is likely found underneath stones in fast-moving water.

== Taxonomy ==
Bayardella johni was discovered on August 28, 1943 via the collection of 13 specimens from a remote, unnamed stream in Western Australia. It was not until 1977 that the specimens were first described, a task completed by John B. Burch. He originally placed the species into the genus Plesiophysa for similarities in the radulae, though this new species was dissimilar enough to warrant its own subgenus: Plesiophysa (Bayardella). In 1988, the species was separated from its ties to Plesiophysa and given the name Bayardella johni, as well as named the type species of the new genus Bayardella. The name "johni" is an homage to Burch's son, John Bayard Burch Jr.

The type specimens used in Burch's original description may be found in several museums around the world. Four paratypes (secondary specimens) are located in the Western Australian Museum and the University of Michigan Museum of Zoology, while the holotype (primary specimen) and remaining paratypes are located in the Australian Museum in Sydney.

== Description ==
=== Shell characteristics ===
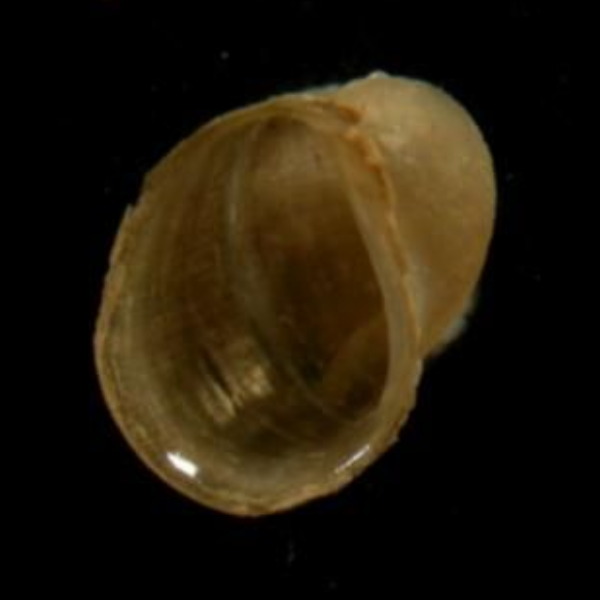
The spire extends slightly over the aperture, and the apertural lip is continuous

Bayardella johni has a small, thin, brown, left-coiling (sinistral) shell. Burch's largest specimen was merely 3.3 by 3.5 mm (0.13 by 0.14 in) in length and width, respectively. The shell makes up to two revolutions (whorls), which expand rapidly so that the final whorl (body whorl) is far larger than the others. Sutures between whorls are set deeply into the shell. The spire, a structure formed by stacks of whorls, is very short, projecting only slightly above the shell opening (aperture), while the umbilicus is narrow and deep. This spire may erode away with age. The aperture itself is nearly as long as the entire shell. The edge (lip) of the aperture is continuous, even on young specimens. The outermost layer of the shell, called the periostracum, extends slightly past the aperture on all sides. The exterior of the shell is additionally decorated with a rectangular pattern formed by two sets of perpendicular raised lines. The interior pillar (columella) of the shell is slightly curved, but not folded.

This species is somewhat similar to Amerianna leopoldi, but may be distinguished by the continuous lip and lack of hair on the shell. The species may be distinguished from Bayardella cosmeta by the shorter spire and larger aperture.

=== Other characteristics ===
The skin (mantle) of this species is black in coloration, except for the ventral (apertural) side, as well as a spot on its right side where it meets the shell. The foot of the animal is relatively large, and is hypothesized to be used to adhere well to substrate. The animal's soft body only occupies the final whorl of the shell.

The radula (a tongue-like organ) has rows of teeth, with a central (rachidian) tooth bordered on each side by 10 lateral teeth, and further by 10 marginal teeth. This can alternatively be represented by 1 rachidian tooth and 20 lateral teeth. The rachidian tooth has been variously described as having either two or three cusps. One interpretation found two large cusps of unequal size, similar to the radula of some B. cosmeta specimens. Another interpretation found three cusps, with the central cusp being the largest, followed by two smaller cusps and two denticles on each side. The lateral teeth have four cusps, two being notably large and sickle-shaped, with the other two being very small. Sometimes, denticles appear between the small and large cusps, which can be as large as the cusps themselves in the case of the second lateral tooth. The lateral teeth gradually transition into the marginal teeth by reducing the length of the four cusps, and the increased length of previously inconspicuous distal cusps. Between tooth 10 and 14, the number of cusps changes erratically, and may number between one to five. By tooth 15, all cusps are of similar size.

== Distribution and habitat ==
Bayardella johni is endemic to the northern part of Western Australia, with its range possibly extending into the Northern Territory, or even western Queensland. It was discovered in an unnamed tributary of the Isdell River, but also includes the Kimberley and Victoria River regions. Though specimens have not been found in the area surrounding the Daly River, the species may additionally be present here. The area it occupies is large and remote, overlapping with national parks and nature reserves, generally with little human activity. For this reason, the IUCN lists this species as Least Concern.

Little is known about the habitat and ecology of this species. It is hypothesized to live in turbulent water, including streams, rivers, and waterfalls. It may live underneath stones. It may share its habitat with other gastropod species, including Amerianna carinata, Amerianna cumingii, Austropeplea vinosa, and species of Gyraulus, Pettancylus, and Notopala.
