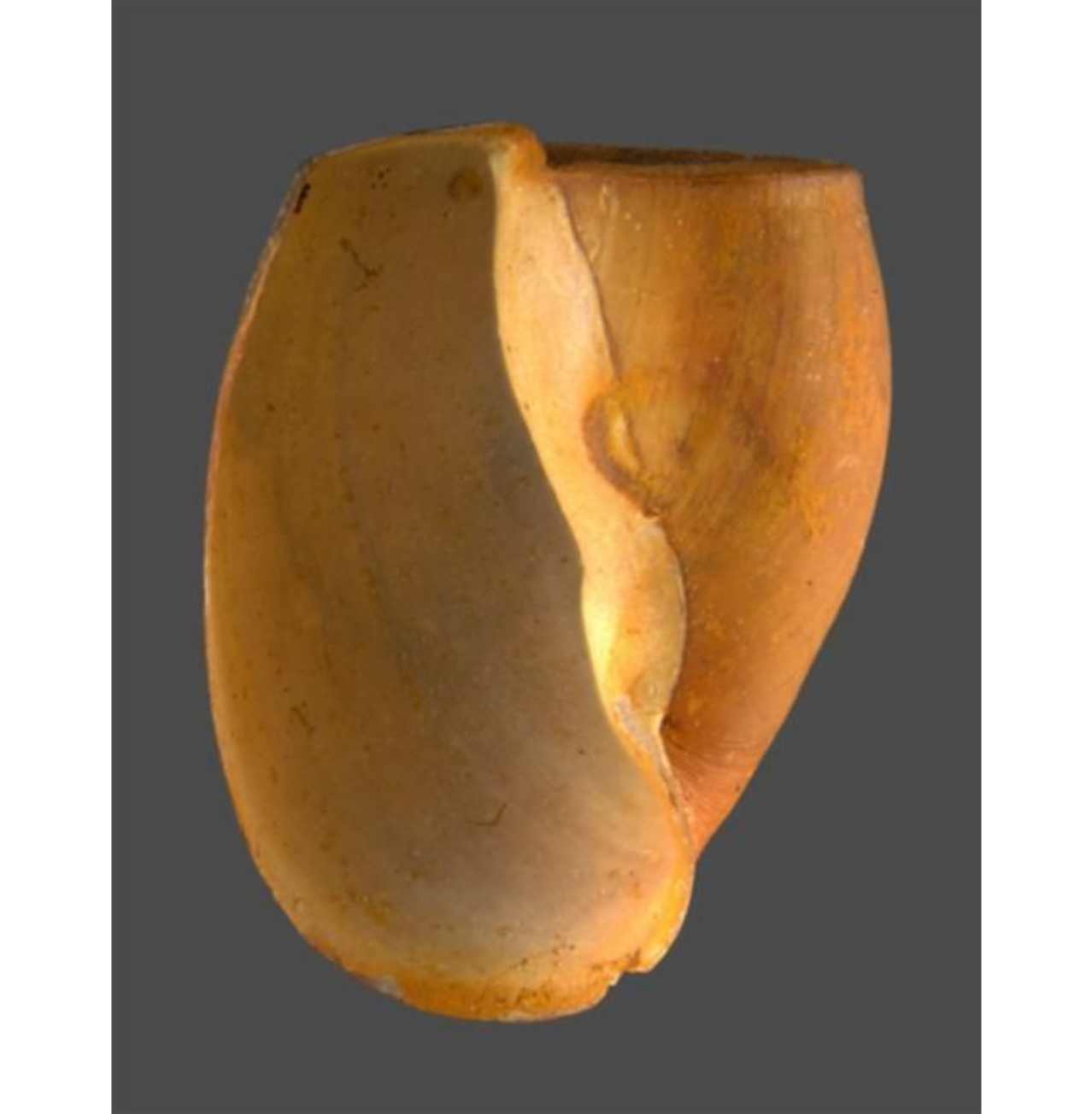

Scientific classification
- Kingdom: Animalia
- Phylum: Mollusca
- Class: Gastropoda
- Superorder: Hygrophila
- Family: Planorbidae
- Genus: Amerianna
- Species: A. reevii

Binomial name
- Amerianna reevii (A. Adams & Angas, 1864)

Synonyms
- Amerianna gabrieli Cotton, 1942; junior synonym; Physa (Ameria) reevii A. Adams & Angas, 1864; original combination; Physa (Ameria) truncata H. Adams, 1861; invalid

= Amerianna reevii =

Species of freshwater snail

Amerianna reevii, or Reeve's pouch snail, is a species of freshwater snail in the family Planorbidae. It was named after Lovell Reeve, who had an interest in shells. The species is found across northern Australia, where it lives in large bodies of water amongst vegetation, mud, and wood.

== Taxonomy ==
Amerianna reevii was first described in 1861 by Henry Adams, and was given the name Physa (Ameria) truncata. However, conflicts with the pre-existing Physa truncata Audouin, 1827 forced the name to be changed. In 1942, the name was changed to Amerianna gabrieli, named after C. J. Gabriel, a conchologist. However, this name did not stay, and was eventually changed again to match the 1864 description of Physa (Ameria) reevii by Arthur Adams and George French Angas. The name "reevii" was given to honor Lovell Reeve, as he was very interested in the shells being described.

Some sources consider A. reevii to be synonymous with Amerianna carinata (i.e., the same species).

The Natural History Museum in London houses two known type specimens (the same individuals used in the original species descriptions). One syntype of Henry Adam's Physa truncata and one syntpe of Physa (Ameria) reevii are known.

== Description ==
The shell coloration of Amerianna reevii has been separately described as light brown, olive, and greenish-brown. Additionally, the shell's interior may be a pale purple or pink. The shape of the shell has variously been described as a truncated oval, as well as a blunt cone. There are 3 or 4 strongly keeled shell revolutions (whorls) which form a truncated spire. This spire may be slightly concave.

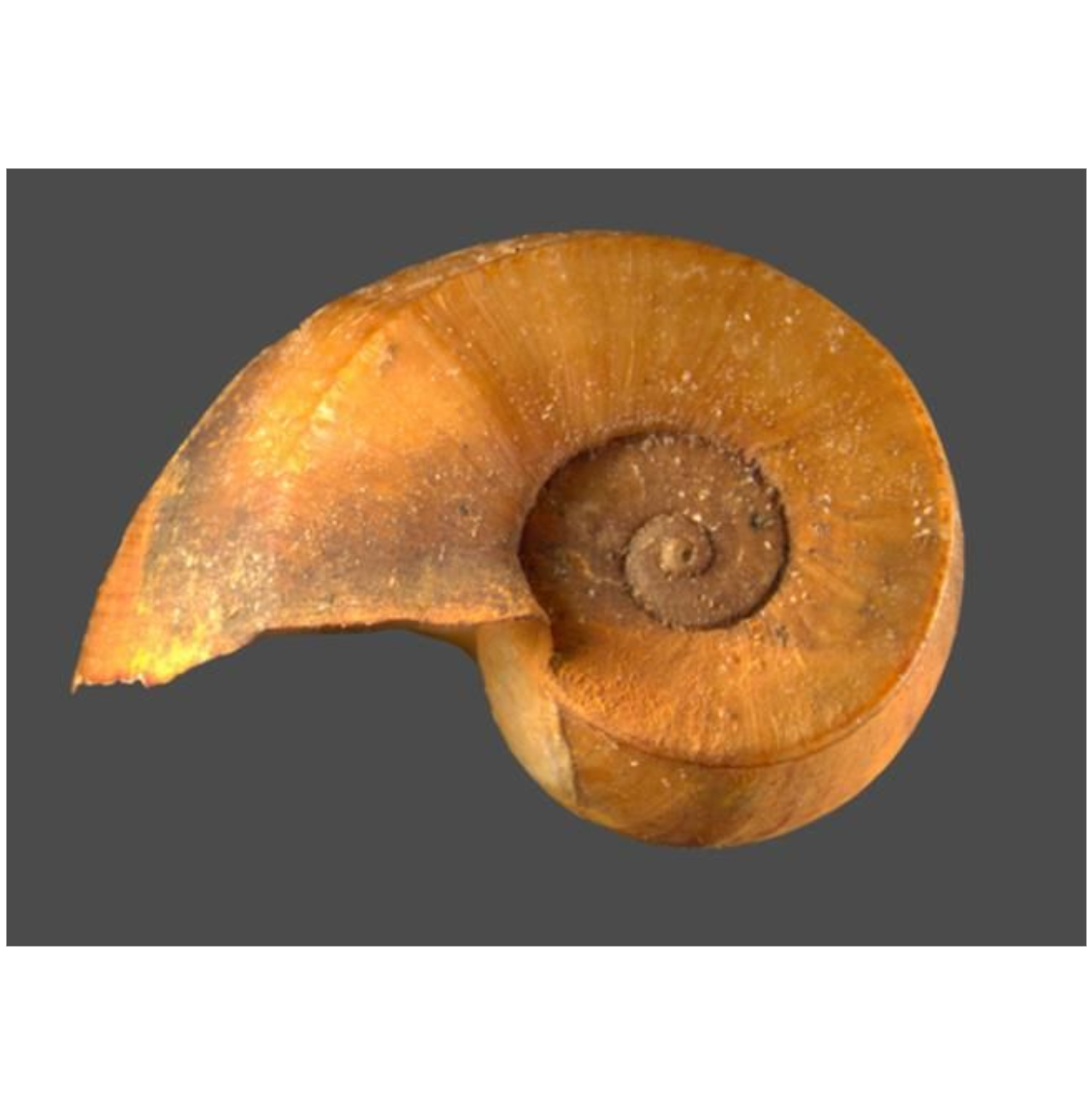
The flattened (truncated) spire

The shell opening (aperture) is somewhat oval-shaped, with the back edge (lip) being angular, and the front edge being curved. The central pillar (columella) may possess a twisting structure called a plait, though it has been described inconsistently, with some sources claiming it is hardly noticeable, and others claiming it is moderate or even very strong. It is of intermediate size relative to other Amerianna species.

== Distribution and habitat ==
Amerianna reevii is a somewhat common native species in Australia, and may be found in Queensland, the Northern Territory, and parts of Western Australia. In Queensland, the species has been recorded from the Calliope River, Burdekin River, and around Rockhampton. In the Northern Territory, it has been found to inhabit Arnhem land, as well as wetlands along the Howard, Adelaide, and Mary Rivers. In Western Australia, the species is restricted to the eastern part of Kimberley. One additional record of the species states that they may be found in the Kei Islands in Indonesia.

Unlike other Amerianna species, this species seems to prefer larger habitats, including billabongs. It lives on a variety of different substrates, including mud, wood, leaves, and aquatic vegetation.

== Human impacts ==
The wetlands that this species may inhabit in the Northern Territory are at risk of flooding due to rising sea levels. The resulting increase in salt concentration (salinity) from seawater intrusion has been shown to negatively impact this species, none of which were able to survive salinities of 15 ppt. Even in low salinities of 2.5 ppt, significant changes in essential fatty acid production was observed.

The species has been observed to feed on agricultural rice plants in the Northern Territory, which is rare amongst native species.
