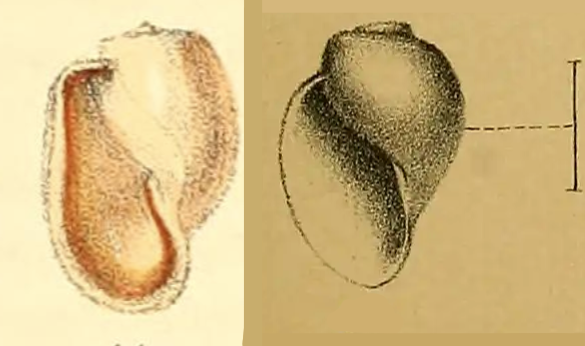
- As Physa cumingii (left) and Physa bonushenricus (right)

Scientific classification
- Kingdom: Animalia
- Phylum: Mollusca
- Class: Gastropoda
- Superorder: Hygrophila
- Family: Planorbidae
- Genus: Amerianna
- Species: A. cumingii

Binomial name
- Amerianna cumingii (H. Adams, 1861)

Synonyms
- Amerianna bonushenricus (A. Adams & Angas, 1864); junior subjective synonym; Physa (Ameria) bonushenricus A. Adams & Angas, 1864; junior subjective synonym; Physa (Ameria) cumingii H. Adams, 1861; superseded combination; Physa cumingi H. Adams, 1861; superseded combination

= Amerianna cumingii =

Species of gastropod

Amerianna cumingii is a small species of freshwater snail in the family Planorbidae. It is found in the Northern Territory of Australia, and is sometimes used as a test species for uranium pollution in mining operations.

== Taxonomy ==
Amerianna cumingii was first described as Physa (Ameria) cumingii in 1861 by Henry Adams. Specimens were first discovered by collector Hugh Cuming from Port Essington in the Northern Territory of Australia. A later Amerianna species, A. bonushenricus, is now considered to be the same as A. cumingii. The name bonushenricus (bonus-Henricus, good-Henry) was given to honor the person who designated the now defunct subgenus Physa (Ameria).

Some sources consider A. cumingii to be the same species as Amerianna carinata, though others consider them to be separate.

4 specimens used in the original descriptions (syntypes) are known, and all are held at the collections of the Natural History Museum of London. 3 of these specimens are from Adams's 1861 description, while the remaining specimen is from the 1854 description of Physa bonushenricus.

== Description ==
The oval-shaped, brown shell of Amerianna cumingii measures about 12 mm (0.47 in) long and 8 mm (0.31 in) in diameter, though some may grow to be as long as 15 mm (0.59 in). It has 4 shell revolutions (whorls), which form a short, flat, rounded spire. This spire forms a rounded obtuse angle with the final (body) whorl. The whorls are small, though the last whorl is large and is set at an oblique angle relative to the others. The shell opening (aperture) is somewhat oval-shaped, and displays a twisting structure called a plait. The outer edge (lip) of the aperture is relatively straight. Its shell is sinistral, meaning it curls to the left.

The shell is slightly thicker than that of Amerianna carinata. The spire is somewhat taller in this species relative to other Amerianna species.

== Distribution ==
Amerianna cumingii is known to inhabit the Northern Territory of Australia. It has been found in Port Essington, Arnhem Land, and the Alligator Rivers. Additional records of the species in Queensland and New Zealand exist as well.

== Reproduction ==
Individuals of this species are simultaneous hermaphrodites, meaning they possess both male and female sex organs at the same time. In laboratory conditions, a pair of snails may consistently lay about 3 egg capsules per day, each capsule containing about 30 eggs each.

== Human uses and impacts ==
For over 10 years, this species has been used in bioassays to determine uranium mining pollution, giving workers early notice of unsafe levels. The test involves at least one tank upstream from the mining, and one tank downstream. 2 snails are placed in each tank, and are subjected to the water pumped in from the river. After 4 days, the number of eggs laid is compared between upstream and downstream snails, with fewer eggs corresponding to higher pollution levels. Additional tests include the survival of hatched snail larvae.

In laboratory conditions, Amerianna cumingii has been described as relatively consistent, easily handleable, and able to maintain stable populations. The effects of uranium on the animals includes its presence in the ovotestis, which is hypothesized to be the cause of lowered egg-laying capability.
