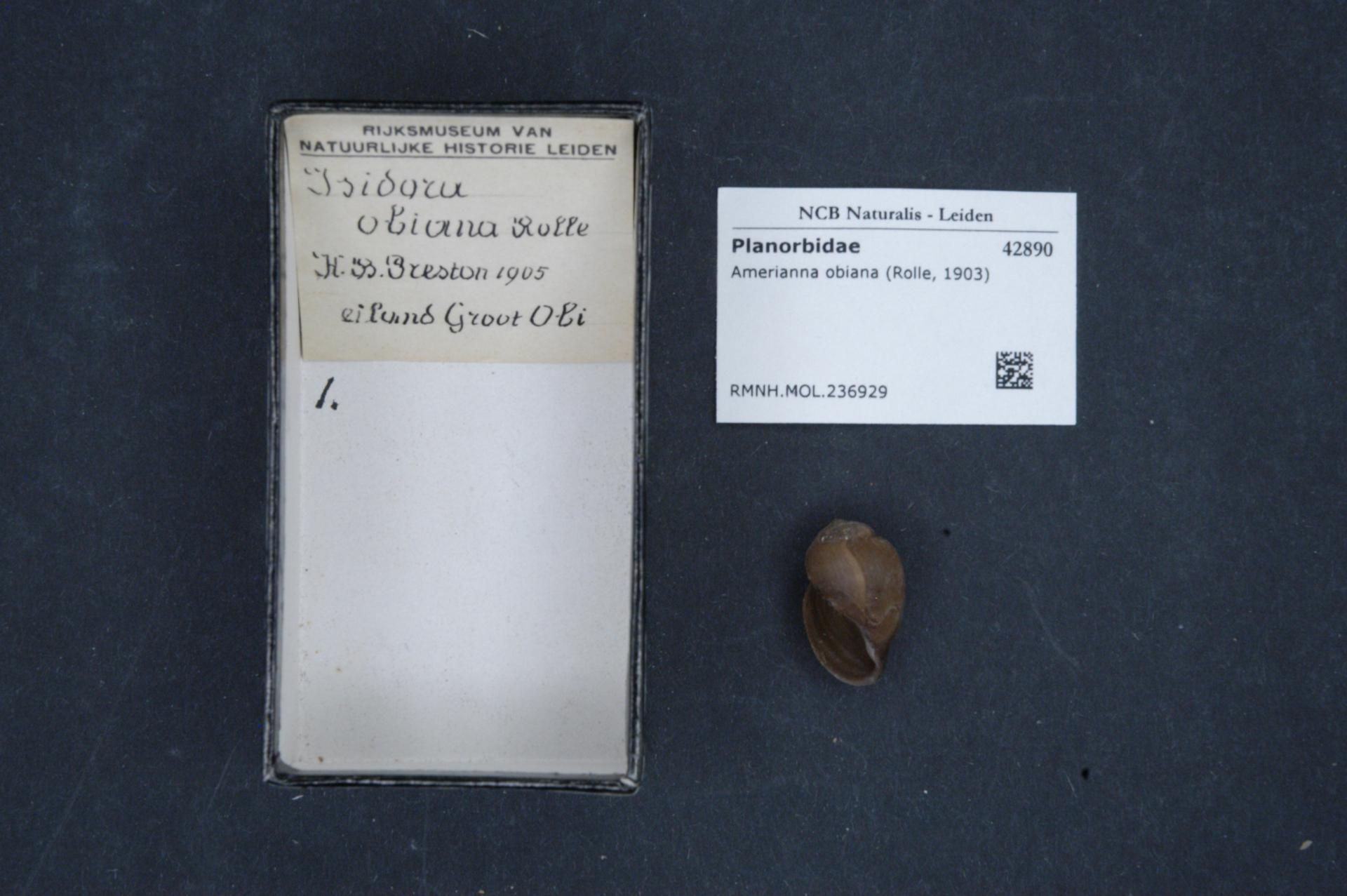
- Preserved specimen from 1905

Conservation status
- Endangered (IUCN 3.1)

Scientific classification
- Kingdom: Animalia
- Phylum: Mollusca
- Class: Gastropoda
- Superorder: Hygrophila
- Family: Planorbidae
- Genus: Amerianna
- Species: A. obiana

Binomial name
- Amerianna obiana (Rolle, 1903)

Synonyms
- Ameria obiana Rolle, 1903; original combination

= Amerianna obiana =

Species of gastropod

Amerianna obiana is a species of freshwater snail in the family Planorbidae. It is found exclusively on the island of Obi in Indonesia. Due to its limited distribution and threats from nearby mining operations, this species is considered to be endangered.

== Taxonomy ==
Amerianna obiana was first described by Hermann Rolle in 1903 as Ameria obiana.

Two syntypes are known, with one being located at the Museum für Naturkunde in Berlin, and the other at the Zoological Museum in Amsterdam.

== Description ==
Amerianna obiana has an oval-shaped shell that measures 18.8 mm (0.74 in) in height by 11.5 mm (0.45 in) in diameter. The shell is left-curling (sinistral). There are 4.5 convex whorls, or shell revolutions, which form a structure called a spire that sticks up slightly. The aperture (shell opening) is oblong, and measures 13.5 by 6.5 mm (0.53 by 0.26 in).

== Distribution and habitat ==
Amerianna obiana is only known to inhabit the island of Obi in Indonesia. Though its exact distribution on the island is unknown, as of 2026, there are only five locations suitable for the species. Water usage from nickel mining operations are likely to reduce the available habitat further, which is why in 2026, the species was listed as endangered by the IUCN.

The habitat and ecology of A. obiana is not known. Like other Amerianna species, however, it is suspected to live in slow-moving and still waters attached to aquatic vegetation.
