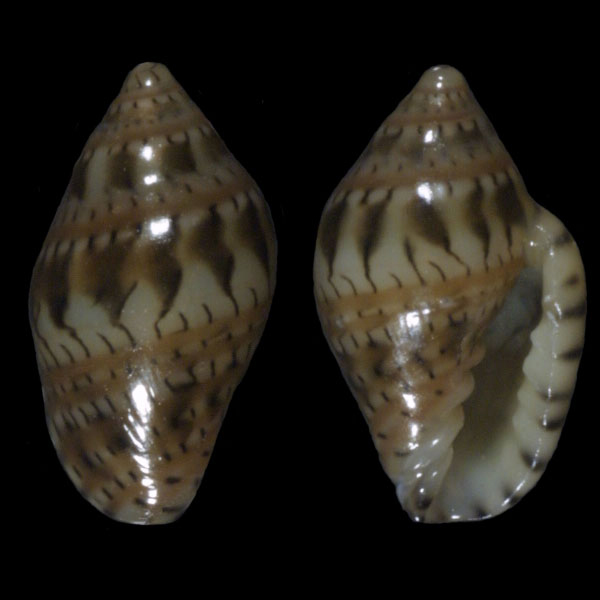
- Apertural (right) and abapertural (left) views of a shell of M. gemmula

Scientific classification
- Kingdom: Animalia
- Phylum: Mollusca
- Class: Gastropoda
- Subclass: Caenogastropoda
- Order: Neogastropoda
- Family: Marginellidae
- Subfamily: Marginellinae
- Genus: Marginella
- Species: M. gemmula

Binomial name
- Marginella gemmula Bavay in Dautzenberg, 1913

Synonyms
- Marginella (Kaokomarginella) gemmula Bavay, 1912· accepted, alternate representation

= Marginella gemmula =

Species of gastropod

Marginella gemmula is a species of very small sea snail, a marine gastropod mollusk in the family Marginellidae, the margin snails.

== Description ==
=== Shell ===
The shell of Marginella gemmula, while glossy and smooth to the touch, has spires that can be anywhere from flat to moderately elevated. Most shells have various colors, but a small number can be colorless. On the outside of the shell, the columella has four plaits. The outside lip is thicker than other such creatures, and the inside of the shell sports a denticulate set of teeth and/or folds. Unlike other gastropods, Marginella gemmula's siphonal canal is not very deep, but is still present. There is no operculum present with Marginella gemmula.

=== Flesh ===
The head of Marginella gemmula is bifurcated, with the siphon extending behind it. When moving, the foot of the animal extends past the shell.

== Distribution ==
This species occurs in Angola at depths between 15 m and 35 m.
