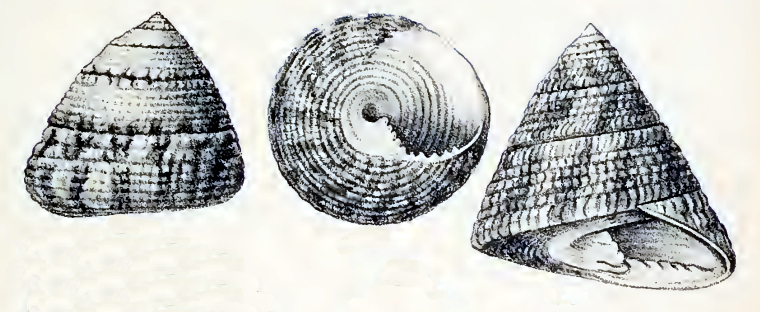
- Drawing showing three views of a shell of Trochus stellatus

Scientific classification
- Kingdom: Animalia
- Phylum: Mollusca
- Class: Gastropoda
- Subclass: Vetigastropoda
- Order: Trochida
- Superfamily: Trochoidea
- Family: Trochidae
- Genus: Trochus
- Species: T. stellatus

Binomial name
- Trochus stellatus Gmelin, 1791

Synonyms
- Polydonta stellata Chemnitz; Pyramidea tubiferus Chenu, 1859; Trochus incrassatus Lamarck, 1822; Trochus stellaris Röding, 1798

= Trochus stellatus =

Species of gastropod

Trochus stellatus, common name the stellate trochus, is a species of sea snail, a marine gastropod mollusk in the family Trochidae, the top snails. The species is now extinct.

Trochus incrassatus Lamarck, 1822 is considered a synonym of this species by the Australian Faunal Directory.

== Description ==
The size of this large, heavy, top-shaped shell varies between 18 mm and 40 mm. The shell has wrinkled plaits and concatenated dots. The sutures of the upper whorls are spinous and radiated. The shell has a yellow tint to it and has brown stripes. The inside of the shell is a glossy white.

(Description as Trochus incrassatus) The height of the shell attains 30 mm, its diameter also 30 mm. The, thick, heavy, solid shell has a conical shape. It is, whitish, radiately striped above and below with purplish red. The outlines of the spire are convex. The 7 to 8 whorls are coarsely granulose in about 5 or 6 spiral series, of which the upper series is most prominent. The periphery is rounded. The base of the shell is a little concave, with about 7 concentric granulose or subgranulose lirae. The aperture is strongly lirate within upon the parietal and outer wall. The basal margin contains four or five teeth. The columella is dentate. The umbilical tract is nearly smooth or obsoletely spirally plicate.

== Distribution ==
This marine species occurs off India, Sri Lanka, the Philippines, Japan, Oceania, New Caledonia, and Australia (the Northern Territory, Queensland and Western Australia); also in the Indian Ocean off Madagascar.
