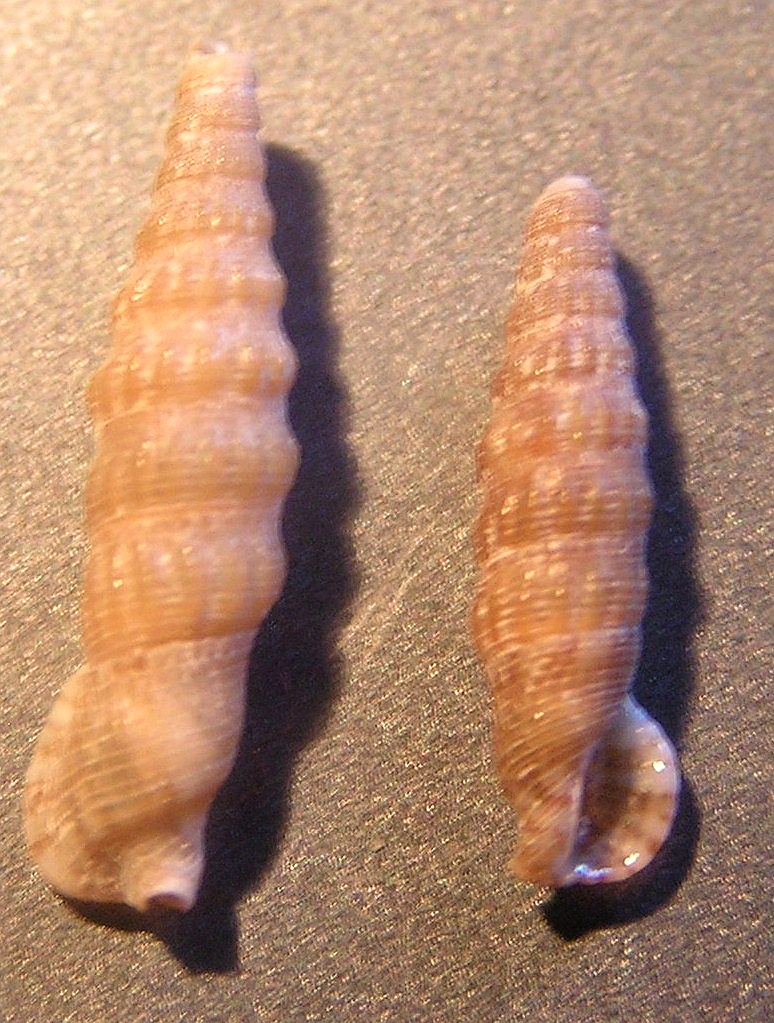
- Colina macrostoma shells

Scientific classification
- Kingdom: Animalia
- Phylum: Mollusca
- Class: Gastropoda
- Subclass: Caenogastropoda
- Order: incertae sedis
- Family: Cerithiidae
- Genus: Colina; H. Adams & A. Adams, 1854

Type species
- Cerithium macrostoma Hinds, 1844

Synonyms
- Cerithium (Colina) H. Adams & A. Adams, 1854

= Colina (gastropod) =

Genus of gastropods

Colina is a genus of sea snails, marine gastropod mollusks in the family Cerithiidae.

== Species ==
Species within the genus Colina include:

- Colina arifi Bozzetti, 2011
- Colina ciclostoma Bozzetti, 2008
- Colina lorenzi Bozzetti, 2018
- Colina macrostoma (Hinds, 1844)
- Colina madagascariensis Bozzetti, 2008
- Colina pinguis (A. Adams, 1855)
- Colina selecta Melvill & Standen, 1898

Synonyms

- Subgenus Colina (Ischnocerithium) Thiele, 1929: synonym of Cerithium Bruguière, 1789
- Colina (Ischnocerithium) rostrata (A. Adams in G.B. Sowerby II, 1855) : synonym of Cerithium rostratum A. Adams in G.B. Sowerby II, 1855
- Colina perimensis Jousseaume, 1931: synonym of Colina pinguis (A. Adams, 1855)
- Colina pupiformis A. Adams, 1854 : synonym of Colina macrostoma (Hinds, 1844)
- Colina pygmaea H. Adams, 1867 : synonym of Colina macrostoma (Hinds, 1844)

Nomen dubium

- Colina gracilis H. Adams, 1866 (nomen dubium)
