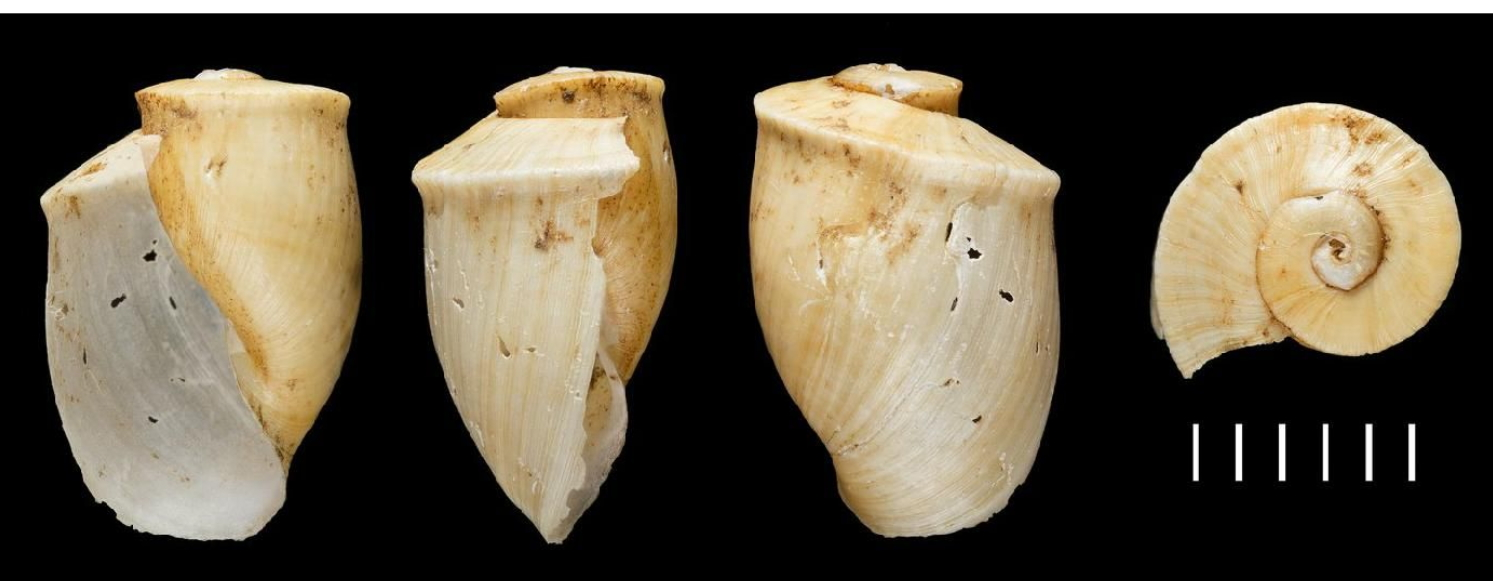
- Amerianna carinata shell (syntype at the Natural History Museum, London)

Scientific classification
- Kingdom: Animalia
- Phylum: Mollusca
- Class: Gastropoda
- Superorder: Hygrophila
- Family: Planorbidae
- Genus: Amerianna
- Species: A. carinata

Binomial name
- Amerianna carinata (H. Adams, 1861)

Synonyms
- Physa (Ameria) carinata H. Adams, 1861; basionym

= Amerianna carinata =

Species of gastropod

Amerianna carinata, or the Carinated planorbid, is a species of freshwater air-breathing snails, aquatic pulmonate gastropod molluscs in the family Planorbidae, the ram's horn snails. It is native to Australia, but has been introduced elsewhere.

== Taxonomy ==
Amerianna carinata was originally described under the genus Physa, as Physa (Ameria) carinata, in 1861 by Henry Adams. It was first discovered in the Boyne River in Queensland, Australia.

Some sources speculate that numerous other Amerianna species may actually be synonymous with A. carinata.

== Description ==
=== Shell ===
The shell is somewhat oval-shaped, thin, and pale yellowish-brown in color. The diameter of the shell is about 1.7 times larger than its length. Exact dimensions range from 10.5 to 11.8 mm (0.41 to 0.46 in) in height for the type specimens, to 8.3 to 9.4 mm (0.33 to 0.37 in) for introduced specimens. There are 3 whorls, or revolutions of the shell, which curl to the left (sinistral). The whorls very shallowly protrude from the base to form a short spire. This short spire may distinguish the species from the slightly longer spire of Amerianna obesula. The final whorl, called the apex, is flat. Each whorl is strongly keeled (carinated), but not raised, with the shoulder instead being rectangular. The aperture (shell opening) is slightly oval-shaped, though other sources point towards a rectangular shape. The aperture measures 8 to 9 mm (0.31 to 0.35 in) in height. The inside of the lip of the aperture may possess a red or purple stripe. The center of the shell (the columella) is slightly folded, producing a 3-dimensional structure called a columellar plait. Small and medium sized individuals possess faint spiral ridges on the shell's surface.

=== Reproductive system ===
The ovotestis has between 90–110 diverticula (outpocketing structures), which are round and mostly unbranched. Connecting to the ovotestis, the collecting canal is longer and wider than the ends of the ovisperm duct. The oviduct is quite large and approximately quadrate in shape, possessing some cord-shaped projections at its end. The vagina is quite short and no bursa copulatrix is observed (sperm-storing pouch).The albumen gland is large and bean-shaped. The prostate gland is smaller than the spermatheca, and possesses between 20–30 diverticula with 2 or 3 branches each. No flagella or accessory organs are observed on the penis complex. The penis itself is cylindrical, ending in a triangular point with no stylet. This shape is similar to that of Amerianna obesula, though may distinguish it from other Amerianna species, namely A. buruana and A. leopoldi.

=== Other ===
The mantle (skin) of the animal is colored with sparse patches of dark pigment, with the highest density near the snail's collar, where the skin meets the shell. The gill (pseudobranch) is deeply folded and pokes out of the collar. The salivary glands are very large with diverticula ranging from knob-shaped to finger-shaped. The gastrointestinal tract is similar to that of other pulmonate mollusks.

The ureter of this species is on the opposite side relative to Amerianna buruana and Amerianna pesigani. Additionally, renal ridge is observed in this species, unlike in A. buruanus.

The radula (toothy tongue) of this species has more than 29 teeth per row. The central (rachidian) tooth has two cusps, while the outer (marginal) teeth have 3 cusps. The middle (lateral) teeth 7, 8, and 9 alternate between 2 and 3 cusps. Beyond the 13th tooth, all remaining teeth are serrated.

== Distribution ==
Amerianna carinata is native to Australia. The type locality, where the species was originally discovered, is Boyne River in Queensland, Australia. It is also known from New South Wales, as well as the Kai Islands in Indonesia.

=== Non-native distribution ===
This species was introduced to island of Java, Indonesia, with its first discovery in 1951. It was found in aquariums at the Bogor Botanical Gardens, leading to the conclusion that the species may have been introduced via the aquarium trade.

A. carinata was also introduced to the French Caribbean island territory of Martinique in the 1980's, first discovered in April of 1987 from the Galion River. Though it has now spread across the entirety of the island, its habitat is limited only to sections of riverbanks which do not flood. Its limited population on the island may, in part, be due to the presence of other snails in the family Thiaridae. It is hypothesized that the species was introduced from ornamental aquatic plants.

== Human use ==
Amerianna carinata has been sold as food for ornamental fish in the pet trade. It may also appear as a hitchhiker on ornamental aquatic plants.
