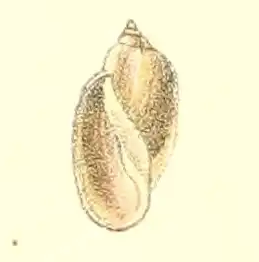
- From its original 1874 description

Conservation status
- Least Concern (IUCN 3.1)

Scientific classification
- Kingdom: Animalia
- Phylum: Mollusca
- Class: Gastropoda
- Superorder: Hygrophila
- Family: Planorbidae
- Genus: Amerianna
- Species: A. papyracea

Binomial name
- Amerianna papyracea (G. B. Sowerby II, 1874)

Synonyms
- Physa papyracea G. B. Sowerby II, 1874; original combination

= Amerianna papyracea =

Species of gastropod

Amerianna papyracea, or the paper physa, is a species of freshwater snail in the family Planorbidae. It is found on two islands in Papua New Guinea, though it may be found across the larger New Guinea island. It is apparently common, and its conservation is considered to be of least concern.

== Taxonomy ==
Amerianna papyracea was first described by George Brettingham Sowerby II in 1874, though it was originally given the name Physa papyracea. It was not given a type locality, meaning the location of its discovery is unknown.

== Description ==
Amerianna papyracea has a nearly cylindrical shell with a short spire. The columella (central axis of the shell) possesses a twisting structure called a plait, though it is barely noticeable. Very small lines called striae may be present. The shell is notably very thin.

== Distribution and habitat ==
This species may be found in Papua New Guinea with two localities known; Lake Wisdom on Long Island, and Manne Island. However, the species could potentially occur across the entire island of New Guinea, including both the Indonesian and Papuan sides. It occurs in very clean environments free from human activity, which is why in 2026, the species was assessed as least concern by the IUCN. Within Lake Wisdom, individuals were found on algae-covered rocks, usually at depths of 0 to 6 m (0 to 20 ft).
