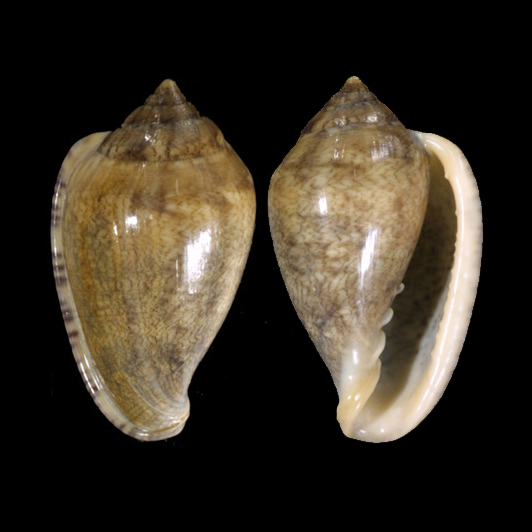

Scientific classification
- Kingdom: Animalia
- Phylum: Mollusca
- Class: Gastropoda
- Subclass: Caenogastropoda
- Order: Neogastropoda
- Family: Marginellidae
- Genus: Marginella
- Species: M. orstomi

Binomial name
- Marginella orstomi Coomans, 1975

= Marginella orstomi =

Species of gastropod

Marginella orstomi is a species of colorful small sea snail, a marine gastropod mollusk in the family Marginellidae.

The marine malacofauna of West Africa is rich in Marginellidae. The holotype of Marginella orstomi was collected at a depth of between 200 and 250 m, off Pointe Noire, Republic of Congo. (A related species was dredged from a more northern locality off the coast of Congo.) The species is also related to Marginella huberti Clover, 1972, from Lobito, Angola.

== Description ==
The shell is of medium size, elongate pear-shaped, with 4½ whorls. The shell has a ground coloration of dirty yellow with dark areas, and a pattern consisting of many dark grey transverse irregular zigzag lines sometimes crossed by spiral rows of small dots.

The apex of the shell is sharp, the angle of the spire is about 70°. The aperture is straight and rather narrow, about ¾ of the length of the shell. The color pattern on the outside of the body whorl is visible on the inside of the aperture, and the outer lip is thickened and deflected outward. On the outside about 30 to 35 grey transverse stripes are present. The inner surface of the lip is almost smooth, with one tooth near the posterior end. There are four white oblique plaits on the anterior half of the columella.

== Type material ==
- Holotype (adult) 28.0 x 15.1 mm Zoölogisch Museum, University of Amsterdam
- Paratype (adult) 23.4 x 12.5 mm Zoölogisch Museum, University of Amsterdam
- Paratype (juvenile) 25.4 x 12.3 mm Zoölogisch Museum, University of Amsterdam

== Remarks ==
Marginella orstomi is closely related to Marginella huberti Clover, 1972, which was collected further south, on the Angolan coast. Both species are characterized by the presence of a white tooth on the inside of the outer lip near the posterior end. Some differences in the shell of both species are mentioned here:

	M. huberti	M. orstomi
Length	17 – 19 mm	23 – 28 mm
Apical angle	80° - 87°	66° - 72°
Outer lip	dentate	smooth
Stripes on outer lip	about 20	about 30

== Comparative M. orstomi vs M. huberti ==
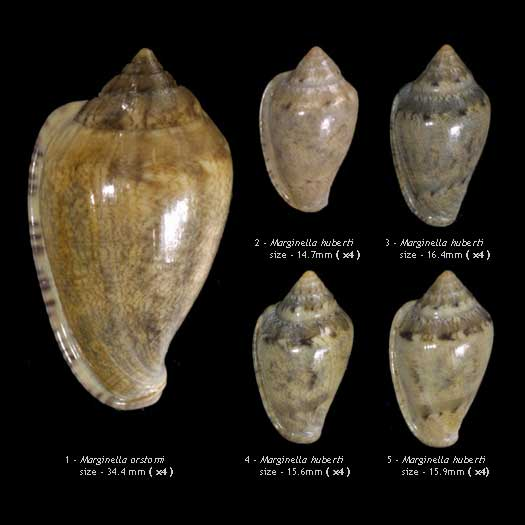
dorsal views

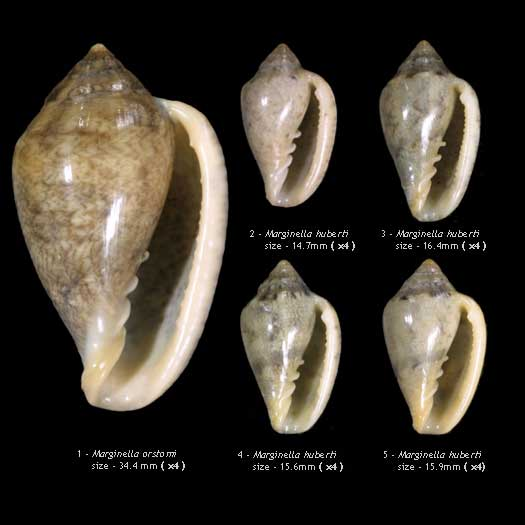
ventral views

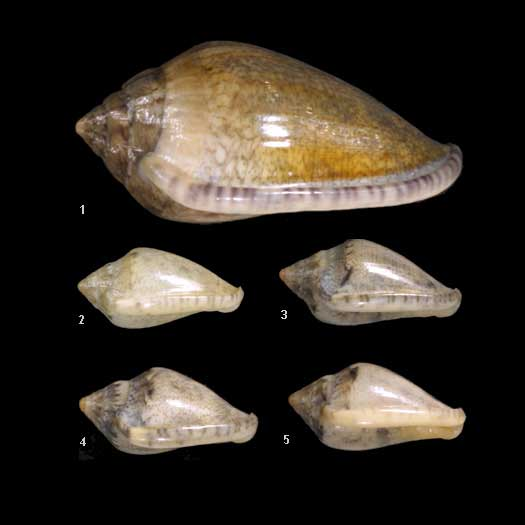
side lip views

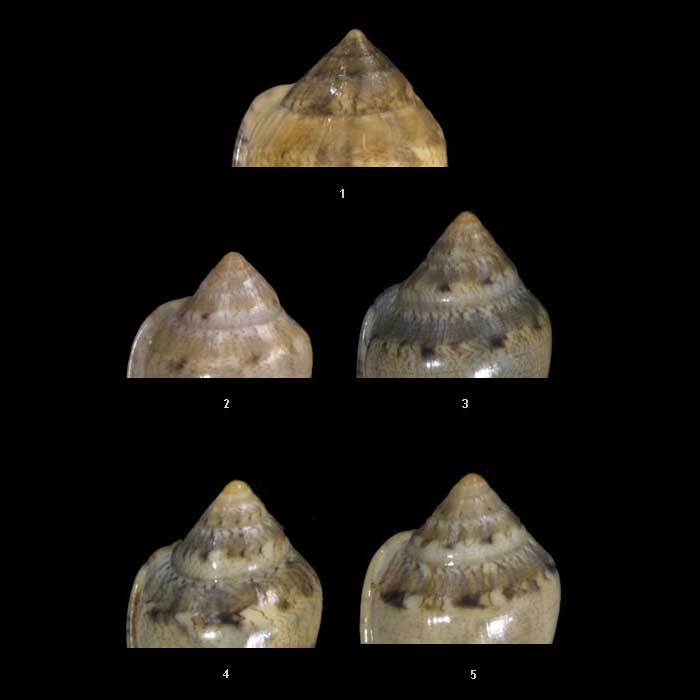
protoconch views

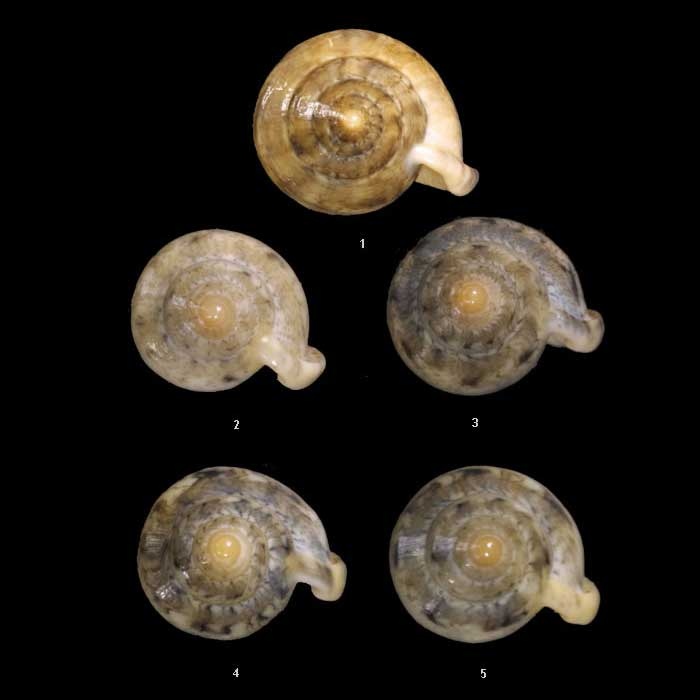
teleconch views
