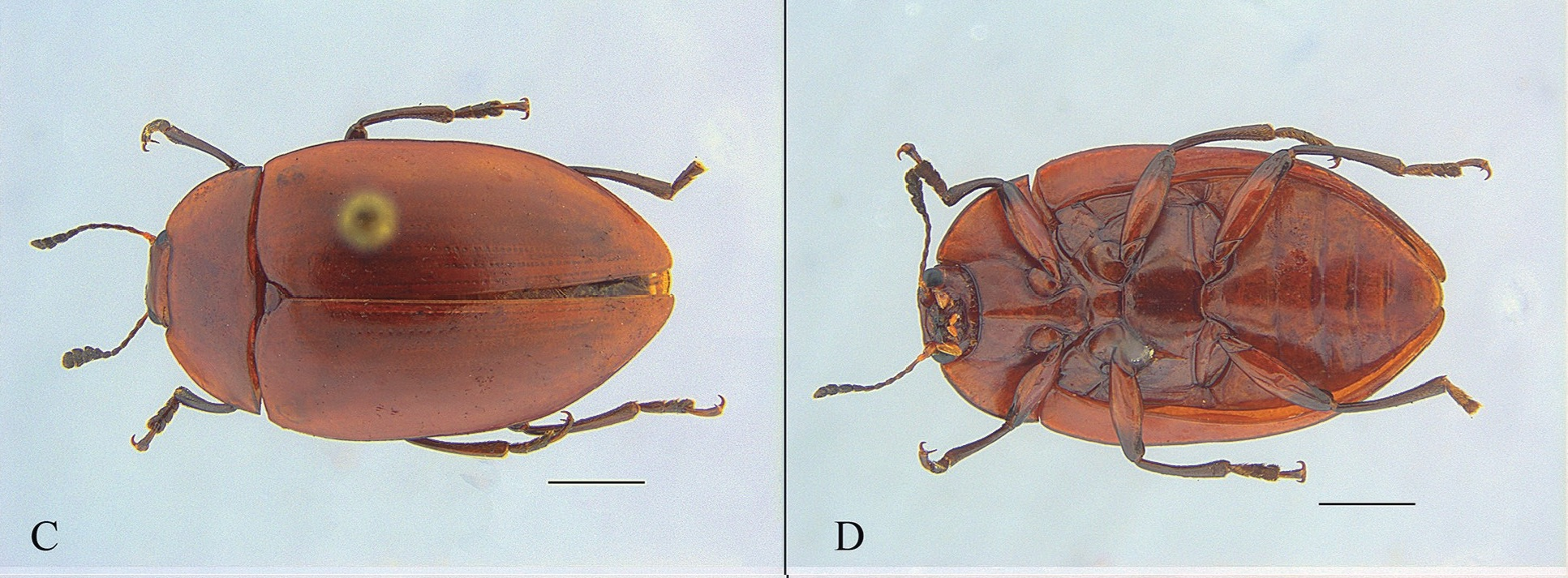

Scientific classification
- Kingdom: Animalia
- Phylum: Arthropoda
- Clade: Pancrustacea
- Class: Insecta
- Order: Coleoptera
- Suborder: Polyphaga
- Infraorder: Cucujiformia
- Family: Erotylidae
- Genus: Iphiclus
- Species: I. simplex

Binomial name
- Iphiclus simplex (Lacordaire, 1842)

Synonyms
- See text

= Iphiclus simplex =

Species of beetle

Iphiclus simplex is a Neotropical species of pleasing fungus beetle (family Erotylidae. Within its family, it belongs to subfamily Erotylinae.

== Description ==
This beetle is 8.5-12.5 mm long and 5-7 mm wide as adults. It is overall brick red, but the tips of the femora, and all of the tibiae and tarsi are black. The similar (and presumably closely related) I.costaricensis and I.melanopus from Central America have dimples next to the central lobe of the pronotum, and the former also has a black scutellum. I.nigritarsis, probably also a very close relative and sympatric with I.simplex in Peru, is overall lighter, almost yellow. I.nigropectus and I.tibialis from Brazil differ from I.simplex in having a black scutellum; the former also has a dark meso- and metathorax. The extent of black coloration on the legs and antennae varies somewhat among this group of presumably closely related beetles, but is not generally sufficient to distinguish the species.

== Systematics ==
In the huge and probably polyphyletic genus Iphiclus, this species is placed in subgenus Brachymerus. For some time, this subgenus was erroneously known as Neomorphoides, with I.simplex as the type species, because I.nitidulus – not considered particularly close to I.simplex and now in subgenus Neobarytopus – was believed to be the type species of Brachymerus. But the type of this subgenus is the originally-designated I.tibialis, which is assumed to be a close relative of I.simplex. As for all Iphiclus and allies, however, this placement is provisional, pending a thorough review.

Invalid junior synonyms of this beetle are:

- Brachysphaenus simplex (Lacordaire, 1842)
- Brachysphoenus simplex Lacordaire, 1842
- Morphoides simplex (Lacordaire, 1842)

== Distribution and ecology ==
I.simplex is found in Peru, Bolivia, and southern to southeastern Brazil, with modern records from Mato Grosso, Mato Grosso do Sul and Goiás. While most of the Naturalis specimens of I.simplex have only "Brazil" as their origin, one (procured by Hermann Rolle and formerly in the Veth collection) is from Santa Catarina, while another (formerly in the de Vos tot Nederveen Cappel collection) came from São Paulo city or state. There is also a specimen in the Naturalis collection which was procured by Benoît-Philibert Perroud and is labeled "Mexico" – this is almost certainly an error, because no other records of I.simplex from the Northern Hemisphere are known. A specimen owned by Leopold Mader was from Marcapata District (or its capital city in the Araza-Palquilla valley) in the Andes of Peru. Thus, it occurs across at least about 3,000 km and 3,000 m of altitude, from the Madre de Dios River to the Atlantic Ocean; however, the extent to which it ranges north along the Madeira River into the less-deforested Brazilian states of Amazonas and Pará is not at all well-known. Similarly, while it might occur in Alto Paraguay between Bolivia and Brazil, there do not seem to be any specimen records from Paraguay so far.

Less conspicuous than many of its more colorful relatives, it might not be easy to find, but does not seem to be particularly rare: In the 1941-42 review of the Naturalis collection, with 10 specimens it was the most abundant member of subgenus Brachymerus, with only 5 of the roughly 60 Iphiclus species in this collection having more specimens – I.annularis (subgenus Neacronotus, 12 specimens), I.ruficeps (subgenus Saccomorphus, 13 specimens), I.trifasciatus (subgenus Neobarytopus, 14 specimens), I.abdominalis (subgenus Iphiclus, 17 specimens) and I.bimaculatus (subgenus Saccomorphus, 22 specimens). Similarly, in the famous George Crotch collection at the UMZC, I.simplex is moderately common – both among all the roughly 130 Iphiclus species, as well as among the Iphiclus (Brachymerus) – with 5 individuals.
