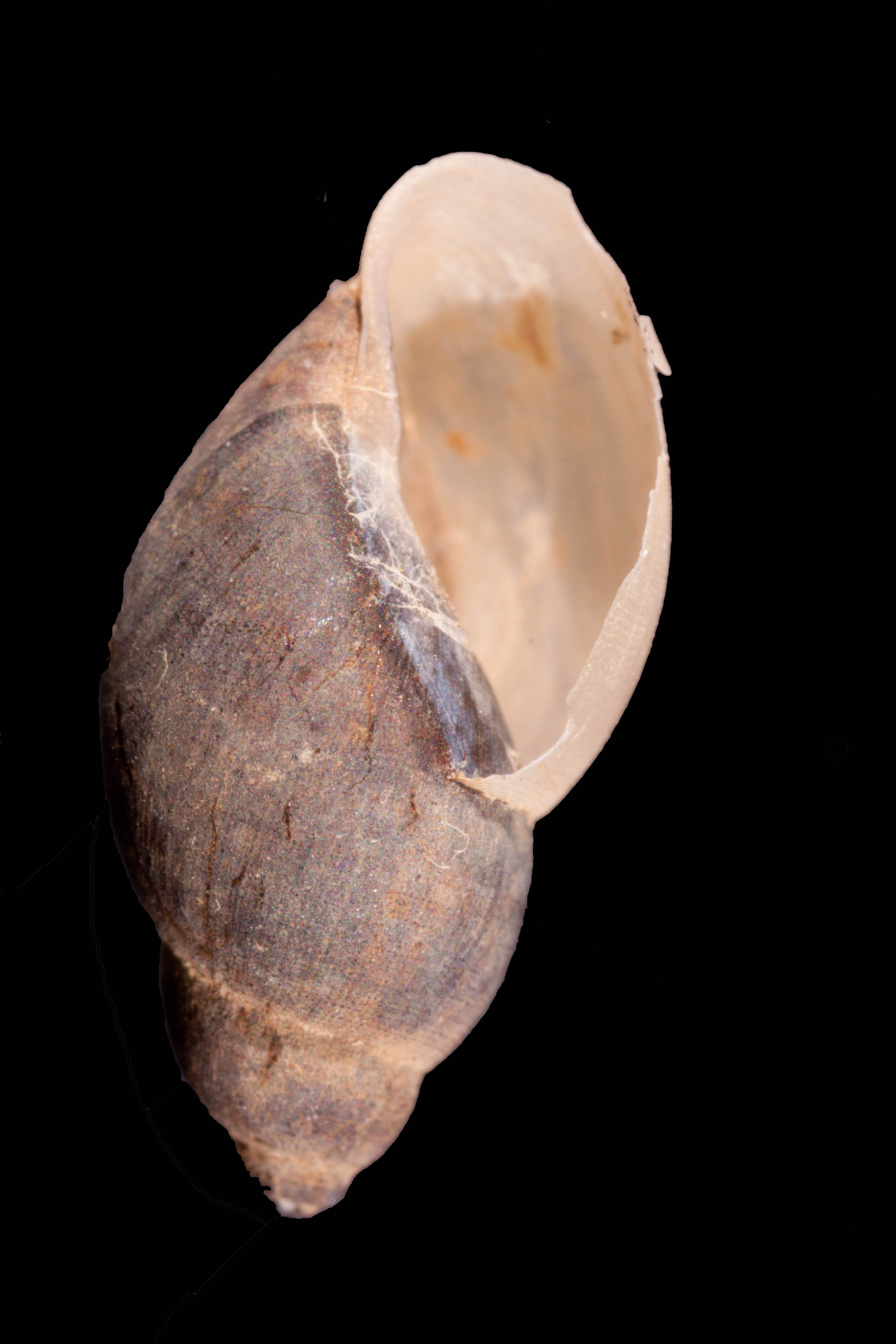
- The holotype

Scientific classification
- Kingdom: Animalia
- Phylum: Mollusca
- Class: Gastropoda
- Superorder: Hygrophila
- Family: Planorbidae
- Genus: Amerianna
- Species: A. pesigani

Binomial name
- Amerianna pesigani Hubendick, 1954

= Amerianna pesigani =

Species of gastropod

Amerianna pesigani is a species of freshwater snail in the family Planorbidae. It may be found on at least two islands in the Philippines.

== Taxonomy ==
Amerianna pesigani was first discovered on July 7, 1952 by Bengt Hubendick in the Tibok River near Palo, Leyte in the Philippines. Hubendick later formally described it as a new species in 1954.

Two specimens used in Hubendick's original description are housed in the collections of the Swedish Museum of Natural History. These specimens are the holotype (primary specimen) and one paratype (additional specimen).

== Description ==
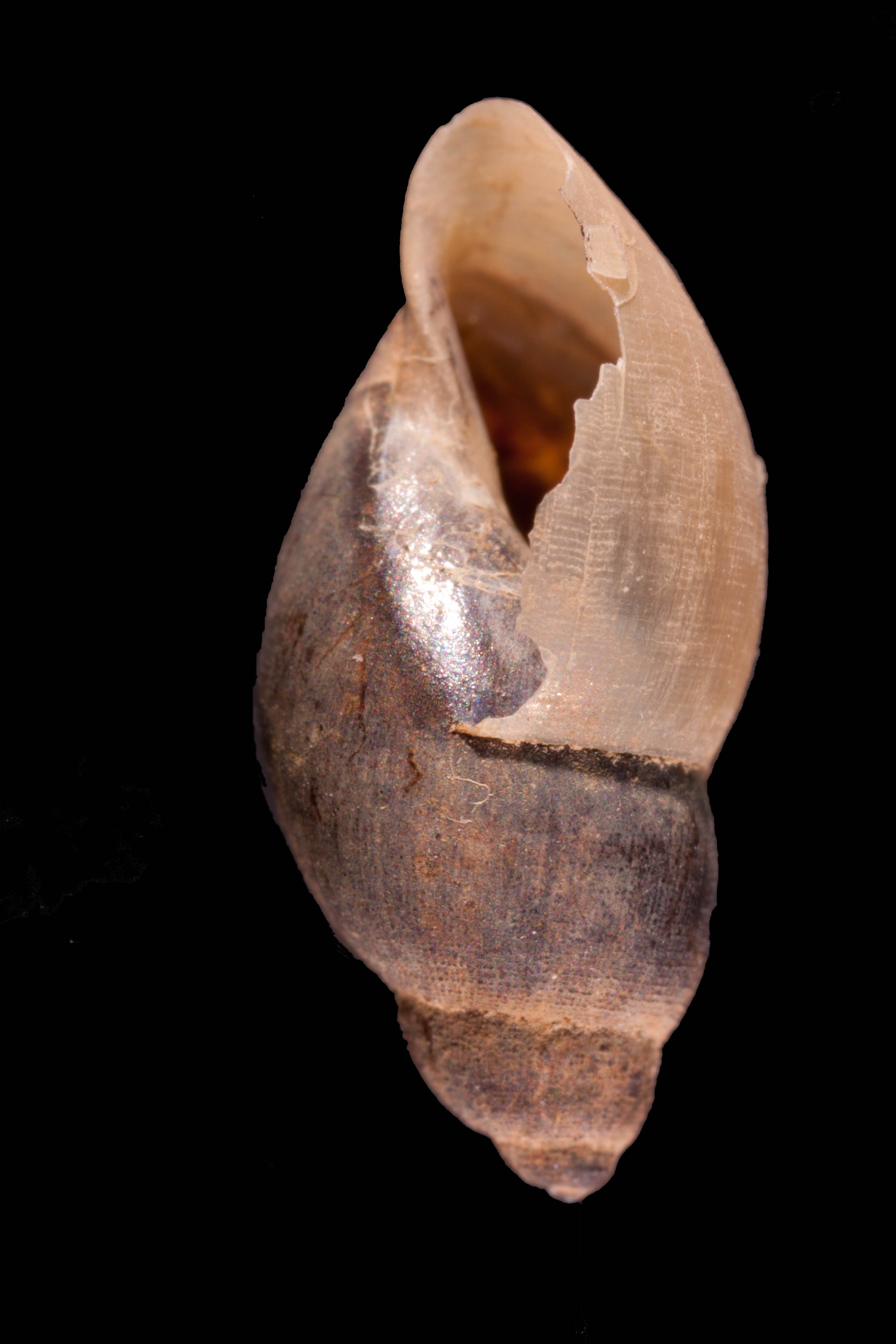
Side view

Like Amerianna buruana, A. pesigani has a reflected ureter, distinguishing it from the S-shaped ureter of Amerianna obesula and Amerianna leopoldi. In the mantle cavity, a short dorsal ridge and thin rectal ridge are present. The shape of the penis also helps to distinguish this species, as it is circular in this species. Additionally, the penial pore is not at the tip of the penis, as it is in the previously mentioned species.

== Distribution and ecology ==
Amerianna pesigani is native to the Philippines, being discovered in the Tibok River in Ortega, which is located on the island of Leyte, 7 km (4.3 mi) west of Palo. Additional specimens were found in fish ponds and rice fields on the island of Luzon in Tanay, Rizal.

A number of individuals from Tanay were examined to determine the prevalence of trematode parasites in the family Echinostomatidae, though none were found.
