= Odostomia kuiperi =

Scientific classification
- Kingdom: Animalia
- Phylum: Mollusca
- Class: Gastropoda
- Family: Pyramidellidae
- Genus: Odostomia
- Species: O. kuiperi

Binomial name
- Odostomia kuiperi (van Aartsen, Gittenberger & Goud, 1998)

Species of gastropod

Odostomia kuiperi is a species of sea snail, a marine gastropod mollusc in the family Pyramidellidae, the pyrams and their allies.

== Description ==
Odostomia kuiperi is a micromollusc, having a shell size that varies between 1.4mm and 1.8mm. It generally has a smooth, conical shell and a distinctive columellar tooth. They typically live in coastal waters up to 150 meters deep.

Odostomia kuiperi has a ectoparasitic feeding type, commonly hosting itself on polychaete worms, bivalves, and other molluscs.

== Anatomy ==
=== Shell ===
Most species in the genus Odostomia are marine gastropods with shells that are conical to elongate-ovate in shape and typically whitish or translucent in color, often appearing glossy under magnification. Members of the Pyramidellidae generally have shells with several moderately convex whorls forming a pointed spire, and although shell sculpture varies among species, many are smooth or bear only fine microscopic growth lines rather than strong ribs or spines. The aperture of these shells is usually oval, and a characteristic feature of the group is a plait on the columella within the shell opening. In Odostomia and closely related taxa, the umbilicus is absent or severely reduced. Because the shells of many Odostomia species are very similar and small, species-level identification typically requires close microscopic examination and comparison with type specimens. These features are typical of Odostomia and other pyramidellid snails.

=== Soft body ===
Like other members of the family Pyramidellidae, Odostomia kuiperi possesses a soft body that is adapted to a parasitic lifestyle. These snails lack a radula, the typical scraping organ found in most gastropods, and instead feed using a long, retractable proboscis that they insert into their invertebrate hosts to extract nutrients. The external anatomy of the soft body is relatively simple, with few distinguishing features, and is generally not visible unless the animal is fully extended and alive, making direct observation in natural settings difficult. These traits are characteristic of pyramidellid gastropods, which are specialized ectoparasites on other marine invertebrates such as bivalves and polychaete worms.

== Distribution ==
This species occurs in the following locations:

- Azores Exclusive Economic Zone
- European waters (ERMS scope)
