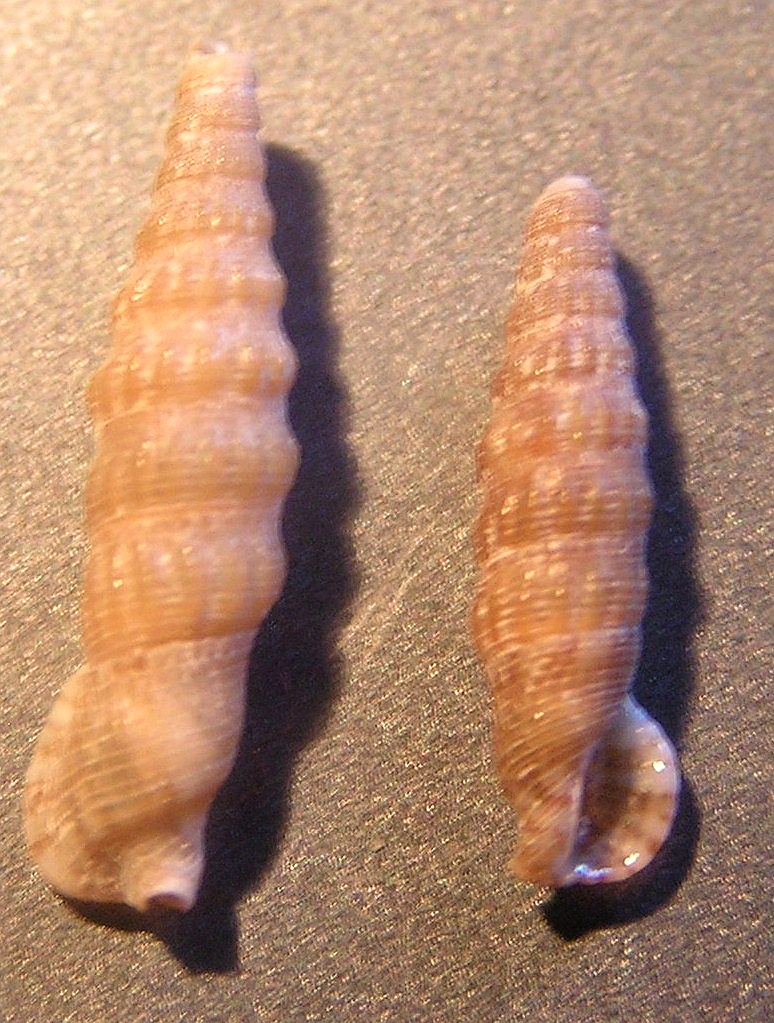

Scientific classification
- Kingdom: Animalia
- Phylum: Mollusca
- Class: Gastropoda
- Subclass: Caenogastropoda
- Order: incertae sedis
- Family: Cerithiidae
- Genus: Colina
- Species: C. macrostoma

Binomial name
- Colina macrostoma (Hinds, 1844)

Synonyms
- Cerithium (Colina) costatum G.B. Sowerby II, 1855; Cerithium (Colina) macrostoma Hinds, 1844; Cerithium coarctatum G.B. Sowerby II, 1866; Cerithium costiferum G.B. Sowerby II, 1855; Cerithium macrostoma Hinds, 1844; Cerithium pupaeforme (A. Adams in G.B. Sowerby II); Cerithium ringens Bayle, 1880; Colina pupiformis A. Adams, 1854; Colina pygmaea H. Adams, 1867

= Colina macrostoma =

Species of gastropod

Colina macrostoma is a species of sea snail, a marine gastropod mollusc in the family Cerithiidae.

== Description ==
Shell size 10 mm.

== Distribution ==
Northern Territory, Australia.
