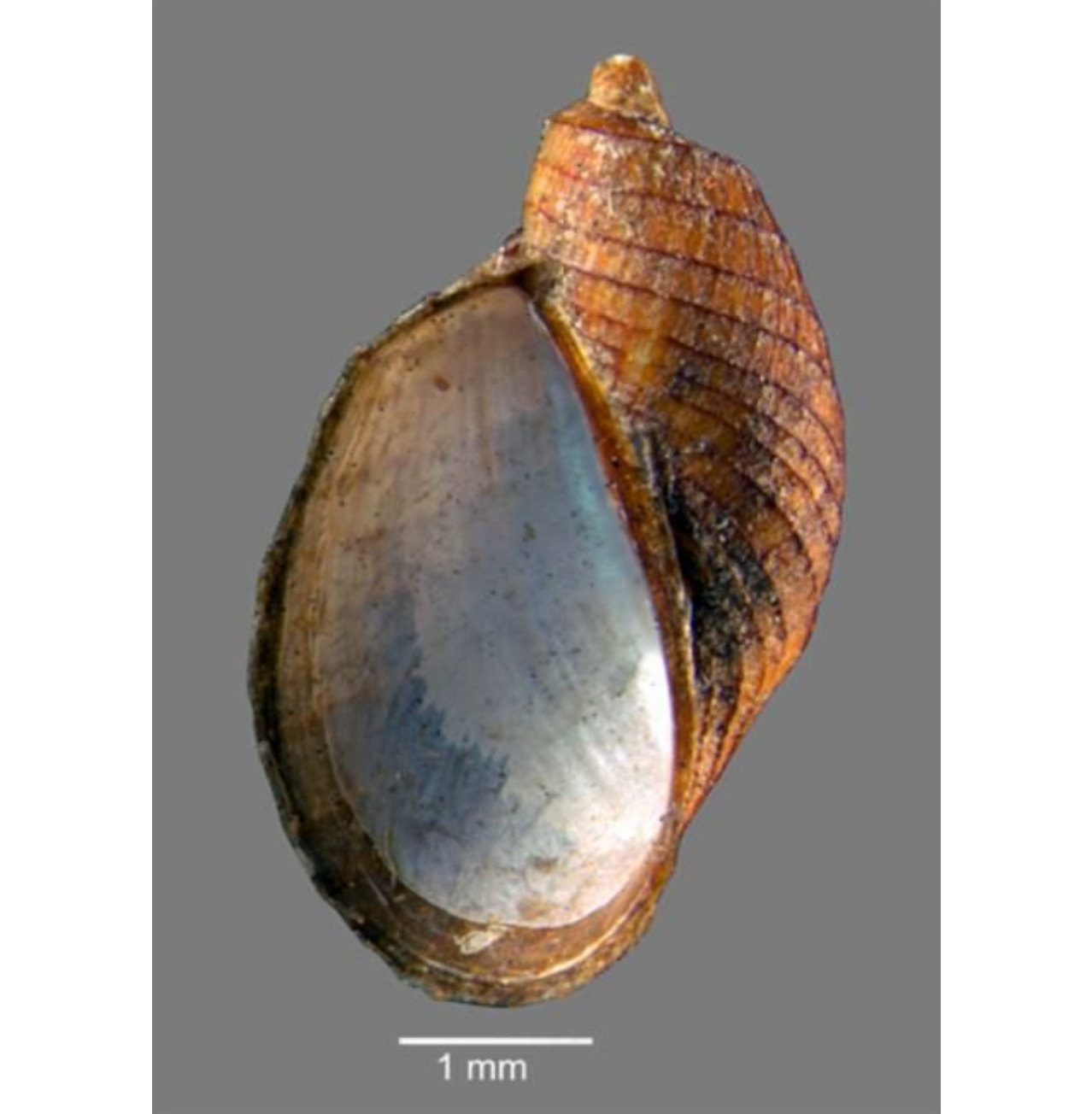

Conservation status
- Least Concern (IUCN 3.1)

Scientific classification
- Kingdom: Animalia
- Phylum: Mollusca
- Class: Gastropoda
- Superorder: Hygrophila
- Family: Planorbidae
- Genus: Bayardella
- Species: B. cosmeta

Binomial name
- Bayardella cosmeta (Iredale, 1943)

Synonyms
- Glyptamoda cosmeta Iredale, 1943; original combination

= Bayardella cosmeta =

Species of mollusc

Bayardella cosmeta is a small species of freshwater snail in the family Planorbidae. It is endemic to slow-moving waters in Australia, occupying a large area, but remaining somewhat rare. It has a lattice-like pattern of raised lines along its shell, and has a large shell opening. This species uses a unique method of aestivation to survive outside of water, without using an epiphragm.

== Taxonomy ==
Bayardella cosmeta was discovered in a lagoon near Tamsworth, Australia. It was first described by Tom Iredale in 1943, who placed it into the genus Glyptamoda, naming it Glyptamoda cosmeta. In 1977, scientists placed the species in the genus Camptoceras due to similarities in the reproductive tract. It was finally placed into the genus Bayardella in 1988, where it remains today.

The type specimen (the individual used in Iredale's original description), may be found in the collections of the Australian Museum in Sydney.

== Description ==
=== Shell characteristics ===
Bayardella cosmeta has a small, thin, brown shell measuring about 7 by 4 mm (0.28 by 0.16 in). Like the other Bayardella species, it has a sinistral shell, meaning it curls to the left. The shell makes three or four revolutions, called whorls. The shell is sculptured with thin lines called lirae or ribs, totalling 20 major and 20 minor lirae. Even finer lines may run perpendicular to the lirae, giving the shell a lattice-like appearance. The shell opening (aperture) is long, and oval shaped. The tip of the shell, called the spire, is short or medium-sized, but projects above the body of the shell, coming to a sharp point. The length of the spire may distinguish this species from Bayardella johni. A projection of the periostracum, the outermost layer of the shell, has been observed in this species. This projection folds over the edge of the aperture (lip).

=== Other characteristics ===
The radula, a toothy tongue-like organ, has some variance in the shape of the four-cusped central (rachidian) tooth. Some specimens are similar to B. johni, with cusps of unequal size. Others may have equally sized cusps. On each side of the rachidian tooth are 10 lateral teeth, followed by at least 11 more marginal teeth. The lateral teeth possess two large cusps and two or three smaller cusps. The marginal teeth begin when one cusp splits into two, though this splitting is not always observed. The number of cusps on the marginal teeth increases from four to six until tooth 18, by which the cusps begin fusing, and accessory cusps start growing.

B. cosmeta may be distinguished from B. johni by the presence of a two-lobed gill (pseudobranch). The animal's skin (mantle) is thick, and it has a small foot with long, straight tentacles. It may keep its body mostly inside its shell while moving.

== Distribution and habitat ==
Bayardella cosmeta is endemic to Australia, including New South Wales (where the species was first discovered), South Australia, Queensland, and the Northern Territory. In terms of watersheds, this snail may be found in the Murray-Darling and Lake Eyre basins. In Queensland, it is a rare but important species within the Pine Rivers Shire, as it may be used as an indicator species for water quality.

This species may live in slow-moving rivers or streams among a variety of substrates, including wood, leaves, and rocks, some of which are covered in algae. B. cosmeta has also been observed to aestivate outside of the water, in one case surviving dormancy for six months. The snails did not appear to create an epiphragm, but instead sealed their shells tightly against the substrate, making this species the first to be recorded using this alternative aestivation method. It may share its habitat with other molluscs, including Plotiopsis balonnensis, Glyptophysa aliciae, Pettancylus petterdi, and a species of Isidorella.

== Conservation ==
Though rare in parts of its range, Bayardella cosmeta is categorized as Least Concern by the IUCN. This is partly due to its range, which includes national parks, reserves, and waterways of high quality. Additionally, the species is somewhat tolerant of pollution. Population sizes and trends are not known, however.

This species faces threats of habitat degradation due to water management, climate change, invasive species, and increasing salinity. It does not have any specific conservation plans, but may benefit from habitat restoration projects occurring in both of the watersheds it inhabits.
