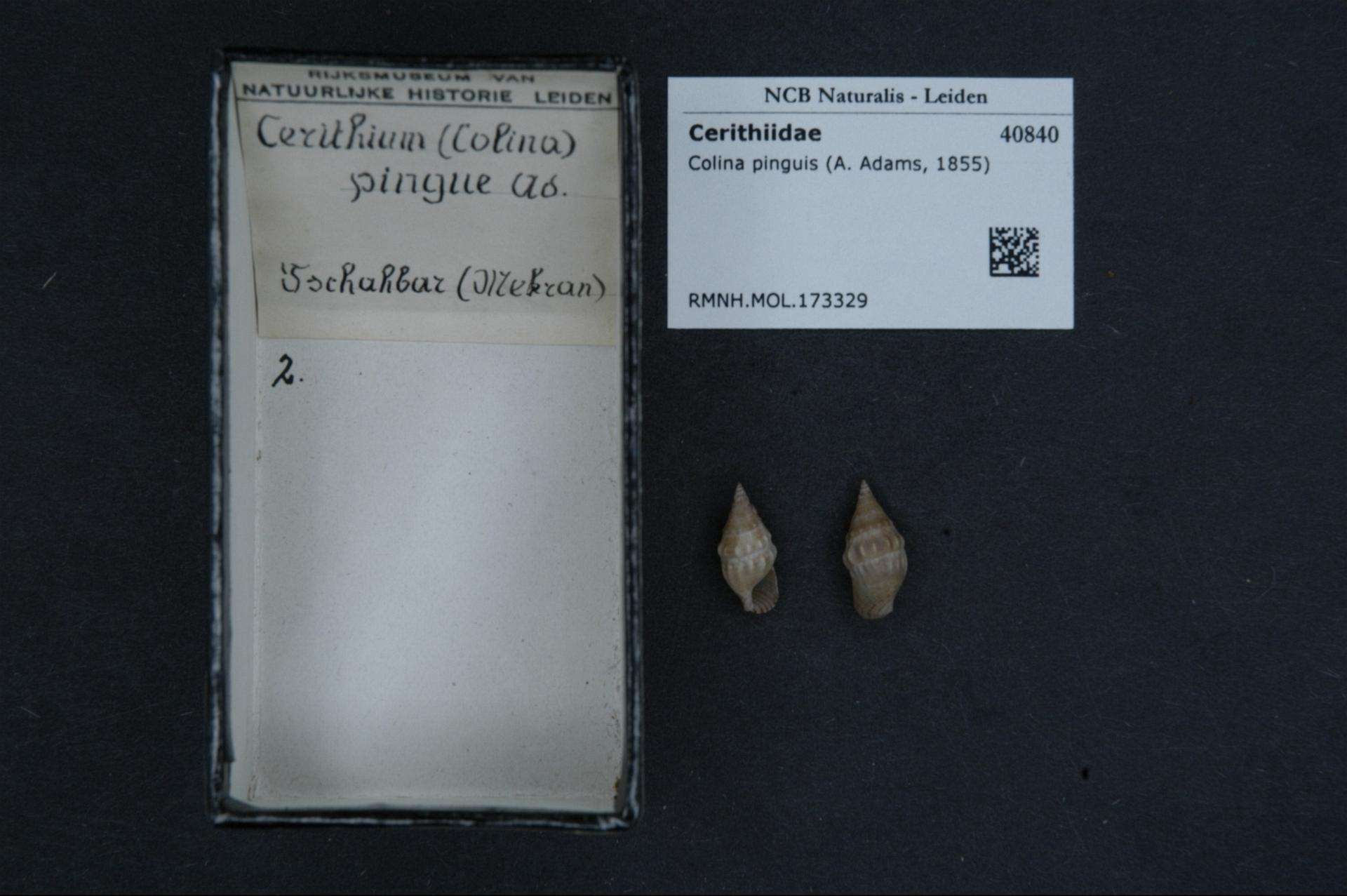

Scientific classification
- Kingdom: Animalia
- Phylum: Mollusca
- Class: Gastropoda
- Subclass: Caenogastropoda
- Order: incertae sedis
- Family: Cerithiidae
- Genus: Colina
- Species: C. pinguis

Binomial name
- Colina pinguis (A. Adams, 1855)

Synonyms
- Cerithium (Colina) pingue A. Adams, 1855; Cerithium contractum G.B. Sowerby II, 1855; Cerithium crumena Bayle, 1880; Cerithium pingue A. Adams, 1855; Cerithium pinguis Adams, 1854; Cerithium taeniatum G.B. Sowerby II, 1865; Colina perimensis Jousseaume, 1930

= Colina pinguis =

Species of gastropod

Colina pinguis is a species of sea snail, a marine gastropod mollusk in the family Cerithiidae.

There is one subspecies: Colina pinguis madagascariensis Bozzetti, 2008
