= Colina ciclostoma =

Scientific classification
- Kingdom: Animalia
- Phylum: Mollusca
- Class: Gastropoda
- Subclass: Caenogastropoda
- Order: incertae sedis
- Family: Cerithiidae
- Genus: Colina
- Species: C. ciclostoma

Binomial name
- Colina ciclostoma Bozzetti, 2008

Species of gastropod

Colina ciclostoma is a species of sea snail, a marine gastropod mollusk in the family Cerithiidae.
