= Amerianna leopoldi =

Conservation status
- Near Threatened (IUCN 3.1)

Scientific classification
- Kingdom: Animalia
- Phylum: Mollusca
- Class: Gastropoda
- Superorder: Hygrophila
- Family: Planorbidae
- Genus: Amerianna
- Species: A. leopoldi

Binomial name
- Amerianna leopoldi (Dupuis, 1931)

Synonyms
- Ameria leopoldi Dupuis, 1931; original combination; Ameria leopoldi var. exersta Dupuis, 1931; junior subjective synonym; Amerianna leopoldi var. exersta (Dupuis, 1931)

Species of gastropod

Amerianna leopoldi is a relatively small species of freshwater snail in the family Planorbidae. It is named after King Leopold III of Belgium, but lives in a single lake in the Arfak Mountains of Indonesia at high elevations. It has a uniquely shaped shell where the apex is concave, concealed by the body whorl. It is considered a near-threatened species.

== Taxonomy ==
Amerianna leopoldi was first discovered on March 9, 1929 in the Arfak Mountains in modern day Indonesia. It was subsequently described in 1931 by Paul Dupuis, though it was given the name Ameria leopoldi. Dupuis additionally described a larger variety of the animal, giving it the name Ameria leopoldi var. exersta. This variation is no longer accepted as being a valid classification. Phylogenetically, A. leopoldi is the sister taxa for a yet unnamed (as of 2026) species of Amerianna.

The name "leopoldi" is a tribute to King Leopold III of Belgium.

2 type specimens (cotypes) from Dupuis's original description are found in the collections of the Royal Belgian Institute of Natural Sciences.

== Description ==
The pale brown, translucent shell of Amerianna leopoldi is about 9.5 mm (0.37 in) long, though specimens as large as 11 mm (0.43 in) have been described. It is left-coiling (sinistral), with 3 shell revolutions (whorls). The top of the shell (apex) is concave, surrounded entirely by the body whorl. This characteristic shell shape is considered unique enough to identify the species. The outer layer of the shell, called the periostracum, may be hairy. The radula, a toothy tongue-like structure, is similar to other planorbid species, with one cusp on the middle column of teeth (lateral teeth).

Unlike other Amerianna species, the gill (pseudobranch) of A. leopoldi is not divided into a distinct front and back section. The ureter is S-shaped, distinguishing it from those of A. buruana and A. pesigani. Additionally, there have been no dorsal, renal, or rectal ridges observed in the mantle cavity, a space formed by the folding of the skin, which contains several organs. This further distinguishes it from A. buruana, A. pesigani, and A. obesula, which all have at least one ridge. A. leopoldi may additionally be distinguished by its triangular penis.

== Distribution ==
Amerianna leopoldi is known from the Arfak Mountains in West Papua, Indonesia, where it was discovered at an elevation of 2 km (1.2 mi) above sea level. There, it inhabits a single lake, occupying a total area of 40 km^{2} (15 mi^{2}). Currently, the species does not face many significant threats, though tourism, pollution, and habitat destruction may threaten it in the future. For these reasons, the IUCN listed this species as near threatened in 2026.
