= Glyptophysa petiti =

Conservation status
- Data Deficient (IUCN 3.1)

Scientific classification
- Kingdom: Animalia
- Phylum: Mollusca
- Class: Gastropoda
- Superorder: Hygrophila
- Family: Planorbidae
- Genus: Glyptophysa
- Species: G. petiti

Binomial name
- Glyptophysa petiti (Crosse, 1872)

Synonyms
- Glyptophysa (Glyptophysa) petiti (Crosse, 1872); Physa petiti (Crosse, 1872)

Species of gastropod

Glyptophysa petiti is a species of small sinistral (left-handed) air-breathing freshwater snail, aquatic pulmonate gastropod mollusks in the family Planorbidae.

This species as presently delimited is endemic to New Caledonia. However, it may include taxa found elsewhere, such as G. aliciae of Australia.

The New Caledonian population had been previously classified as endangered because it is only known from the type locality, Lac de la Grande Vallée des Kaoris in southern New Caledonia. However, owing to the taxonomic uncertainty, the species is now classified as data deficient by the IUCN.
