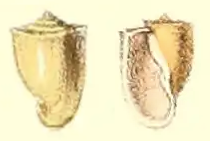

Conservation status
- Least Concern (IUCN 3.1)

Scientific classification
- Kingdom: Animalia
- Phylum: Mollusca
- Class: Gastropoda
- Superorder: Hygrophila
- Family: Planorbidae
- Genus: Amerianna
- Species: A. obesula

Binomial name
- Amerianna obesula Iredale, 1943

Synonyms
- Physa (Ameria) obesa H. Adams, 1861; junior homonym of Physa obesa De Kay, 1843

= Amerianna obesula =

Species of gastropod

Amerianna obesula, the obese pouch snail, is a species of Australian freshwater snail in the family Planorbidae. It has a wide, short shell with a flat end.

== Taxonomy ==
This species was originally described as Physa (Ameria) obesa in 1861 by Henry Adams. However, a previous scientist had already named another species Physa obesa in 1843, and so in 1943, when the species was transferred to the genus Amerianna, the specific name was changed to obesula.

Some sources suggest that this species may not be valid, instead being a phenotypic variation of Amerianna carinata. Other sources state the two species to be synonymous outright. Still others consider them to be distinct.

The species was originally described from the Fitzroy River in Queensland, Australia.

== Description ==
The shell of Amerianna obesula has been described as a light brown, brownish green, or rust-colored. It is wider than it is tall, with 3 whorls (revolutions of the shell). Each whorl is angled or keeled, with the backside being flat. The spire, a structure formed by stacks of whorls, is notably short, barely protruding above the shell's flat surface. The final whorl is wide, and nearly comes to a point at the animal's front end. The aperture (shell opening) is wide and somewhat oval-shaped, with the backside forming a right angle. The inside of the shell is slightly pink, and the columella (central pillar) possesses a twisting plait.

This species may be distinguished from all others in the genus by the way the apex of the shell protrudes above the other whorls. In other Amerianna species, the apex does not generally protrude, except in one population of Amerianna carinata.

== Distribution and habitat ==
Amerianna obesula is known from and endemic to the Eastern part of Queensland, Australia, where it is somewhat common. It is found in freshwater habitats along the coast. Specific occurrences have been recorded from the Fitzroy River in Queensland, where the species was originally discovered, as well as Yeppoon Lagoon. The habitat of this species faces threats due to development and degradation, but the effects of this on the species is unknown.
