= Bayardella =

Scientific classification
- Domain: Eukaryota
- Kingdom: Animalia
- Phylum: Mollusca
- Class: Gastropoda
- Superorder: Hygrophila
- Family: Planorbidae
- Subfamily: Miratestinae
- Genus: Bayardella; Burch, 1977

Genus of gastropods

Bayardella is a genus of small, neritiform cylindrical shelled gastropods belonging to the family Planorbidae. They are native and endemic to Australia. Species of Bayardella, like other Planorbids, are non-operculate.

== Description ==
The aperture (shell mouth) is typically almost as long as the entire shell with some specimens being described as 'almost abalone-shaped'. The species of Bayardella, when adult, often display medium-sized shells that are usually 5-9mm in size. The shells often display heavy spiral ridges on the periostracum, have a deep umbilicus and have a margin to the columellar that is reflected and curved slightly but without a fold. The shells of Bayardella, like other Planorbids, are typically sinistral.

== Ecology ==
Bayardella can be found living on the underside of stones and pieces of wood (i.e. fallen logs or branches) in the upper reaches of small streams and waterholes. Bayardella cf. johni has also been observed living in the lower freshwater reaches of the Ross River, Townsville, Queensland. Due to the ephemeral nature of many of Bayardella's habitats, Bayardella are able to aestivate on the underside of hard surfaces such as rocks and large pieces of wood.

== Distribution ==
Bayardella are endemic to the Australian mainland. Bayardella are found in Western Australia, South Australia, the Northern Territory, Queensland, Victoria and New South Wales. However, Bayardella are only found in large populations on rare occasion in the Northern Territory. Elsewhere, they are found in small, often ephemeral populations.

== List of species ==
Currently, there are two described species belonging to the genus Bayardella.

- Bayardella cosmeta (Iredale, 1943)
- Bayardella johni Burch, 1977

Type species: Plesiophysa (Bayardella) johni Burch, 1977 = Bayardella johni Burch, 1977

Original reference: Burch, J.B. (1977). A new freshwater snail (Basommatophora : Planorbidae) from Australia, Plesiophysa (Bayardella) johni. Malacological Review 10: 79-80.

Type locality: Isdell River, Walcott Inlet, north Western Australia.

NOTE: The Australian Museum also recognises at least one undescribed of Bayardella.
