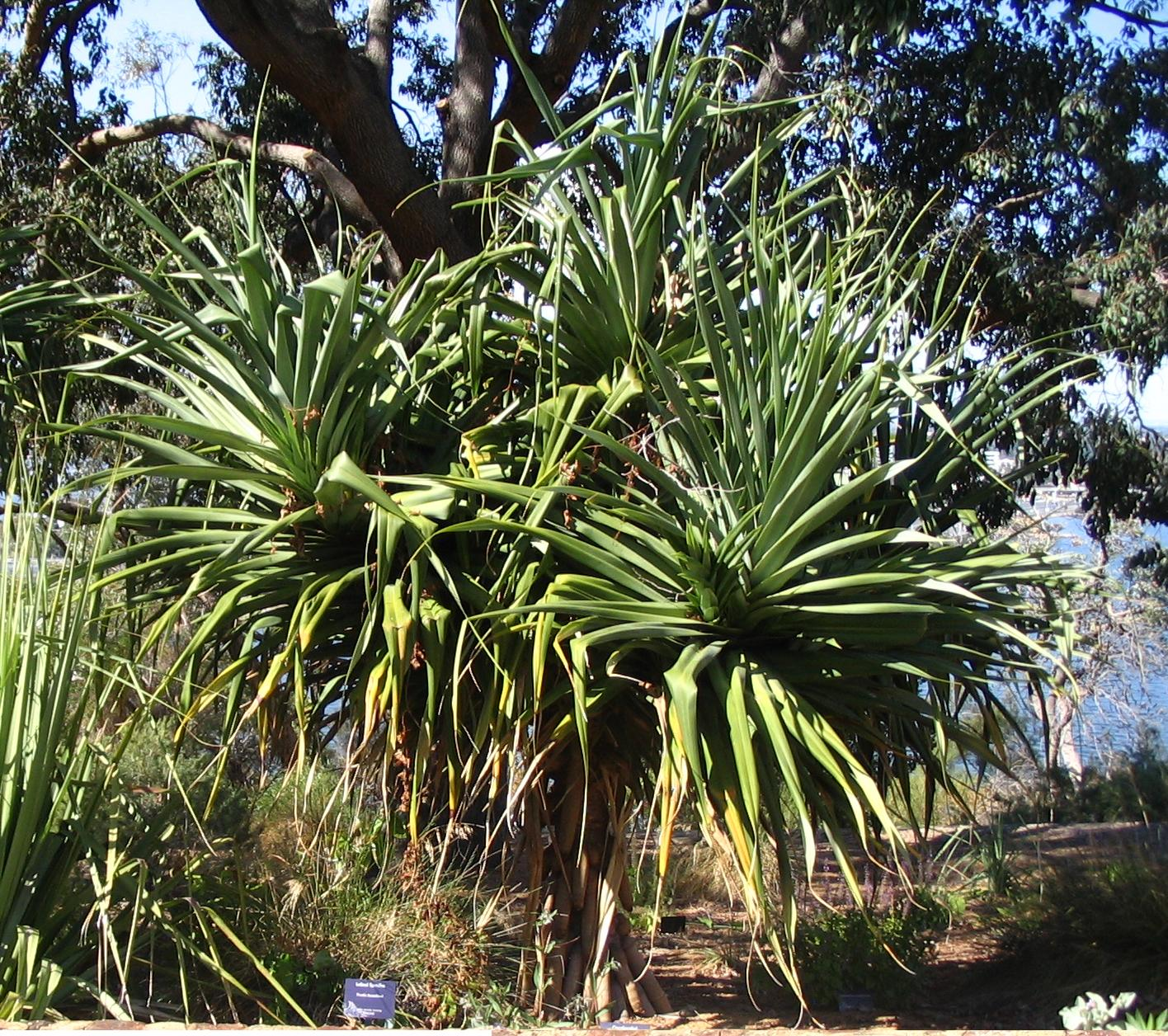

Scientific classification
- Kingdom: Plantae
- Clade: Tracheophytes
- Clade: Angiosperms
- Clade: Monocots
- Order: Pandanales
- Family: Pandanaceae
- Genus: Pandanus
- Species: P. aquaticus

Binomial name
- Pandanus aquaticus F.Muell.

= Pandanus aquaticus =

Species of plant

Pandanus aquaticus (native name andjimdjim) is a species of Pandanus in the family Pandanaceae, endemic to the more humid regions of Northern Territory of Australia. It is confined to the river shallows and areas subject to flooding. It is a small tree growing to about 6 metres (20 ft) height. As with most pandans it has downward-arching prop roots, which in this case can be permanently in water like a mangrove.
