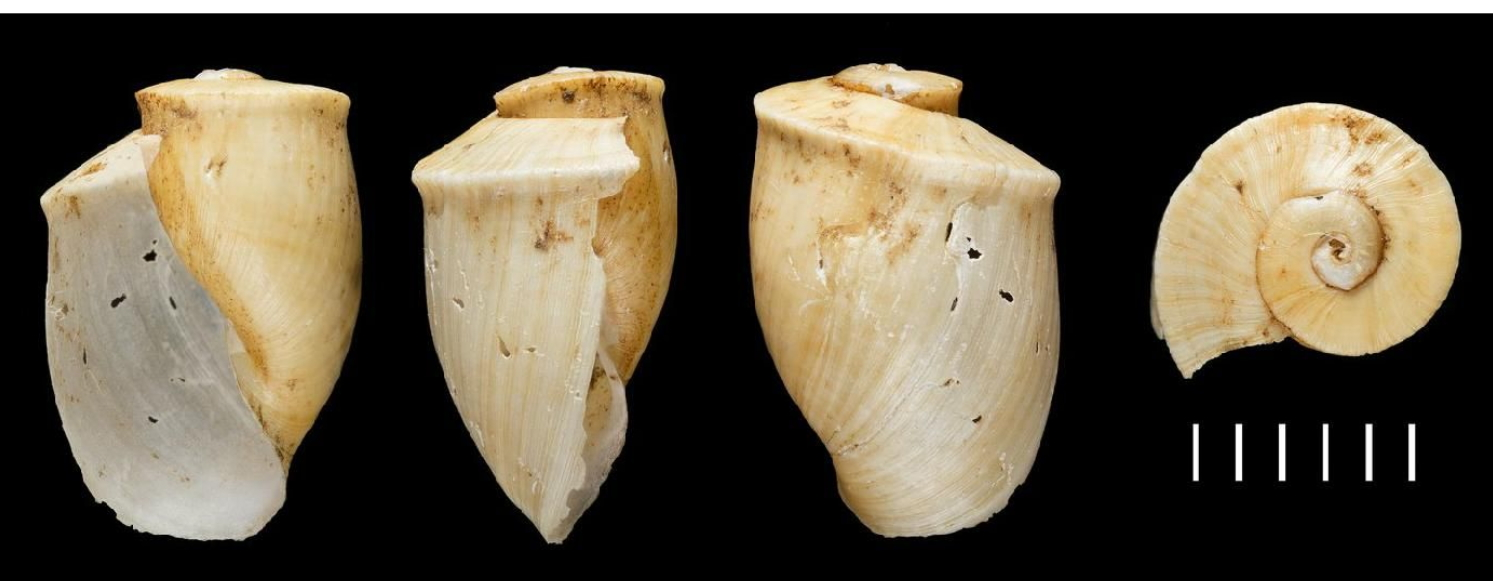
- The shell of Amerianna carinata

Scientific classification
- Kingdom: Animalia
- Phylum: Mollusca
- Class: Gastropoda
- Superorder: Hygrophila
- Family: Planorbidae
- Subfamily: Miratestinae
- Genus: Amerianna; Strand, 1928

Type species
- Physa (Ameria) carinata H. Adams, 1861

Synonyms
- Ameria H. Adams, 1861; junior homonym; Amerianna (Ameriella) Cotton, 1943; junior subjective synonym; Ameriella Cotton, 1943; junior subjective synonym; Physa (Ameria) H. Adams, 1861; junior homonym

= Amerianna =

Genus of gastropods

Amerianna is a genus of freshwater snails in the family Planorbidae. These species typically possess shells with large openings and flat backs, and have grey skin. They may be found across a large area of the Southwest Pacific Ocean, most notably Australia.

== Taxonomy ==
The genus Amerianna was first described in 1861 as a subgenus of Physa, as Physa (Ameria). It included 5 species, all of which were newly described. In 1928, it was promoted to a full genus, and was also moved to the family Planorbidae, where it remains today. A 1943 paper named the subgenus Amerianna (Ameriella), but it is no longer considered valid.

The type species is Amerianna carinata.

== Description ==
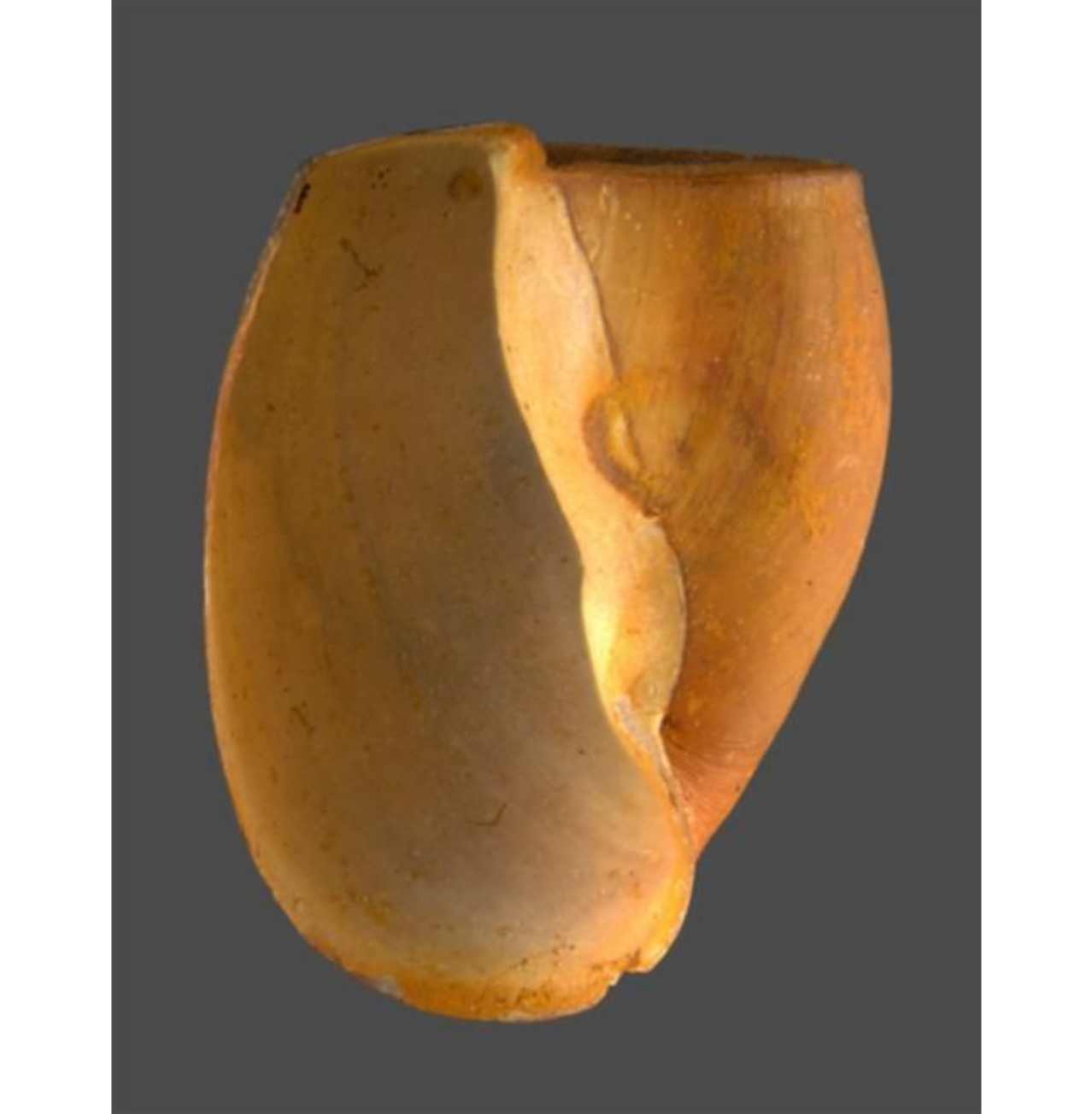
The flat, angled spire of Amerianna reevii

=== Shell characteristics ===
Species in this genus have left-coiling (sinistral) shells, where each shell revolution (whorl) is usually flattened and angular at the posterior of the shell. Typically, a very short or concave spire is present. The shell opening (aperture) is nearly as long as the shell itself. The edge (lip) of the aperture is angled at the back of the animal, and rounded towards the front. The inside edge of the shell (the columella) is slightly folded. Hairs may be present on the outside of the shell in a spiral arrangement, especially in immature individuals.

Sometimes, the back of the shell will be rounded instead of angled, as in the case of Amerianna cumingii.

=== Other characteristics ===
The penis is not branched, and possesses a pore on either the tip or the side. The penis sheath is hardly distinguishable from the preputium, and there are no accessory organs. The preputium is folded along its internal wall. The bursa copulatrix (sperm-storing organ) is long and oval-shaped, and is located at the far end of the vagina.

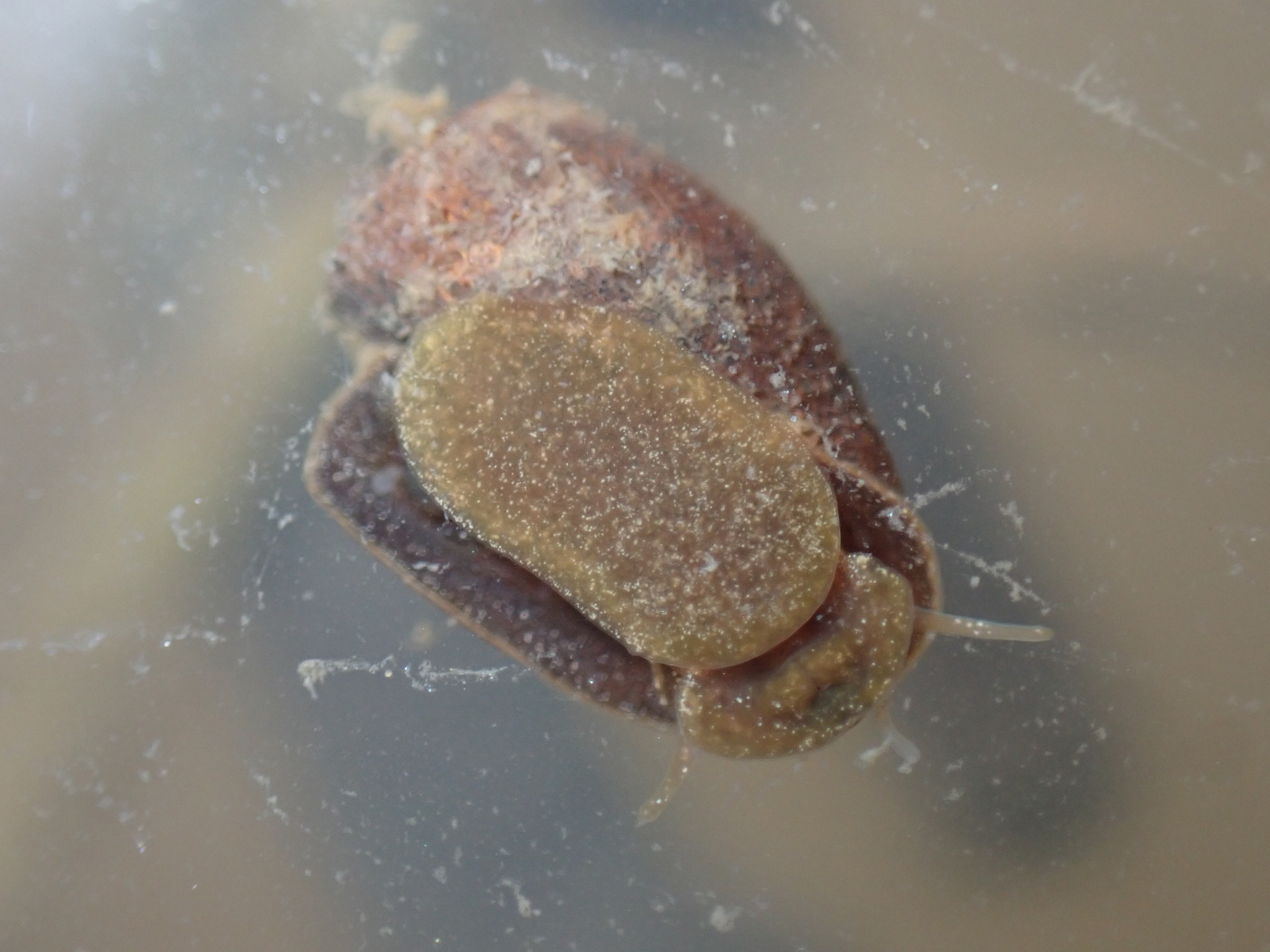
The grey mantle of Amerianna compar

The skin (mantle) of the animal is typically highly pigmented, appearing grey in coloration. The gill (pseudobranch) is highly folded, and joins to the mantle towards the front of the animal.

The radula (toothy tongue-like appendage) has more than 24 teeth per row. The central (rachidian) tooth has two cusps of equal size. Bordering the rachidian tooth on each side are 12 lateral teeth. Each lateral tooth has three cusps, which are of unequal size. At the far edge of the radula lie the marginal teeth, which are similar to the lateral teeth, but with more branching of the cusps. The similarities between the radulae of Amerianna and the genus Planorbis were used as justification for its movement to the family Planorbidae.

== Distribution and habitat ==
Species in this genus are found in fresh water, and though most are native to Australia, at least 3 species may be found on other islands in the Southwest Pacific.

== Species ==
The number of species in the genus is debated, but nonetheless includes:

- † Amerianna angularis L.-S. Huang, 1987
- Amerianna buruana (van Benthem Jutting, 1927)
- Amerianna carinata (H.Adams, 1861)
- Amerianna compar Iredale, 1943
- Amerianna cumingii (H. Adams, 1861)
- † Amerianna duboisi (van Benthem Jutting, 1937)
- Amerianna leopoldi (Dupuis, 1931)
- Amerianna obesula Iredale, 1943
- Amerianna obiana (Rolle, 1903)
- Amerianna papyracea (G. B. Sowerby II, 1874)
- Amerianna pesigani Hubendick, 1954
- Amerianna reevii (A. Adams & Angas, 1864)

=== Synonyms ===
Subgenus:

- Amerianna (Ameriella) Cotton, 1943; accepted as Amerianna Strand, 1928

Species:

- Amerianna bonushenricus (A. Adams & Angas, 1864); accepted as Amerianna cumingii (H. Adams, 1861)
- Amerianna gabrieli Cotton, 1942; accepted as Amerianna reevii (A. Adams & Angas, 1864)
- Amerianna pyramidata (G. B. Sowerby II, 1873); accepted as Glyptophysa gibbosa (A. A. Gould, 1847)
- Amerianna subacuta Cotton & Beasley, 1941; accepted as Glyptophysa novahollandica (Bowdich, 1822)
- Amerianna tenuistriata (G. B. Sowerby II, 1873); accepted as Glyptophysa novahollandica (Bowdich, 1822)
