= Hermann Rolle =

German entomologist (1864–1929)

Franz Hermann Rolle (17 September 1864 Freiburg im Breisgau – 12 May 1929, Berlin-Schöneberg) was a German natural history dealer and malacologist.

From 1889, Rolle was a natural history dealer in Berlin trading as Institute Kosmos. He sold bird and insect specimens to many museums and private collectors especially to Alexander Koenig. When he retired his entomological collections were sold to Eugène Le Moult, Paris in 1921/22.
