= Amerianna buruana =

Conservation status
- Vulnerable (IUCN 3.1)

Scientific classification
- Kingdom: Animalia
- Phylum: Mollusca
- Class: Gastropoda
- Superorder: Hygrophila
- Family: Planorbidae
- Genus: Amerianna
- Species: A. buruana

Binomial name
- Amerianna buruana (van Benthem Jutting, 1927)

Synonyms
- Ameria buruana van Benthem Jutting, 1927

Species of gastropod

Amerianna buruana is a small species of freshwater snail in the family Planorbidae. It inhabits only a single mountainous lake on the island of Buru in Indonesia. It is considered a vulnerable species.

== Taxonomy ==
Amerianna buruana was originally described in 1927 as Ameria buruana by W. S. S. van Benthem Jutting. It was discovered on the island of Buru, Indonesia.

At least 2 specimens have been preserved, both of which are housed in the Zoological Museum of Amsterdam. One syntype and the radula (toothy tongue) from a paratype are known.

== Description ==
Like other Amerianna species, Amerianna buruana has a left-coiling (sinistral) shell with a short spire. It differs from other species in the genus in its mantle cavity, a space formed by the folding of the skin, which contains several organs. A. buruana and A. pesigani both have a reflected ureter (as opposed to S-shaped), and a short dorsal ridge. A. buruana additionally has a short renal ridge and a prominent rectal ridge. The penis of this species is somewhat rectangular in cross-section. This species is very small, less than 1 cm (0.39 in) in length.

== Distribution ==
Specimens have been collected from the mountain Lake Rana in Buru, Indonesia. The island is also considered to be its type locality, or the place of its original description. This is its only known location, and therefore may become threatened with habitat destruction if development occurs. For this reason, the IUCN listed this species as vulnerable in 2026.
