= Henry Adams (zoologist) =

British malacologist (1813–1877)

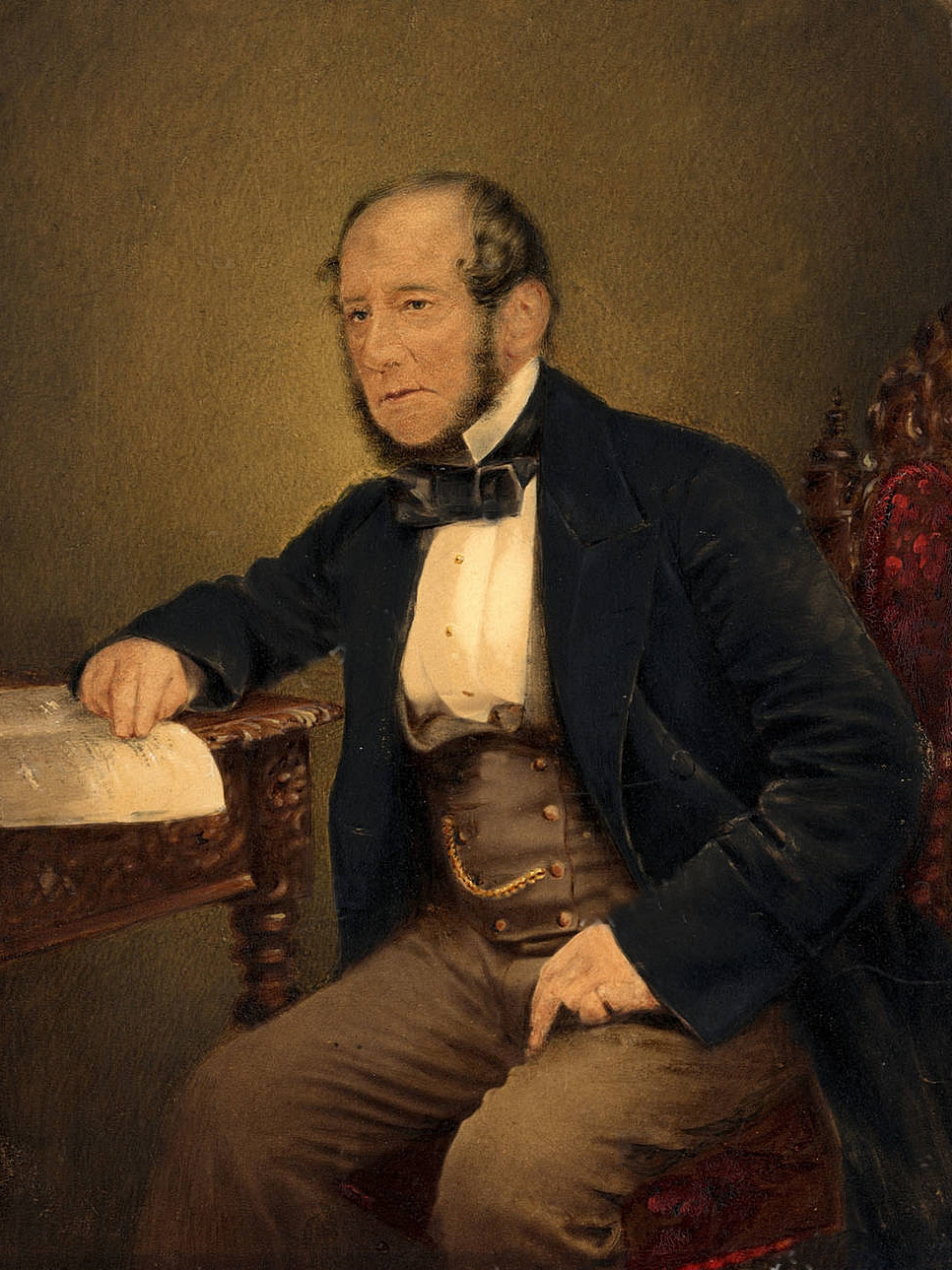
- Born: 1813; British Empire; Gosport, Hampshire
- Died: 1877 (aged 63–64); Gosport
- Relatives: Arthur Adams (brother)
- Scientific career
- Fields: Conchology
- Author abbrev. (zoology): H. Adams

Henry Adams (1813–1877) was an English naturalist and conchologist.

With his brother Arthur Adams, also a noted conchologist, he wrote The genera of recent Mollusca: arranged according to their organization three volumes, 1858.

His father is an architect hired by HM Customs.
