= Plait (gastropod) =

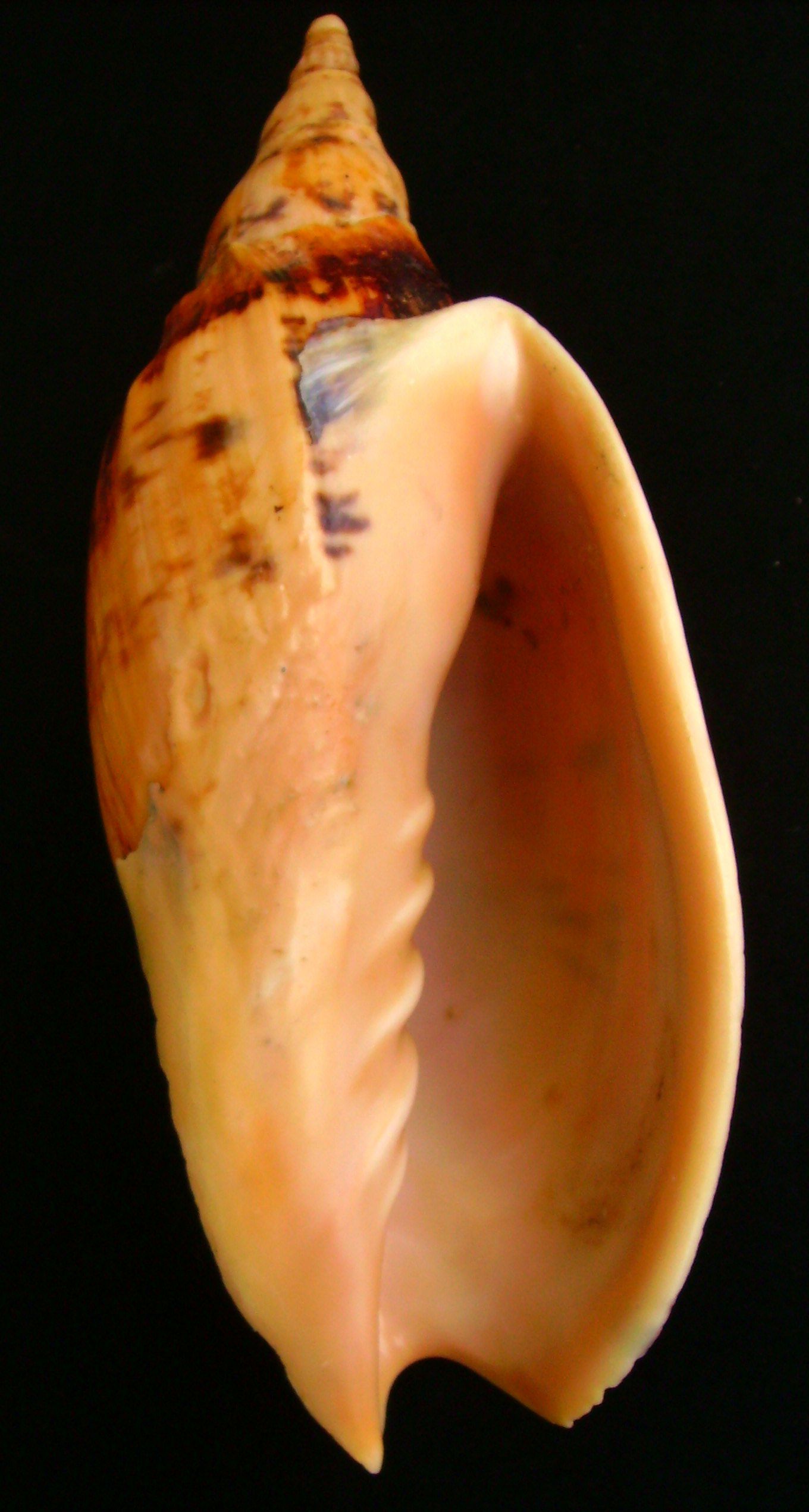
The aperture of the shell of Alcithoe swainsoni shows five plaits on the columella, four strong and one weak

A plait is an anatomical feature which is present on the shells of some snails, or gastropods. This sculpture occurs often in the shells of marine gastropod mollusks in the clade Neogastropoda, but it is also found in some pulmonate land snails.

Plaits are folds on the columella (also known as the pillar or axis) at the center of the shell. The columella (meaning little column) is the central structure around which the whorls of a coiled gastropod shell are coiled.

The presence or absence of plaits, and the number of plaits, are characteristics used in the description of many gastropod molluscs, often enabling similar species to be separated and identified correctly.
