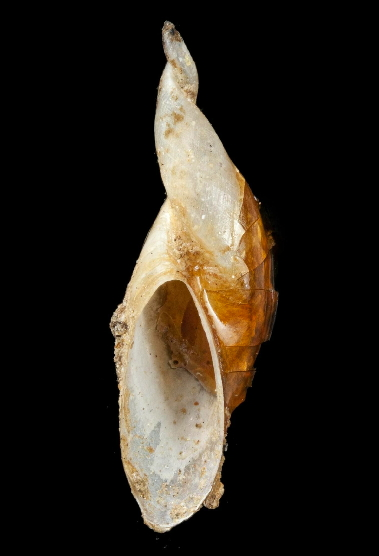
- Camptoceras terebra

Scientific classification
- Kingdom: Animalia
- Phylum: Mollusca
- Class: Gastropoda
- Superorder: Hygrophila
- Family: Planorbidae
- Genus: Camptoceras; Benson, 1843

= Camptoceras =

Genus of gastropods

Camptoceras is a genus of air-breathing freshwater snails with sinistral shells, aquatic pulmonate gastropod mollusks in the family Planorbidae. It was described in 1843 by William Henry Benson.

== Taxonomy ==
Camptoceras was described in 1843 by William Henry Benson as a monotypic genus, with C. terebra as the type species. Originally, the genus was placed within the family Helicidae, and the subfamily Lymnaeinae. Debates ensued as to whether this new genus was aquatic (in the family Physidae) or terrestrial (in the family Succineidae). It was first placed into the aquatic family Planorbidae in 1919 on account of its eyes, shell, teeth and jaws. In 1974, it was placed in the subfamily Camptoceratinae, though this taxonomy is not always recognized.

The genus Culmenella was once a subgenus of Camptoceras. The characters that distinguish the two genera may not be significant, but include the shape of the salivary glands, the arrangements of the teeth, the width of the penis, and differences in an accessory organ called the accessory preputial gland.

== Species ==
Species within the genus Camptoceras include:

- Camptoceras austeni H. F. Blanford, 1871
- Camptoceras hirasei Walker, 1919
- Camptoceras terebra Benson, 1843

=== Taxonomic synonyms ===
- Subgenera
  - Camptoceras (Culmenella) Clench, 1927: synonym of Culmenella
- Species
  - Camptoceras (Culmenella) jiraponi Hubendick, 1967: synonym of Culmenella jiraponi (Hubendick, 1967) (unaccepted combination)
  - Camptoceras (Culmenella) prashadi Clench, 1931: synonym of Culmenella prashadi (Clench, 1931)
  - Camptoceras jiraponi Hubendick, 1967: synonym of Culmenella jiraponi (original combination)
  - Camptoceras lineatum H. F. Blanford, 1871: synonym of Culmenella lineata (H. F. Blanford, 1871)
  - Camptoceras obtusum Godwin-Austin, 1882 †: synonym of Camptoceratops priscus (Godwin-Austen, 1882) †
  - Camptoceras priscum Godwin-Austen, 1882 †: synonym of Camptoceratops priscus (Godwin-Austen, 1882) † (superseded combination)
  - Camptoceras subspinosum Annandale & Prashad, 1920: synonym of Culmenella subspinosa (Annandale & Prashad, 1920) (original combination)
