= Eostrobilops hirasei =

Scientific classification
- Kingdom: Animalia
- Phylum: Mollusca
- Class: Gastropoda
- Order: Stylommatophora
- Family: Strobilopsidae
- Genus: Eostrobilops
- Species: E. hirasei

Binomial name
- Eostrobilops hirasei (Pilsbry, 1908)
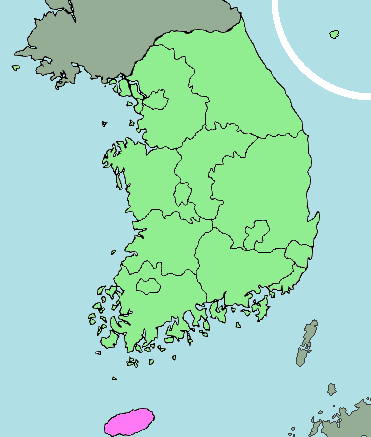
- Range of Eostrobilops hirasei: Jeju Island, lying south off the coast of South Korea.

Synonyms
- Strobilops hirasei Pilsbry, 1908

Species of gastropod

Eostrobilops hirasei is a species of air-breathing land snail, a terrestrial pulmonate gastropod mollusk in the family Strobilopsidae.

The specific name is apparently in honor either of the Japanese malacologist Yoichiro Hirase (1859–1925) or of his son Shintaro Hirase (1884–1939).

== Taxonomy ==
Eostrobilops hirasei was discovered and described under the name Strobilops hirasei by the American malacologist Henry Augustus Pilsbry in 1908. The type specimens are stored in the Academy of Natural Sciences (number 95251) and in Hirase's collection (number 1538). (Note: Pilsbry did not say whether this was the collection of the older or the younger Hirase. The high serial number and the year suggest that it was that of the older; the younger Hirase was not more than 22 years old in 1908.)

The species was moved into the newly created genus Eostrobilops by Henry Augustus Pilsbry in 1927; Eostrobilops hirasei is the type species of the genus Eostrobilops.

== Distribution ==
The type locality is Jeju Island, in South Korea.

== Shell description ==
The shell is rather depressed, with dome-shaped spire, the periphery mainly rounded but indistinctly subangular in front of the aperture, the base rather strongly convex. The umbilicus is small, widened in the last half-whorl, contained about 5 1/2 times in the diameter of shell (in some examples smaller, 6 times or 7 1/2 times in diameter). Opaque, cinnamon-brown, without much gloss, smoothish, with low growth-wrinkles. Whorls are strongly convex and increase slowly. The aperture is oblique and lunate, peristome russet, expanded and well thickened. The parietal callus is moderately heavy. The parietal lamella is rather strong and emerges to the edge of the callus. The infraparietal lamella is relatively strong though much lower than the parietal, and emerges nearly to the edge of the parietal callus. Both lamellae penetrate inward about one-third of a whorl, being conspicuously nodose at the edges, and there is a very weak continuation to about half a whorl inward. At a point about one-fourth of a whorl inward there is a low, short and blunt columellar lamella and two short basal folds. All or part of these are visible in an oblique view in the aperture, but owing to the opaque texture of the shell they are not visible through the base in specimens examined.

The height of the shell is 2.1 mm. The width of the shell is 3 mm. The shell has 5 1/3 whorls.

The height of the shell of the type specimen is 2.2 mm. The width of the type specimen is 3.2 mm. The type specimen has 5 1/2 whorls.

This relatively large, solid species and it is distinguished from the Eostrobilops coreana and the Eostrobilops nipponica by the number of internal basal plicae (two). The growth wrinkles or striae are rather fine and somewhat sharp below the suture, but are not regular in development in the peripheral and basal parts.
