= Hirase =

Hirase (written: 平瀬) is a Japanese surname. Notable people with the surname include:

- Mayumi Hirase (平瀬 真由美, born 1969), Japanese professional golfer
- Sakugorō Hirase (平瀬 作五郎, 1856-1925), Japanese botanist
- Shintarō Hirase (平瀬 信太郎, 1884-1939), Japanese malacologist
- Tomoyuki Hirase (平瀬 智行, born 1977), Japanese former footballer
- Yoichirō Hirase (平瀬 與一郎, 1859-1925), Japanese malacologist
