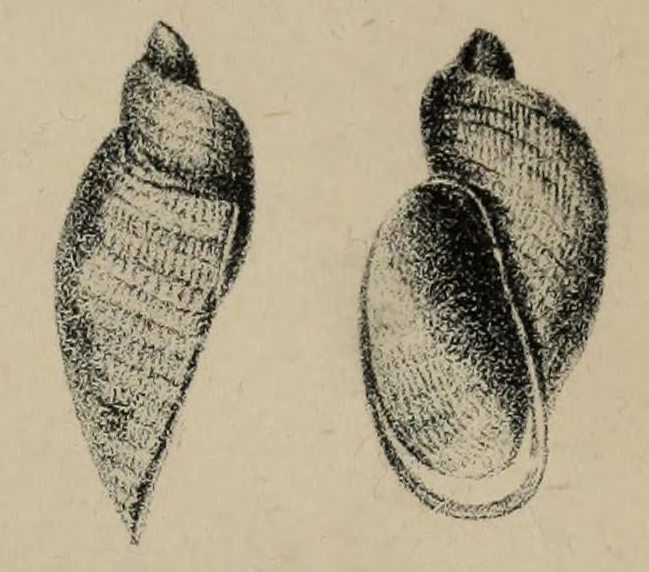

Conservation status
- Least Concern (IUCN 3.1)

Scientific classification
- Kingdom: Animalia
- Phylum: Mollusca
- Class: Gastropoda
- Superorder: Hygrophila
- Family: Planorbidae
- Genus: Culmenella
- Species: C. lineata

Binomial name
- Culmenella lineata (H. F. Blanford, 1871)

Synonyms
- Camptoceras lineatum H. F. Blanford, 1871

= Culmenella lineata =

Species of gastropod

Culmenella lineata is a small species of freshwater gastropod in the family Planorbidae. It is native to South and Southeast Asia. This species lives streams, lakes, and wetlands with aquatic vegetation, where it grazes on microbial growth called periphyton. It is known to survive dry periods by aestivating. It lays eggs in clusters of 6–10, which hatch after 5 days and reach maturity after 20–25 days.

== Taxonomy ==
Culmenella lineata was originally discovered in 1869 by Henry Haversham Godwin-Austen near Nazirpur, India alongside Camptoceras austeni. It was subsequently described in 1871 as Camptoceras lineatum by Henry Francis Blanford. Type specimens, or those used in Blanford's original description, are held in the collections of the Natural History Museum of London.

== Description ==
The dark brown, oval-shaped shell of Culmenella lineata measures about 2.3 mm (0.091 in) in diameter and 4.2–4.5 mm (0.17–0.18 in) in height. The aperture (shell opening) measures about 3.5 by 1.7 mm (0.138 by 0.067 in). The oval-shaped aperture protrudes above the surface of the shell. There are 2.5 whorls, or revolutions of the shell. Most whorls are fused, though in some cases a small fraction of the final (body) whorl is unfused. A 3-dimensional structure (sculpture) is present, made of dark-colored raised lines, as well as small hairs (chaetae).

This snail has red blood, giving it a slightly pink color. The foot (an organ used for locomotion) and tentacles are dotted with black, white, and olive colored spots. The head is dark in color with similarly colored dots and stripes. The foot is relatively short, coming to a blunt point. It is nearly hidden by the extended aperture. The eyes are set at the base of thin tentacles, which widen slightly towards the tips. The animal's snout is also relatively short and blunt.

The radula (a toothy, tongue-like organ) is similar to Camptoceras hirasei and Culmenella subspinosum. This species possesses teeth in rows of 43, with one central rachidian tooth bordered on each side by 9 lateral teeth and 12 poorly developed marginal teeth. The jaws are made of 3 parts, with one wide piece bordered by 2 long skinny pieces.

== Distribution, habitat, and ecology ==
Culmenella lineata may be found across much of South Asia and parts of Southeast Asia, including northern India, Nepal, and Bangladesh. Its range likely extends into Bhutan, Myanmar, and Thailand. It is rare in Nepal. Specific occurrences have been recorded from at least 3 river systems, including the Ganges, Brahmaputra, and Irrawaddy Rivers.

This species may be found up to a depth of 4 m (13 ft) in lakes, ponds, wetlands, and streams with vegetation. This vegetation includes both aquatic species like Hydrilla verticillata (which it is most highly associated with), Vallisneria spiralis, and Potamogeton octandrus, as well as emergent species like Panicum auritum. The species was always observed in substrates with more clay than those with more sand. It shares similar habitats with Camptoceras austeni, and may live alongside it. Like C. austeni, C. lineata may cling to vegetation. It has been observed to eat periphyton (microbial growth) and decomposing plant matter. In an Indian wetland, it was found in population densities of up to 45 per square meter, or as low as 11 per square meter.

This species is known to survive dry periods through a process called aestivation. It can create a structure called an epiphragm, sealing the shell opening (aperture) and preventing the snail from drying out.

== Reproduction and development ==
Culmenella lineata may lay egg capsules on the leaves of aquatic vegetation such as Vallisneria and Hydrilla. Each capsule is circular, measuring about 1 mm (0.039 in) in diameter. Between 6 and 10 eggs may be found in each capsule, which are set in a gel-like substance. The eggs are hexagonal and transparent, displaying a yellow embryo inside. After one day, the embryos will have grown hair-like structures called cilia, allowing them to move around the egg. At 2 days old, the embryos stop moving as much, and the color becomes much fainter and more transparent. At 3 days old, the embryos will have a shell, eyes, and mouth. At 5 days, the embryos hatch into juveniles, and at about 20–25 days, become adults. This species has been observed to lay eggs in captivity, though with low survivability into adulthood.
