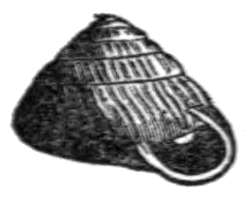
- Drawing of a shell of Strobilops labyrinthicus

Scientific classification
- Kingdom: Animalia
- Phylum: Mollusca
- Class: Gastropoda
- Order: Stylommatophora
- Family: Strobilopsidae
- Genus: Strobilops; Pilsbry, 1893

= Strobilops =

Genus of gastropods

Strobilops is a genus of air-breathing land snails, terrestrial pulmonate gastropod mollusks in the family Strobilopsidae.

== Species ==
The genus Strobilops includes the following species:

- Strobilops aeneus Pilsbry - Bronze pinecone snail photo
- Strobilops hubbardi (A. D. Brown, 1861)
- Strobilops labyrinthicus (Say, 1817)
- Strobilops texasianus
- Strobilops sp. nov. 1
