= Enteroplax =

Scientific classification
- Kingdom: Animalia
- Phylum: Mollusca
- Class: Gastropoda
- Order: Stylommatophora
- Family: Strobilopsidae
- Genus: Enteroplax; Gude, 1899

Genus of gastropods

Enteroplax is a genus of air-breathing land snails, terrestrial pulmonate gastropod mollusks in the family Strobilopsidae.

== Species ==
The genus Enteroplax includes the following species:

- Enteroplax boholensis (Gude) - from Bohol, Philippines
- Enteroplax kanjiokuboi Minato & Tada, 1992 - from Taiwan
- Enteroplax quadrasi (Möllendorff) - type species, from Luzon, Philippines
- Enteroplax taiwanica Minato & Tada, 1992 - from Taiwan
- Enteroplax trochospira (Möllendorff) - from Cebu, Philippines
- Enteroplax yaeyamensis Habe & Chinen, 1974 - from Yaeyama Islands, Japan
