= Strobilops sp. nov. 1 =

Conservation status
- Data Deficient (IUCN 3.1)

Scientific classification
- Kingdom: Animalia
- Phylum: Mollusca
- Class: Gastropoda
- Order: Stylommatophora
- Family: Strobilopsidae
- Genus: Strobilops
- Species: S. sp. nov. 1

Binomial name
- Strobilops sp. nov. 1

Species of gastropod

Strobilops sp. nov. 1 is an (as of 2007 unnamed) undescribed species of air-breathing land snail, a terrestrial pulmonate gastropod mollusk in the family Strobilopsidae.

This species is endemic to Nicaragua.
