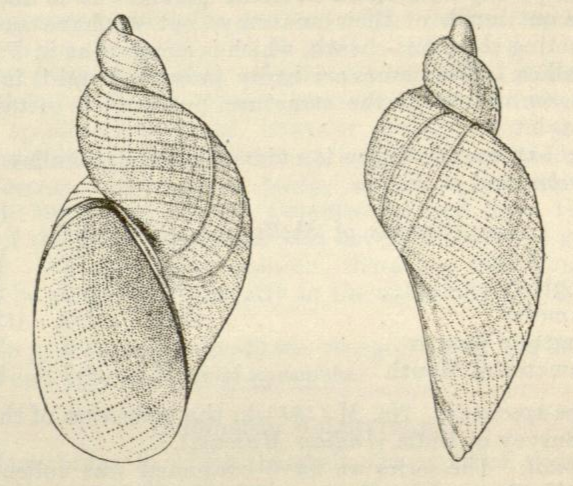
- A drawing of the type specimen.

Scientific classification
- Kingdom: Animalia
- Phylum: Mollusca
- Class: Gastropoda
- Superorder: Hygrophila
- Family: Planorbidae
- Genus: Culmenella
- Species: C. subspinosa

Binomial name
- Culmenella subspinosa (Annandale & Prashad, 1920)

Synonyms
- Camptoceras subspinosum Annandale & Prashad, 1920; unaccepted, original combination

= Culmenella subspinosa =

Species of gastropod

Culmenella subspinosa is a species of freshwater gastropod in the family Planorbidae. It is known from two locations in the Kashmir region.

== Taxonomy ==
Culmenella subspinosa was originally described as Camptoceras subspinosum by Nelson Annandale and Baini Prashad in 1920. In total, 3 specimens were collected in 1916 by F. Hallberg from the Kashmir region in South Asia. It may be closely related to Culmenella lineata, with which the species shares many similarities. Type specimens are not available for study, but are in the collections of the Zoological Survey of India.

== Description ==
The shell of Culmenella subspinosa measures about 5.2–5.5 mm (0.20–0.22 in) in height, and 2.5–2.6 mm (0.098–0.102 in) in diameter. The aperture (shell opening) measures about 3.4–3.6 by 1.7–1.9 mm (0.134–0.142 by 0.067–0.075 in) in length and diameter, respectively. The front side of the aperture is wider than the back. There are 4 whorls (revolutions of the shell), which are rounded. A sculpture (3-dimensional structure) is present, consisting of tubercles arranged in spiralling lines, as well as raised lines that cross these.

It resembles Culmenella lineata, but can be distinguished by its larger size, more elongate shape of the shell, increased number of whorls, and shallower sutures, among other differences.

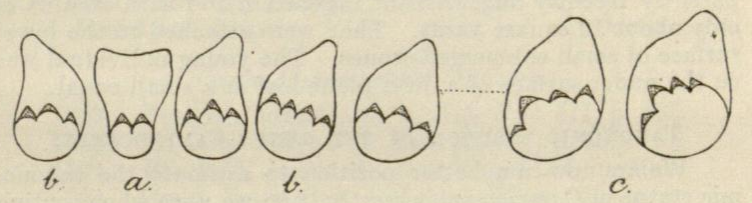
The radular teeth of Culmenella subspinosum. a = central/rachidian tooth, b = lateral teeth, c = marginal teeth

The radula (a toothy, tongue-like organ) and jaw of this species are similar to those of Camptoceras hirasei. However, the teeth are longer in C. subspinosa and the central rachidian teeth possess larger cusps. These rachidian teeth may have two distinct cusps or fused cusps, which form small points. In total, the species has about 37 teeth per row, with 1 central rachidian tooth bordered by 11 lateral and 7 marginal teeth on each side.

== Distribution and habitat ==
Culmenella subspinosa is known from the Kashmir region in South Asia, where it was originally described. 2 specimens were found on the side of a road between Khanabal and Islamabad, and one additional specimen was found in Srinagar. They may live in shallow pools of water or canals, underneath leaves and rocks.
