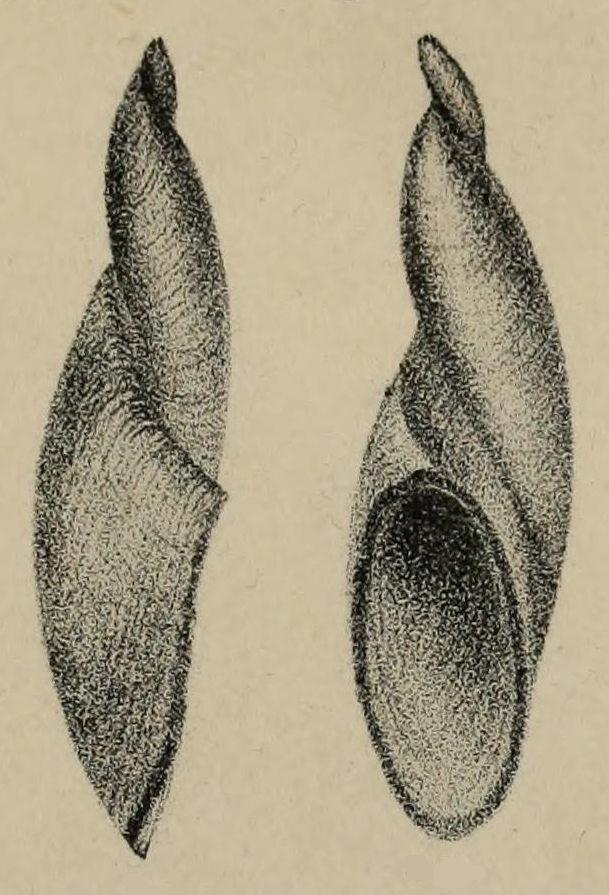

Conservation status
- Data Deficient (IUCN 3.1)

Scientific classification
- Kingdom: Animalia
- Phylum: Mollusca
- Class: Gastropoda
- Superorder: Hygrophila
- Family: Planorbidae
- Genus: Camptoceras
- Species: C. austeni

Binomial name
- Camptoceras austeni H. F. Blanford, 1871

= Camptoceras austeni =

Species of gastropod

Camptoceras austeni is a species of freshwater gastropod in the family Planorbidae. The shell measures about 3.75 mm in height, and possesses deep channels between each whorl (revolution of the shell). It has only ever been found from a single location in Bangladesh, though its range may extend outside of this area.

== Taxonomy ==
Camptoceras austeni was described by Henry Francis Blanford in 1871 from 5 specimens collected in Bangladesh. These specimens were discovered dry and possibly dead by a Colonel Godwin-Austen. It has no taxonomic synonyms. The location of the type specimens (those used in Blanford's original description) are not known, and are likely lost. One preserved specimen is kept in the collections of the Natural History Museum in London.

== Description ==
Camptoceras austeni has a tall, thin shell measuring about 3.75 mm (0.148 in) in height and 1 mm (0.039 in) in diameter. The oval-shaped opening of the shell, called the aperture, measures 1.6 by 0.9 mm (0.063 by 0.035 in) in height and width, respectively. The original specimen described by Blanford had 2.5 whorls, or revolutions of the shell. However, he speculated that it was not fully grown. The whorls are not fused, instead being separated by a deep channel.

This species is much smaller than its close relative Camptoceras terebra. Additionally, it may be distinguished by fewer revolutions of the shell, called whorls, as well as the rounder aperture.

== Distribution, ecology, and conservation ==
Information about this species' distribution, habitat, and ecology is very limited. Camptoceras austeni is only known from the Mymensing District in Bangladesh, though its range may extend to neighboring countries including India, Myanmar, Nepal, and Bhutan. At the time of description, the species was considered rare, and only 5 specimens were discovered. In subsequent years, the species has only ever been found at its type locality, or the area from which it was originally collected. This location may be impacted by pollution and sedimentation from the developed areas surrounding it.

Like others in the superorder Hygrophila, this species may be a detritivore, feeding on periphyton such as algae and bacteria. In dry conditions, this species may form a protective barrier known as an epiphragm, which covers the shell opening and keeps the animal moist. It may be found in freshwater wetlands, rivers, and streams, where it clings to vegetation.
