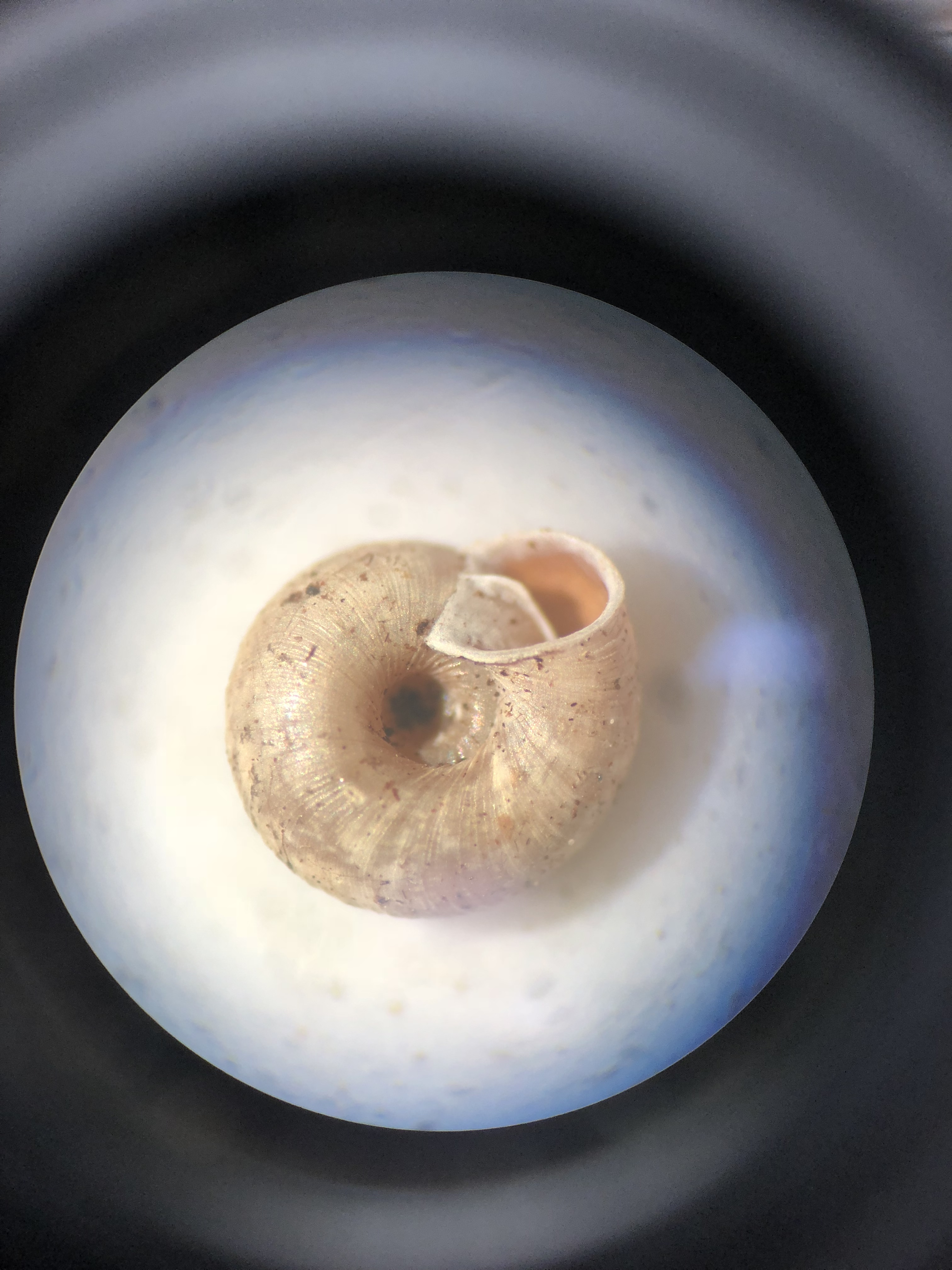
- Discostrobilops hubbardi - under view

Conservation status
- Vulnerable (NatureServe)

Scientific classification
- Kingdom: Animalia
- Phylum: Mollusca
- Class: Gastropoda
- Order: Stylommatophora
- Family: Strobilopsidae
- Genus: Discostrobilops
- Species: D. hubbardi

Binomial name
- Discostrobilops hubbardi (A. D. Brown, 1861)

Synonyms
- Helix hubbardi A. D. Brown, 1861; Helix vendryesiana Gloyne, 1871; Strobila hubbardi (A. D. Brown, 1861); Strobilops (Discostrobilops) hubbardi (A. D. Brown, 1861); Strobilops (Discostrobilops) pilsbryi J. P. E. Morrison, 1953; Strobilops hubbardi (A. D. Brown, 1861); Strobilops hubbardi stevensoni Pilsbry, 1899; Strobilops hubbardi var. stevensoni Pilsbry, 1899; Strobilops hubbardi vendryesiana (Gloyne, 1871); Strobilops pilsbryi J. P. E. Morrison, 1953

= Discostrobilops hubbardi =

Species of gastropod

Discostrobilops hubbardi is a land snail of the Americas - colloquially known as the flattened pinecone. It was formerly known as Strobilops hubbardi, but that taxon is no longer in use. It is known to be found in Southern parts of the United States, including Georgia, Alabama, and Florida. It was confirmed in 2018 to be living in South Texas.
