= Eostrobilops yaeyamensis =

Scientific classification
- Kingdom: Animalia
- Phylum: Mollusca
- Class: Gastropoda
- Order: Stylommatophora
- Family: Strobilopsidae
- Genus: Eostrobilops
- Species: E. yaeyamensis

Binomial name
- Eostrobilops yaeyamensis Habe & Chinen, 1974

Species of gastropod

Eostrobilops yaeyamensis is a species of air-breathing land snail, terrestrial pulmonate gastropod mollusks in the family Strobilopsidae.

== Distribution ==
This species occurs in:

- Yaeyama Islands, Japan

The type locality is Sonai, Irimote Island, Yaeyama Islands.

This is a vulnerable species.

== Description ==
The width of the shell is 2.2 mm; the height of the shell is 1.7 mm.
