= Culmenella prashadi =

Scientific classification
- Kingdom: Animalia
- Phylum: Mollusca
- Class: Gastropoda
- Superorder: Hygrophila
- Family: Planorbidae
- Genus: Culmenella
- Species: C. prashadi

Binomial name
- Culmenella prashadi (Clench, 1931)

Synonyms
- Bulinus (Culmenella) hirasei Clench, 1927; Bulinus hirasei Clench, 1927; junior homonym of Camptoceras hirasei; Camptoceras (Culmenella) prashadi; alternative representation

Species of Gastropod

Culmenella prashadi is a small species of freshwater gastropod in the family Planorbidae. It is the type species of the genus Culmenella. It can be found throughout Japan, though is extinct and is considered Critically Endangered in some areas.

== Taxonomy ==
Culmenella prashadi was originally described by William J. Clench in 1927 as Bulinus (Culmenella) hirasei, named after Yoichirō Hirase. It was described from specimens collected by Hirase from the former province of Kawachi, Japan. In 1931, Clench moved it to the genus Camptoceras (Culmenella), but conflicts with the existing Camptoceras hirasei forced a name change to Camptoceras (Culmenella) prashadi. During this 1931 name change, C. prashadi was named the type species of the new subgenus Camptoceras (Culmenella).

Culmenella rezvoji may be synonymous with this species.

== Description ==
=== Shell characteristics ===
The shell of Culmenella prashadi is a muted orange or brown in color, and spirals to the left (sinistral). It measures between 3.9–5.3 mm (0.15–0.21 in) in height, with an average of 4.41 mm. In diameter, the shell measures between 2.6–3.2 mm (0.10–0.13 in), with an average of 2.78. The ratio of shell diameter to shell height is between 0.58 and 0.67. The whorls, or revolutions of the shell, number between 1.75–2 (2.5–3 according to Clench), and greatly expand in size with each successive whorl. The spire (the pointy end of the shell) is short. The sutures (fusions between whorls) are deeply set. The oval-shaped aperture (shell opening) is between 1–1.4 mm in length. The ratio of aperture width to length is 0.47–0.54. The aperture sits at an angle of about 70 degrees from back to front. The shell has some sculpture (3-dimensional structure) made of spiralling ridged lines with smaller, crossed lines in between. Additionally, there are short hairs along the shell's surface.

The protoconch (larval shell) of this species has about 0.75 whorls, and is set at nearly 180 degrees to the adult shell. It possesses a sculpture of spiral ridges, though only weakly.

=== Mouth and digestive system ===
The radula (a toothy, tongue-like organ) has rows of 30–41 teeth. A central rachidian tooth is bordered on each side by lateral and marginal teeth, which are indistinguishable from one another. The rachidian tooth is rectangular, and possesses 4 cusps; two much larger and more pointed than the others. This differs from Culmenella rezvoji, which has rachidian teeth with only 3 cusps. The lateral and marginal teeth possess one large, pointed cone (mesocone), and 4–6 other cones (endocones). From the seventh lateral tooth outwards, the number of cusps increases. The jaw is composed of 3 parts; a large central plate bordered on each side by a thin plate. The esophagus leads to a small crop and gizzard, which are connected to large muscles. This then flows into the stomach and then to the intestines, which exit through the anal pore. The anal pore is located behind a mantle flap on the animal's left side.

=== Other characteristics ===
Culmenella prashadi possesses an elongated bursa copulatrix (a structure that stores sperm) at a length of about 0.25 mm. The prostate gland is about 0.5 mm in length, the penis sheath is about 0.8 mm, the preputium is about 0.7 mm, and an accessory preputial organ is present, measuring about 0.3 mm. The length of this accessory preputial organ is shorter than that of Culmenella rezvoji. Additionally, C. rezvoji possesses more diverticules (pocket-like structures) in the prostate gland. These diverticules are thinner than those of C. prashadi.

The snail's head and foot (a muscular organ used for locomotion) are a light pink in color, and possess light brown spots on the snout, tentacles, and the sides of the foot. The tentacles are long, but do not protrude further than the snout. The black eyes are set at the base of the tentacles, facing inwards. The snout is wide and round. The foot is round in the front and pointed in the back. The mantle (a skin-like organ) possesses tiny black pigment spots, and is separated from the head and foot by a distinctive collar. A space within the mantle (the mantle cavity) is about 2.5 mm deep. The mantle flap, which covers the mantle cavity, is rectangular, and is located on the right side of the animal. Inside the shell, the body only occupies the final body whorl, with the apical whorls being empty.

Within the central nervous system of Culmenella prashadi, the visceral and pleural ganglia were unfused, which is unlike the fused ganglia of Camptoceras hirasei.

== Distribution and conservation ==
Culmenella prashadi is known from several areas throughout Japan, and may be endemic. If Culmenella rezvoji is considered to be synonymous with C. prashadi, then this may expand its range to Southeastern Russia. Specific occurrences have been recorded in 15 prefectures in Japan, though it is considered extinct in 6 of these, including its type locality (where it was originally described) in Kawachi (modern Osaka Prefecture). In Shizuoka, Ishikawa, Nagano, and Iwate Prefectures, this species is considered Critically Endangered. Recent sightings of the species have been restricted to Fukushima, Aomori, Iwate, and Nagano Prefectures, and few populations remain.

== Habitat and ecology ==
Culmenella prashadi has been found to live in ponds with sandy and muddy substrate, up to a depth of 0.5 m (1.6 ft). The species mostly hides amongst leaf litter. It may occur alongside other mollusk species, including Ferrissia californica, Cipangopaludina laeta, and Odhneripisidium uejii.
