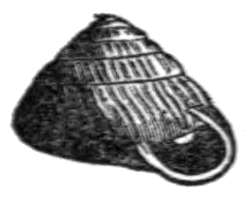
- The shell of Strobilops labyrinthicus

Conservation status
- Secure (NatureServe)

Scientific classification
- Kingdom: Animalia
- Phylum: Mollusca
- Class: Gastropoda
- Order: Stylommatophora
- Family: Strobilopsidae
- Genus: Strobilops
- Species: S. labyrinthicus

Binomial name
- Strobilops labyrinthicus (Say, 1817)

Synonyms
- Helix labyrinthica Say, 1817; Laoma elegans Suter, 1896; Strobila labyrinthica (Say, 1817); Strobila labyrinthica var. virgo Pilsbry, 1892; Strobilops labyrinthica (Say, 1817); Strobilops virgo Pilsbry, 1893

= Strobilops labyrinthicus =

Species of gastropod

Strobilops labyrinthicus, common name the maze pinecone, is a species of air-breathing land snail, a terrestrial pulmonate gastropod mollusk in the family Strobilopsidae.

Its shell color is reddish brown and it has a height of 1.7-1.8 mm with a diameter of 2.3 mm. Its aperture is semicircular in shape, peristome reflected, brown.

This species of land snail occurs in North America, ranging from Texas in the south to Ontario and Manitoba in the north. It also occurs in Oklahoma
