= Culmenella rezvoji =

Conservation status
- Data Deficient (IUCN 3.1)

Scientific classification
- Kingdom: Animalia
- Phylum: Mollusca
- Class: Gastropoda
- Superorder: Hygrophila
- Family: Planorbidae
- Genus: Culmenella
- Species: C. rezvoji

Binomial name
- Culmenella rezvoji (Lindholm, 1929)

Synonyms
- Camptoceras rezvoji Lindholm, 1929; Glyptophysa rezvoji Lindholm, 1929; superseded combination

Species of gastropod

Culmenella rezvoji is a species of air-breathing freshwater snail with a sinistral shell; an aquatic pulmonate gastropod mollusk in the family Planorbidae. This species is found in Japan, Russia, and China. In Japan, it is considered either Endangered or Critically Endangered, and populations are declining. It may be found in shallow water, and is associated with aquatic vegetationa and muddy substrate.

== Taxonomy ==
In 1929, Wassili Adolfovitch Lindholm described the species as Glyptophysa rezvoji from the Daubikhe River, near the village of Yakovlevka in Russia. Several specimens were used in Lindholm's description. The lectotype (primary specimen) and 3 paralectotypes are kept in the Zoological Institute of the Russian Academy of Sciences. One of these paralectotypes was used in the description of Culmenella lindholmi.

Similarities in the shell of this species to those of Culmenella buldowski and Culmenella lindholmi have called into question if these species are actually synonymous. Additionally, some sources argue that Culmenella rezvoji may itself be a synonym of Culmenella prashadi, given that the two are so similar.

== Description ==
The morphology and formation of the sperm of Culmenella rezvoji has been described as typical for the superorder Hygrophila. The total size of the sperm ranges from 372 to 439 microns. The midpiece has 3 evenly spaced glycogen helices, distinguishing it from most other Hygrophila species, which either have 4 helices or 3 unevenly spaced helices. The midpiece also has a relatively tall corkscrew ridge, which help propel the sperm.

This species is extremely similar to Culmenella prashadi, but can be differentiated by the number of cusps on the lateral teeth: 3 in C. rezvoji and 4 in C. prashadi. They are similar enough that they may actually be synonymous. Another difference between the two species is the increased number and relative narrowness of the diverticula (pouch-like structures) of the ovotestis in C. rezvoji.

== Distribution, habitat, and conservation ==
The distribution of Culmenella rezvoji is primarily placed within southeastern Russia and across Japan. Its range also extends into parts of northeastern China, and may also extend into the Korean peninsula. In Russia, it is known from the Amur River basin in Primorsky Krai. In Japan, it is considered either Endangered or Critically Endangered, especially in Tokyo and the Kanagawa Prefecture. It faces threats from habitat degradation as well as wastewater and agricultural effluents. Populations are thought to be decreasing.

This species may be found in shallow water bodies including lakes, fens, marshes, and rice fields. It is associated with aquatic vegetation including the genus Elodea. It may burrow in muddy substrate.
