= Klemmia =

Scientific classification
- Kingdom: Animalia
- Phylum: Mollusca
- Class: Gastropoda
- Order: Stylommatophora
- Family: Spelaeodiscidae
- Genus: Klemmia; Gittenberger, 1969

Genus of land snails

Klemmia is a genus of subterranean-dwelling snails belonging to the family Spelaeodiscidae. It is endemic to Bar Municipality in Montenegro.

== Species ==
The genus Klemmia consists of 2 species both of which are Near Threatened.

- Klemmia magnicosta Gittenberger, 1975
- Klemmia sinistrorsa Gittenberger, 1969
