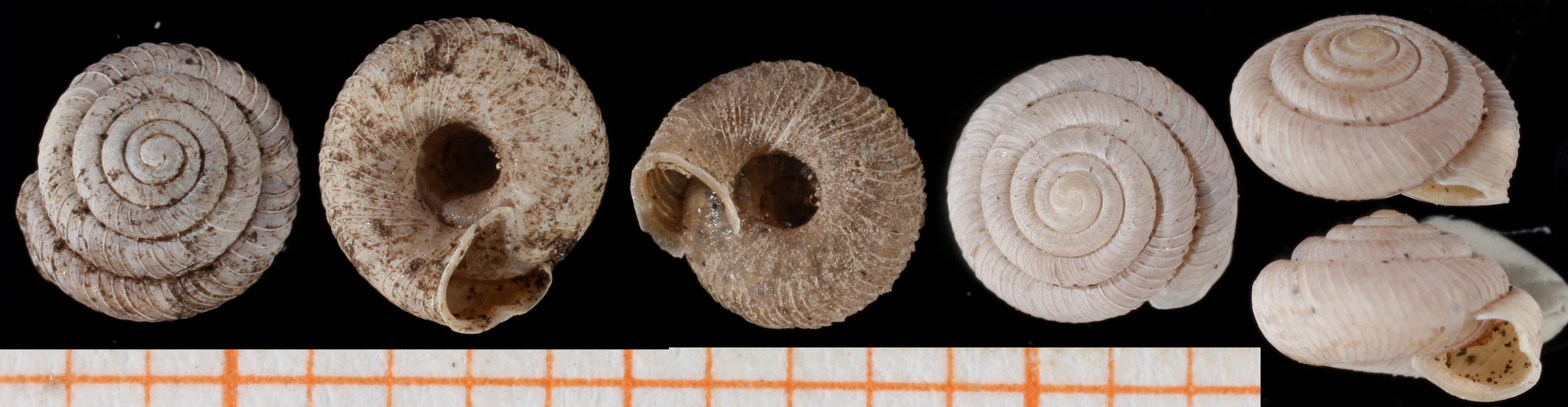

Conservation status
- Least Concern (IUCN 3.1)

Scientific classification
- Kingdom: Animalia
- Phylum: Mollusca
- Class: Gastropoda
- Order: Stylommatophora
- Family: Spelaeodiscidae
- Genus: Spelaeodiscus
- Species: S. triarius

Binomial name
- Spelaeodiscus triarius (Rossmässler, 1839)

= Spelaeodiscus triarius =

Species of gastropod

Spelaeodiscus triarius is a species of very small air-breathing land snail, a terrestrial pulmonate gastropod mollusk in the family Spelaeodiscidae.

== Subspecies ==
- Spelaeodiscus triarius tatricus (Hazay, 1883) - synonym: Spelaeodiscus tatricus Hazay, 1883 - The native distribution of this subspecies is western-carpathian. It is endemic to Slovakia and it is listed as Vulnerable in the 2010 IUCN Red List.
