= Eostrobilops =

Scientific classification
- Kingdom: Animalia
- Phylum: Mollusca
- Class: Gastropoda
- Order: Stylommatophora
- Family: Strobilopsidae
- Genus: Eostrobilops; Pilsbry, 1927

Genus of gastropods

Eostrobilops is a genus of air-breathing land snails, terrestrial pulmonate gastropod mollusks in the family Strobilopsidae.

== Distribution ==
This species of land snail occurs in Japan, Korea and China.

== Species ==
The genus Eostrobilops includes the following species:

- Eostrobilops coreana Pilsbry, 1927
- Eostrobilops diodontina (Heude)
- Eostrobilops hirasei (Pilsbry, 1908) - type species
- Eostrobilops nipponica Pilsbry, 1927
- Eostrobilops yaeyamensis (Habe & Chinen, 1974)
