= Eostrobilops nipponica =

Scientific classification
- Kingdom: Animalia
- Phylum: Mollusca
- Class: Gastropoda
- Order: Stylommatophora
- Family: Strobilopsidae
- Genus: Eostrobilops
- Species: E. nipponica

Binomial name
- Eostrobilops nipponica (Pilsbry, 1927)

Synonyms
- Strobilops nipponica Pilsbry, 1927

Species of gastropod

Eostrobilops nipponica is a species of air-breathing land snail, terrestrial pulmonate gastropod mollusks in the family Strobilopsidae.

== Subspecies ==
- Eostrobilops nipponica nipponica Pilsbry, 1927 - It is a vulnerable subspecies.
- Eostrobilops nipponica reikoae Matsumura & Minato, 1998 - This is a near threatened subspecies.

== Distribution ==
This species occurs in Japan.
