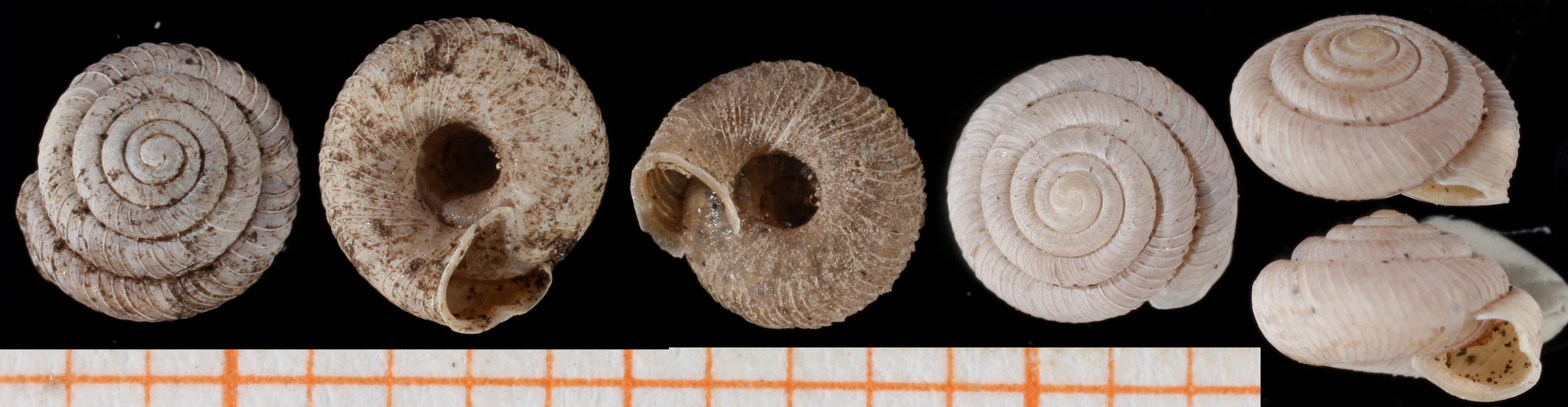
- Spelaeodiscus triarius

Scientific classification
- Kingdom: Animalia
- Phylum: Mollusca
- Class: Gastropoda
- Order: Stylommatophora
- Family: Spelaeodiscidae
- Genus: Spelaeodiscus; Brusina, 1886

Diversity
- 7 species

= Spelaeodiscus =

Genus of Gastropoda

Spelaeodiscus is a genus of very small air-breathing land snails, terrestrial pulmonate gastropod mollusks in the family Spelaeodiscidae.

This is the type genus of the family Spelaeodiscidae.

== Species ==
The genus Spelaeodiscus contains the following species:

- Spelaeodiscus albanicus (Wagner, 1914) (Albania)
- Spelaeodiscus bulgaricus (Subai & Dedov, 2008) (Bulgaria)
- Spelaeodiscus dejongi Gittenberger, 1969 (Montenegro)
- Spelaeodiscus hauffeni (Schmidt, 1855) (Slovenia) - type species
- Spelaeodiscus obodensis Bole, 1965 (Montenegro)
- Spelaeodiscus triarius (Rossmässler, 1839) - synonym: Spelaeodiscus tatricus Hazay, 1883 (Hungary and Romania)
- Spelaeodiscus unidentatus Bole, 1961 (Albania and Montenegro)
