= Virpazaria =

Scientific classification
- Kingdom: Animalia
- Phylum: Mollusca
- Class: Gastropoda
- Order: Stylommatophora
- Family: Spelaeodiscidae
- Genus: Virpazaria; Gittenberger, 1969

Genus of land snails

Virpazaria is a genus of gastropods belonging to the family Spelaeodiscidae. It is found in Western Balkans.

== Distribution ==
The species of this genus are mostly found in Montenegro, but also present in Albania and Croatia.

== Species ==
Genus Virpazaria currently consists of 10 species:

Virpazaria adrianae Gittenberger, 1969 (Montenegro)

Virpazaria aspectulabeatidis Reischütz et al., 2009 (Montenegro)

Virpazaria backhuysi Gittenberger, 1969 (Montenegro)

Virpazaria deelemanorum Gittenberger, 1969 (Albania and Montenegro)

Virpazaria gittenbergeri Fehér & Erőss, 2019 (Albania and Montenegro)

Virpazaria nicoleae Reischütz, 2012 (Montenegro)

Virpazaria pageti Gittenberger, 1969 (Croatia and Montenegro)

Virpazaria pesici Fehér & Deli, 2019 (Montenegro)

Virpazaria ripkeni Gittenberger, 1969 (Albania and Montenegro)

Virpazaria stojaspali Reischütz et al., 2009 (Montenegro, but most likely also present in Albania)
