= Culmenella jiraponi =

Conservation status
- Least Concern (IUCN 3.1)

Scientific classification
- Kingdom: Animalia
- Phylum: Mollusca
- Class: Gastropoda
- Superorder: Hygrophila
- Family: Planorbidae
- Genus: Culmenella
- Species: C. jiraponi

Binomial name
- Culmenella jiraponi (Hubendick, 1967)

Synonyms
- Camptoceras (Culmenella) jiraponi Hubendick, 1967; Camptoceras jiraponi Hubendick, 1967; original (unaccepted) combination

Species of gastropod

Culmenella jiraponi is a small freshwater species of gastropod in the family Planorbidae. It is endemic to Thailand, where it lives in highly vegetated slow-moving waters.

== Taxonomy ==
Culmenella jiraponi was described by Bengt Hubendick in 1967 from specimens collected in Thonburi, Thailand.

== Description ==
Like other species of Culmenella, Culmenella jiraponi has an oval-shaped shell similar to those of Bulinus and Physella. The shell measures between 5 and 5.6 mm (0.20 and 0.22 in) in height and 2.7 to 3.1 mm (0.11 to 0.12 in) in diameter. There are 2.5 whorls, or revolutions of the shell, which spiral to the left (a condition known as sinistry). These whorls expand rapidly, making the final (body) whorl much larger than the others. The other whorls create a very short spire. The aperture (shell opening) is oval-shaped, with the posterior part being slightly narrower. The shell also has some 3-dimensional structure (also called sculpture) in the form of 15 small spiralling lines, as well as hairs (chaetae).

This species is grey in overall coloration, though possesses black markings along the edge of the foot. It has flaps at the end of its tentacles, which are thought to be sensory in function. A flap of skin covers the opening to the mantle cavity. The radula, a toothy tongue-like appendage, possesses rows of teeth, each numbering 33 total. A central rachidian tooth displays 2 large and 2 small cusps. The rachidian tooth is bordered on each side by 13 lateral teeth and 3 marginal. Each lateral tooth has between 4–5 cusps, and each marginal tooth has 6 cusps.

This species, like some other planorbids, possesses a structure called the accessory preputial organ. This distinguishes it from Physella and Bulinus, which do not possess the structure. It may be further distinguished from Physella due to its larger body whorl, deeper sutures, shorter spire, and the presence of the shell hair. It may be distinguished from Culmenella prashadi by differences in the mantle, namely that the mantle flap in C. jiraponi is made of 2 separate tissues, whereas in C. prashadi it is made of 1.

== Distribution and habitat ==
Culmenella jiraponi is only known from Thailand, though it is likely widespread within the country. It may be found at its type locality (where it was originally described) in Thonburi, as well as the provinces of Nakhon Si Thammarat, Chiang Mai, Nakhon Ratchasima, and Phang Nga. Its range may extend to greater Bangkok as well as Vietnam. There are also records of the species occurring in southern Laos, but this appears to be a misidentification. Since at least 2001, the invasive Physella acuta has been commonly misidentified as Culmenella jiraponi, implying that their distribution should be revised.

This species may be found in low abundances in freshwater, though may occur in brackish water as well. Habitats usually consist of stagnant water with aquatic plants, such as lotus ponds. It may be found in shallow water on vegetation or burrowed into the substrate.
