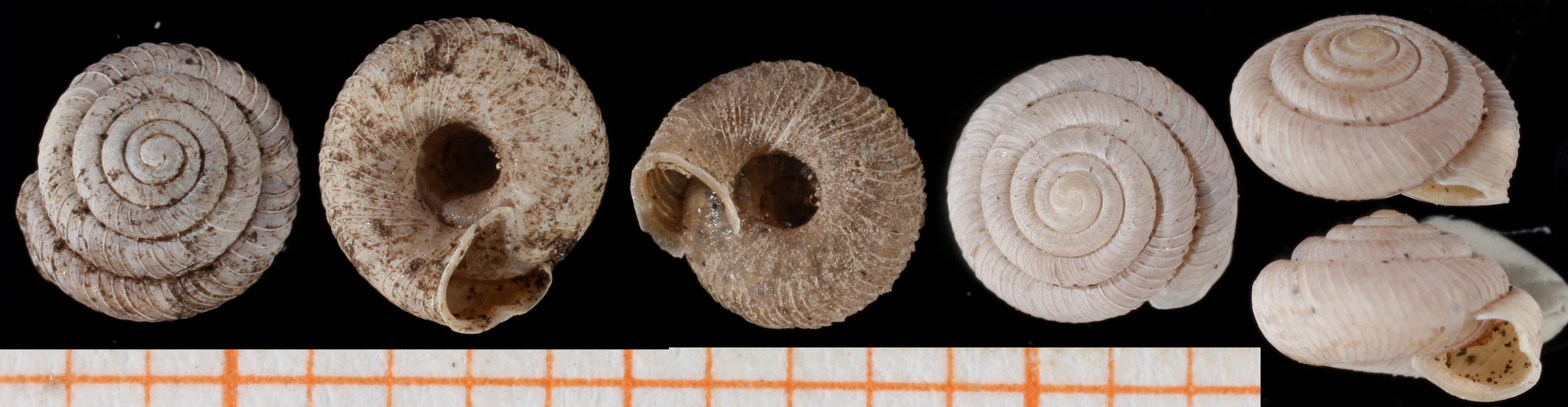
- Spelaeodiscus triarius

Scientific classification
- Kingdom: Animalia
- Phylum: Mollusca
- Class: Gastropoda
- Order: Stylommatophora
- Superfamily: Pupilloidea
- Family: Spelaeodiscidae; Steenberg, 1925

Genera
- See text
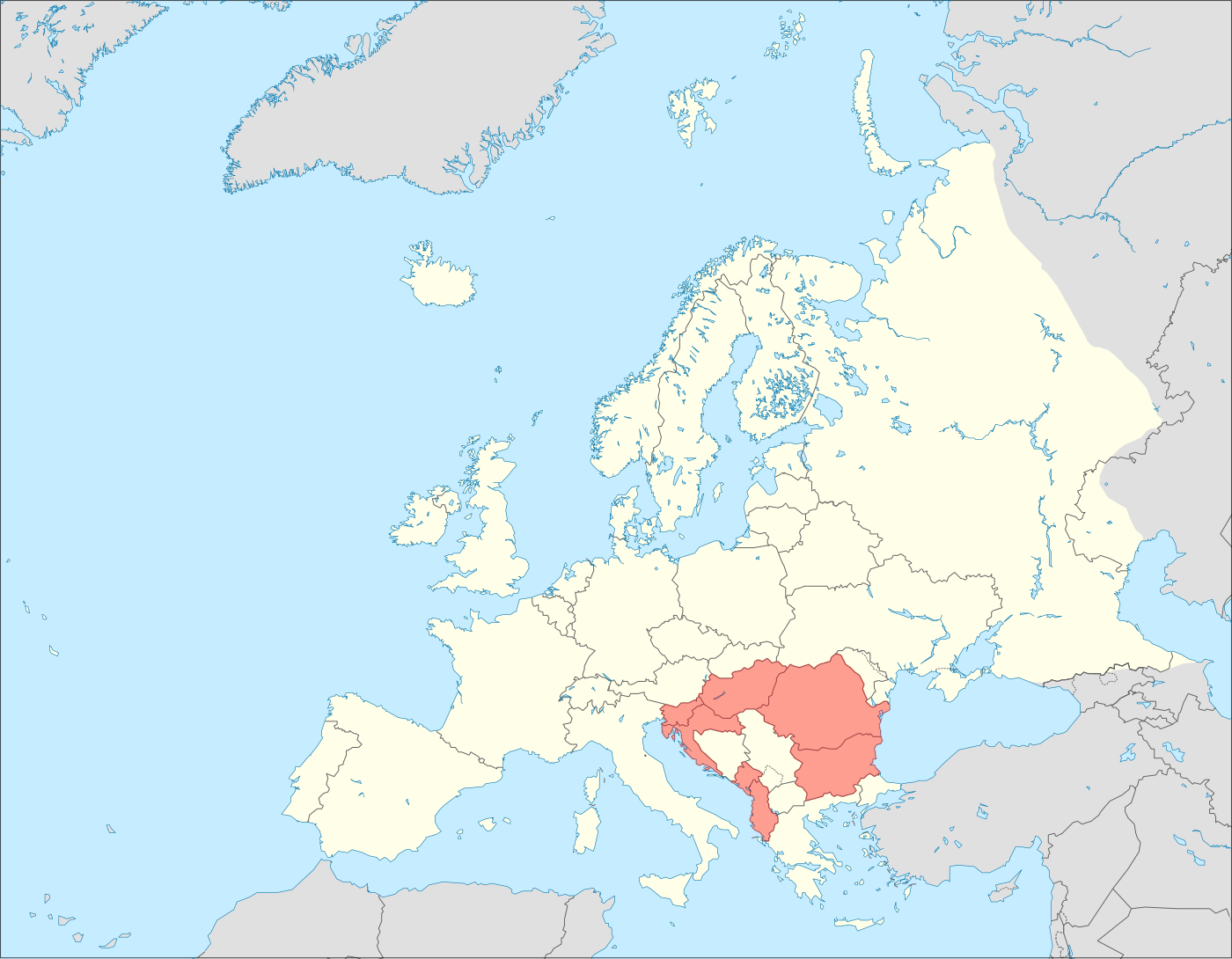

Synonyms
- Aspasitinae Steenberg, 1925

= Spelaeodiscidae =

Family of gastropods

Spelaeodiscidae is a family of very small air-breathing land snails found in Southeastern and East Central Europe.

The family Spelaeodiscidae has no subfamilies (according to the taxonomy of the Gastropoda by Bouchet & Rocroi, 2005).

== Genera ==
Genera within the family Spelaeodiscidae include:

- Klemmia Gittenberger, 1969 (Montenegro)
- Spelaeodiscus Brusina, 1886 (Europe) - type genus
- Virpazaria Gittenberger, 1969 (Western Balkans)
