= Shintarō Hirase =

Japanese malacologist

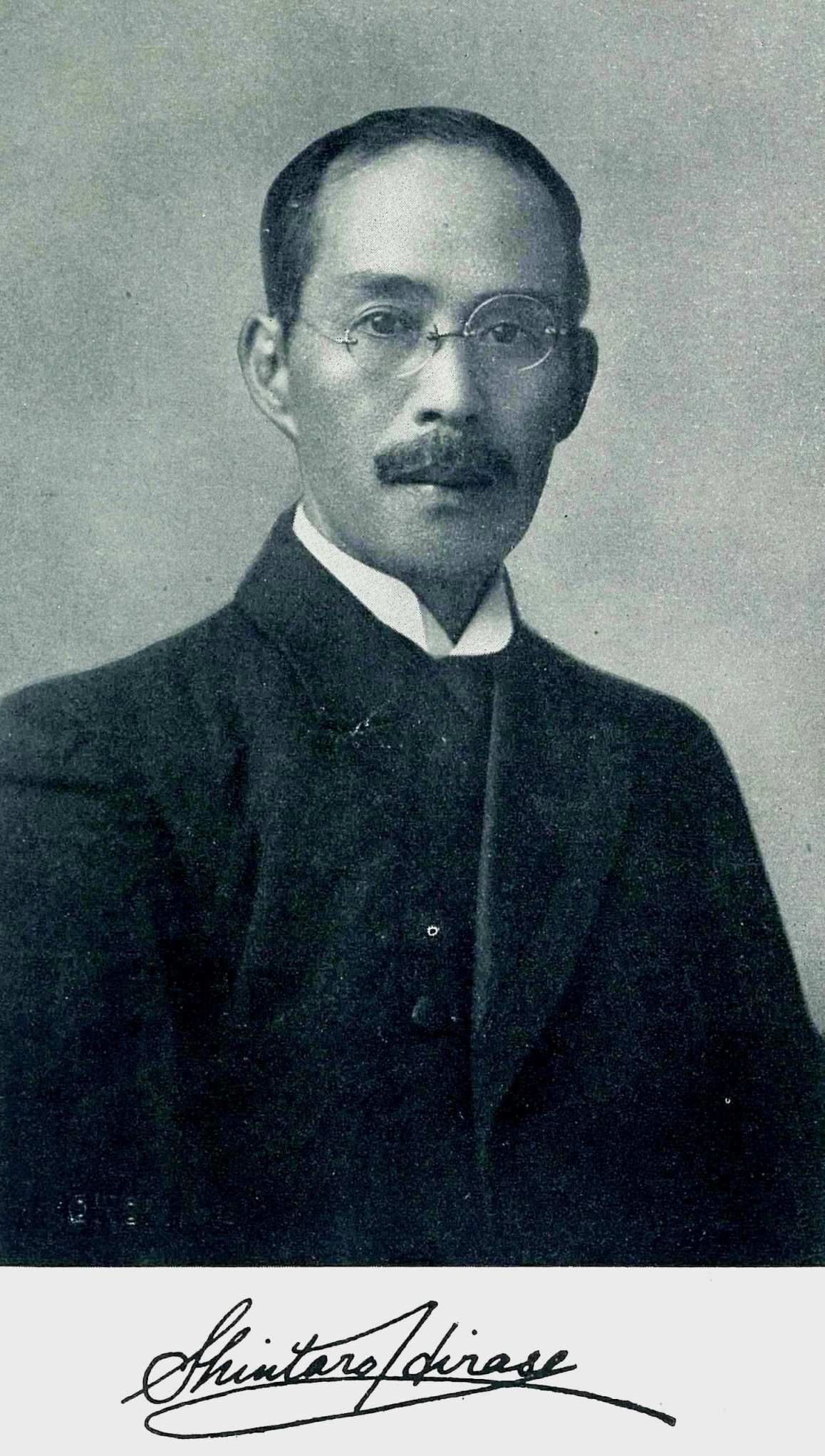
- Shintarō Hirase
- Born: February 28, 1884; Awaji Island, Japan
- Died: September 9, 1939 (aged 55); Tokyo, Japan
- Scientific career
- Fields: malacology

Shintarō Hirase (平瀬 信太郎, Hirase Shintarō; February 28, 1884 – September 9, 1939) was a Japanese malacologist. His father, Yoichirō Hirase, (1859–1925) was also a malacologist. With his father, he collected shells and helped formalize malacology in Japan. Due to their contributions to malacology, numerous species bear the Hirase name, such as Conus hirasei, .

Hirase was born at Hukura on Awaji Island on February 28, 1884, and was the eldest son of Yoichirō Hirase. Growing up surrounded by his father's business and collection, he developed a lifelong love of malacology. He graduated from Third College and afterward took courses on psychology at the Faculty of Literature at Kyoto Imperial University (1910). In 1914 he matriculated to the faculty of Science, Tōkyō Imperial University, having passed an examination for the science courses at the First College. He received his master's degree from Tōkyō Imperial University in 1917 and continued post graduate work from 1917 to 1922. He was elected a member of the Malacological Society of London, of America, and of Germany. He was a founding member of the Malacological Society of Japan, alongside Tokubei Kuroda. He went on to teach natural sciences and zoology at Hōsei University, Meiji University, Seikei University, and Senshū University from 1920 until shortly before his death. In his obituary from the Proceedings of the Malacological Society of London, he was noted to be “without political interests and enthusiastically devoted to the study of mollusks.” His publications of note included a review of Japanese oysters, scaphopods, and a catalogue of Japanese shells with hand illustrated plates. Shintaro died on September 9, 1939, at age 55 at his home in Tōkyō after a short period of kidney failure.

At its largest, the Hirase collection grew to 15,000 pieces. Prior to WWII, the collection was split to ensure its survival. One third was donated to various museums, including the Smithsonian, one third was kept at the house of Shintaro in Tokyo, and the last third was stored in the Research Institute for Natural Resources in Tokyo. The majority of the collection was destroyed during incendiary bombing of Tokyo during the war. Only 5000 pieces, mostly consisting of the minute marine specimens, the land specimens, and fresh water specimens, survived the war. The surviving pieces of the collection have been stored in the Research Institute for Natural Resources in Tokyo since 1948.

== Collection ==
Of the collection of Shintarō Hirase and his father Yoichirō Hirase, only around 5000 specimens have survived, approximately 30% of the original collection. Most of the collection was destroyed by incendiary bombs during the bombing of Tokyo, destroying specimens kept in the house of Shintarō Hirase, as well as in the Research Institute for Natural Resources in Tokyo The surviving pieces have been stored in the Research Institute for Natural Resources in Tokyo since 1948.

== Bibliography ==
His works include:

- Hirase S. [review about Japanese oysters] Jap. J. Zool. 3 and 4
- Hirase S. [review about scaphopods] Journal of Conchology 1
- Hirase S. (1934). A collection of Japanese shells with illustrations in natural colours.

== Taxa described ==
- Aglaja iwasai Hirase, 1936 was synonymized with Philinopsis cyanea (Martens, 1879) by William B. Rudman in 1972.
- Babylonia pallida Hirase, 1934 is a synonym of Babylonia kirana Habe, 1965
- Berthella gotoi Hirase, 1936
- Oscanius testudinarius Hirase 1927
- Ostrea circumpicta Hirase, 1930 is a synonym of Crassostrea nippona (Seki, 1934)
- Xenophora tenuis Hirase, 1934 is a synonym of Xenophora tenuis Fulton, 1983
