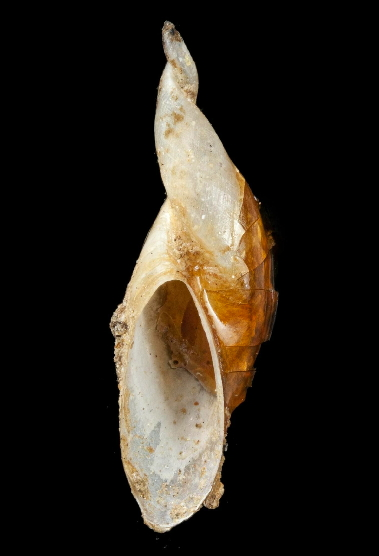
- Shell of Camptoceras terebra (syntype at the Natural History Museum, London)

Conservation status
- Data Deficient (IUCN 3.1)

Scientific classification
- Kingdom: Animalia
- Phylum: Mollusca
- Class: Gastropoda
- Superorder: Hygrophila
- Family: Planorbidae
- Genus: Camptoceras
- Species: C. terebra

Binomial name
- Camptoceras terebra W. H. Benson, 1843

= Camptoceras terebra =

Species of gastropod

Camptoceras terebra is a species of small freshwater snail, an aquatic gastropod mollusc in the family Planorbidae, commonly known as the ram’s horn snails. It is characterized by its coiled, sinistral (left-handed) shell and its association with slow-moving or stagnant freshwater habitats.

== Taxonomy ==
Camptoceras terebra was described by William Henry Benson in 1843. It is the type species for the genus Camptoceras. This species has no taxonomic synonyms. One source classifies the Japanese species Camptoceras hirasei as a subspecies of C. terebra (Camptoceras terebra hirasei). One syntype (specimen used in Benson's original description) is in the collections of the Natural History Museum of London.

== Description ==
The shell of Camptoceras terebra is long and skinny, with a height of about 6 to 7 mm (0.24 to 0.28 in) and a diameter of about 3 mm (0.12 in). At maximum, the shell may reach about 9 mm (0.35 in) in height. The shell opening, called the aperture, is about 4 mm (0.16 in) in the largest dimension. The revolutions of the shell, called whorls, curl to the left in a condition known as sinistry. The whorls are few in number and are not fused. A sculpture (3-dimensional protrusions of the shell) may be present in the form of varices. These varices are projections of the edge of the aperture at different points in the animal's life, and look similar to those found in the unrelated genus Epitonium. The sculpture does not include spiral striae.

This species possesses proportionally large eyes relative to its body, which are located between the tentacles. The foot, a muscular organ used for moving, is relatively short.

== Distribution and habitat ==
Camptoceras terebra may be found in India, though its exact distribution is unclear. Specific occurrences have been recorded from Uttar Pradesh and West Bengal. It is considered rare along all parts of its range, though this may be due to underreporting. In West Bengal, it was found in densities of about 4 individuals per square meter. The areas it inhabits are strongly impacted by pollution, agricultural effluents, among other habitat changes.

== Ecology ==
Little is known of the biology and ecology of Camptoceras terebra. It may be found in deep rivers hiding amongst blades of aquatic vegetation. It is slow-moving and sticks well to surfaces. Like others in the superorder Hygrophila, it may be a detritivore, feeding on periphyton such as algae and bacteria. It may be found alongside other gastropods, including Polypylis calathus, Melanoides tuberculata, as well as species of Lymnaea, Planorbis, Pila, and Bithynia.
