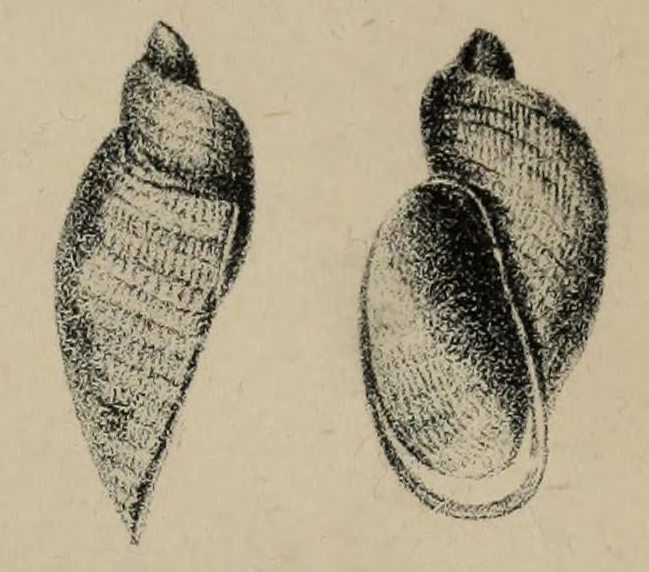
- Culmenella lineata

Scientific classification
- Kingdom: Animalia
- Phylum: Mollusca
- Class: Gastropoda
- Superorder: Hygrophila
- Family: Planorbidae
- Genus: Culmenella; Clench, 1927

Synonyms
- Bulinus (Culmenella) Clench, 1927; Camptoceras (Culmenella) Clench, 1927; Culmenella (Culmenellina) Starobogatov & Prozorova, 1990; junior synonym

= Culmenella =

Genus of gastropods

Culmenella is a genus of freshwater gastropods in the family Planorbidae.

== Taxonomy ==
Culmenella was originally described as a subgenus of Bulinus by Clench in 1927. Culmenella prashadi is the type species.

== Species ==
The species in this genus are as follows:

=== Species ===
- Culmenella jiraponi (Hubendick, 1967)
- Culmenella lineata (H. F. Blanford, 1871)
- Culmenella prashadi (Clench, 1931)
- Culmenella rezvoji (Lindholm, 1929)
- Culmenella subspinosa (Annandale & Prashad, 1920)

=== Species inquirenda ===
- Culmenella buldowskii Starobogatov & Prozorova, 1990
- Culmenella lindholmi Starobogatov & Prozorova, 1990
