= Babylonia kirana =

Scientific classification
- Kingdom: Animalia
- Phylum: Mollusca
- Class: Gastropoda
- Subclass: Caenogastropoda
- Order: Neogastropoda
- Family: Babyloniidae
- Genus: Babylonia
- Species: B. kirana

Binomial name
- Babylonia kirana Habe, 1965

Synonyms
- Babylonia pallida Kira, 1959; Babylonia pallida Hirase, 1934

Species of gastropod

Babylonia kirana is a species of sea snail, a marine gastropod mollusk, in the family Babyloniidae.
