= Henry Francis Blanford =

British meteorologist (1834–1893)

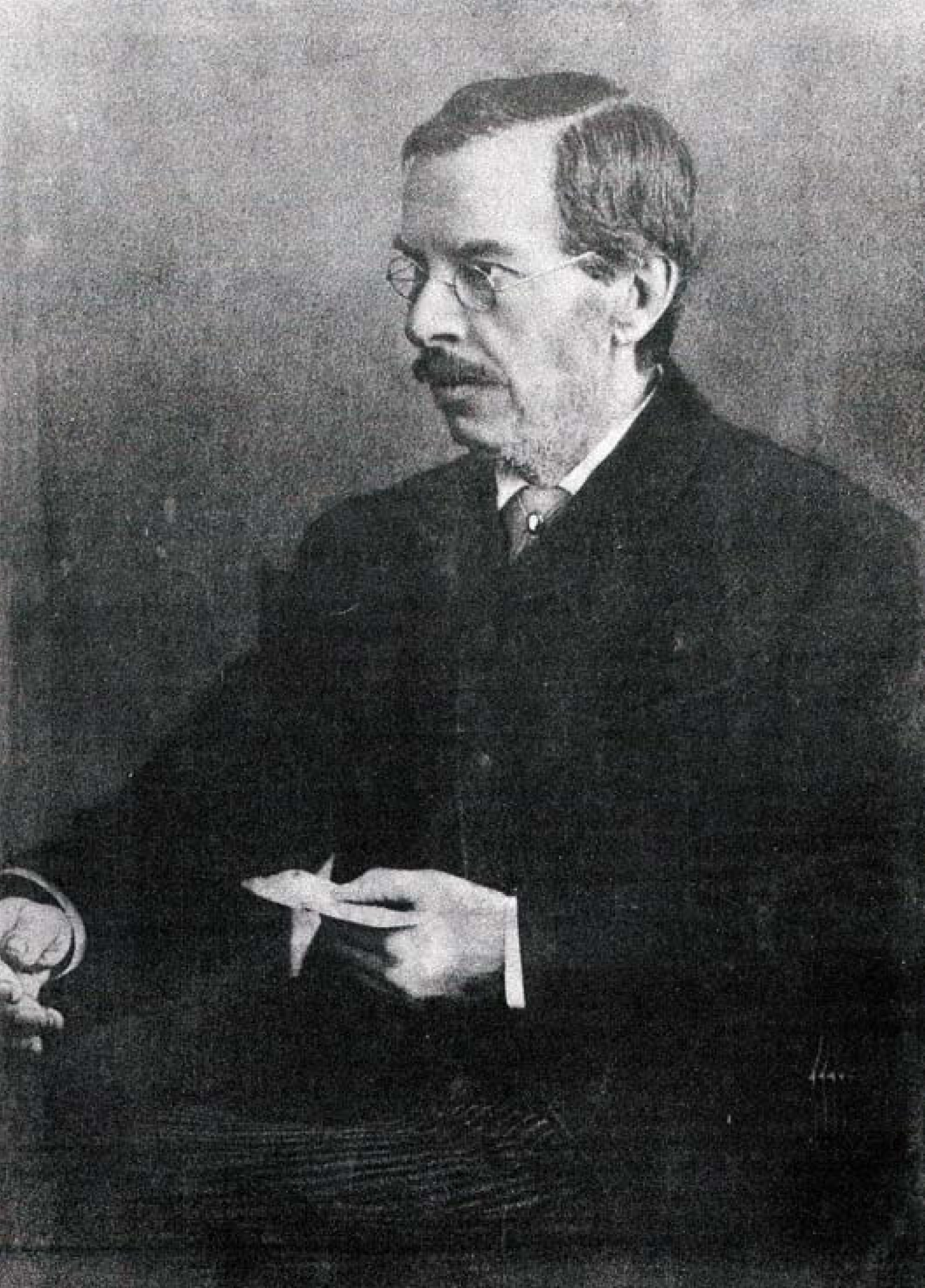
- Born: 3 June 1834; Whitefriars, London, United Kingdom
- Died: 23 January 1893 (aged 58); Folkestone, United Kingdom
- Education: Royal School of Mines (Imperial College London)
- Scientific career
- Fields: Metereology, Paleontology
- Workplaces: India Meteorological Department

Henry Francis Blanford (sometimes spelt Blandford) (3 June 1834 – 23 January 1893) was a British meteorologist and palaeontologist who worked in India. He was a younger brother of the naturalist William Thomas Blanford, both of whom joined the Geological Survey of India in 1855. Henry was the first official meteorologist in India, appointed as Imperial Meteorological Reporter in 1875.

Blanford was born at 27 Bouverie street, Whitefriars, London where his father ran a workshop for gilt mouldings. His early schooling was at Brighton and Brussels. For a while he studied design at Somerset House and Marlborough House before joining the Royal School of Mines, South Kensington in 1851 and studied under Henry De la Beche, Warington Wilkinson Smyth and John Percy. He was the recipient of a scholarship from the Duke of Cornwall. He then studied for a year at the Bergakademie Freiberg (Mining Academy of Freiberg).

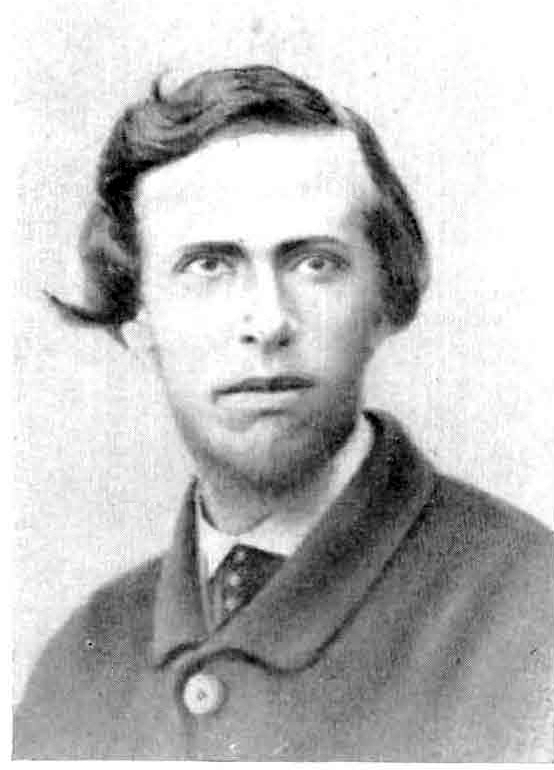
In younger age

Blanford and his brother William joined the Geological Survey of India in 1855 and his first work was to study the coal deposits of Talcher, Orissa (now Odisha). At Talcher he found evidence for the effect of ice in the formation of a boulder bed. From 1856 he was a curator of the Museum of Geology at Calcutta. He was also a delivering lectures at the Presidency College in Calcutta on geology during winters. In 1857 he went to study Cretaceous beds in Tiruchinapalli and near Pondicherry. In 1861, poor health forced him to resign and leave for Europe. He returned the next year to join as a professor of physics and chemistry at the Presidency College, a position that he kept till 1872.

His interest in meteorology grew after his appointment as professor of science at the Presidency College from 1862 to 1874. In 1864, cyclones hit eastern India, killing 70,000 and damaging the port of Calcutta. Blanford co-wrote a report on the subject and was subsequently appointed secretary of the commission created to establish a system of storm warnings to protect Calcutta's harbour. Blanford was appointed Imperial Meteorological Reporter and placed in charge of the Bengal Province Meteorological Department, which covered Calcutta, in 1867. The regionalised nature of these local organisations was soon found to be a problem, and in 1875, the India Meteorological Department was founded, with Blanford in charge. The department would gather data across the country, analyse and disseminate information. He initiated publication of the department's scientific results (Report of the Meteorological Reporter) and made long-term weather forecasts using the link between the nature of snow in the Himalayas and rainfall in the rest of India. Using this method, he was able to predict a deficient monsoon in 1885. Blanford's prediction of drought was noticed by the Australian meteorologist Charles Todd and when another drought occurred in 1888, he realised that there was a synchrony in the events. This was examined later by Gilbert Walker who recognised the global scale of weather phenomena.

He was elected a Fellow of the Geological Society in 1862, Fellow of the Royal Society in 1880 and was a president of the Asiatic Society of Bengal in 1884–85.

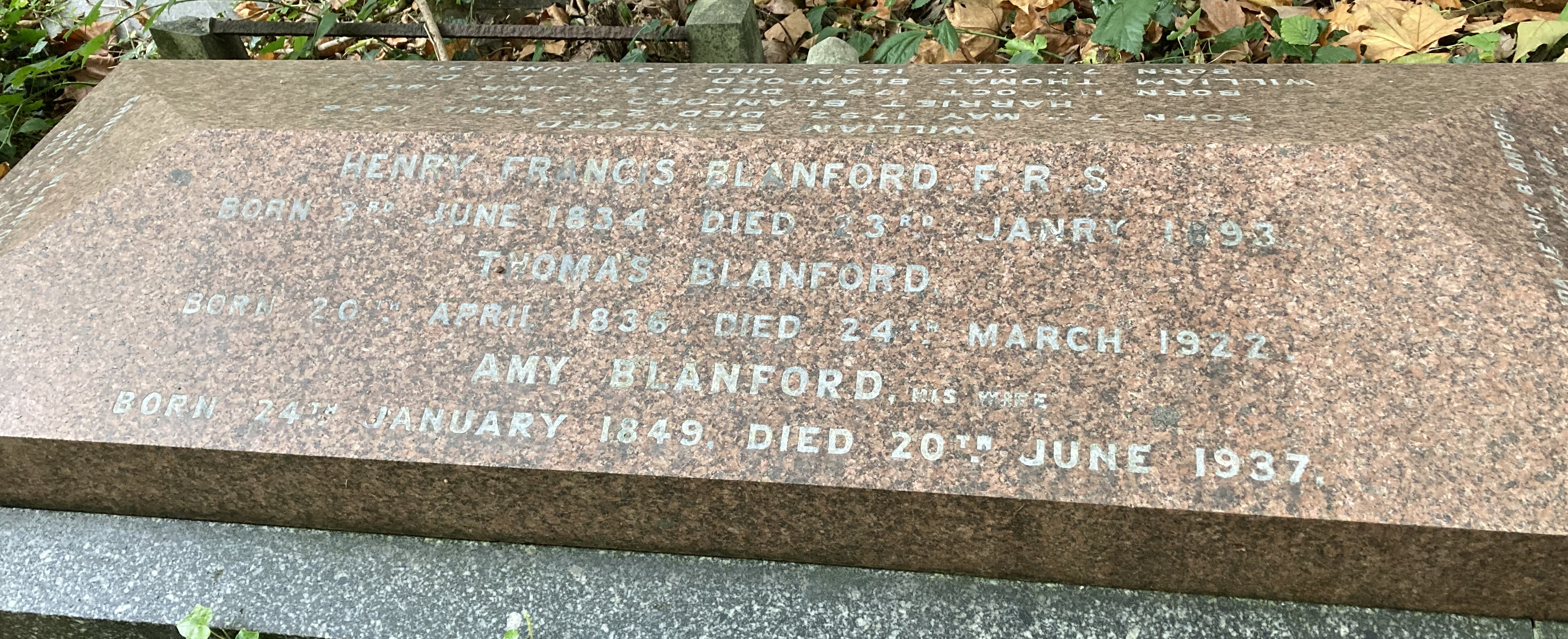
Family vault of Henry Francis Blanford in Highgate Cemetery

On 20 June 1867, Blanford married Charlotte Mackenzie, daughter of George Ferguson Cockburn of the Bengal civil service and granddaughter of Lord Justice Cockburn. They had three daughters and a son. Poor health forced him to return to England and he died of cancer at Folkestone, Kent in 1893. He was buried in a family vault on the western side of Highgate Cemetery.

== Publications ==
- Indian Meteorologist's Vade Mecum (1876)
- Climates and Weather of India (1889)
