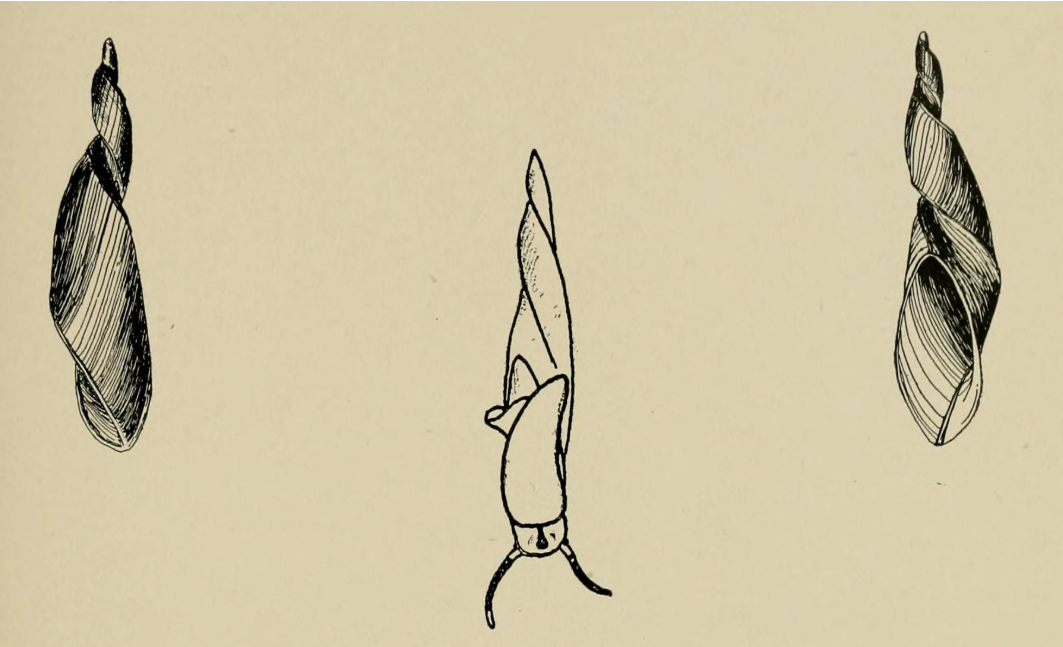

Conservation status
- Data Deficient (IUCN 2.3)

Scientific classification
- Kingdom: Animalia
- Phylum: Mollusca
- Class: Gastropoda
- Superorder: Hygrophila
- Family: Planorbidae
- Genus: Camptoceras
- Species: C. hirasei

Binomial name
- Camptoceras hirasei Walker, 1919

= Camptoceras hirasei =

Species of gastropod

Camptoceras hirasei is a species of air-breathing freshwater snail with a sinistral shell; an aquatic pulmonate gastropod mollusk in the family Planorbidae. It has a needle-like shell with unfused whorls, and eats aquatic vegetation. This species is endemic to Japan.

== Taxonomy ==
Camptoceras hirasei was originally discovered many years before its description by a Mr. Y. Hirase, who bred the species in his personal aquarium. In 1919, Bryant Walker formally described the species from specimens collected near Osaka, Japan. Some databases consider it to have no taxonomic synonyms, though one paper included Camptoceras ijimai (Hirase, 1922). The holotype, or the individual used in the original species description, is located in the University of Michigan's Museum of Zoology. Two paratypes (additional specimens used) can also be found there.

== Description ==
=== Shell ===
Camptoceras hirasei has a very tall, thin, needle-shaped shell. The shell has some amount of variation, and can be slightly curved or straight. The shell height may range in size from about 3 to 8.6 mm (0.12 to 0.34 in). At maximum, the shell measures around 10 mm (0.39 in) in height and around 3 mm (0.12 in) in diameter. The aperture, or the shell opening, is around 3.5 mm (0.14 in) in length. Like other planorbid snails, the shell coils to the left (a condition known as sinistral). There are about 3.5 whorls, or revolutions of the shell. In this species, the whorls are not fused, and are instead separated by a deep channel. The top (apical) whorl comes to a blunt point. A sculpture (3-dimensional structure) consisting of growth lines and other spiralling lines is present. The spiral lines are most prominent on the apical whorl, but fade closer to the body whorl. The aperture is a narrow oval shape, and is wider towards the animal's head.

This species is somewhat similar to Camptoceras terebra, but can be distinguished by its longer, narrower shell. Additionally, the aperture of C. hirasei is less angled, has more prominent growth lines, and less prominent spiralling lines.

=== Mouthparts ===
The radula (a toothy, tongue-like appendage) of this species has been described at least twice, with some discrepancies possibly caused by immature individuals. Walker's original description of the species includes 33 columns of teeth: one central column bordered on each side by 6 columns of lateral teeth, 5 columns of intermediate teeth, and 5 columns of marginal teeth. The bases of the teeth were described as square-shaped, becoming increasingly rectangular from the central to marginal teeth. Another description published just days after Walker's found 29 columns of teeth: one central bordered on each side by 8 laterals and 6 marginals. All teeth except the marginals possessed rounded cusps. Additionally, the lateral and marginal teeth were angled with pointed bases. The two descriptions did agree on some characteristics, however. The central column possesses teeth with 2–4 points (cusps) and a square-shaped base. As the teeth extend away from the center, more tiny cusps appear, and one cusp becomes increasingly prominent.

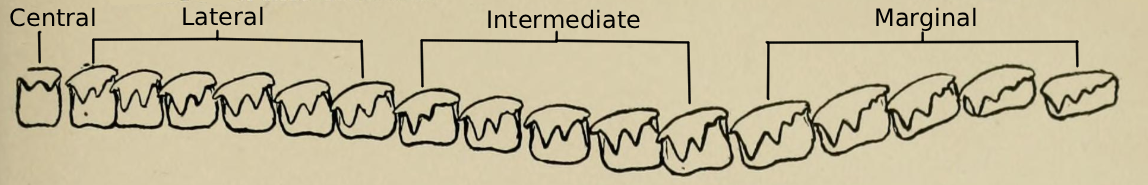
Walker's drawing of the animal's 33-column radula with square tooth bases

The jaws of the animal are composed of 3 plates: one curved cutting plate and two accessory plates. The cutting plate is slightly longer than the accessory plates, and is darker in coloration. The salivary glands are round and may not connect to each other.

=== Other characteristics ===
The eyes of the animal are black. A black oval-shaped spot may be found halfway down each tentacle, though in other specimens may be absent. The presence of this marking is speculated to indicate that the individual has reached maturity. The head is composed of two lobes. A bulge behind the eyes may be present, though its function is not entirely known. The penis sheath, which houses the penis, is wider than the preputium (a muscular organ that helps protrude the penis. A projection of the preputium called the accessory preputial organ is also present, and contains glandular cells. The internal space of this accessory organ connects directly to that of the preputium. Its exact function is not known. The anal pore is bulb-shaped, and is located inside an exterior flap in the mantle (body wall). Ridges in the mantle are present, one towards the top of the animal and one corresponding to the anal pore. A ridge corresponding to the kidneys is not present. The snout of the snail does not project past the foot (a muscular organ used to move).

== Distribution, ecology, and conservation ==
At the time of its original description, Camptoceras hirasei was considered abundant around Osaka. It has also been found in Lake Biwa, Tokyo, and Kyoto. Some sources now claim it to be critically endangered. In 2015, it was rediscovered in a pond at the Okayama Prefectural Nature Conservation Center for the first time in 21 years.

This species may live in marsh environments that periodically dry out. They feed on aquatic vegetation, including Vallisneria and Hydrilla. Like other species of Camptoceras, this species is thought to survive drying out by creating a membrane called an epiphragm. The epiphragm is formed around the shell opening (aperture).
