= Yoichirō Hirase =

Japanese malacologist and business man

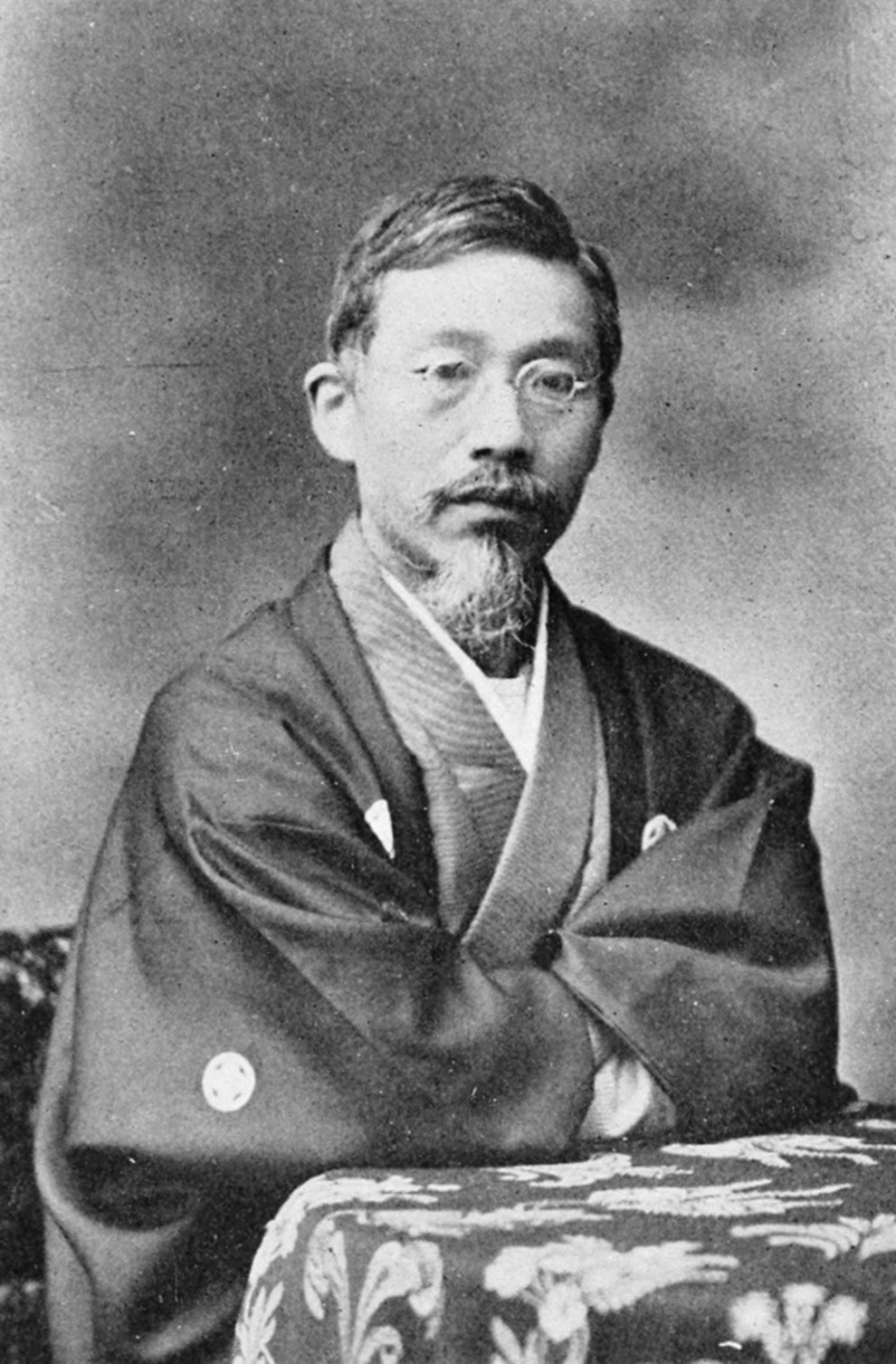
- Yoichirō Hirase
- Born: December 4, 1859; Awaji Island, Japan
- Died: May 25, 1925 (aged 65); Japan
- Scientific career
- Fields: malacology

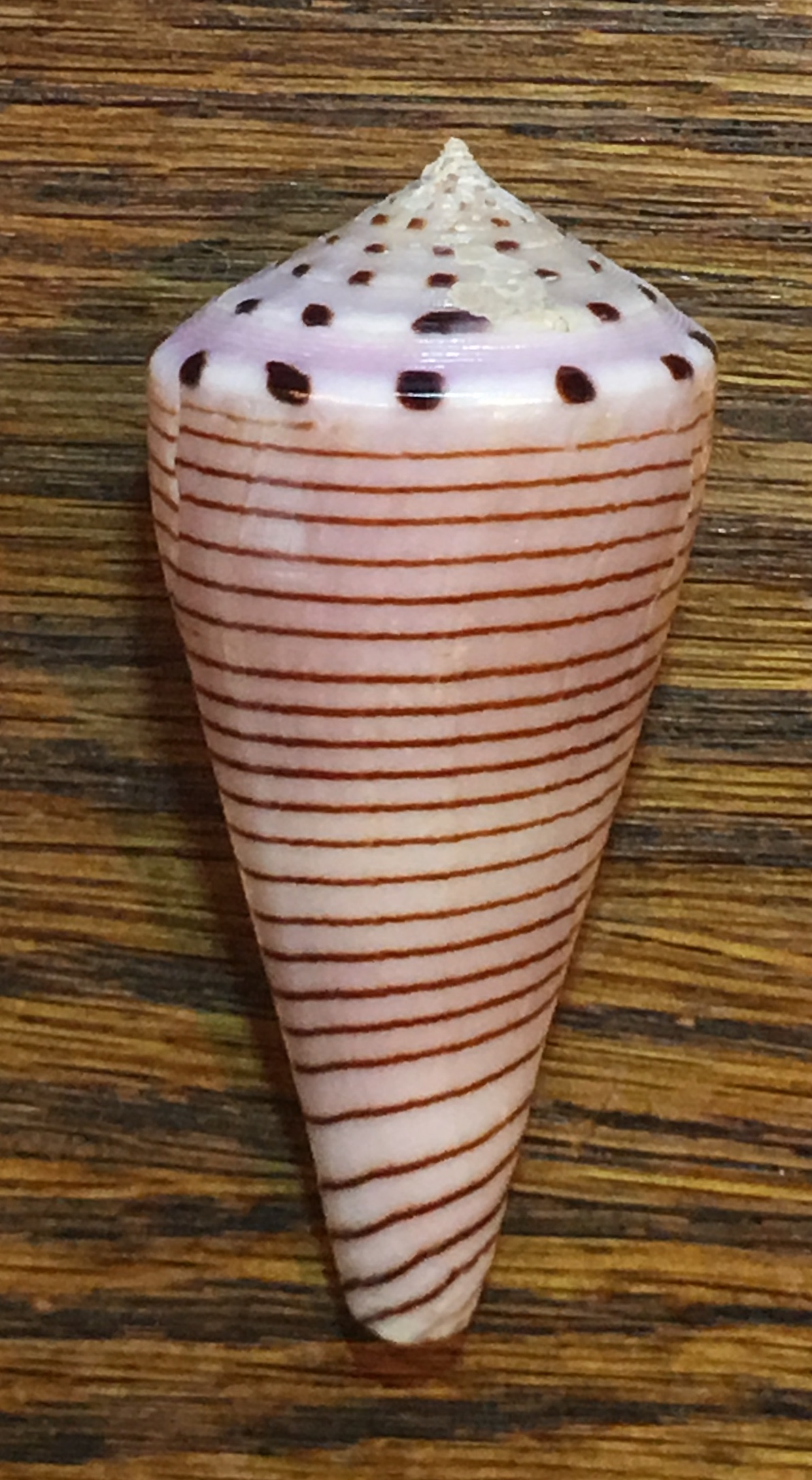
Kioconus hirase (Kuroda, T.,1956)

Yoichirō Hirase (平瀬 與一郎, Hirase Yoichirō; December 4, 1859 – May 25, 1925) was a Japanese malacologist and business man. His son, Shintarō Hirase, (1884–1939) was also a malacologist. The majority of his collection of molluscs were destroyed during World War II.

Yoichirō greatly contributed to the start of malacology in Japan and was responsible for the collection and indirectly the naming of many land and marine mollusks. Revered by malacologists throughout the world for his enthusiasm and contributions to malacology, he has numerous species named after him.

Yoichirō lived from 1859 until 1925. He was a wealthy Kyōto dealer in poultry, seeds, and aviculture products who had founded a side business trading in marine and land shells.[1] He began to collect shells in 1898 at age 39. Over the next 20 years, his collection grew to about 3,000 Japanese specimens and 4,500 foreign specimens. He coordinated numerous field collectors to explore the territories and prefectures of Japan gathering both land and marine mollusks. Many of the species found by his team were newly discovered and named in collaboration with many scientists around the world, including H.A. Pilsbry, P. Ehrmann, G.K. Gude, C.F. Ancey, and G.B. Sowerby.

Yoichirō was the mentor of Tokubei Kuroda, another forefather of Japanese malacology. Kuroda got his start in malacology under the employ of Yoichiro at age 15. Kuroda's employment initially included cleaning Hirase's large house and looking after his children by day. Hirase paid for Kuroda to attend night school and to learn English, at which he excelled, and arranged for him to learn the basics of systematic biology. A rapid learner and diligent clerk, Kuroda was soon placed in charge of the shell business, and became Hirase's secretary. He was instrumental in the founding and operation of Hirase's Conchological Museum (1913–1919), which was situated near the Kyōto Zoo, and handled most of Hirase's correspondence with foreign researchers. He also helped compile and edit Hirase's Conchological Magazine (1907–1915).

Hirase's Conchological museum housed his collection from 1913 until 1919. The museum was compelled to close in 1919 due to his illness and the financial panic brought about by World War I.

At its largest, the Hirase collection grew to 15,000 pieces. Prior to WWII, the collection was split to ensure its survival. One third was donated to various museums, including the Smithsonian, one third was kept at the house of his son, Shintarō Hirase in Tokyo, and the last third was stored in the Research Institute for Natural Resources in Tokyo. The majority of the collection was destroyed during incendiary bombing of Tokyo during the war. Only 5000 pieces, mostly consisting of the minute marine specimens, the land specimens, and fresh water specimens, survived the war. The surviving pieces of the collection have been stored in the Research Institute for Natural Resources in Tokyo since 1948.

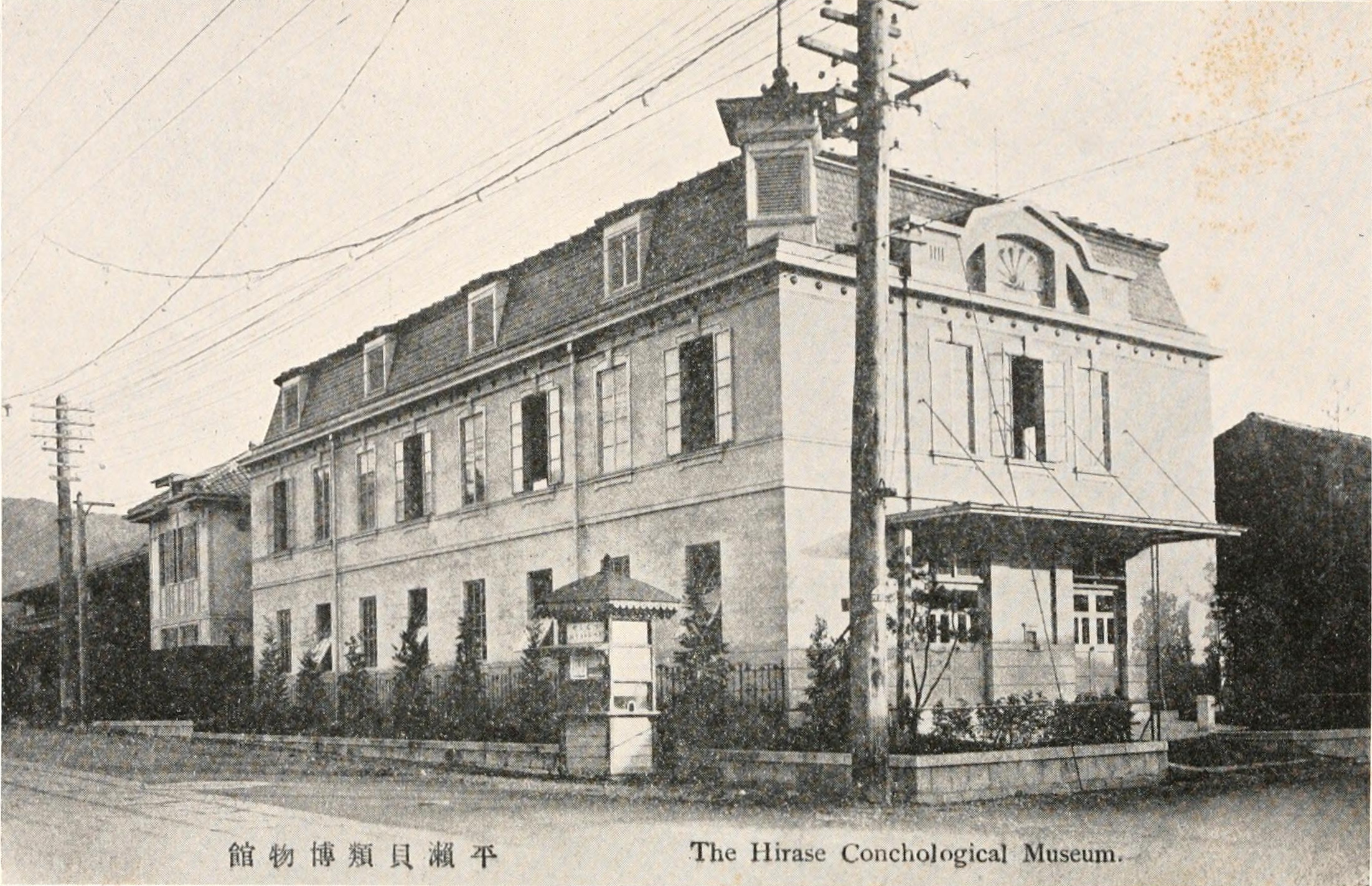
The Hirase Conchological Museum in Kyoto was opened in 1913.

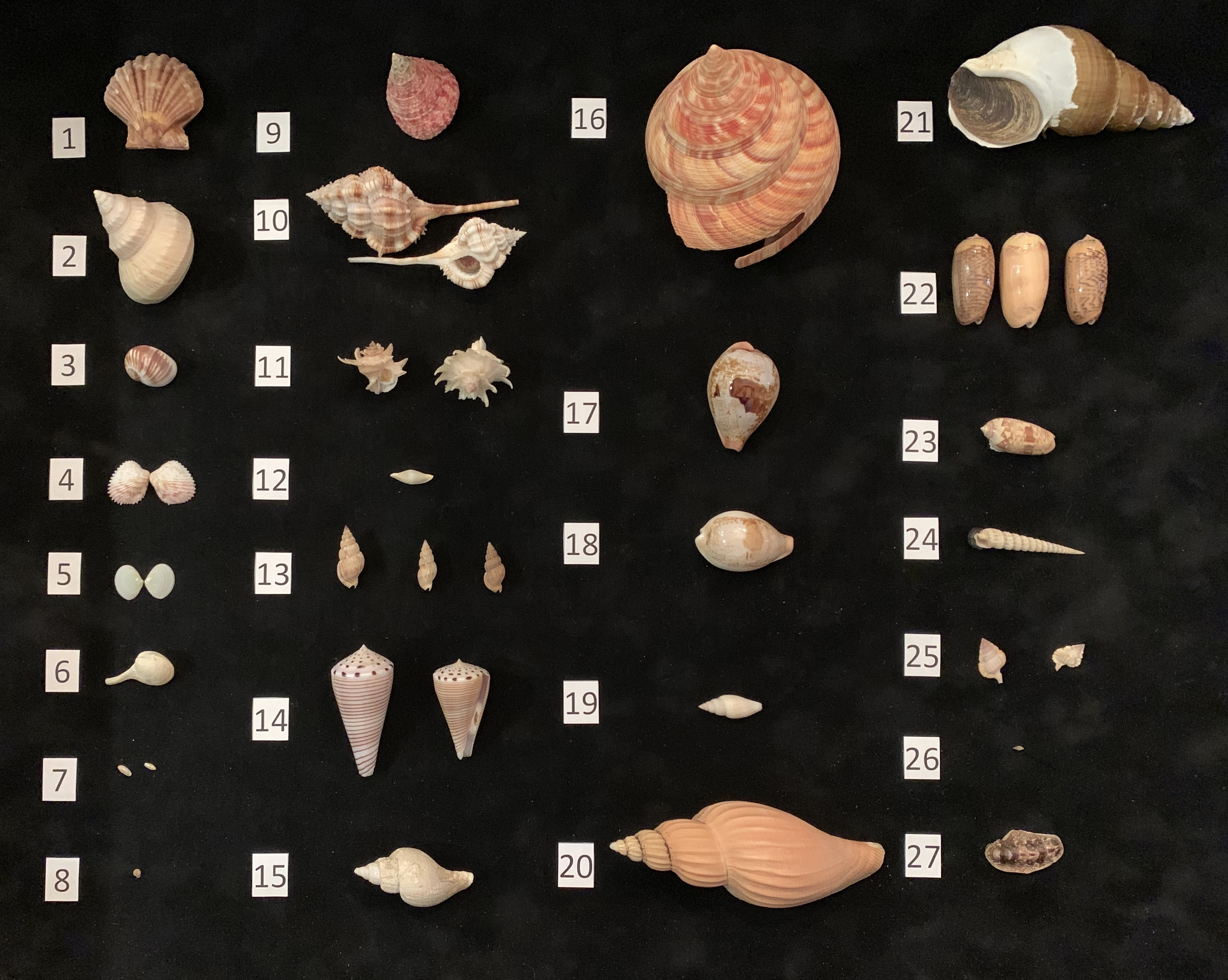
Shells Named After Hirase
