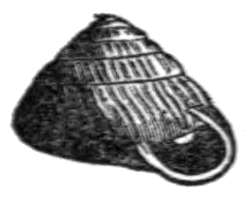
- Engraving showing an apertural view of a shell of Strobilops labyrinthicus

Scientific classification
- Kingdom: Animalia
- Phylum: Mollusca
- Class: Gastropoda
- Order: Stylommatophora
- Suborder: Helicina
- Infraorder: Pupilloidei
- Superfamily: Pupilloidea
- Family: Strobilopsidae; Wenz, 1915

Genera
- See text

Synonyms
- Strobilidae Jooss, 1914 (inv.)

= Strobilopsidae =

Family of gastropods

Strobilopsidae is a family of air-breathing land snails, terrestrial pulmonate gastropod molluscs in the superfamily Pupilloidea.

== Taxonomy ==
The family Strobilopsidae is classified within the informal group Orthurethra, itself belonging to the clade Stylommatophora within the clade Eupulmonata (according to the taxonomy of the Gastropoda by Bouchet & Rocroi, 2005).

The family Strobilopsidae has no subfamilies according to the taxonomy of the Gastropoda by Bouchet & Rocroi (2005).

Some authorities place the family Spelaeodiscidae as a subfamily (Spelaeodiscinae) of the Strobilopsidae.

== Genera ==
Genera within the family Strobilopsidae include:

- Coelostrobilops Pilsbry, 1931
- Discostrobilops Pilsbry, 1927
- Nesostrobilops Pilsbry, 1931
- Enteroplax Gude, 1899
- Eostrobilops Pilsbry, 1927
- Strobilops Pilsbry, 1893 – type genus of the family Strobilopsidae

== Shell description ==
The shell is trochiform, dome-shaped or discoidal and umbilicate. The shell has from four to six slowly enlarging whorls. The aperture is small, oblique, with armature of two or three parietal lamellae and several deeply placed basal folds, all growing continuously from an early neanic stage. The peristome is more or less thickened and expanded, the ends of the lip remote, joined by a parietal callus.

The shell, aside from its helicoid shape (not a character of great importance), differs from all Pupillidae in the arrangement of the lamellae and baso-palatal folds. In multidentate Pupillidae the five primary teeth are always recognizable while in Strobilops only the main parietal lamella and the columellar lamella can certainly be said to correspond, and these are found in so many other land shells that their occurrence is not especially significant. It is possible that upper and lower palatal folds of Pupillidae are represented by teeth 5 (the most right basal tooth) and 2 (second left basal tooth), and the basal fold by tooth 1 (the most left basal tooth).

By the accelerated lamellae and folds of the shell, which appear early in the neanic stage, Strobilops resembles various Tornatellininae (within Achatinellidae). In that family both parietal and palatal folds or laminae are sometimes present in the neanic stage. Various pupillid genera also, such as Orcula (Orculidae) and Lauria (Lauriidae), have apertural armature during the neanic stage. Orcula has spiral parietal and columellar lamellae but no basal or palatal folds. Lauria has basal folds, but they are spaced, transverse barriers, wholly unlike the adult basal or palatal armature of the species, and differing equally from the folds of immature Strobilops, which from their inception appear to develop continuously into those of the adult shell. It appears likely that the acceleration or early appearance of apertural armature in Tornatellininae, Orcula, Lauria and Strobilops has been independent in the four groups, and is not indicative of direct relationship between any of them.

== Anatomy ==
The urethra lies very near the last part of the intestine.

Digestive system: The jaw has numerous ribs. Radula with tricuspid central tooth with square basal plate, as large as the bicuspid laterals, the marginals multicuspid.

Reproductive system: Ovotestis forms two groups of follicles. Penis is continued in a long epiphallus and bears a long appendix, with swollen basal and distal divisions, the penial retractor bifurcate, one branch inserted on the epiphallus, the other on the base of the appendix (distally it attaches to the right ocular retractor, according to G. Dallas Hanna).

By the structure of the male organs Strobilops resembles Vallonia, Pupilla, Lauria, the Achatinellidae, and some other groups are similar in having a bifurcate penial retractor and a long, tripartite appendix. If G. Dallas Hanna is right in stating that the penial retractor is a branch of the right ocular band, this is an important difference from any known Orthurethra. The mouth parts do not differ materially from some Pupillidae.

== Fossil distribution ==
Strobilopsidae appeared in the Upper Eocene of western Europe in several species having all the external characters of the genus Strobilops, and though the internal structure has not been worked out (in 1927), it is safe to assume that they are closely related to the well-known Oligocene forms following them. In Europe this genus continued in numerous species into the Pliocene, the last one in the Upper Pliocene (Astian stage) of Piedmont.

In late Cretaceous beds there are various forms described as Helix, or under the names Obbinula and Pseudostrobilus, which certainly have some of the characters of Strobilops. All are larger than any Strobilops.
