= Didacna trigonoides =

Didacna trigonoides Temporal range: Late Pleistocene – present

Scientific classification
- Kingdom: Animalia
- Phylum: Mollusca
- Class: Bivalvia
- Order: Cardiida
- Family: Cardiidae
- Genus: Didacna
- Species: D. trigonoides

Binomial name
- Didacna trigonoides (Pallas, 1771)

Synonyms
- Cardium trigonoides Pallas, 1771; Cardium trilaterum Gmelin, 1774; Didacna trigonoides tuzetae Tadjalli-Pour, 1977

Species of bivalve mollusc

Didacna trigonoides is a species of bivalve mollusc found only in the brackish waters of the Caspian Sea. A member of the cockle family, Cardiidae, it has a rounded triangular shell measuring 40–65 mm (1.6–2.6 in) in length, with a whitish or pale yellow surface and smooth, stripe-like brown ribs. The species occurs at depths of 3–60 m (9.8–196.9 ft) and is sedentary, burrowing into the sediment and filtering out suspended food particles such as algae. Known predators include the Caspian roach (Rutilus caspicus) and the non-native crab Rhithropanopeus harrisii. Shells of this bivalve are a common occurrence in the Holocene deposits of the Caspian Sea.

== Taxonomy ==
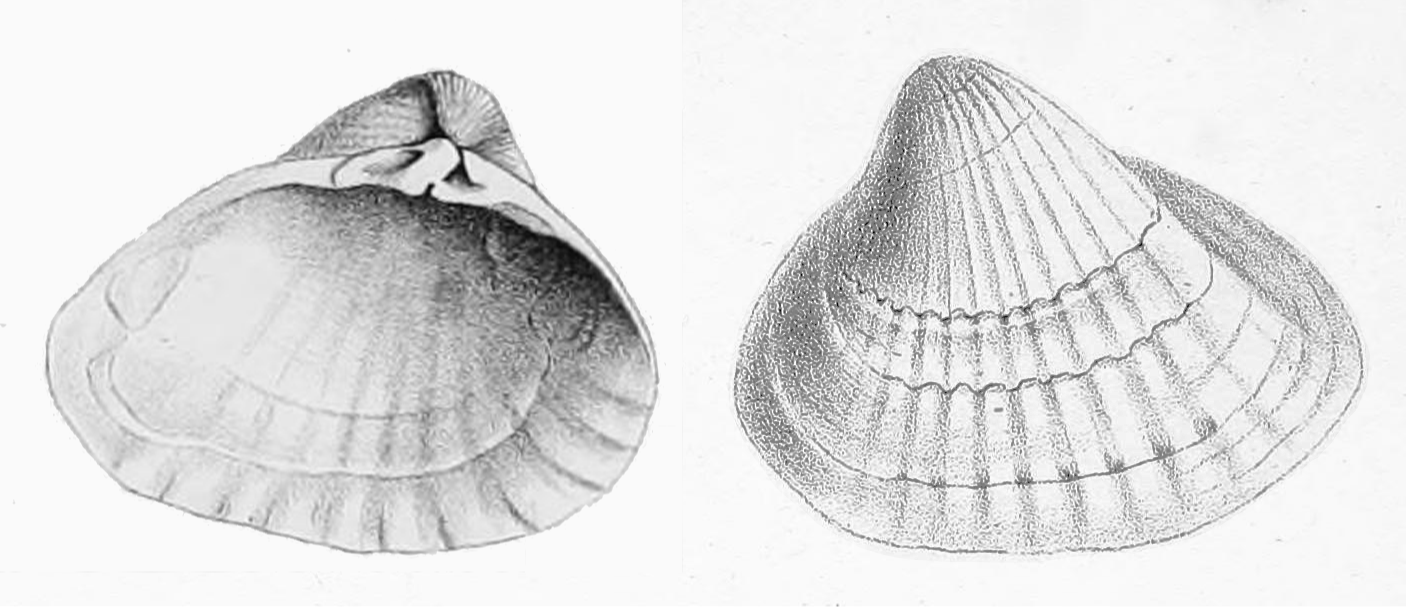
Illustrations of Didacna trigonoides by Karl Eichwald (1841)

In 1771, Peter Simon Pallas scientifically described the bivalve mollusc Cardium trigonoides, referring to it as "copiosissima testa Maris Caspii" ("the most abundant shell of the Caspian Sea"). The species was independently named Cardium trilaterum by Samuel Gottlieb Gmelin, but this name was not widely used and was published in 1774, three years after the description by Pallas, making it a junior synonym of C. trigonoides. Karl Eichwald moved the mollusc into the newly established genus Didacna in 1838 and was the first to illustrate its shell in 1841. Ferdinand Stoliczka subsequently chose Didacna trigonoides as the type species of its genus in 1870. As the original material described by Pallas is now considered lost, the Russian palaeontologist Lidya Alexandrovna Nevesskaja selected a neotype (new name-bearing specimen) for D. trigonoides in 2007. This shell, collected on the shore of Chechen Island by Nicolai Ivanovich Andrusov, is housed at the Paleontological Institute of the Russian Academy of Sciences in Moscow.

A number of varieties of D. trigonoides were recognized in the 19th and 20th centuries based on differences in shell structure, although none of these are distinguished in modern research. A subspecies, D. trigonoides tuzetae, described in 1977 by Mahdi Tadjalli-Pour from the vicinity of Astara and Tālesh in Iran, has since been regarded as a synonym of D. trigonoides. Furthermore, two fossil subspecies were established in a 1967 work by Alexander Adamovich Svitoch: D. trigonoides chasarica from the Khazarian stage of the Caspian Sea (Middle Pleistocene) and D. trigonoides chvalynica from the Khvalynian stage (Late Pleistocene). Subsequent studies recognized D. trigonoides chvalynica either as a synonym of D. ebersini or D. praetrigonoides. D. praetrigonoides itself was sometimes treated as a subspecies of D. trigonoides, but this classification is no longer accepted.

=== Fossil record and evolution ===
D. trigonoides is among the most widespread and common mollusc species in the Holocene sediments of the Caspian Sea, together with D. baeri, D. eichwaldi and Cerastoderma glaucum. These sediments are assigned to the sea's current Novocaspian stage and are all dated to be less than 7,000 years old. Although D. trigonoides emerged in the Caspian Sea earlier, towards the end of the Khvalynian stage in the Late Pleistocene, it was much rarer than other bivalves of this time. Palaeontologists commonly classify the mollusc into the trigonoides or "trigonoid" group alongside similar, possibly closely related members of its genus, such as the living D. pyramidata and the fossil species D. subpyramidata, D. paleotrigonoides and D. praetrigonoides. Nevesskaja suggested that both D. trigonoides and D. pyramidata descended from D. praetrigonoides, a species characteristic of Khvalynian sediments that became rare in the Holocene and is presumably extinct.

== Description ==
The shell of Didacna trigonoides consists of two halves or valves. Each valve is rounded triangular, convex and thick-walled, possessing a distinctly protruding umbo (top) and reaching 40–65 mm (1.6–2.6 in) in length. The outer surface of the shell is whitish or pale yellow and has 20–30 smooth tan to red-brown ribs, which give it a striped appearance. A conspicuous ridge or keel runs down the umbo, becoming smooth towards the margin. This keel sometimes bears a sharp rib that is most pronounced in juveniles and disappears with age. The interior of the shell is white, with a reddish-brown stain at the posterior end, grooves that match the ribs of the exterior and two muscle scars that correspond to the mollusc's adductor muscles. The hinge (structure that keeps the valves aligned) consists of two small teeth (projections) below the umbo of each valve. One tooth in each pair is larger than the other, and both are separated by a small pit.

=== Similar species ===
D. pyramidata from the central and southern parts of the Caspian Sea differs from D. trigonoides by having a less inflated shell, with a less pronounced umbo and a greater number of ribs. Juveniles may be confused with the smaller-sized D. barbotdemarnii, which has a more elongate, compressed shell and slightly more ribs. Another similar species is the possibly extinct D. praetrigonoides, mainly known from the Late Pleistocene deposits of the Caspian Sea, whose shells occasionally wash ashore. Compared to D. trigonoides, its shell is often larger, has a less prominent triangular shape and a greater number of ribs. The fossil bivalve D. subpyramidata from the Middle–Late Pleistocene also resembles D. trigonoides, being distinguished by a less elongated and somewhat less inflated shell, with a lower umbo and more numerous ribs.

== Distribution and ecology ==
Didacna trigonoides is found only in the Caspian Sea, where it is widespread, being the only species of its genus to inhabit most of the northern part of the sea. It lives in brackish water on sand, mud, among shell debris and on other types of hard bottoms at depths between 3 and 60 m (9.8 and 196.9 ft). The species occurs within a restricted salinity range, preferring areas with salinities of 7–12‰, but does not survive at levels under 2.3‰ or over 15‰. A sedentary filter feeder, it burrows into the sediment, exposing its short siphons (tube-like organs for pumping water) and feeding on suspended food particles such as algae and mollusc larvae. Accompanying bivalve species include D. barbotdemarnii, D. eichwaldi, D. longipes, Cerastoderma glaucum, Monodacna caspia and the zebra mussel (Dreissena polymorpha). The Caspian roach (Rutilus caspicus) and the non-native crab Rhithropanopeus harrisii are known predators of D. trigonoides.
