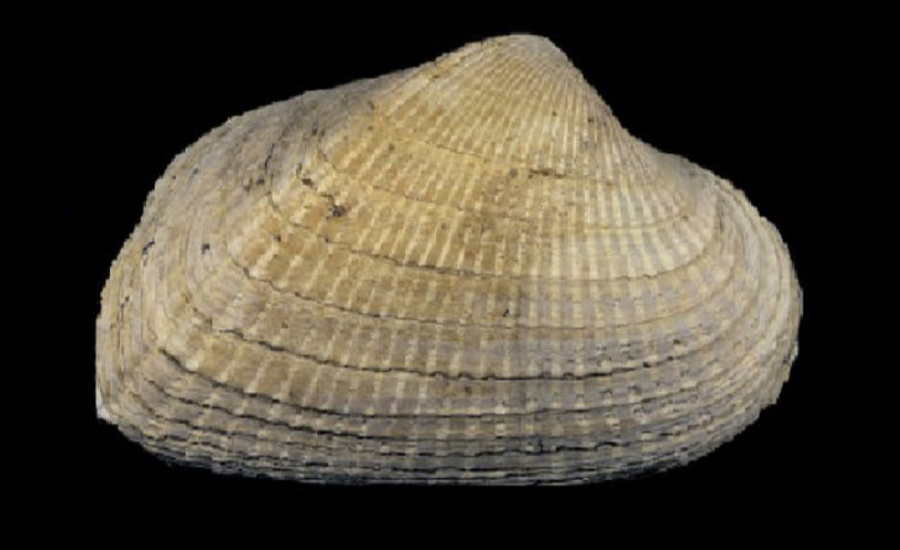
- Shell from the Late Pleistocene deposits of the Caspian Sea (Dagestan, Russia)

Scientific classification
- Kingdom: Animalia
- Phylum: Mollusca
- Class: Bivalvia
- Order: Cardiida
- Family: Cardiidae
- Genus: Didacna
- Species: D. parallella

Binomial name
- Didacna parallella Bogachev, 1932

Synonyms
- Didacna parallella var. borealis Fedorov, 1953

= Didacna parallella =

Species of brackish-water bivalve

Didacna parallella is a brackish-water bivalve mollusc of the family Cardiidae, the cockles. It has an oval, rounded-trapezoidal or trapezoidal, thin, cream or tan shell, up to 30–55 mm (1.2–2.2 in) in length, with an off-centered umbo and flattened ribs. The species is endemic to the Caspian Sea. It lives in the Southern Caspian and along the western coast of the Middle Caspian at depths between 50 and 85 m (164–279 ft).

== Description ==
Didacna parallella has an oval, rounded-trapezoidal or trapezoidal, thin, moderately convex shell, with an anteriorly displaced umbo, 29–42 flattened radial ribs and a posterior ridge, which is marked by a thickened rib. The shell length is up to 30–55 mm (1.2–2.2 in). The external coloration is cream or tan. The interior is cream, with a reddish brown stain on the posterior margin. The hinge consists of two cardinal teeth in the right valve and one cardinal tooth in the left valve.

== Distribution and ecology ==
Didacna parallella is endemic to the Caspian Sea. It lives in the Southern Caspian and along the western coast of the Middle Caspian at depths between 50 and 85 m (164–279 ft). Records from depths of 200–300 m (660–980 ft) in the southern Caspian Sea off Azerbaijan are uncertain.

J. J. ter Poorten (2024) noted that D. parallella could be extinct due to the lack of recent records of living specimens. F. P. Wesselingh and co-authors (2019) have stated that live records are known at least until 1986 and the species is unlikely to be extinct.

== Fossil record ==
Didacna parallella occurs in the Late Pleistocene (Hyrcanian and Khvalynian) and Holocene (Neocaspian) deposits of the Caspian Sea.

== Taxonomy ==
The species was described by Russian and Soviet geologist Vladimir Vladimirovich Bogachev in 1932 from fossil shells found in the Late Pleistocene (Lower Khvalynian) deposits of Qala in Azerbaijan (the type locality of the species). The type series is lost. In 2007 Lidiya Aleksandrovna Nevesskaja designated one of the specimens illustrated by Bogachev as the lectotype of the species.

In 1969 Boris Mikhailovich Logvinenko and Yaroslav Igorevich Starobogatov treated D. parallella as an extant species. This view has been accepted in later works on the molluscs of the present-day Caspian Sea. Nevesskaja (2007), however, considered it an extinct species that only occurs in the Late Pleistocene (Lower and Upper Khvalynian) beds of the sea.

Some authors have used the incorrect spelling Didacna parallela for this species.

Didacna parallella var. borealis is a small-sized variety described by P. V. Fedorov from fossil material in 1953. A. A. Svitoch (1967) listed it as a synonym of D. parallella. G. I. Popov (1983) classified it as a subspecies of Didacna subcatillus. Nevesskaja (2007) treated the variety as a possible synonym of D. parallella.

== Cited texts ==
- Kijashko, P. V. (2013). "Mollyuski Kaspiyskogo morya" [Molluscs of the Caspian sea]. In Bogutskaya, N. G.; Kijashko, P. V.; Naseka, A. M.; Orlova, M. I. (eds.). Identification keys for fish and invertebrates of the Caspian Sea (in Russian). Vol. 1. Fish and molluscs. St. Petersburg; Moscow: KMK Scientific Press Ltd. pp. 298–392. ISBN 978-5-87317-932-9.
- Logvinenko, B. M.; Starobogatov, Y. I. (1969). "Tip Mollyuski. Mollusca" [Phylum Molluscs. Mollusca]. In Birshteyn, Y. A.; Vinogradov, L. G.; Kondakov, N. N.; Kuhn, M. S.; Astakhova, T. V.; Romanova, N. N. (eds.). Atlas bespozvonochnykh Kaspiyskogo morya [Atlas of the Invertebrates of the Caspian Sea] (in Russian). Moscow: Pishchevaya Promyshlennost. pp. 308–385.
