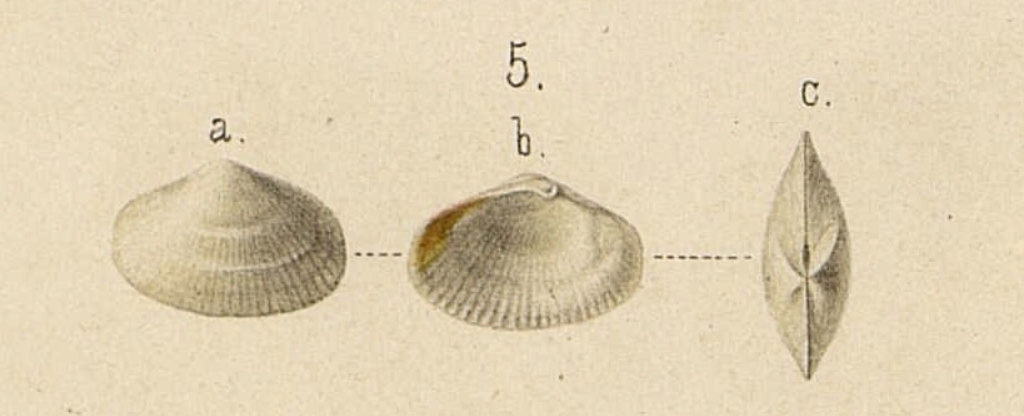

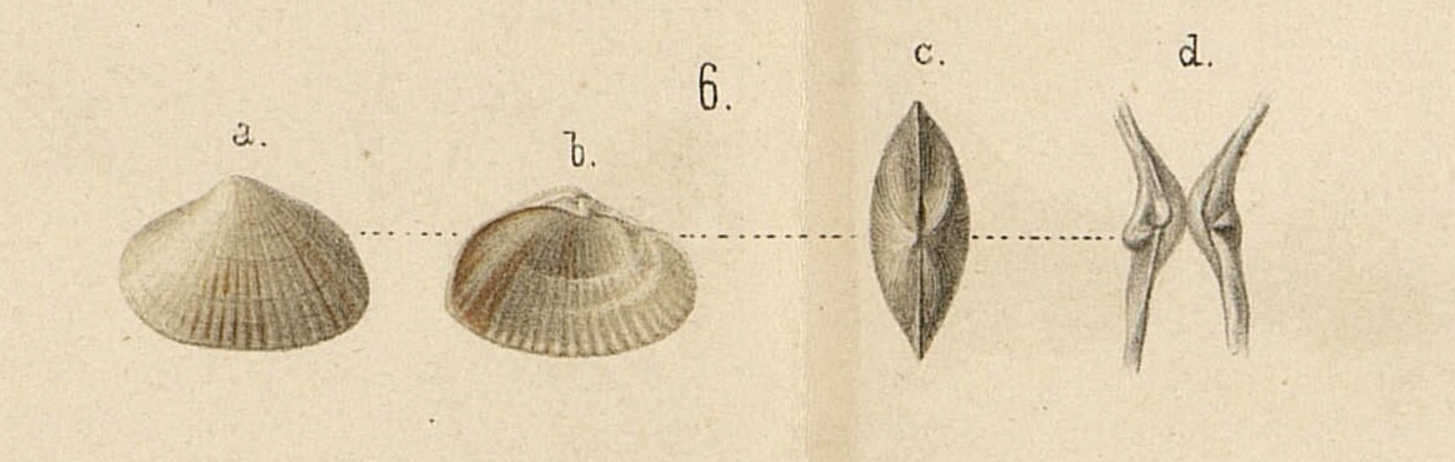
- Illustrations of Cardium barbotdemarnii from Oscar Grimm's publication (1877)

Scientific classification
- Kingdom: Animalia
- Phylum: Mollusca
- Class: Bivalvia
- Order: Cardiida
- Family: Cardiidae
- Genus: Didacna
- Species: D. barbotdemarnii

Binomial name
- Didacna barbotdemarnii (Grimm, 1877)

= Didacna barbotdemarnii =

Species of brackish-water bivalve

Didacna barbotdemarnii is a brackish-water bivalve mollusc of the family Cardiidae, the cockles. It has a broadly oval, thick, cream shell, up to 30 mm (1.2 in) in length, with a low umbo and flattened ribs, which are often highlighted only by color. The species is endemic to the Caspian Sea. It lives in the Southern and Middle Caspian as well as in the southern part of the Northern Caspian at depths from 0 to 40 m (0 to 131 ft). It is named after Russian geologist Nikolai Pavlovich Barbot-de-Marny.

== Description ==
Didacna barbotdemarnii has a broadly oval, thick, moderately convex shell, with a weakly protruding umbo, 19–26 flattened radial ribs, which are often highlighted only by color, and a posterior ridge, which can be smooth or is often marked by a sharp rib. The shell length is up to 30 mm (1.2 in), the height is up to 20 mm (0.79 in), and the convexity is up to 13 mm (0.51 in). The external coloration is cream, with thin yellowish green periostracum. The interior is white, with a brown-red stain on the posterior margin. The hinge consists of two cardinal teeth in the right valve and one cardinal tooth in the left valve.

=== Similar species ===
The juveniles of Didacna longipes differ from those of D. barbotdemarnii by having thicker shells, with more pronounced growth lines, more ribs, a somewhat narrower umbo, less sharp posterior ridge, wider anterior margin and a less elongated posterior margin.

The shells of juvenile Didacna trigonoides are less elongated, more inflated and have less ribs.

The fossil species Didacna ebersini has a less elongated and slightly more convex shell, with a lower apical angle of the umbo.

== Distribution and ecology ==
Didacna barbotdemarnii is endemic to the Caspian Sea. It lives in the Southern and Middle Caspian as well as in the southern part of the Northern Caspian at depths from 0 to 30–40 m (0 to 98–131 ft). The species prefers sandy bottoms and often occurs together with D. longipes.

A study of growth rate in D. barbotdemarnii suggests that the average life span of the species is 7 years. It reaches maturity at the age of 2 years and the growth rate slows down after 6 years.

== Fossil record ==
Didacna barbotdemarnii occurs in the Holocene deposits of the Caspian Sea. In an article published in 2007, Lidiya Aleksandrovna Nevesskaja hypothesized that the species descended from the Late Pleistocene D. ebersini.

== Taxonomy ==
The species was first described in 1877 as Cardium Barbot-de-Marnii by Russian zoologist Oscar Andreevich Grimm from specimens collected during the Aral-Caspian expedition in 1876. It was named in honor of Russian geologist Nikolai Pavlovich Barbot-de-Marny who participated in Grimm's expedition in 1874. The type locality of D. barbotdemarnii is in the Caspian Sea off Kazakhstan (44°17'N, 50°22'E) at a depth of 13 m (43 ft). One of Grimm's specimens from this locality is kept in the Zoological Institute of the Russian Academy of Sciences and has been designated as the lectotype of the species by Boris Mikhailovich Logvinenko and Yaroslav Igorevich Starobogatov in 1967.

Several authors have incorrectly referred to this species as Didacna barbotdemarnyi.

In a 2007 revision of the genus Didacna L. A. Nevesskaja believed that D. longipes is a poorly defined species and described the new species Didacna carinata. According to the description D. carinata is similar to D. barbotdemarnii and differs by a more pronounced posterior ridge, more protruding umbo, more convex shell and less developed cardinal teeth. In 2013 Pavel Vladimirovich Kijashko have confirmed the validity of D. longipes, but questioned the taxonomic status of D. carinata, which has been treated as a possible synonym of both D. longipes and D. barbotdemarnii.

== Cited texts ==
- Kijashko, P. V. (2013). "Mollyuski Kaspiyskogo morya" [Molluscs of the Caspian sea]. In Bogutskaya, N. G.; Kijashko, P. V.; Naseka, A. M.; Orlova, M. I. (eds.). Identification keys for fish and invertebrates of the Caspian Sea (in Russian). Vol. 1. Fish and molluscs. St. Petersburg; Moscow: KMK Scientific Press Ltd. pp. 298–392. ISBN 978-5-87317-932-9.
- Logvinenko, B. M.; Starobogatov, Y. I. (1969). "Tip Mollyuski. Mollusca" [Phylum Molluscs. Mollusca]. In Birshteyn, Y. A.; Vinogradov, L. G.; Kondakov, N. N.; Kuhn, M. S.; Astakhova, T. V.; Romanova, N. N. (eds.). Atlas bespozvonochnykh Kaspiyskogo morya [Atlas of the Invertebrates of the Caspian Sea] (in Russian). Moscow: Pishchevaya Promyshlennost. pp. 308–385.
- ter Poorten, J. J. (2024). A taxonomic iconography of living Cardiidae. Harxheim: ConchBooks. ISBN 978-3-948603-48-9.
