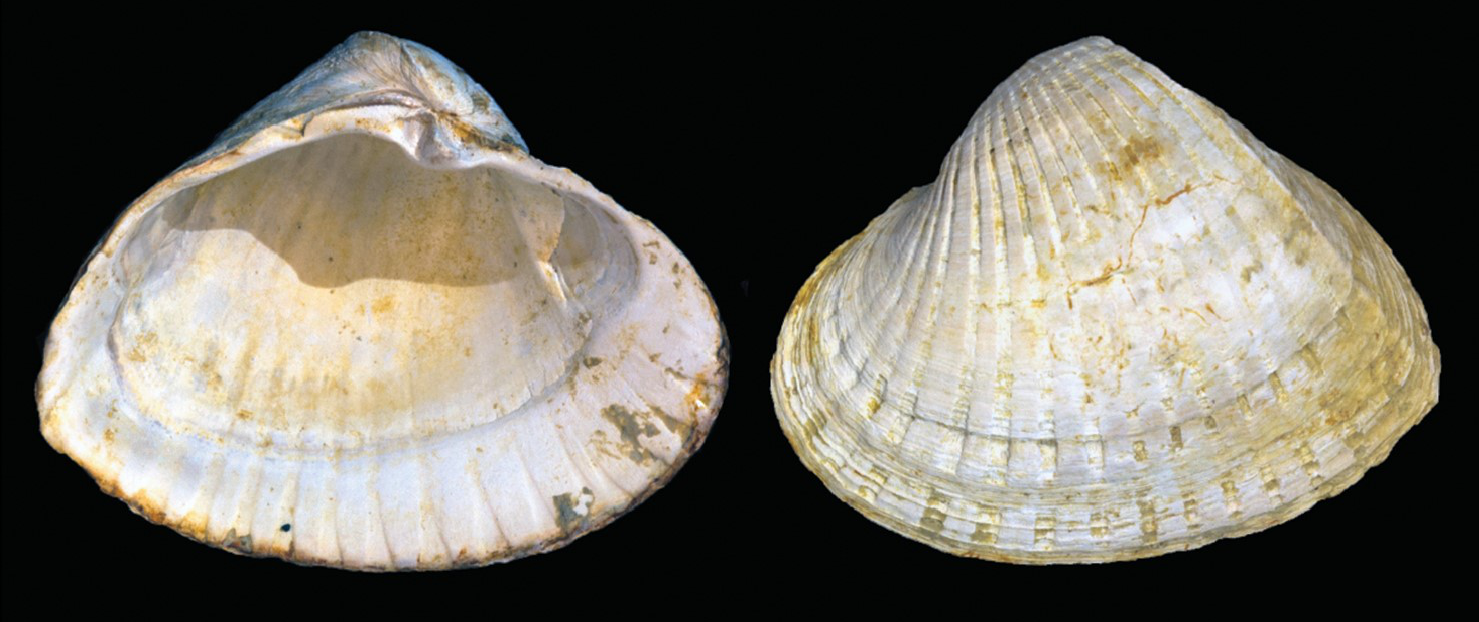
- Shell from the Holocene deposits of the Caspian Sea (Dagestan, Russia)

Scientific classification
- Kingdom: Animalia
- Phylum: Mollusca
- Class: Bivalvia
- Order: Cardiida
- Family: Cardiidae
- Genus: Didacna
- Species: D. eichwaldi

Binomial name
- Didacna eichwaldi (Krynicki, 1837)

Synonyms
- Cardium crassum Eichwald, 1829; Didacna pseudoprotracta Livental, 1931

= Didacna eichwaldi =

Species of brackish-water bivalve

Didacna eichwaldi is a brackish-water bivalve mollusc of the family Cardiidae, the cockles. It has an oval-triangular, thick, whitish or cream shell, up to 40–55 mm (1.6–2.2 in) in length, with flattened ribs and a distinctly sharp posterior ridge in juveniles. The species is endemic to the Caspian Sea. It lives in the middle and southern parts of the sea at depths down to 35 m (115 ft) and does not occur in desalinated areas.

== Description ==
Didacna eichwaldi has an oval-triangular, thick, convex shell, with a moderately or strongly protruding umbo, 21–34 flattened radial ribs and a distinctly sharp posterior ridge in juveniles, which becomes smoother with age. The shell length is up to 40–55 mm (1.6–2.2 in), the height is up to 30–45 mm (1.2–1.8 in). The coloration is whitish or cream. The hinge consists of two cardinal teeth in the right valve and one cardinal tooth in the left valve. The juveniles sometimes have weakly developed lateral teeth.

=== Similar species ===
Didacna baeri has a more rounded oval shell, with a less protruding umbo and a smooth posterior ridge.

Several fossil species resemble D. eichwaldi. Didacna nalivkini has a less elongated shell, with a less distinct posterior ridge on the umbo. Didacna eulachia differs by a more elongated and less equilateral shell, with a larger number of ribs. Didacna ovatocrassa has a less protruding umbo and a less distinct posterior ridge. The shell of Didacna subcrassa is less elongated.

== Distribution and ecology ==
Didacna eichwaldi is endemic to the Caspian Sea. It lives in the middle and southern parts of the sea at depths down to 35 m (115 ft) and does not occur in desalinated areas.

== Fossil record ==
Didacna eichwaldi is widespread in the Holocene (Neocaspian) deposits on the coasts of the middle and southern parts of the Caspian Sea. The oldest records date to the Late Pleistocene (Upper Khvalynian deposits).

== Taxonomy ==
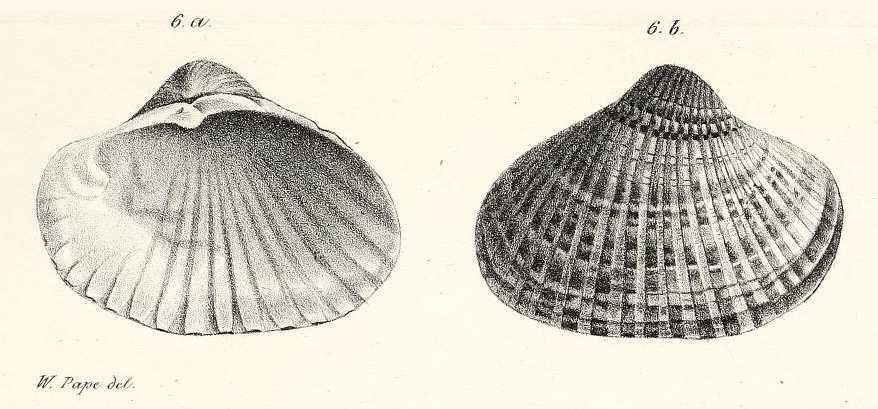
Illustrations of Didacna crassa from Eichwald's publication (1841)

The species was first described as Cardium crassum by Karl Eichwald in 1829, who never observed living individuals of this bivalve and only found numerous empty shells. In 1838 he transferred it to the newly described genus Didacna and in 1841 he published the first illustrations of the species, commenting on how it seemingly "died out only a century ago".

The type locality of the species as indicated by Eichwald is "Caspium mare" (Caspian Sea). The type specimens have not been located.

The original name of this species is a junior homonym of Cardium crassum Gmelin, 1791. In 1837 Ivan Andreevich Krynicki introduced a replacement name, Cardium eichwaldi. Despite this, Eichwald and many subsequent authors referred to the species under the invalid name Didacna crassa. The homonymy was noted in 2019 by F. P. Wesselingh and co-authors, who referred to the species under its currently accepted name Didacna eichwaldi.

Logvinenko and Starobogatov (1969) treated this species as a junior synonym of D. baeri. This synonymy was followed in catalogues of extant molluscs of Russia and by Kijashko (2013), but was not accepted by some other authors such as Yanina (2005) and Nevesskaja (2007). Wesselingh et al. (2019) and subsequent authors treated these species as distinct due to differences in shell characteristics.

Didacna pseudoprotracta is an extinct species described by Livental (1931) from the Middle Pleistocene (Chaudian) deposits of the Chauda Cape (Kerch Peninsula, Crimea) and Guria (Georgia). He noted that the species resembles the extant Didacna protracta, but is probably more closely related to the extinct Didacna pseudocrassa. Nevesskaja (1963) regarded D. pseudoprotracta as a synonym of D. crassa, although in her view D. crassa was present in the Pleistocene of the Black Sea region and was classified into multiple fossil subspecies (such as D. crassa guriensis) which are now recognized as distinct species. J. J. ter Poorten (2024) listed D. pseudoprotracta as a questionable synonym of D. eichwaldi.

== Cited texts ==
- Yanina, Т. А. (2005). Didakny Ponto-Kaspiya [Didacnas of the Ponto-Caspian Region] (in Russian). Smolensk: Majenta. ISBN 5-98156-024-X.
