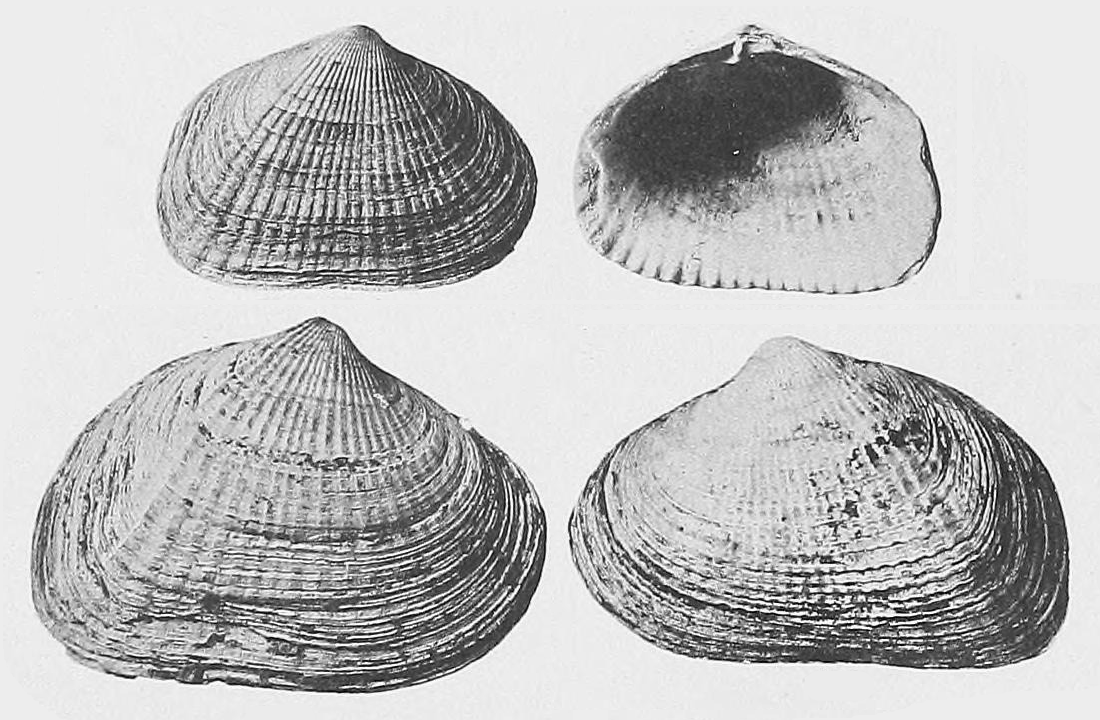

Scientific classification
- Kingdom: Animalia
- Phylum: Mollusca
- Class: Bivalvia
- Order: Cardiida
- Family: Cardiidae
- Genus: Didacna
- Species: D. protracta

Binomial name
- Didacna protracta (Eichwald, 1841)

Synonyms
- Didacna protracta var. grimmi Andrusov, 1910; Didacna protracta var. media Andrusov, 1910; Didacna protracta var. submedia Andrusov, 1910

= Didacna protracta =

Species of brackish-water bivalve

Didacna protracta is a brackish-water bivalve mollusc of the family Cardiidae, the cockles. It has a rounded-trapezoidal, thick, whitish shell, up to 42 mm (1.7 in) in length, with a small umbo and flattened ribs. The species is endemic to the Caspian Sea. It lives in the middle and southern parts of the sea at depths between 25 and 85 m (82–279 ft), rarely deeper.

== Description ==
Didacna protracta has a rounded-trapezoidal, thick, moderately convex shell, with a small umbo, 30–40 flattened radial ribs, dense growth lines on the ventral margin and a smooth posterior ridge, which is more distinct near the umbo. The shell length is up to 42 mm (1.7 in). The coloration is whitish, with thin pale yellowish gray periostracum. The hinge consists of one or two cardinal teeth in the right valve and one cardinal tooth in the left valve. The right valve sometimes has weakly developed lateral teeth.

=== Similar species ===
Didacna profundicola has a smaller shell, up to 15 mm (0.59 in) in length.

The fossil species Didacna catillus has a less equilateral and usually more convex shell, with a wider posterior slope and without the characteristic dense growth lines on the ventral margin.

== Distribution and ecology ==
Didacna protracta is endemic to the Caspian Sea. It lives in the middle and southern parts of the sea at depths between 25 and 85 m (82–279 ft), rarely deeper. The species does not occur in waters with salinity of less than 5‰.

== Fossil record ==
Didacna protracta is widespread in the Late Pleistocene (Lower Khvalynian) deposits of the northern Caspian Region. It is less common in the Upper Khvalynian sediments and is also present in the Holocene (Neocaspian) deposits of the Caspian Sea.

== Taxonomy ==
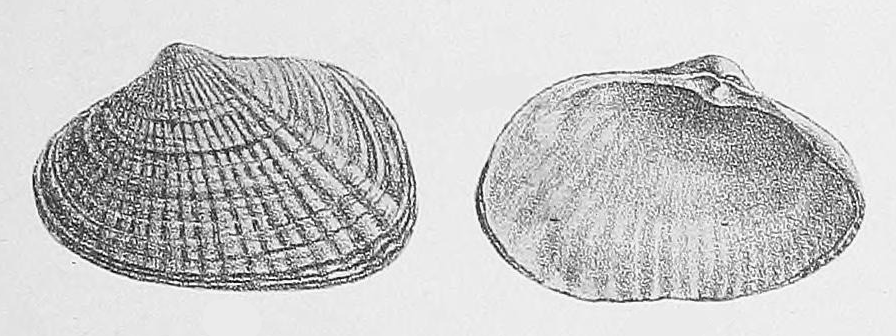
Illustrations of Adacna protracta from Eichwald's publication (1841)

The species was first described as Adacna protracta by Karl Eichwald in 1841 who found its fossilized shells in the surroundings of the Lake Elton (the type locality of the species) on the Caspian Lowland. One of Eichwald's specimens has been kept in the Geological Cabinet of the Saint Petersburg University, although the type series is considered lost. A single specimen from the Paleontological Institute of the Russian Academy of Sciences (PIN), collected from the Late Pleistocene (Lower Khvalynian) deposits near the Lake Elton, was designated as the neotype of this species by Lidiya Aleksandrovna Nevesskaja in 2007.

Earlier in 1829, Eichwald described the fossil species Cardium protractum. In 2013 Pavel Vladimirovich Kijashko regarded it as a senior synonym of A. protracta, changing the authorship of D. protracta to "Eichwald, 1829". However, the type locality of C. protractum, "Hab. calcem Poczaiowensem", likely corresponds to Staryi Pochaiv, which is situated in Western Ukraine. For this reason, C. protractum and A. protracta are not considered to be the same species.

Oscar Andreevich Grimm (1877) referred to his specimens of D. protracta and D. profundicola as Cardium catillus, a species described by Eichwald from fossil shells under the name Monodacna catillus. In 1910 Nicolai Ivanovich Andrusov have established that A. protracta is distinct from M. catillus and assigned both species to the genus Didacna. Additionally, he recognized eight varieties of D. protracta. In 1969 Boris Mikhailovich Logvinenko and Yaroslav Igorevich Starobogatov merged the varieties submedia, media and grimmi into the subspecies D. protracta submedia which was distinguished from the nominotypical subspecies (D. protracta protracta) by living in the deeper parts of the Caspian Sea and having slightly larger shells, with a straight or slightly concave ventral margin, smoother ribs and more pronounced growth lines. These subspecies were not recognized by Kijashko (2013) and the morphological differences between them were explained by allometric growth.

In 1966 Logvinenko and Starobogatov introduced the section Protodidacna which included D. protracta as its type species as well as D. profundicola. J. J. ter Poorten (2024) listed Protodidacna as a possible synonym of the genus Didacna.

Since the species was first described from fossil material, K. N. Glazunova (1971) gave the name D. protracta protracta to the Late Pleistocene specimens. The modern and Holocene specimens previously assigned to D. protracta protracta were redescribed by her as D. protracta novocaspica. This subspecies was distinguished from the Late Pleistocene D. protracta protracta by a less pronounced posterior slope. The type locality of D. protracta novocaspica is the eastern shelf of the Middle Caspian Sea near the Cape Peschanyy (Kazakhstan). The holotype is stored in PIN.

In a 2007 revision of the genus Didacna L. A. Nevesskaja recognized two newly described subspecies: the Late Pleistocene (Lower Khvalynian) D. protracta mangyschlakensis and the Holocene D. protracta raricostata. The former subspecies differs by a larger and less equilateral shell, while the latter has a lower apical angle of the umbo and less ribs. The holotypes of these taxa are stored in PIN. The name D. protracta mangyschlakensis is a homonym of the simultaneously published name Didacna subcrassa mangyschlakensis, while D. protracta raricostata is a junior homonym of Didacna raricostata.

== Cited texts ==
- Kijashko, P. V. (2013). "Mollyuski Kaspiyskogo morya" [Molluscs of the Caspian sea]. In Bogutskaya, N. G.; Kijashko, P. V.; Naseka, A. M.; Orlova, M. I. (eds.). Identification keys for fish and invertebrates of the Caspian Sea (in Russian). Vol. 1. Fish and molluscs. St. Petersburg; Moscow: KMK Scientific Press Ltd. pp. 298–392. ISBN 978-5-87317-932-9.
- ter Poorten, J. J. (2024). A taxonomic iconography of living Cardiidae. Harxheim: ConchBooks. ISBN 978-3-948603-48-9.
- Yanina, Т. А. (2005). Didakny Ponto-Kaspiya [Didacnas of the Ponto-Caspian Region] (in Russian). Smolensk: Majenta. ISBN 5-98156-024-X.
