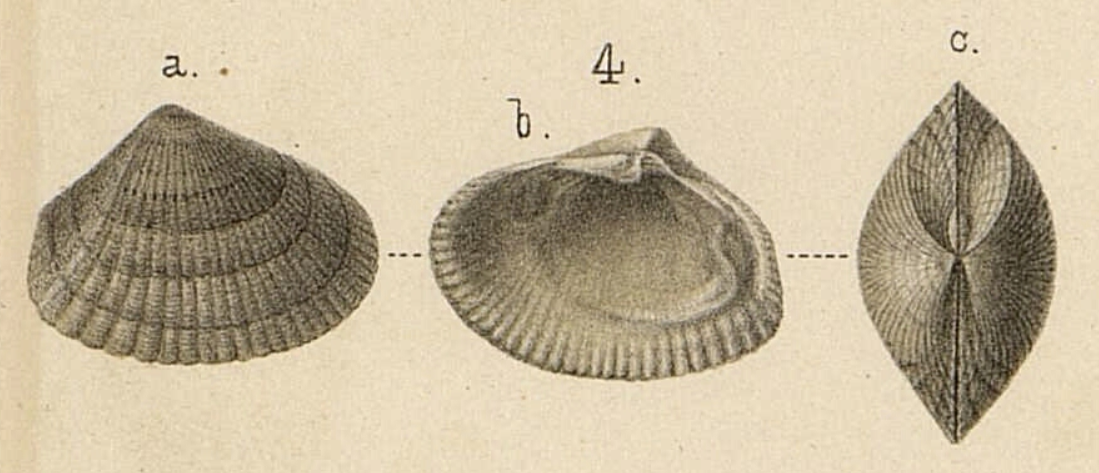
- Illustrations of Cardium longipes from Oscar Grimm's publication (1877)

Scientific classification
- Kingdom: Animalia
- Phylum: Mollusca
- Class: Bivalvia
- Order: Cardiida
- Family: Cardiidae
- Genus: Didacna
- Species: D. longipes

Binomial name
- Didacna longipes (Grimm, 1877)

= Didacna longipes =

Species of brackish-water bivalve

Didacna longipes is a brackish-water bivalve mollusc of the family Cardiidae, the cockles. It has an oval, thick, cream shell, up to 25 mm (0.98 in) in length, with a weakly protruding umbo and flattened ribs, which are often highlighted only by color. The species is endemic to the Caspian Sea. It lives in the Southern and Middle Caspian as well as in the south of the Northern Caspian at depths from 0 to 30 m (0 to 98 ft).

== Description ==
Didacna longipes has an oval, almost equilateral, thick, moderately convex shell, with a weakly protruding umbo, 26–33 flattened radial ribs, which are often highlighted only by color, and a distinct smooth or sharp posterior ridge, which often becomes almost invisible near the ventral margin. The shell length is up to 25 mm (0.98 in), the height is up to 23 mm (0.91 in), and the convexity is up to 16 mm (0.63 in). The external coloration is cream, the interior is white. The hinge consists of one cardinal tooth in both valves.

=== Similar species ===
Didacna baeri has a less equilateral, slightly thinner shell, with a smoother posterior ridge.

The juveniles of Didacna barbotdemarnii differ from those of D. longipes by having thinner shells, with less pronounced growth lines, less ribs, a somewhat wider umbo, sharper posterior ridge, narrower anterior margin and a more elongated posterior margin.

== Distribution and ecology ==
Didacna longipes is endemic to the Caspian Sea. It lives in the Southern and Middle Caspian as well as in the south of the Northern Caspian at depths from 0 to 30 m (0 to 98 ft). It avoids areas with salinity of less than 10‰ and often co-occurs with D. barbotdemarnii.

D. longipes first appeared in the Caspian Sea during the Holocene.

== Taxonomy ==
The species was first described as Cardium longipes by Russian zoologist Oscar Andreevich Grimm in 1877. The type locality is in the Caspian Sea off Azerbaijan (40°39'N, 50°16'E) at a depth of 11 m (36 ft). The specimens collected by Grimm from this locality are kept in the Zoological Institute of the Russian Academy of Sciences (ZIN) and one of them has been designated as the lectotype of D. longipes by Boris Mikhailovich Logvinenko and Yaroslav Igorevich Starobogatov in 1967.

The taxonomic status of D. longipes was uncertain in the past. For instance, it has been proposed that the species could be a "deformed form" of D. baeri. In 1967 Logvinenko and Starobogatov have established that D. longipes is a distinct and valid species, but also noted that Grimm's specimens from ZIN differ somewhat from the original illustrations of the species.

In a 2007 revision of the genus Didacna Lidiya Aleksandrovna Nevesskaja have stated that D. longipes cannot be clearly identified from the existing descriptions and described the new species, Didacna carinata, without explicitly treating D. longipes as its synonym. According to the description D. carinata is similar to D. barbotdemarnii and differs by a more pronounced posterior ridge, more protruding umbo, more convex shell and less developed cardinal teeth. The holotype of D. carinata is stored in the Paleontological Institute of the Russian Academy of Sciences. In 2013 Pavel Vladimirovich Kijashko have concluded that D. longipes is a valid species, while the taxonomic status of D. carinata is uncertain and it has been treated as a possible synonym of both D. longipes and D. barbotdemarnii.

== Cited texts ==
- Kijashko, P. V. (2013). "Mollyuski Kaspiyskogo morya" [Molluscs of the Caspian sea]. In Bogutskaya, N. G.; Kijashko, P. V.; Naseka, A. M.; Orlova, M. I. (eds.). Identification keys for fish and invertebrates of the Caspian Sea (in Russian). Vol. 1. Fish and molluscs. St. Petersburg; Moscow: KMK Scientific Press Ltd. pp. 298–392. ISBN 978-5-87317-932-9.
- Logvinenko, B. M.; Starobogatov, Y. I. (1969). "Tip Mollyuski. Mollusca" [Phylum Molluscs. Mollusca]. In Birshteyn, Y. A.; Vinogradov, L. G.; Kondakov, N. N.; Kuhn, M. S.; Astakhova, T. V.; Romanova, N. N. (eds.). Atlas bespozvonochnykh Kaspiyskogo morya [Atlas of the Invertebrates of the Caspian Sea] (in Russian). Moscow: Pishchevaya Promyshlennost. pp. 308–385.
- ter Poorten, J. J. (2024). A taxonomic iconography of living Cardiidae. Harxheim: ConchBooks. ISBN 978-3-948603-48-9.
