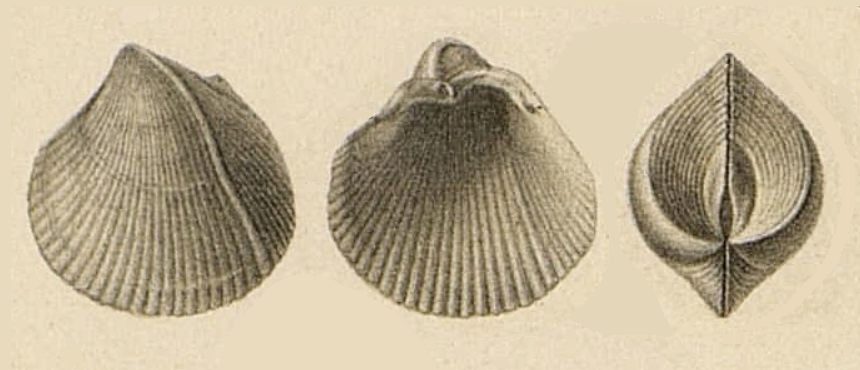
- Illustrations of Cardium pyramidatum from Oscar Grimm's publication (1877)

Scientific classification
- Kingdom: Animalia
- Phylum: Mollusca
- Class: Bivalvia
- Order: Cardiida
- Family: Cardiidae
- Genus: Didacna
- Species: D. pyramidata

Binomial name
- Didacna pyramidata (Grimm, 1877)

= Didacna pyramidata =

Species of brackish-water bivalve

Didacna pyramidata is a brackish-water bivalve mollusc of the family Cardiidae, the cockles. It has a high rounded-triangular, thick, cream shell, up to 30–45 mm (1.2–1.8 in) in length, with flattened ribs. The species is endemic to the Caspian Sea. It lives in the Southern Caspian and in the southern part of the Middle Caspian at depths between 30 and 100 m (98–328 ft), rarely down to 130 m (430 ft).

== Description ==
Didacna pyramidata has a high rounded-triangular, thick, convex shell, with about 28–38 flattened radial ribs and a distinct posterior ridge which is sometimes marked by a stronger developed rib. The shell length is up to 30–45 mm (1.2–1.8 in). The external coloration is cream, with thin brownish periostracum. The interior is whitish, with a yellow-brown stain on the posterior margin. The hinge consists of two cardinal teeth in the right valve and one cardinal tooth in the left valve. The right valve sometimes has weakly developed lateral teeth.

=== Similar species ===
Didacna trigonoides has a more inflated shell, with a stronger protruding umbo, less ribs and a weaker posterior lateral tooth in the right valve.

The fossil species Didacna subpyramidata has fewer ribs, a less distinct posterior ridge, higher umbo and its shell is usually more convex.

Didacna praetrigonoides is a possibly extinct species mostly known from the Late Pleistocene deposits of the Caspian Sea and the shells of which sometimes wash ashore. Compared to D. pyramidata it has a more elongated and convex shell, with a more protruding umbo.

== Distribution and ecology ==
Didacna pyramidata is endemic to the Caspian Sea. It lives in the Southern Caspian and in the southern part of the Middle Caspian at depths between 30 and 100 m (98–328 ft), rarely down to 130 m (430 ft). It does not occur in waters with salinity of less than 10–12‰.

== Fossil record ==
Didacna pyramidata occurs in the Holocene deposits of the middle and southern parts of the Caspian Sea. Nevesskaja (2007) hypothesized that the species descended from the Late Pleistocene D. praetrigonoides.

== Taxonomy ==
The species was first described as Cardium pyramidatum by Oscar Andreevich Grimm in 1877 from live individuals which were found in the southern part of the Caspian Sea off Azerbaijan at depths of 42–130 m (140–430 ft). These specimens are now stored in the Zoological Institute of the Russian Academy of Sciences and the one collected at a depth of 64 m (210 ft) has been designated as the lectotype of D. pyramidata by Logvinenko and Starobogatov (1967). The coordinates of the type locality are 39°47'N 49°59'30"E.

== Cited texts ==
- Kijashko, P. V. (2013). "Mollyuski Kaspiyskogo morya" [Molluscs of the Caspian sea]. In Bogutskaya, N. G.; Kijashko, P. V.; Naseka, A. M.; Orlova, M. I. (eds.). Identification keys for fish and invertebrates of the Caspian Sea (in Russian). Vol. 1. Fish and molluscs. St. Petersburg; Moscow: KMK Scientific Press Ltd. pp. 298–392. ISBN 978-5-87317-932-9.
