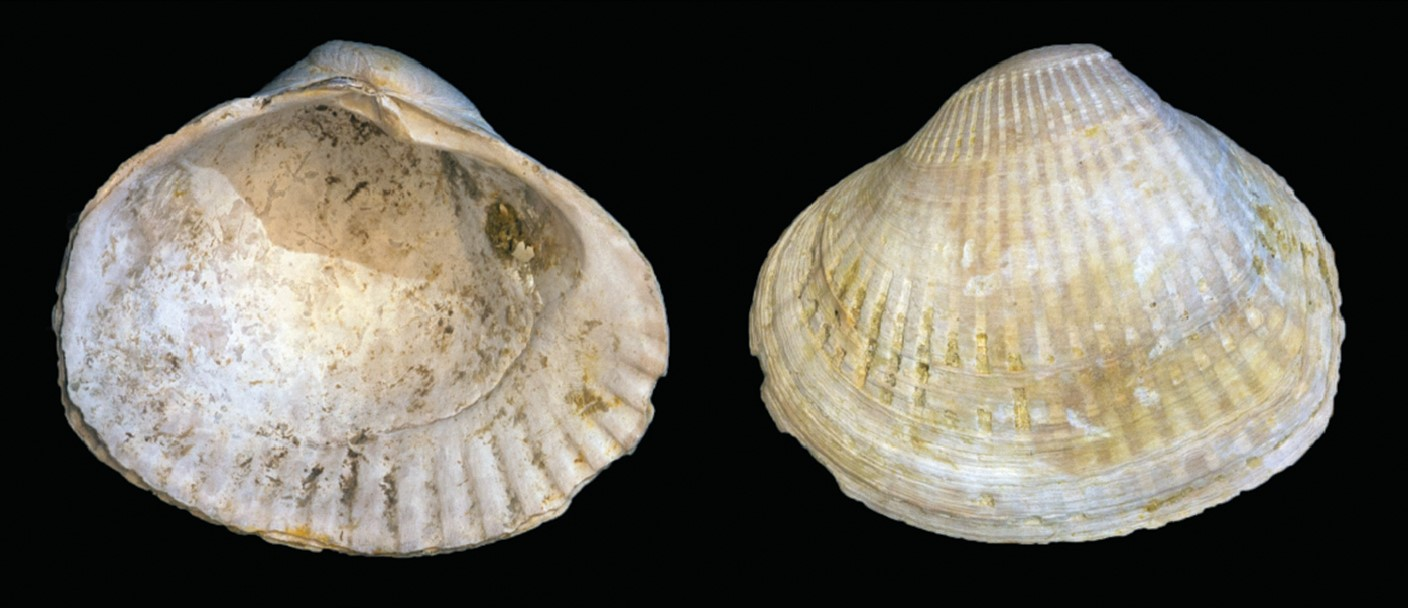
- Shell from the Holocene deposits of the Caspian Sea (Dagestan, Russia)

Scientific classification
- Kingdom: Animalia
- Phylum: Mollusca
- Class: Bivalvia
- Order: Cardiida
- Family: Cardiidae
- Genus: Didacna
- Species: D. baeri

Binomial name
- Didacna baeri (Grimm, 1877)

Synonyms
- Didacna alibajramliensis Gadzhiev, 1966

= Didacna baeri =

Species of brackish-water bivalve

Didacna baeri is a brackish-water bivalve mollusc of the family Cardiidae, the cockles. It has a broadly-oval or oval-triangular, thick, whitish or cream shell, up to 40–50 mm (1.6–2.0 in) in length, with flattened brown ribs. The species is endemic to the Caspian Sea. It lives in the middle and southern parts of the sea at depths from 0 to 60 m (0 to 200 ft) and does not occur in desalinated areas. It is named after Baltic German scientist Karl Ernst von Baer.

== Description ==
Didacna baeri has a broadly-oval or oval-triangular, thick, convex shell, with a weakly or moderately protruding umbo, 23–35 flattened radial ribs, which are often brown, and a distinct smooth posterior ridge. The shell length is up to 40–50 mm (1.6–2.0 in). The external coloration is whitish or cream, with thin pale yellowish green periostracum. The interior is white, often with a brown stain on the posterior margin. The hinge consists of one or two cardinal teeth in the right valve and one cardinal tooth in the left valve. The juveniles have weakly developed lateral teeth.

=== Similar species ===
Didacna eichwaldi has a more protruding umbo and a sharp posterior ridge in juveniles (sharp only around the umbo in adults).

Didacna longipes has a more equilateral, slightly thicker shell, with a sharper posterior ridge.

Several fossil species are similar to D. baeri. Didacna surachanica usually has a lower and wider umbo. Didacna subcatillus differs by a less inflated shell with a higher apical angle of the umbo. The shell of Didacna ovatocrassa is typically less elongated and less convex.

== Distribution and ecology ==
Didacna baeri is endemic to the Caspian Sea. It lives in the middle and southern parts of the sea at depths from 0 to 50 m (0 to 160 ft), rarely down to 60 m (200 ft). The species does not occur in desalinated areas.

The mantle cavity of D. baeri can be inhabited by the amphipod crustacean Cardiophilus baeri.

== Fossil record ==
Didacna baeri is widespread in the Holocene (Neocaspian) deposits on the coasts of the middle and southern parts of the Caspian Sea and rarely occurs in the Late Pleistocene (Upper Khvalynian) beds of its western coast. Nevesskaja (2007) hypothesized that the species descended from the Late Pleistocene (Lower Khvalynian) D. subcatillus.

== Taxonomy ==
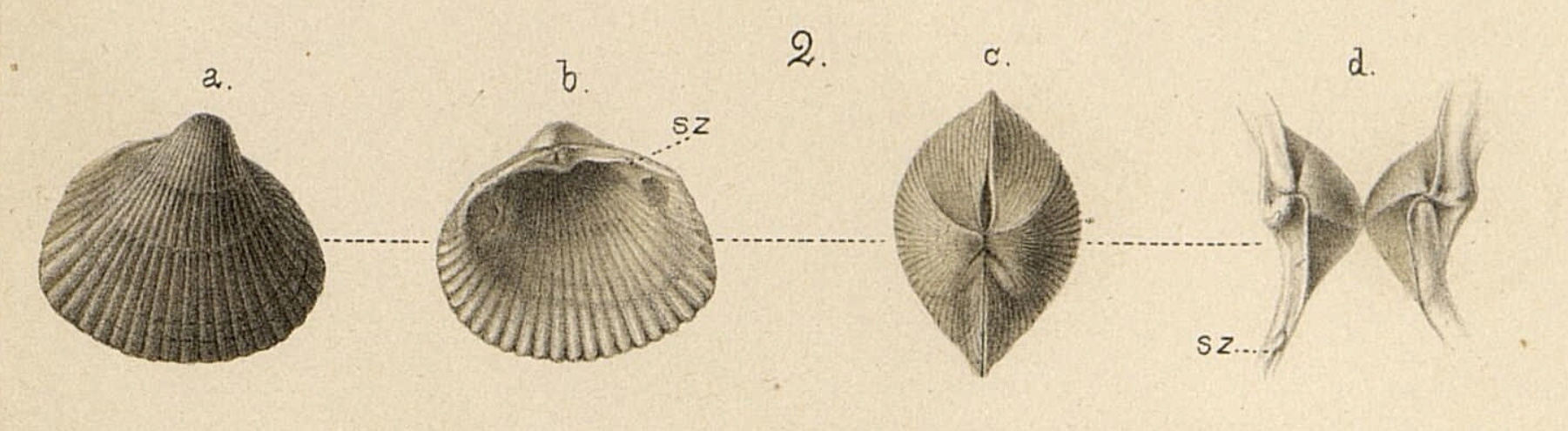

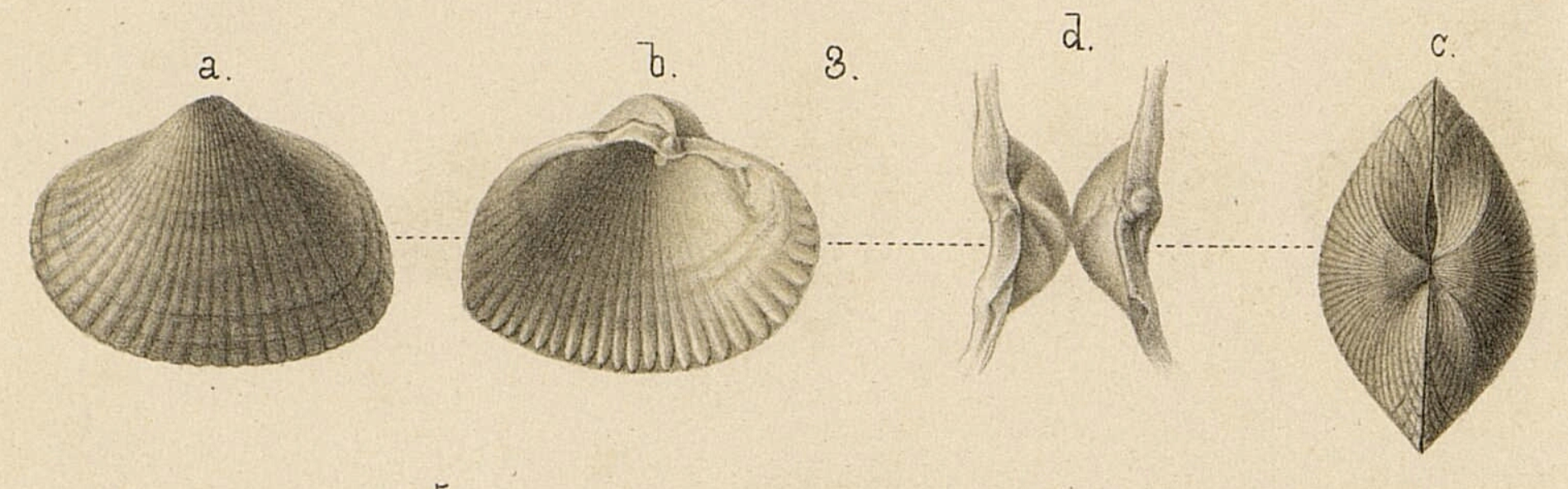
Illustrations of Cardium baeri from Grimm's publication (1877)

The species was first described as Cardium Baeri by Oscar Andreevich Grimm in 1877. He named it after Baltic German scientist Karl Ernst von Baer. The type locality of D. baeri is in the Caspian Sea off Turkmenistan (40°32'N, 52°23'E) at a depth of 37 m (121 ft). Here, Grimm observed several hundred living individuals of this bivalve. One of the specimens collected by him from the type locality is now kept in the Zoological Institute of the Russian Academy of Sciences and has been designated as the lectotype of the species by Logvinenko and Starobogatov (1967).

Logvinenko and Starobogatov (1969) treated Didacna eichwaldi as a junior synonym of D. baeri. This synonymy was followed in catalogues of extant molluscs of Russia and by Kijashko (2013), but was not accepted by some other authors such as Yanina (2005) and Nevesskaja (2007). Wesselingh et al. (2019) and subsequent authors treated these species as distinct due to differences in shell characteristics.

Pravoslavlev (1939) described the variety transmittens from the Pleistocene deposits of the Lake Baskunchak and the Lower Volga near Chyorny Yar, Solyonoye Zaymishche and other places. Svitoch (1967) treated it as a synonym of Didacna subpyramidata. Nevesskaja (2007) listed Pravoslavlev's record of D. baeri in the synonymy of Didacna delenda.

Gadzhiev (1968) described shells of D. baeri with a stronger protruding umbo from the Holocene deposits of the Baku Archipelago and Xanlar Island as the variety alata. Yanina (2005) did not differentiate this variety from the "typical" D. baeri due to the presence of intermediate forms. Additionally, the name of this taxon is invalid since it was introduced as variety after 1960. If the name becomes available it would be a junior homonym of Didacna alata.

Didacna alibajramliensis is an extinct species described by Gadzhiev (1966) from Azerbaijan. Nevesskaja (2007) regarded it as a possible synonym of D. baeri.

== Cited texts ==
- Kijashko, P. V. (2013). "Mollyuski Kaspiyskogo morya" [Molluscs of the Caspian sea]. In Bogutskaya, N. G.; Kijashko, P. V.; Naseka, A. M.; Orlova, M. I. (eds.). Identification keys for fish and invertebrates of the Caspian Sea (in Russian). Vol. 1. Fish and molluscs. St. Petersburg; Moscow: KMK Scientific Press Ltd. pp. 298–392. ISBN 978-5-87317-932-9.
- ter Poorten, J. J. (2024). A taxonomic iconography of living Cardiidae. Harxheim: ConchBooks. ISBN 978-3-948603-48-9.
- Yanina, Т. А. (2005). Didakny Ponto-Kaspiya [Didacnas of the Ponto-Caspian Region] (in Russian). Smolensk: Majenta. ISBN 5-98156-024-X.
