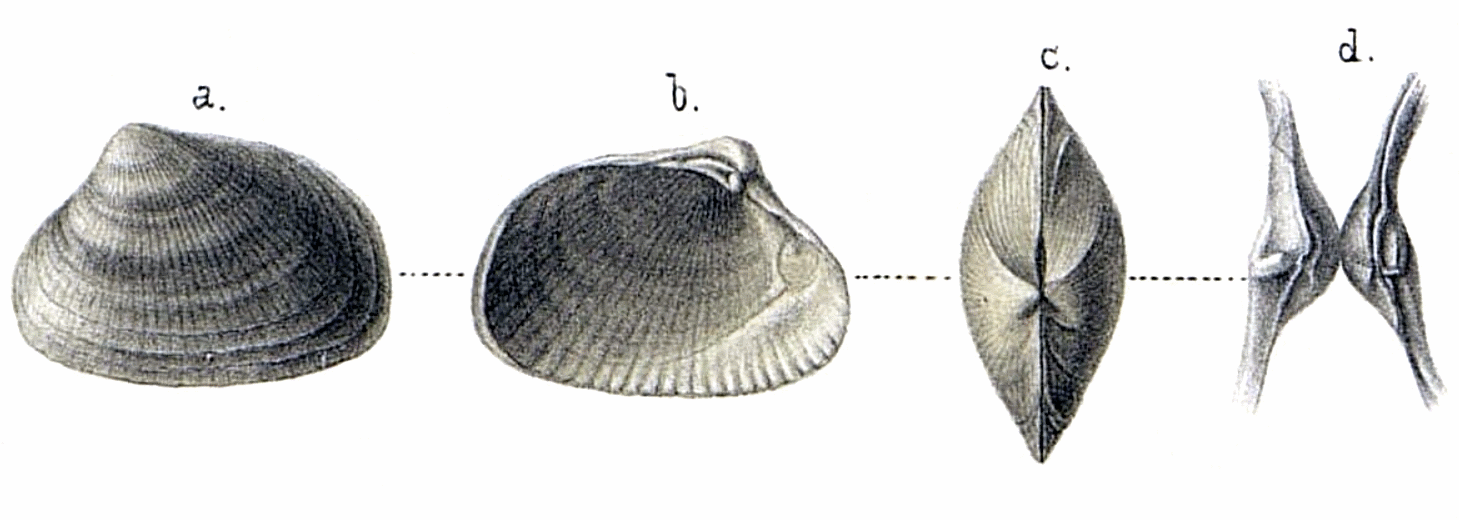
- Illustrations of a specimen initially identified as Cardium catillus and now attributed to D. profundicola (1887)

Scientific classification
- Kingdom: Animalia
- Phylum: Mollusca
- Class: Bivalvia
- Order: Cardiida
- Family: Cardiidae
- Genus: Didacna
- Species: D. profundicola

Binomial name
- Didacna profundicola Logvinenko & Starobogatov, 1966

= Didacna profundicola =

Species of brackish-water bivalve

Didacna profundicola is a brackish-water bivalve mollusc of the family Cardiidae, the cockles. It has a trapezoidal, thin, white or pink-white shell, up to 10–15 mm (0.39–0.59 in) in length, with flattened ribs. The species is the deepest-dwelling bivalve of the Caspian Sea. It lives in the middle and southern parts of the sea at depths between 75 and 475 m (246–1,558 ft).

== Description ==
Didacna profundicola has a trapezoidal, thin, moderately convex shell, with a narrower anterior margin, 25–38 flattened radial ribs and a distinct rounded posterior ridge. The shell length is up to 10–15 mm (0.39–0.59 in), the height is up to 7–9 mm (0.28–0.35 in), and the convexity is up to 7 mm (0.28 in). The coloration is white or pink-white, with thin yellow-grey periostracum. The hinge consists of one cardinal tooth in both valves. The cardinal tooth of the left valve is distinctly curved towards the anterior margin.

== Distribution and ecology ==
Didacna profundicola is the deepest-dwelling bivalve of the Caspian Sea. It lives in the middle and southern parts of the sea at depths between 75 and 475 m (246–1,558 ft). The species may presumably reach a depth of around 500 m (1,600 ft) or even 700 m (2,300 ft).

The species is only known from the modern (Holocene) fauna.

== Taxonomy ==
Didacna profundicola was described by Boris Mikhailovich Logvinenko and Yaroslav Igorevich Starobogatov in 1966. Together with Didacna protracta the species has been placed in the new section Protodidacna which is now considered to be a possible synonym of the genus Didacna. The type locality of D. profundicola is in the central part of the Caspian Sea off Turkmenistan (39°38'N, 52°02'E) at a depth of 94 m (308 ft). The holotype is kept in the Zoological Institute of the Russian Academy of Sciences.

The specimens described by Oscar Andreevich Grimm in 1877 under the name Cardium catillus are now attributed to D. protracta and D. profundicola.

== Cited texts ==
- ter Poorten, J. J. (2024). A taxonomic iconography of living Cardiidae. Harxheim: ConchBooks. ISBN 978-3-948603-48-9.
