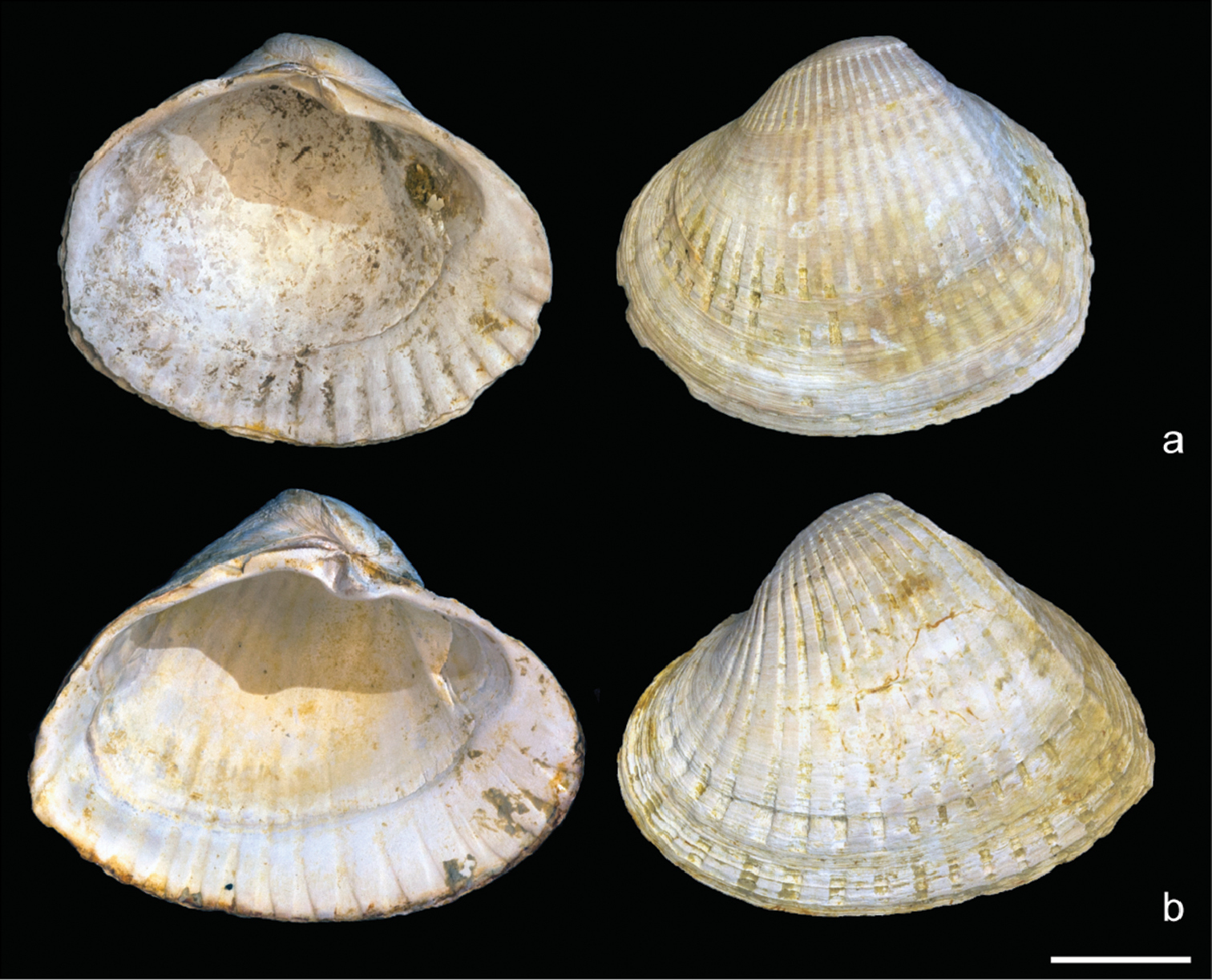
- Shells of Didacna baeri (a) and Didacna eichwaldi (b) from the Holocene deposits of the Caspian Sea

Scientific classification
- Kingdom: Animalia
- Phylum: Mollusca
- Class: Bivalvia
- Order: Cardiida
- Family: Cardiidae
- Tribe: Adacnini
- Genus: Didacna; Eichwald, 1838

Type species
- Cardium trigonoides Pallas, 1771

= Didacna =

Genus of bivalves

Didacna is a genus of brackish-water bivalve molluscs of the cockle family (Cardiidae) characterized by rounded-triangular, oval or trapezoidal shells with flattened ribs. It includes about 90 accepted species, 9 of which are extant and endemic to the Caspian Sea. The genus presumably originated in the Black Sea and the Caspian Sea basins during the Pleistocene around 900,000 years ago. However, several fossil species from older deposits outside of those basins have also sometimes been classified within this genus. These cockles are sedentary filter feeders that bury into the sediment and feed on suspended detritus, microscopic algae and mollusc larvae. They are a food source for some fish species.

== Description ==
Members of the genus Didacna have solid rounded-triangular, oval or trapezoidal shells, with flattened radial ribs on the exterior and grooves corresponding to the ribs on the interior. A distinct posterior ridge is present and is sometimes marked by a stronger developed rib. The pallial line is continuous and there is no pallial sinus. The hinge of each valve has two cardinal teeth, one of which may be reduced. The lateral teeth are poorly developed or absent.

The foot of these cockles is bent angularly. Their siphons are short and immobile, with small papillae on the margins.

=== Differences from other genera ===
Species of the genus Monodacna differ from Didacna by the presence of the pallial sinus and less distinct posterior ridge. The fossil Didacnoides and Turcmena also have a pallial sinus and their ribs are more convex. Members of another extinct genus, Pontalmyra, have more convex ribs and more developed lateral teeth compared to Didacna.

== Distribution ==
All extant Didacna species are endemic to the Caspian Sea and most of them only inhabit its middle and southern parts. Didacna barbotdemarnii and Didacna longipes also occur in the southern portion of the Northern Caspian while Didacna trigonoides is distributed throughout all parts of the sea.

== Ecology ==
The cockles of this genus are sedentary filter feeders that live on sandy, shelly and mixed hard substrates at depths from 0 to over 70 m in waters with salinity of 3–14‰. Only D. trigonoides tolerates salinity levels of less than 5‰. Didacna profundicola which has been recorded at depths of 75–475 m is considered to be the deepest-dwelling bivalve of the Caspian Sea.

The juveniles of D. trigonoides fully bury into the sediment while the adults only burrow halfway through. In this position their siphons are always pointed upwards and they feed on suspended detritus, microscopic algae and mollusc larvae.

Didacna often live together with other bivalves such as the lagoon cockle (Cerastoderma glaucum), mussels of the genus Dreissena and the invasive Mytilaster lineatus.

The predators of Didacna cockles include the Caspian roach (Rutilus caspicus), common bream (Abramis brama), gobies and sturgeons.

== Evolution ==
Members of the genus Didacna are thought to have originated in the Pontocaspian region in the Black Sea and the Caspian Sea basins during the Pleistocene around 900,000 years ago. However, several species from the Late Miocene deposits of Italy, the Pliocene of Spain, the late Early-Middle Pleistocene of Greece and Early Pleistocene of south-west Turkey have also been included in this genus by some authors. In Turkey the layer containing Didacna shells have been dated to 1.8 million years ago.

In the Pontocaspian region fossilized Didacna shells occur in deposits of all coasts of the Azov-Black Sea basin, the Caspian Sea basin and the Manych Depression where in the past a strait has repeatedly formed and connected the two basins. In the Caspian basin these cockles went through a rapid diversification which has not been observed in other Caspian bivalves. In the Black Sea basin the genus was less diverse although it not only had its own local species, but also the species of the Caspian origin which migrated there through the Manych strait. By the end of the Late Pleistocene the Black Sea species went extinct due to the influx of Mediterranean waters. The modern group of the Caspian Sea Didacna species was formed in the Holocene.

The origin of the Pontocaspian species of this genus is uncertain. It has been proposed that they first evolved in the Black Sea basin and later migrated into the Caspian Sea. In this case Didacna could be related to the extinct Tschaudia which possibly descended from the Late Miocene Pseudocatillus. Another scenario suggests that Didacna originated in the Caspian Basin and have evolved from the extinct Didacnoides. The genus could also be polyphyletic, including species of both Black Sea and Caspian origin. The relationship between Pontocaspian and Turkish species has not been resolved and their similarities could be a result of convergence.

== Uses ==
Fossilized shells of Didacna are used in stratigraphy. All of the transgressive and regressive stages of the Caspian Sea were characterized by different groups of Didacna species. In the Black Sea region they are index fossils of the brackish-water Chaudian and Eoeuxinian-Uzunlarian basins that existed during the Early-Middle Pleistocene.

== Threats ==
Since the 20th century the Caspian Sea molluscs including members of the genus Didacna have been threatened by invasive species. In many coastal areas the communities of endemic Caspian molluscs have been replaced by the Black Sea bivalves including the Holocene immigrant Cerastoderma glaucum as well as Abra segmentum and Mytilaster lineatus which were introduced to the sea in the 20th century. Other non-native species including the barnacle Amphibalanus improvisus and the bryozoan Conopeum seurati can attach and form colonies on shells of living Didacna individuals which may have negative effects on these bivalves. Another threat for the Caspian molluscs is the pollution of the sea with oil products, pesticides and heavy metals.

== Taxonomy ==
The genus Didacna was established by Karl Eichwald in 1838. Initially it included two species which were earlier described as Cardium trigonoides and C. crassum (now known as D. trigonoides and D. eichwaldi respectively). Stoliczka (1870) designated D. trigonoides as the type species.

Molecular studies of D. trigonoides and Monodacna colorata have shown that the genera Didacna and Monodacna form a monophyletic group, the subfamily Lymnocardiinae.

MolluscaBase lists 91 accepted Didacna species. Nine extant species are recognized:

- Didacna baeri (Grimm, 1877)
- Didacna barbotdemarnii (Grimm, 1877)
- Didacna eichwaldi (Krynicki, 1837)
- Didacna longipes (Grimm, 1877)
- Didacna parallella Bogachev, 1932
- Didacna profundicola Logvinenko & Starobogatov, 1966
- Didacna protracta (Eichwald, 1841)
- Didacna pyramidata (Grimm, 1877)
- Didacna trigonoides (Pallas, 1771)

== Cited texts ==
- Kijashko, P. V. (2013). "Mollyuski Kaspiyskogo morya" [Molluscs of the Caspian sea]. In Bogutskaya, N. G.; Kijashko, P. V.; Naseka, A. M.; Orlova, M. I. (eds.). Identification keys for fish and invertebrates of the Caspian Sea (in Russian). Vol. 1. Fish and molluscs. St. Petersburg; Moscow: KMK Scientific Press Ltd. pp. 298–392. ISBN 978-5-87317-932-9.
- Yanina, Т. А. (2005). Didakny Ponto-Kaspiya [Didacnas of the Ponto-Caspian Region] (in Russian). Smolensk: Majenta. ISBN 5-98156-024-X.
