= Beak (bivalve) =

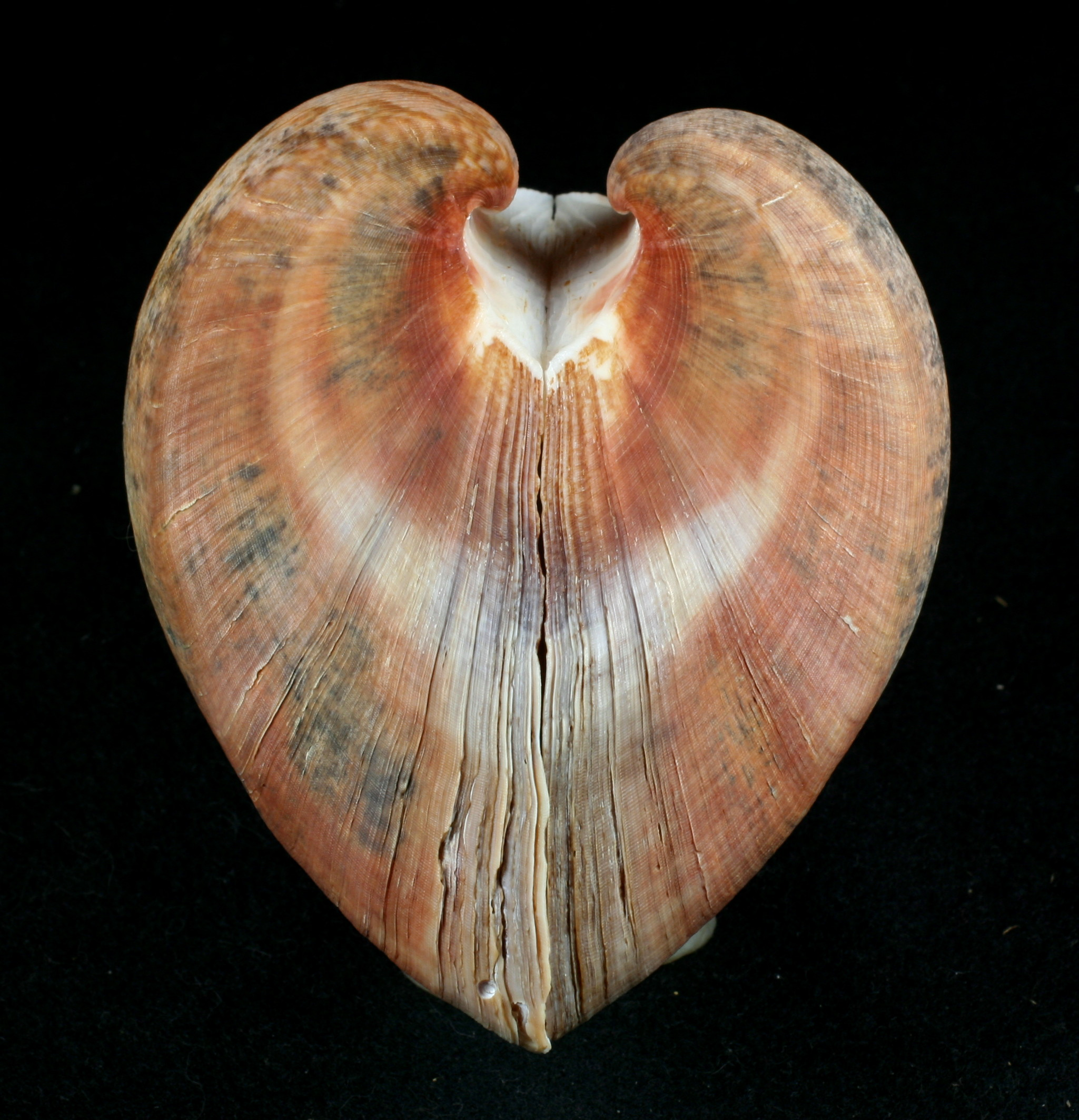
A side view of a whole shell of Cucullaea labiata (Lightfoot, 1786). In this species the beaks face one another across the hinge line.

The beak is part of the shell of a bivalve mollusk, i.e. part of the shell of a saltwater or freshwater clam. The beak is the basal projection of the oldest part of the valve of the adult animal. The beak usually, but not always, coincides with the umbo, the highest and most prominent point on the valve. Because by definition, all bivalves have two valves, the shell of a bivalve has two umbones, and two beaks.

In many species of bivalves the beaks point towards one another. However, in some species of bivalves the beaks point posteriorly, in which case they are referred to as opisthogyrate; in others the beaks point forward, and are described as being prosogyrate.

If the beak is not eroded or worn down at all, it may still be capped with the prodissoconch, which is the larval shell of the animal.
