= Adductor muscles (bivalve) =

Main muscular system in bivalves

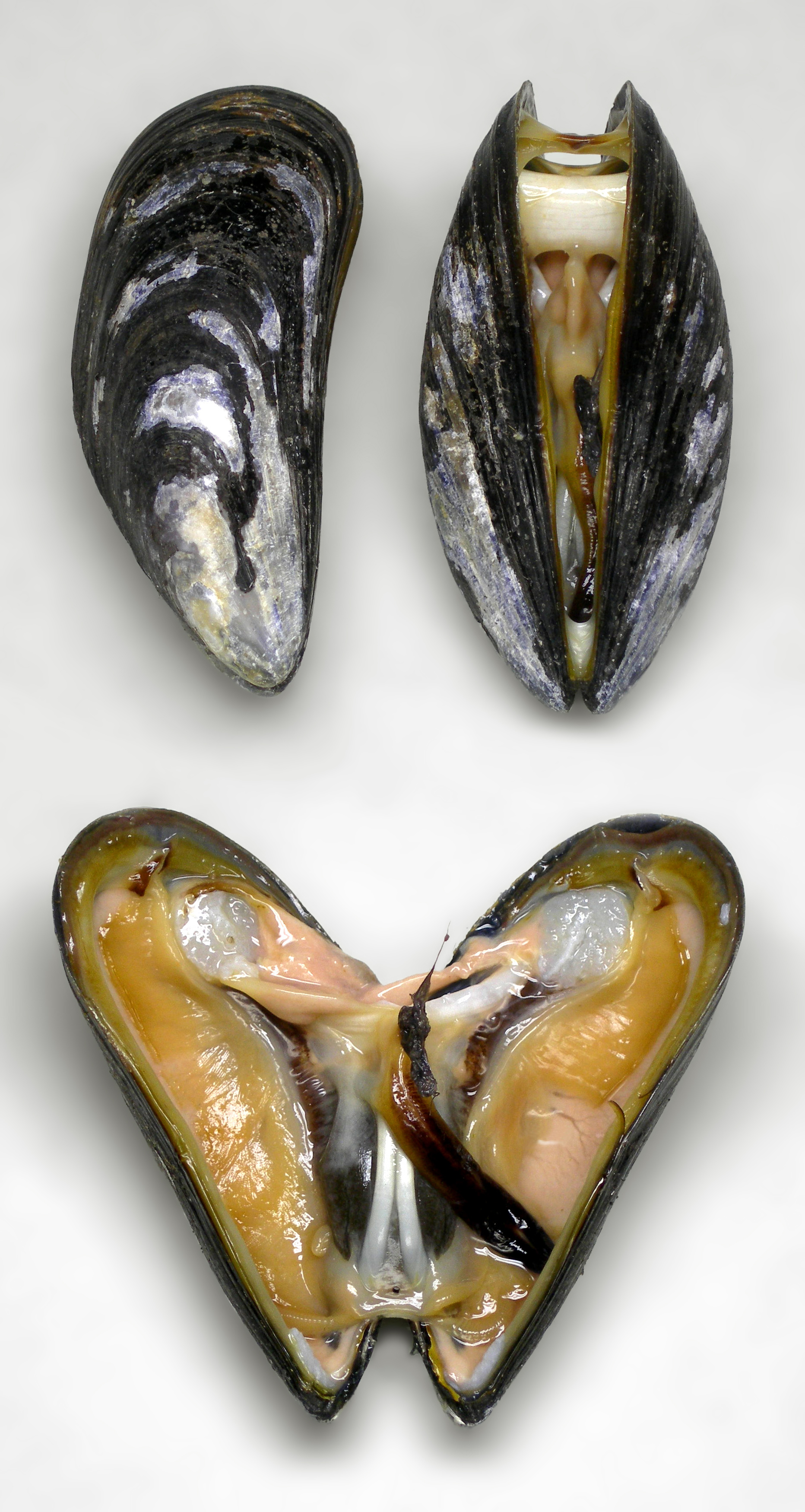
Marine blue mussel, Mytilus edulis, showing some of the inner anatomy, including the white posterior adductor muscle which is visible in the upper image, and has been cut in the lower image to allow the valves to open fully.

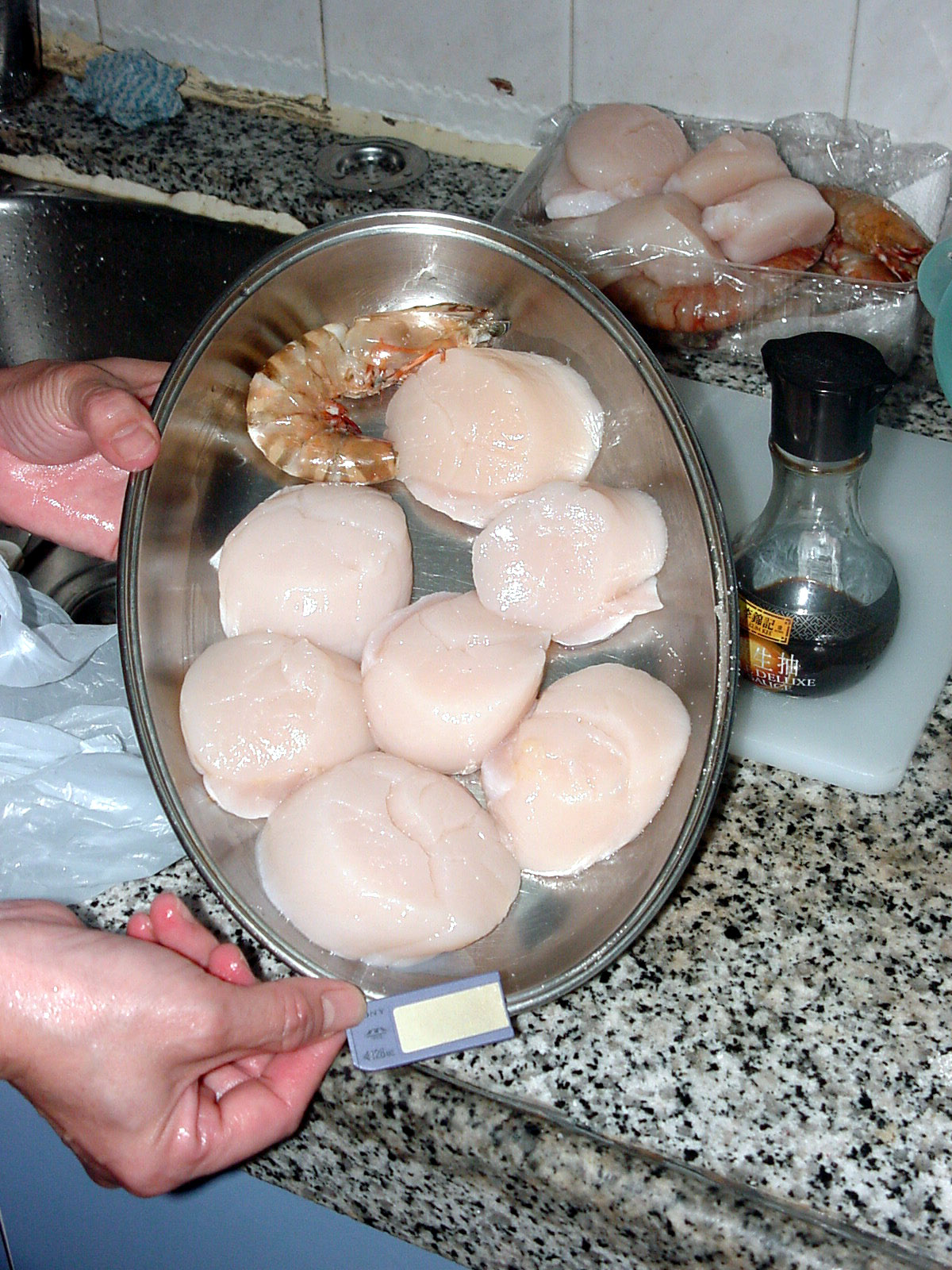
One shrimp and large adductor muscles from seven individuals of the giant scallop which are about to be cooked

The adductor muscles are the main muscular system in bivalve mollusks (e.g. in clams, scallops, mussels, oysters, etc.). In many parts of the world, when people eat scallops, the adductor muscles are the only part of the animal which is eaten. Adductor muscles leave noticeable scars or marks on the interior of the shell's valves. Those marks (known as adductor muscle scars) are often used by scientists who are in the process of identifying empty shells to determine their correct taxonomic placement.

Bivalve mollusks generally have either one or two adductor muscles. The muscles are strong enough to close the valves of the shell when they contract, and they are what enable the animal to close its valves tightly when necessary, such as when the bivalve is exposed to the air by low water levels, or when it is attacked by a predator. Most bivalve species have two adductor muscles, which are located on the anterior and posterior sides of the body. Some families of bivalves have only one adductor muscle, or rarely even three adductor muscles.

When the adductor muscles relax, the valves of the shell are automatically pulled open to some extent by a ligament, which joins the valves together and which is usually located on the hinge line between the umbos of the shell. The resiliency of the ligament is what causes the valves of the bivalve mollusk to open when the adductor muscles relax.

Scallops and file clams can swim by opening and closing their valves rapidly by alternatingly contracting and relaxing their adductor muscles; water is ejected on either side of the hinge area and they move with the flapping valves in front.
