= Aspein =

Aspein is an unusually acidic bivalve shell matrix protein, which may have important roles in calcium carbonate biomineralization. The Aspein gene (aspein, Uniprot: Q76K52) encodes a sequence of 413 amino acids, including a high proportion of Asp (60.4%), Gly (16.0%), and Ser (13.2%), and the predicted isoelectric point is 1.78. This is the most acidic of all the molluscan shell matrix proteins sequenced so far, or probably even of all known proteins on earth. The main body of aspein is occupied by (Asp)2–10 sequences punctuated with Ser–Gly dipeptides. RT-PCR demonstrated that the transcript of aspein is expressed at the outer edge of the mantle, corresponding to the calcitic prismatic layer, but not at the inner part of the mantle, corresponding to the aragonitic nacreous layer. Aspein is likely responsible for directed formation of calcite in the shell of the pearl oyster Pinctada fucata.
