= Vladimir Vladimirovich Bogachev =

Soviet geologist and palaeontologist

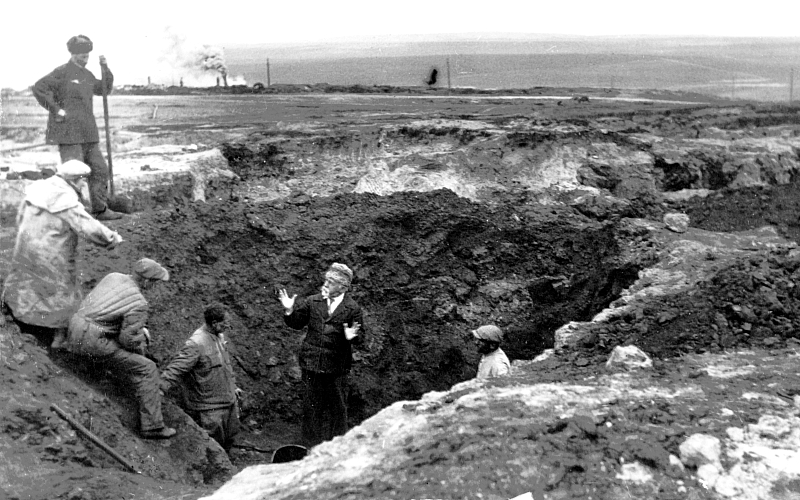
- Known for: geology and paleontology works
- Scientific career
- Fields: geology, paleontology, geography, history, soil science
- Institutions: Yuryev University, Don Polytechnic Institute, Azerbaijan Technical University, Baku State University, Rostov State University

Vladimir Vladimirovich Bogachev (February 7 [19], 1881, Novocherkassk – December 11, 1965, Baku) was a Russian and Soviet geologist and paleontologist, Doctor of Geological and Mineralogical Sciences (1937), professor, and Honored Scientist of the Azerbaijan SSR (1936).

== Biography ==
Born 19 February 1881 in Novocherkassk into the family of mining engineer Vladimir Fyodorovich Bogachev (1848 – 7 September 1919, Novocherkassk). He was the eldest of seven children.

He studied at the Novocherkassk Men's Gymnasium. He engaged in painting, and his works were exhibited by the Imperial Academy of Arts in 1900 at the Paris World's Fair.

In 1900, he enrolled at Kharkiv University's medical faculty but transferred in 1901 to Saint Petersburg Imperial University's physics and mathematics faculty, graduating in 1905. During his university years, he published 14 scientific papers.

From 1905 to 1911, he taught natural history at the Novocherkassk Gymnasium and worked as a specialist in hydrogeology and soil science for the regional agronomist of the Don Host Oblast.

From 1907, he was an assistant in the geology department at Yuryev University, and in 1910, he became a Privatdozent there.

In 1912, he moved to Tiflis but continued lecturing at Yuryev University. In Tiflis, he worked as a geologist for the Caucasian Mining District and as a professor at higher women's courses.

In 1917, he returned to Novocherkassk, where he served as a docent at the Don Polytechnic Institute, becoming a professor in 1920. Without defending a doctoral dissertation, he was awarded the degree of Doctor of Geological and Mineralogical Sciences in 1937.

From 1921, he was a professor at the Azerbaijan Polytechnic Institute and Azerbaijan University.

Starting in 1925, he conducted paleontological excavations and research at the Binagadi asphalt lake.

In 1940, he became head of the General Geology Department at Rostov State University following the sudden death of Professor N. A. Grigorovich-Berezovsky.

During the German occupation, he was in Rostov-on-Don, continuing to teach at Rostov University and participating in the reorganization of the Museum of the History of Don Cossacks in Novocherkassk.

Intensive work is underway at the Don Museum to organize departments and set up new exhibits... The inventory is being checked, and new arrangements are being made. The museum will reflect the history of the Don Cossacks. The section on the history of the Don Cossacks will be expanded with materials from the Starocherkassk Museum, which will be moved to Novocherkassk. The history of Novocherkassk will be reflected in the historical section. Portraits of atamans, military leaders, and prominent public figures will be hung in the vestibule at the museum entrance.

— Bogachev wrote in the "Novocherkassk Bulletin" on 29 September 1942.

=== Repression ===
In 1943, he was arrested by the NKVD. He spent some time in Saratov Prison and was convicted by the military tribunal of the NKVD troops of Rostov Oblast on 5–6 June 1943 under Article 58, paragraph 1a, to 10 years of imprisonment followed by 5 years of disenfranchisement. From archival documents: "From 1944 to 1946, Bogachev worked in a special laboratory in Moscow; in the following seven years, he worked in a research laboratory in the camps of Ukhta and Vorkuta." He was released in 1953.

=== Later years ===
After his release, he returned to the Don region.

From 1956 to 1959, he worked at the Crimean Branch of the USSR Academy of Sciences, which was establishing the Institute of Mineral Resources in Simferopol.

From 1960, he lived in Baku, working at the Azerbaijan Scientific Research Institute for Oil Extraction (AzNII DN).

He died on 11 December 1965 in Baku and was buried in Sumqayit (Old Cemetery in the Jorat settlement).

== Family ==
Brother — Georgy Vladimirovich Bogachev (1889–1942) — mining engineer and hydrogeologist of the Caucasus and Central Asia.

First wife — Olga Orovna Bogacheva (née Dubyaga) — philologist, children:

- Alexey (1909–1977) — entomologist, Institute of Zoology of the Ukrainian SSR Academy of Sciences, Kyiv.
- Anastasia (1912–1993) — translator, physician.

Second wife — Alexandra Ilyinichna Shishkina-Bogacheva (née Ivanovich; 1887–1958) — associate professor, children:

- Dmitry (before 1920–1944) — entomologist.
- Marina, physician.

== Scientific Work ==
He studied the origin and evolution of freshwater fauna, the history of freshwater and brackish-water faunas of Eurasia, the North Caucasus, the Eastern Caucasus, Western Siberia, and Kazakhstan. He researched Cenozoic mollusks, describing over 500 species of Tertiary and Quaternary freshwater mollusks, and studied butterflies of the Don region, the Miocene of Novocherkassk, among other topics. He was the first researcher of the Binagadi Quaternary fauna site. Bogachev discovered many unknown species of extinct animals: a Miocene whale and dolphin, Pliocene dolphin, aurochs, gazelle, deer, and others.

In 1912, he published a book in Yuryev titled Atlantis: Mythical Atlantis and Geological Atlantis. Soviet scientist Nikolai Feodosievich Zhirov called Bogachev the founder of Russian scientific atlantology.

At the request of Don Ataman P. N. Krasnov, Bogachev quickly wrote the book Essays on the Geography of the Great Don Host, published in 1919. Bogachev emphasized that "the borders of the Host had undergone historical transformations by the time of writing" (referring primarily to the partial dismemberment of the Host territory by Peter the Great). The following year, the Bolsheviks completely abolished the Oblast of the Great Don Host as a political entity.

== Bibliography ==
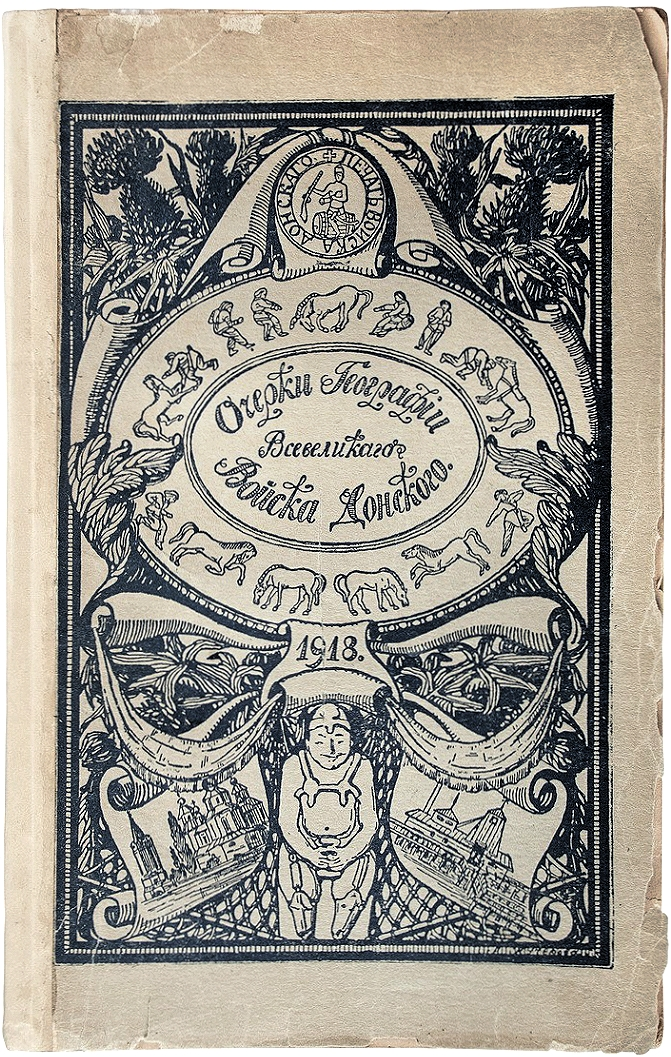
Essays on the Geography of the Oblast of the Great Don Host, 1918/1919

Author of over 200 scientific works, including studies on geology and paleontology:

- 1913 — History of the Caspian Sea; On the Geology of Boz-Dag
- 1922 — Colonies in the South Russian Neogene Seas
- 1924 — Freshwater Fauna of Eurasia
- 1932 — Geological Excursions Around Baku
- 1938 — Paleontological Notes; Miocene of Transcaucasia
- 1939 — Binagady: A Cemetery of Quaternary Fauna on the Absheron Peninsula
- 1961 — Materials on the History of the Freshwater Fauna of Eurasia.

== Literature ==
- Kovalevsky S. V.V. Bogachev // Izvestiya AN SSSR. Geological Series. 1966. No. 7. P. 132–133.
- Vtorov I.P. Vladimir Vladimirovich Bogachev (1881–1965): Scientist and Educator // Materials of the II International Conference of the Russian National Committee on the History and Philosophy of Science and Technology of the RAS, dedicated to the 300th anniversary of the Russian Academy of Sciences: [Moscow - St. Petersburg, February 26 – March 1, 2024]. Moscow: IIET RAS, 2024. P. 134–136.
