= Hinge line =

Place where a bivalve's halves meet

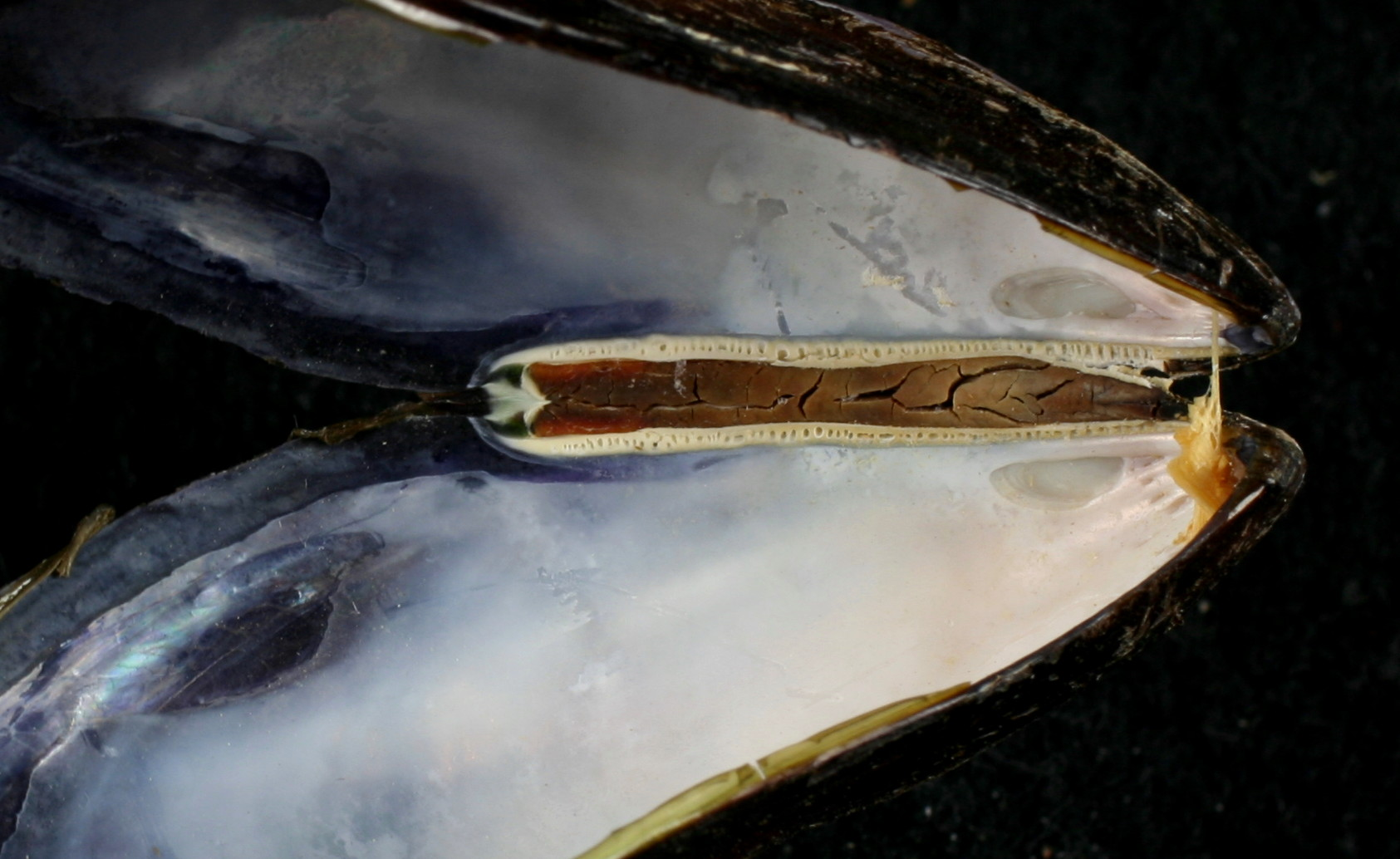
The hinge of a blue mussel, Mytilidae

A hinge line is an imaginary longitudinal line along the dorsal edge of the shell of a bivalve mollusk where the two valves hinge or articulate. The hinge line can easily be perceived in these images of a mussel shell and an ark shell.

The hinge teeth, structures which control the articulation of the valves, are often but not always situated along the hinge line.

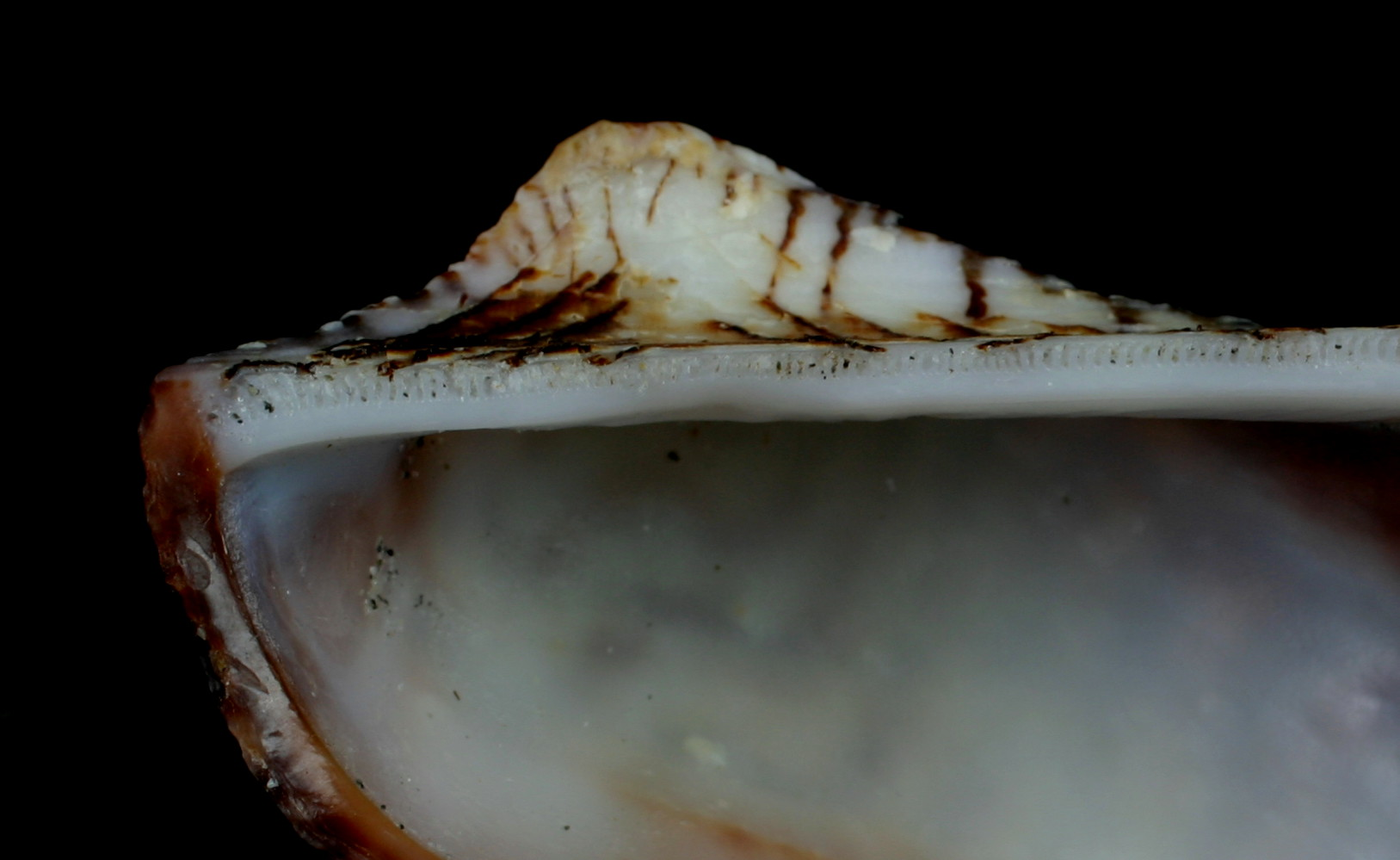
Part of the hinge line of one valve of an ark shell, Arcidae
