= Umbo (bivalve) =

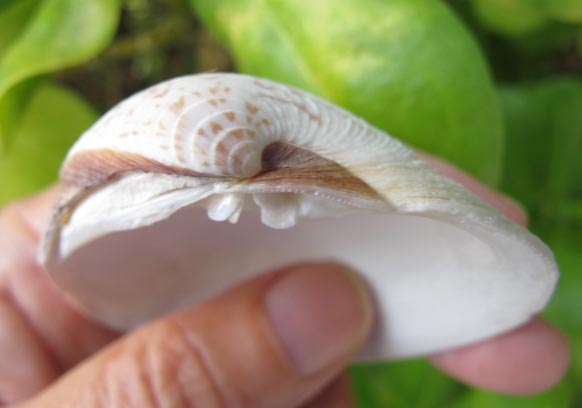
A left valve of a juvenile Mercenaria campechiensis viewed from the dorsal aspect in order to show the brown-tinted lunule on the right, next to the forward facing umbo.

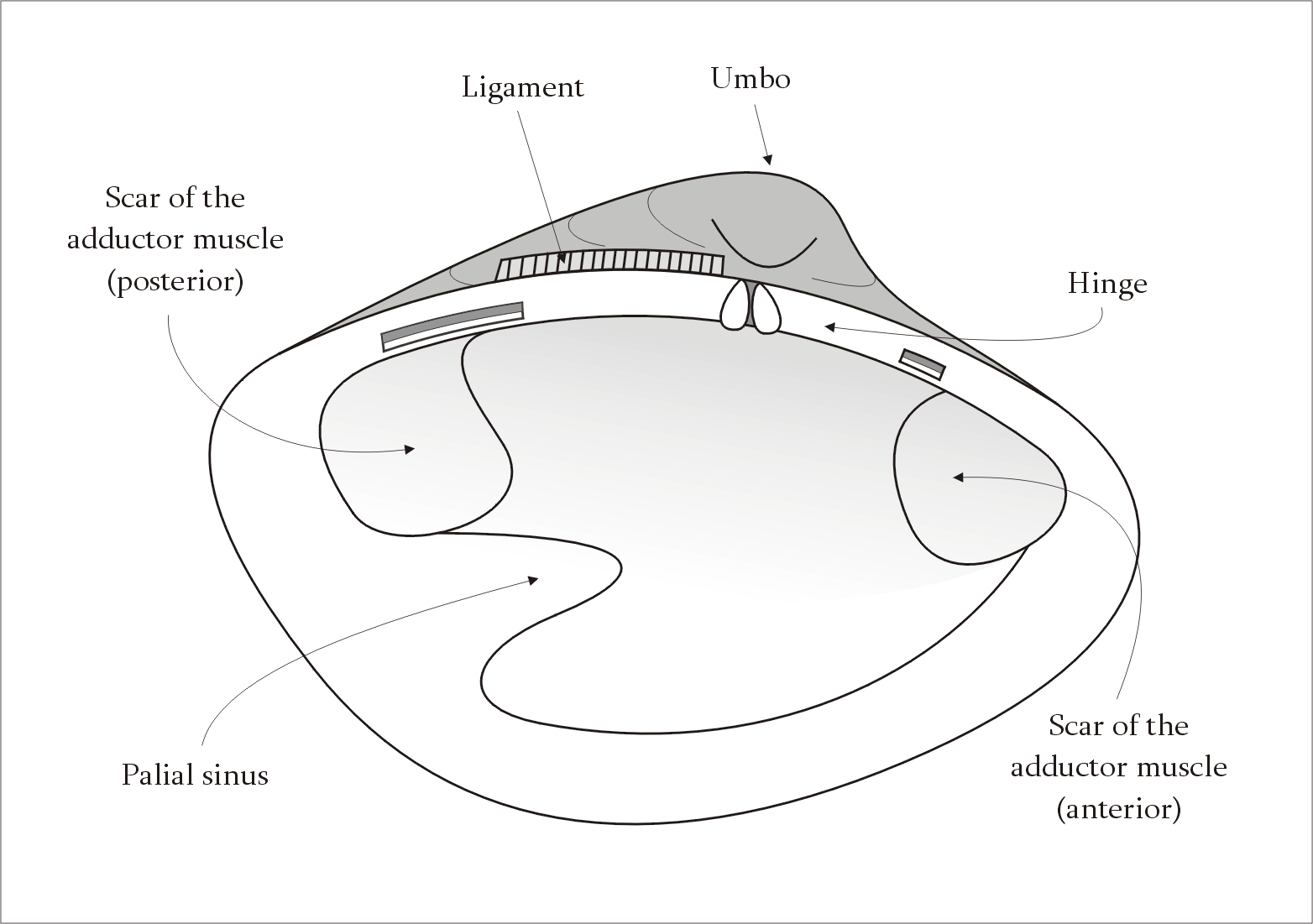
Diagram of the left valve of a bivalve resembling a venerid

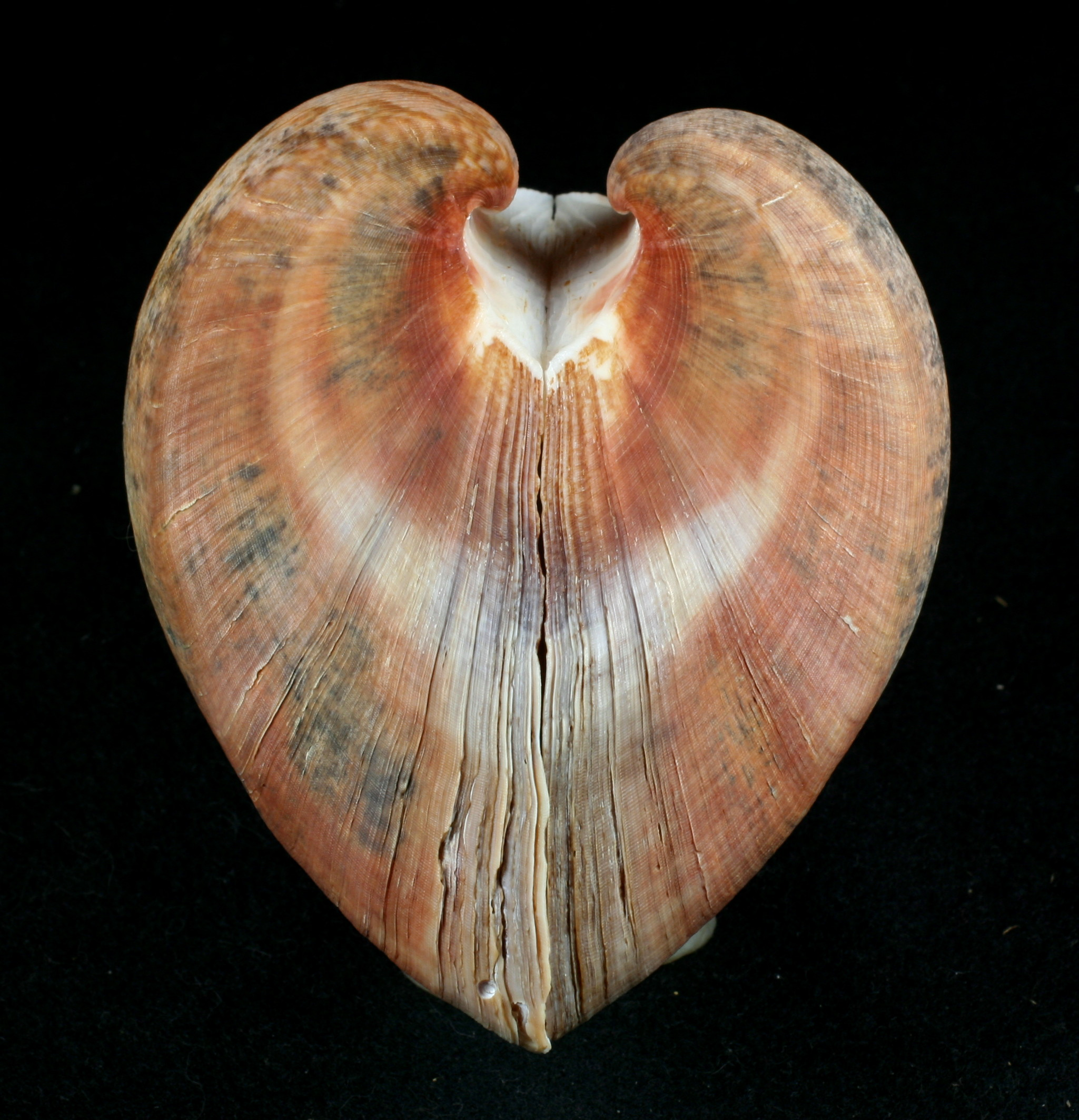
A side view of a whole shell of Cucullaea labiata (Lightfoot, 1786), the umbones are at the top of the image

Diagram of a bivalve shell viewed from the dorsal side: 1. plane of symmetry; 2. growth lines; 3. ligament; 4. umbo

The umbo (pl. umbones or umbos) is the vaguely defined, often most prominent, highest part of each valve of the shell of a bivalve or univalve mollusc. It usually contains the valve's beak, the oldest point of the valve, and its degree of prominence and position relative to the hinge line are sometimes helpful in distinguishing bivalve taxa. The umbo forms while the animal is a juvenile, and radial growth subsequently proceeds around that area. The umbo is situated above the hinge line.

In those bivalves where the umbones do not protrude, as is the case for example in some mussels, the umbones can nonetheless usually be readily identified by examining the concentric growth lines of the shell.

Umbo is also in use in anatomic descriptions of brachiopods, for the origin of growth of the valves.

== See also ==
- Beak (bivalve)
