= Bivalve shell =

Seashell

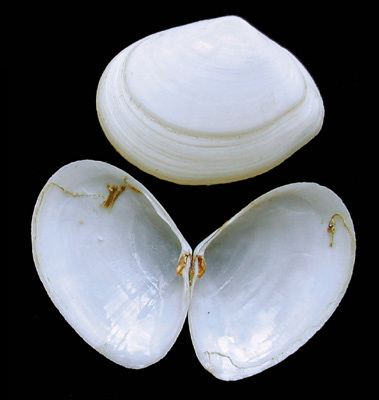
Two whole shells, one closed and one open, of the marine bivalve Abra alba

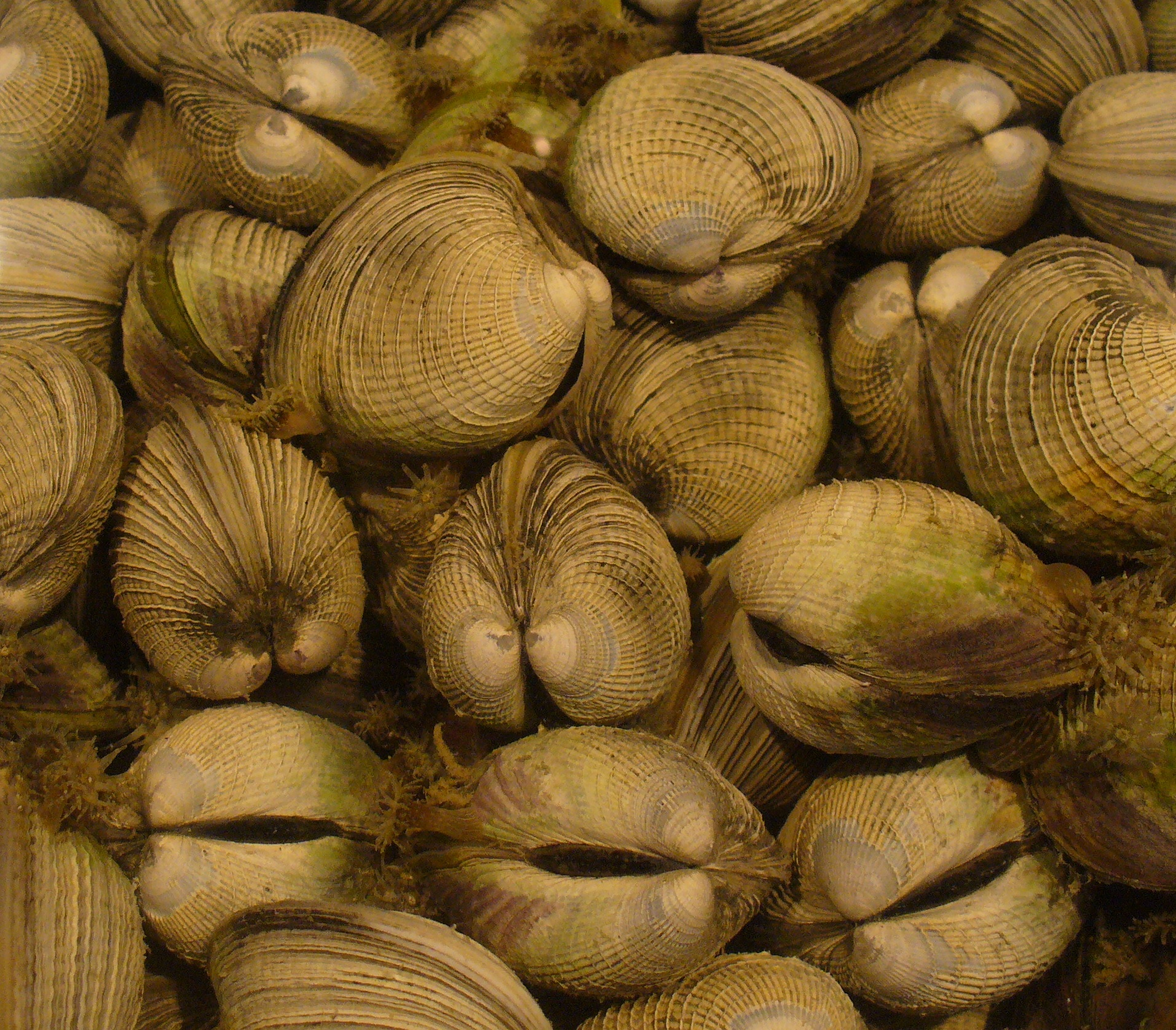
Live marine venerid cockles, Austrovenus stutchburyi from New Zealand

A bivalve shell is the enveloping exoskeleton or shell of a bivalve mollusc, composed of two hinged halves or valves. The two half-shells, called the "right valve" and "left valve", are joined by a ligament and usually articulate with one another using structures known as "teeth" which are situated along the hinge line. In many bivalve shells, the two valves are symmetrical along the hinge line — when truly symmetrical, such an animal is said to be equivalved; if the valves vary from each other in size or shape, inequivalved. If symmetrical front-to-back, the valves are said to be equilateral, and are otherwise considered inequilateral.

The bivalve shell not only serves as protection from predators and physical damage, but also for adductor muscle attachment, which can allow the mollusc to "swim" short distances by flapping the valves. The shell is secreted by a soft part of the molluscan body known as the mantle and has several layers, typically made of calcium carbonate precipitated out into an organic matrix.

Bivalves are very common in essentially all aquatic locales, including saltwater, brackish water and fresh water. The shells of dead bivalves commonly wash up on beaches (often as separate valves) and along the edges of lakes, rivers and streams. They are collected by professional and amateur conchologists and are sometimes harvested for commercial sale in the international shell trade or for use in glue, chalk, or varnish, occasionally to the detriment of the local ecology.

== Shell anatomy, structure and composition ==
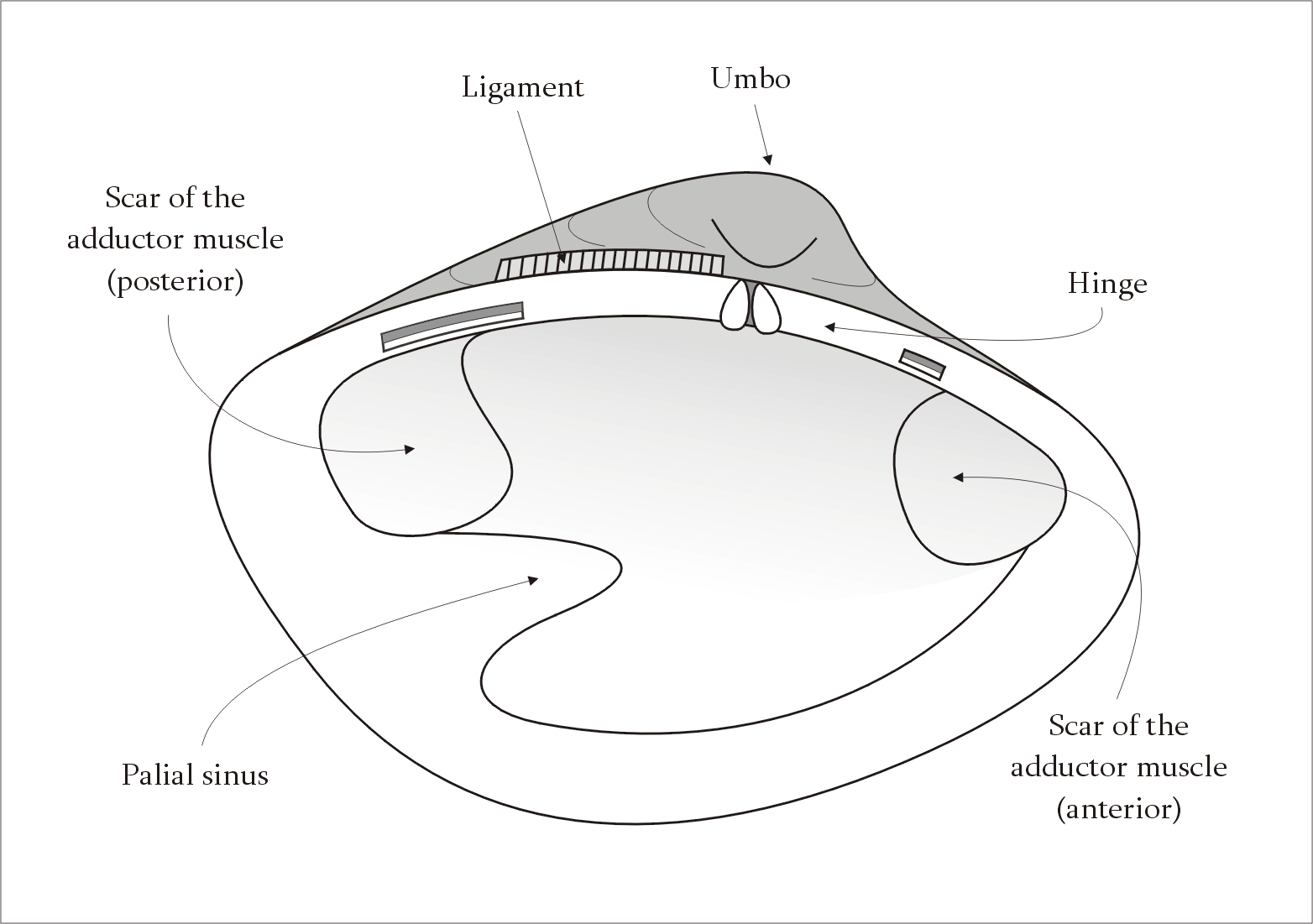
Diagram of the internal shell structure of the left valve of bivalve resembling a venerid

Dorsal view of a shell.: 1. Plane of symmetry; 2. Growth lines; 3. Ligament; 4. Umbo

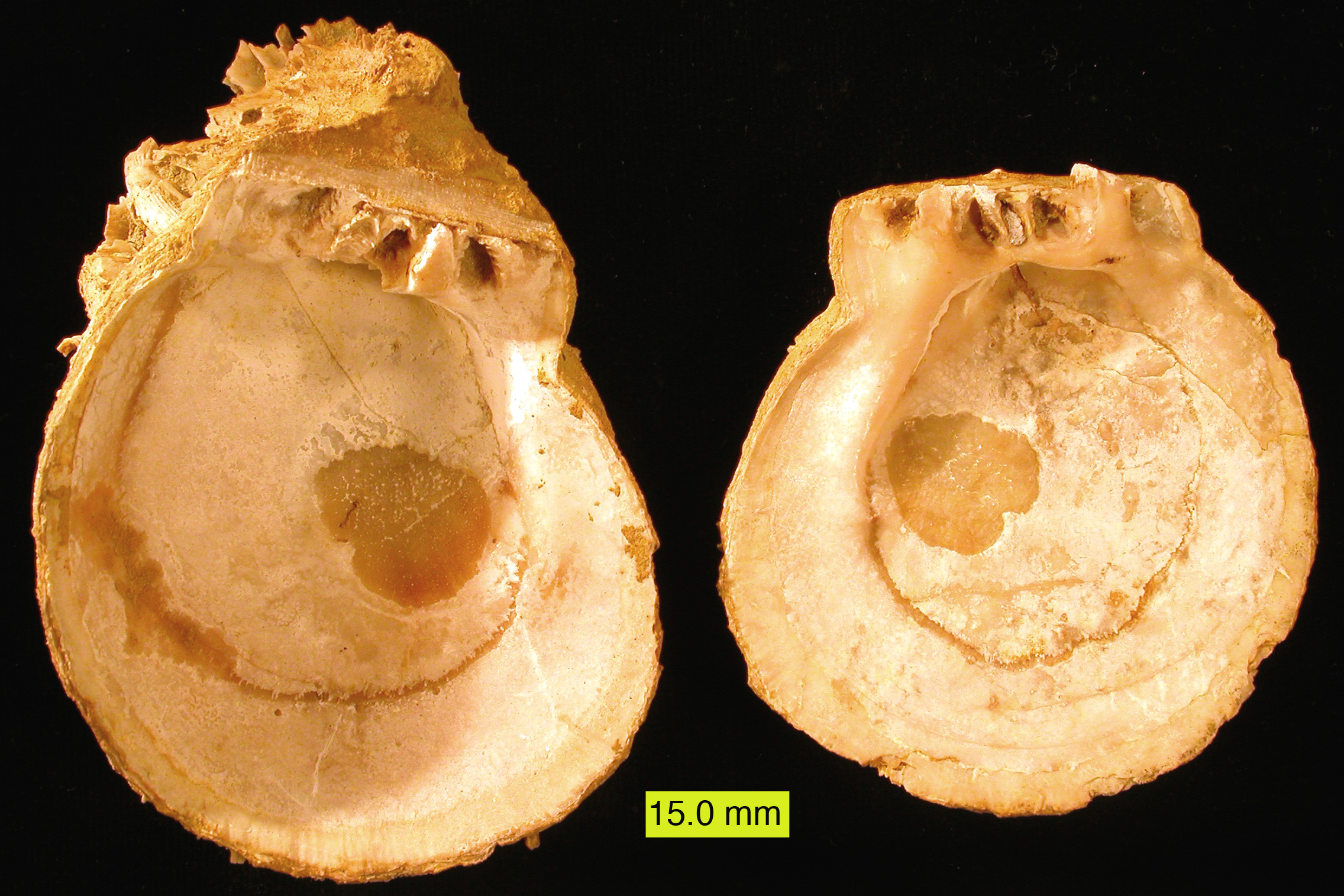
Paired valves of a fossil Spondylus shell (a "thorny oyster") showing the isodont, monomyarian, inequivalved condition, from the Pliocene deposits of Cyprus

The bivalve shell is composed of two calcareous valves. The mantle, a thin membrane surrounding the body, secretes the shell valves, ligament, and hinge teeth. The mantle lobes secrete the valves, and the mantle crest creates the other parts.

The mantle itself is attached to the shell by numerous small mantle retractor muscles, which are arranged in a narrow line along the length of the interior of the shell. The position of this line is often quite clearly visible on the inside of each valve of a bivalve shell, as a shiny line, the pallial line, which runs along a small distance in from the outer edge of each valve, usually joining the anterior adductor muscle scar to the posterior adductor muscle scar. The adductor muscles are what allow the bivalve to close the shell tightly.

In some bivalves the mantle edges fuse to form siphons, which take in and expel water during suspension feeding. Species which live buried in sediment usually have long siphons, and when the bivalve needs to close its shell, these siphons retract into a pocket-like space in the mantle. This feature of the internal anatomy of a bivalve is clearly indicated on the interior of the shell surface as a pallial sinus, an indentation in the pallial line. In addition, the water flows through incurrent siphon ventrally and exit out of the body through excurrent dorsally to the body.

The valves of the shell are made of either calcite (as with, e.g. oysters) or both calcite and aragonite, usually with the aragonite forming an inner layer, as is the case with the Pteriida which have this layer in the form of nacre or mother of pearl. The outermost layer of the shell is known as the periostracum and is composed of a horny organic substance. This sometimes forms a yellowish or brownish "skin" on the outside of the shell. The periostracum may start to peel off of a shell when the shell is allowed to dry out for long periods.

The shell is added to, and increases in size, in two ways—by increments added to the open edge of the shell, and by a gradual thickening throughout the animal's life.

The two shell valves are held together at the animal's dorsum by the ligament, which is composed of the tensilium and resilium. In life the ligament opens the shell (like a bent eraser in a door hinge), and the adductor muscle or muscles close the shell (like a person pulling the door closed by the handle). When a bivalve dies, its adductor muscle(s) relax and the resilium pushes the valves open.

== Mechanical properties ==
The mechanical properties of bivalve shells and their relatedness to microstructure was first published in 1969 by Stephen Wainwright at Duke University. Following this, eight main categories of bivalve microsections were defined: simple prismatic, composite prismatic, sheet nacreous, lenticular, foliated, crossed-lamellar, complex crossed-lamellar, and homogenous. Some of the most common structures to study are sheet nacreous, crossed-lamellar, and complex crossed-lamellar. On every order and structural hierarchy in the lamellae, a common structure to find is twinning, which occurs on both the microscale and nanoscale. Nanotwinning occurs with incoherent twin boundaries and grow preferentially in the (110) and (1-10) crystallographic directions.

Studying how these structures affect properties like Young's modulus, hardness, and toughness can help find mechanisms to improve modern materials, as well as study the effect of the environment on the health of the bivalve. For example, one type of bivalve, Cerastoderma edule, was studied with scanning electron microscopy (SEM) and nanoindentation to determine if exposure to higher levels of carbon dioxide would affect the structure of the shell. Fortunately for the bivalves, there appeared to be no strong correlation between exposure to high carbon dioxide partial pressures and shell hardness. The study did further confirm the general belief in a correlation between the size of bivalve microstructures and their properties, namely larger microstructures produced poorer results.

There are many factors that can affect the strength of bivalve shells. The outermost part of the shell has lower porosity, which results in a lower strength, while moving towards the innermost part of the shell increases strength. A general reader may believe that defects and non-uniformity would decrease the strength of the bivalve shell, but that is not necessarily the case. The length scale of defects in bivalve shells runs from millimeters to less than a nanometer and can form 1D, 2D, and 3D defects. The randomness of defects can decrease porosity, which prevents cracking. Along a similar vein, waviness in the lamellar planes will increase toughness, and increases in interfacial area, where two surfaces come into contact, will promote strength.

When looking at the outside of a bivalve shell, a viewer may notice several ridges along it. This is a hint that shells of bivalves experience anisotropy. For example, when a type of bivalve, Tridacna gigas, was modelled and analyzed, it was found to be highly oriented in along a singular axis. This occurrence was evidenced by the stiffest Young's modulus occurring at one set of poles on the material, and weakest in a direction between the other two poles. Those ridges at the edge of the shell also play a major part in distributing force and allowing for a stronger shell. Serrate margins describe the ripple pattern around the edge of the bivalve shell. Compression tests have revealed that the presence of those ridges allows for more resistance to fracture than those with polished edges.

It is difficult to summarize the strength and Young's modulus for bivalves as a whole because they vary greatly between different types of bivalves and their testing conditions. The Young's modulus in bivalves can run from as low as 11.8 GPa in the normal direction for Pinna muricata, to 77 GPa in the perpendicular direction for Pinctada maxima. Dried samples read higher Young's moduli values when compared to their wet counterparts and bending strength runs from 31 MPa when Saccostrea cucullata is measured in the normal direction, to past 350 MPa when calculated from compressive tests. While each type of bivalve varies greatly in their final measured strengths and properties, they share the same trends in how microstructure and even nanostructure affect the trends in those properties.

== Cementation ==
A few groups of bivalves are active swimmers like the scallops; many bivalves live buried in soft sediments (are infaunal) and can actively move around using their muscular foot; some bivalves such as blue mussels attach themselves to hard substrates using a byssus; other groups of bivalves (such as oysters, thorny oysters, jewel boxes, kitten's paws, jingle shells, etc.) cement their lower valve to a hard substrate (using shell material as cement) and this fixes them permanently in place. In many species of cemented bivalves (for example the jewel boxes), the lower valve is more deeply cupped than the upper valve, which tends to be rather flat. In some groups of cemented bivalves the lower or cemented valve is the left valve, in others it is the right valve.

== Orientation ==
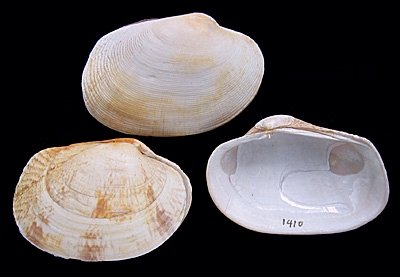
The lower right portion of this image shows a Venerupis senegalensis with a distinct pallial sinus on the viewer's right side/ animal's right valve which points towards the animal's posterior

The oldest point of a bivalve shell is called the beak, and the raised area around it is known as the umbo (plural umbones). The hinge area is the dorsum or back of the shell. The lower, curved margin is the ventral side.

The anterior or front of the shell is where the byssus and foot are located (if the animal has these structures) and the posterior or back of the shell is where the siphon is located (again, if present— the scallops, for example, do not have siphons). Without being able to view these organs, however, determining anterior and posterior can be rather more difficult. In those animals with a siphon, the pallial sinus of the siphon, which will be present on both the left and right valves, will point towards the animal's posterior— such valves are called sinopalliate.

Shells without a pallial sinus are termed integripalliate— such animals (as mentioned, the scallops as well as some other groups) often have a byssal notch present on the anterior end of the right valve (only), and the anterior auricles or "wings" of both valves will be either larger than, or equal to, the posterior ones. Such valves may also have a distinctive "comb" or ctinoleum within the byssal notch on the right valve. If a valve has neither notch nor comb nor sinus, and the auricles are of the same size, it is likely to be a left valve.

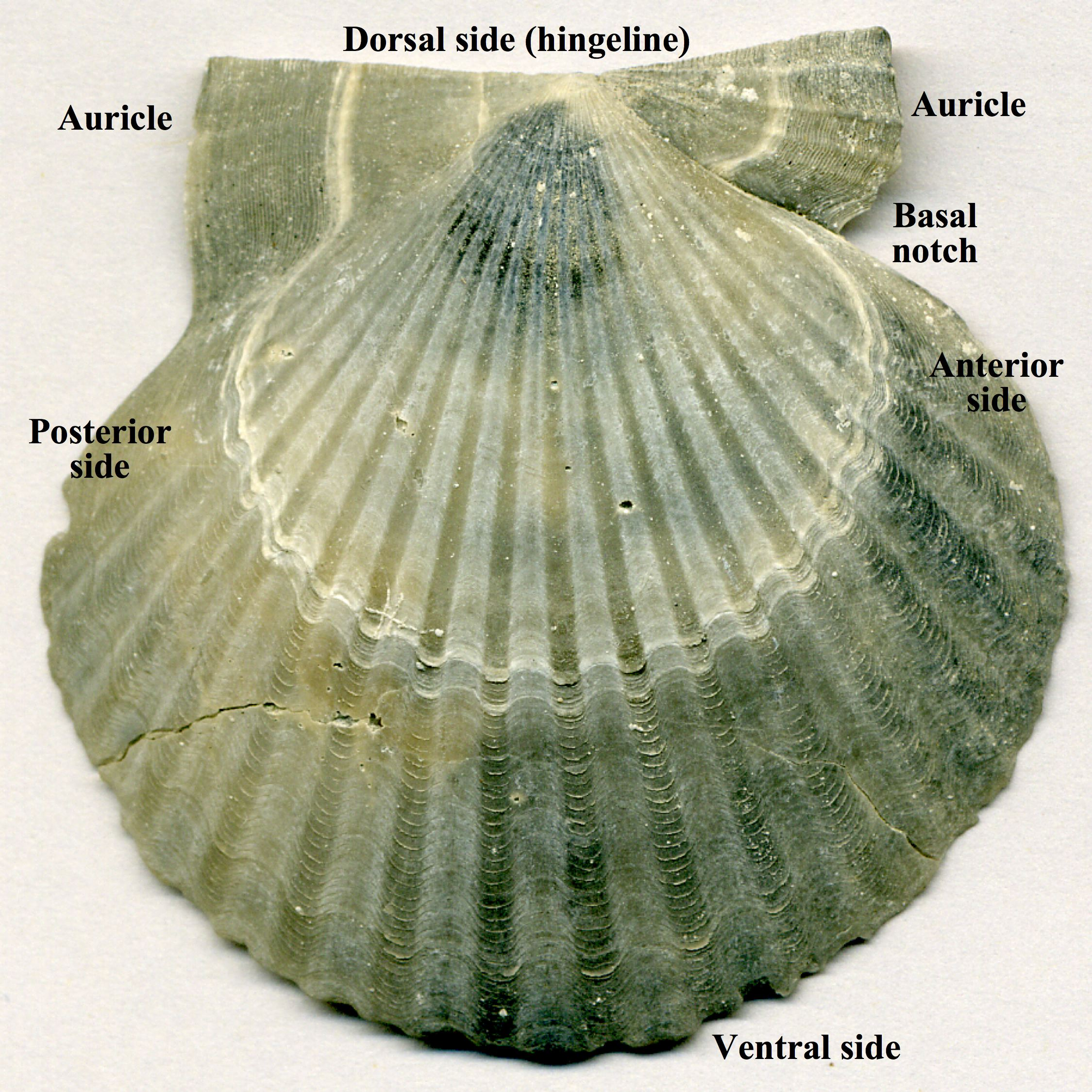
A fossil bivalve shell showing anterior and posterior wing or auricle

In those animals whose valves have an umbo that seems to "point", that point is most often towards the anterior part of the valve (though there are some exceptions to this rule). Also, in those bivalves with two adductor muscle scars of different sizes, the posterior scar will be the larger of the two and will be visible on both valves— this condition is referred to as being anisomyarian; if the scars are of equal size, this is termed isomyarian; if the valve has only one muscle scar, this is termed monomyarian. Furthermore, in those animals with a distinct external ligament, the ligament is usually to the posterior side of the umbo of both valves. Using one or more of these guidelines should strongly suggest the anterior/ posterior orientation of any given bivalve shell, and therefore whether any particular shell belongs to the right side or the left.

== Age estimation ==
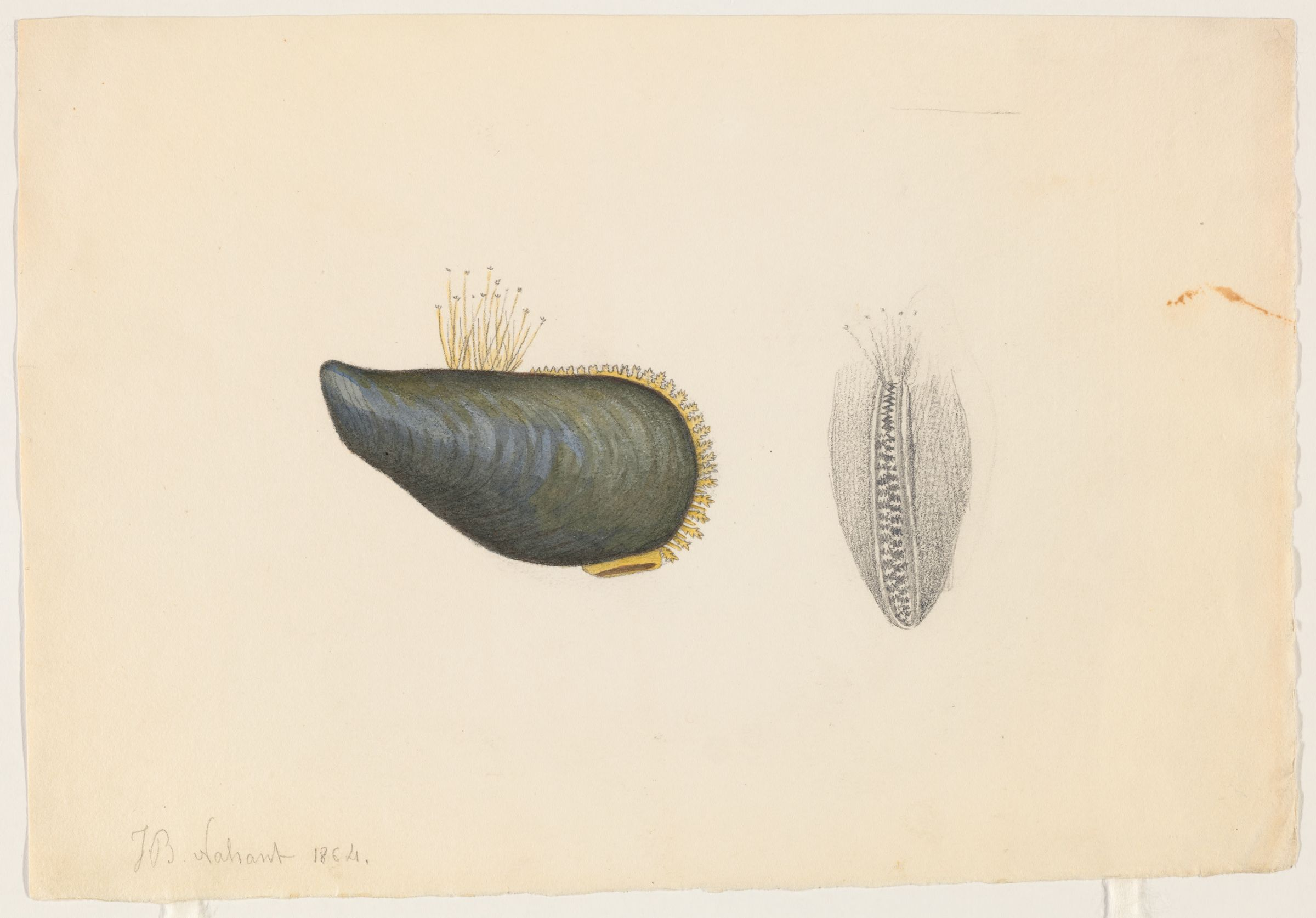
1864 watercolor of bivalve shells by Jacques Burkhardt.

The age of bivalve molluscs can be estimated in several ways. The Noah's Ark clam Arca noae has been used to compare these methods: the annual growth rings on the exterior of the valves can be counted at one per year and give a satisfactory result, but sometimes spurts of growth occur which may create an extra ring and cause confusion. Early rings may get worn away near the umbones and the narrow rings near the margin may be difficult to interpret in fully grown individuals. Similar annual pallial line scars on the interior of the valves are more easily seen in dark colored shells, but these may be overgrown and obscured by further deposition of hard material. Another method is the examination of the growth lines and bands seen in acetate peel replicas taken in the region of the umbones. The most accurate but most time-consuming method is the microscopic examination of sections through the outer prismatic layer of the shell. Using more than one of these methods should increase the accuracy of the result.

== Hinge teeth ==
The hinge teeth (dentition) or lack of them is an important feature of bivalve shells. They are generally conservative within major groups, and have historically provided a convenient means upon which to base classification schemes and the phylogenetic order. Some of the various hinge tooth arrangements are as follows:

- Taxodont; rows of similar interlocking teeth on either side of the umbones, as in the arc clams.
- Dysodont; weak teeth near the umbones, as in the marine mussels.
- Isodont; lateral tubercles and sockets on either side of a thick ligament referred to as a resilifer, typical of the oysters and scallops.
- Heterodont; with several wedge-shaped cardinal teeth set within the umbones, may or may not have elongated lateral teeth on either side. This arrangement is characteristic of the venus clams, cockles and several other important groups.
- Asthenodont; cardinal teeth replaced by a large chondrophore or resilifer, as in the soft-shell clams
- Anodont; true teeth absent in adults as in razor clams, and some freshwater mussels such as Anodonta and Anodontites

== Uses ==
Bivalve shells have many uses, leading international trade in bivalves and their shells. These uses include:

- Aesthetic
  - Jewellery, in particular nacre (mother of pearl)
  - High-quality Go stones
  - Conchology (in the sense of collection rather than research)
- Raw material
  - Chalk
  - Glue
  - Varnish
- Food
  - (Greenshell mussel) As a supplement for use against inflammation-associated arthritis in humans and animals, though a 2006 review suggested a lack of compelling evidence in human cases.
- Other
  - Shell money, a medium of exchange

== See also ==
- Aspein
- Molluscs in culture
