= Yaroslav Starobogatov =

Russian malacologist

Yaroslav Igorevich Starobogatov
- Born: 13 July 1932; Moscow
- Died: 3 December 2004 (aged 72); Saint Petersburg
- Education: Doctor of Science (1971); Professor
- Alma mater: Moscow State University (1955)
- Scientific career
- Fields: Zoology
- Workplaces: VINITI, Zoological Institute of RAS

Yaroslav Igorevich Starobogatov (Russian: Ярослав Игоревич Старобогатов; 13 July 1932 – 3 December 2004) was a Russian zoologist, professor and chief scientist at the Zoological Institute of the Russian Academy of Sciences. His research was on invertebrate zoology, particularly on molluscs (malacology) and crustaceans (carcinology). He also was a major contributor to the higher systematics of living organisms, to micro- and macroevolution and to Soviet and world-wide biogeography.

He described a great number of new animal species.

== Taxa named in his honour ==
- Neopilina starobogatovi Ivanov & Moskalev, 2007
