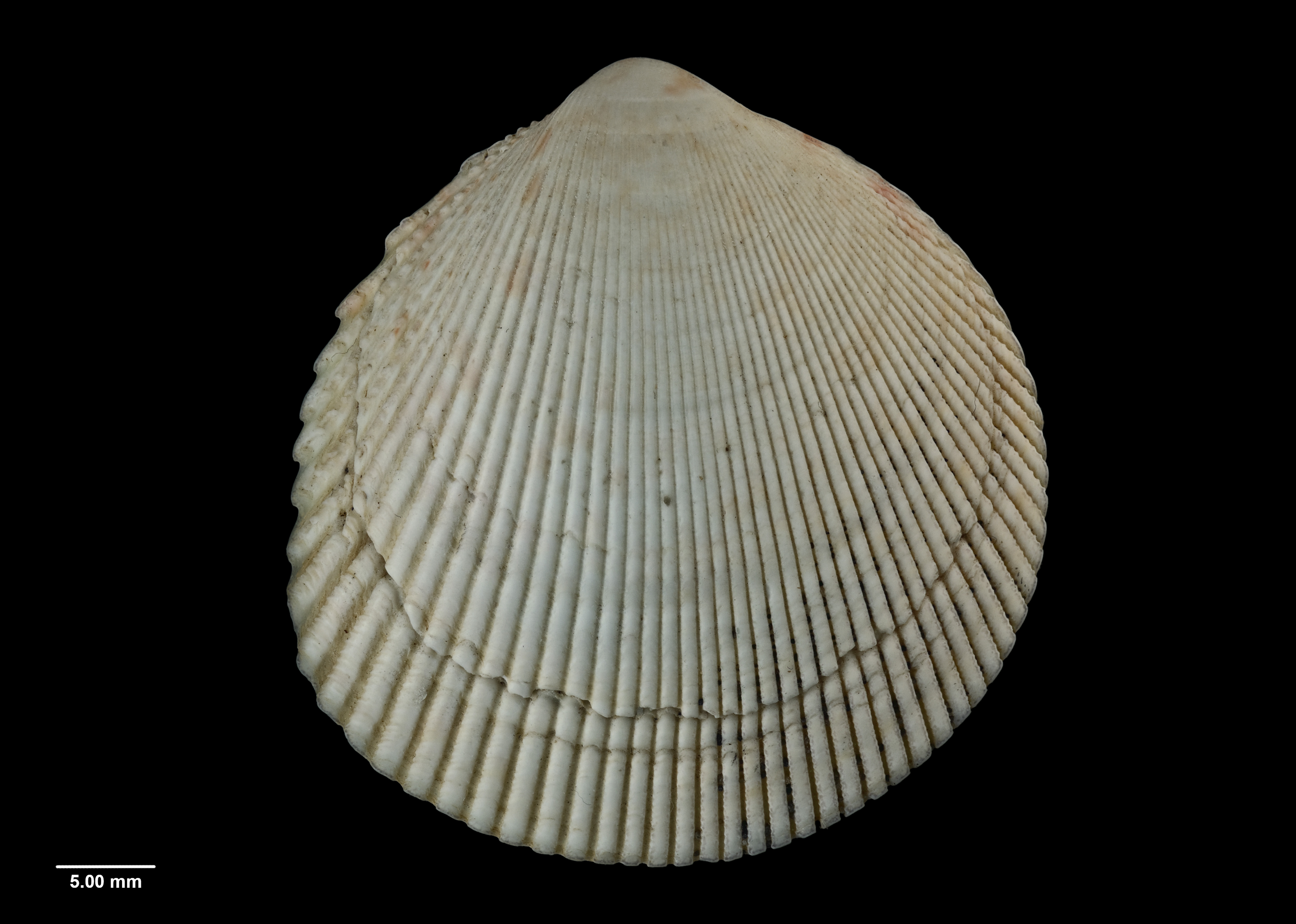
- Holotype of Acrosterigma sorenseni
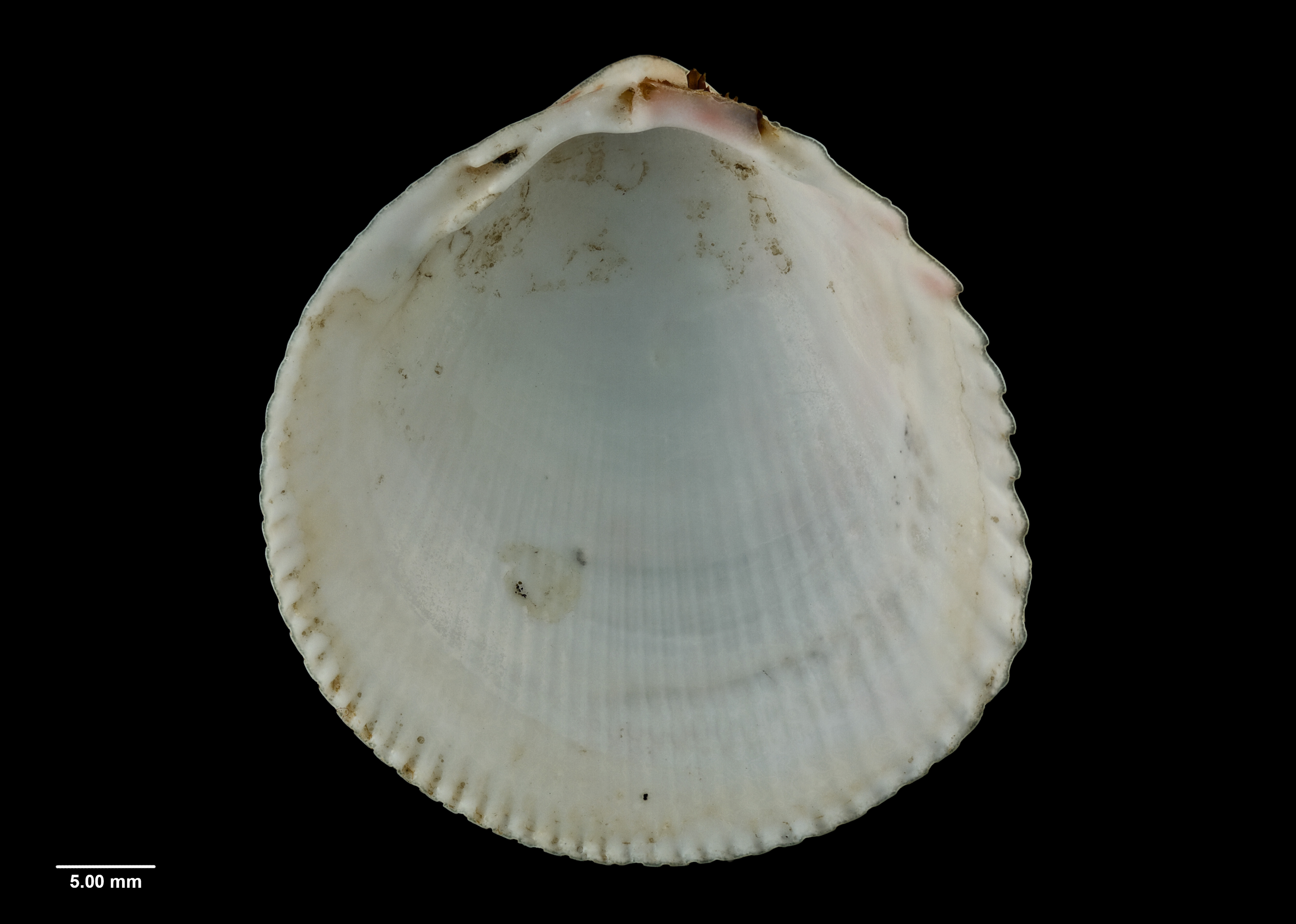

Conservation status
- Naturally Uncommon (NZ TCS)

Scientific classification
- Kingdom: Animalia
- Phylum: Mollusca
- Class: Bivalvia
- Superorder: Imparidentia
- Order: Cardiida
- Superfamily: Cardioidea
- Family: Cardiidae
- Genus: Acrosterigma
- Species: A. sorenseni

Binomial name
- Acrosterigma sorenseni (A. W. B. Powell, 1958)

Synonyms
- Trachycardium (Vasticardium) sorenseni A. W. B. Powell, 1958; Trachycardium sorenseni A. W. B. Powell, 1958

= Acrosterigma sorenseni =

Species of bivalve

Acrosterigma sorenseni is a species of cockle, a marine bivalve mollusk, in the family Cardiidae. The species is endemic to New Zealand, found in the waters surrounding the Kermadec Islands.

== Description ==
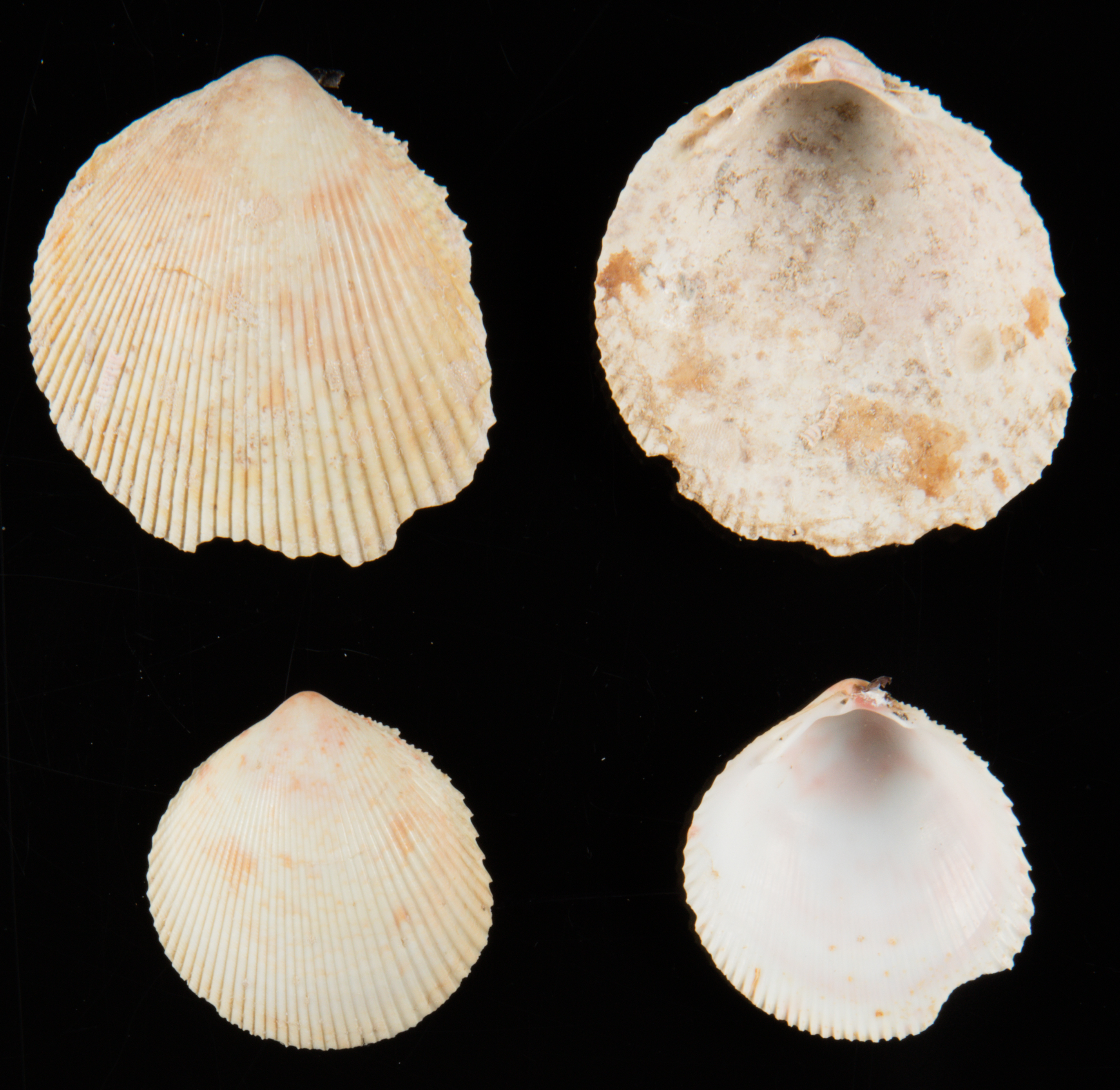
Type specimen collected in 1991

Acrosterigma sorenseni is subcircular, has acute beaks, and is flattened and incurved. The species has a sculpture consisting of 54 flat-topped radial ribs, defined sharply by deeply channelled linear interspaces crenulate at the sides. The species' shell is pinkish-white blotched with orange and pink when young. The shells measure between 25–45 mm (0.98–1.77 in) in height, which is small for the genus. The species can be differentiated from A. cygnorum due to having a higher rib number, having square-sided ribs, and wider ridges on the ribs.

== Taxonomy ==
The species was first described using the name Trachycardium (Vasticardium) sorenseni in 1958 by Baden Powell, based on a holotype found off the coast of Raoul Island in the Kermadec Islands, at a depth between 75–85 m (246–279 ft). The holotype of the species is held at the Auckland War Memorial Museum. In 1999 the species had been recombined by Jacques Vidal, who placed it in the genus Acrosterigma.

== Distribution and habitat ==
The species is endemic to the waters surrounding the Kermadec Islands, northeast of mainland New Zealand. They are typically found at a depth of between 15–47 m (49–154 ft) from the shores of the islands, with shells of dead specimens washing up onto beaches.
