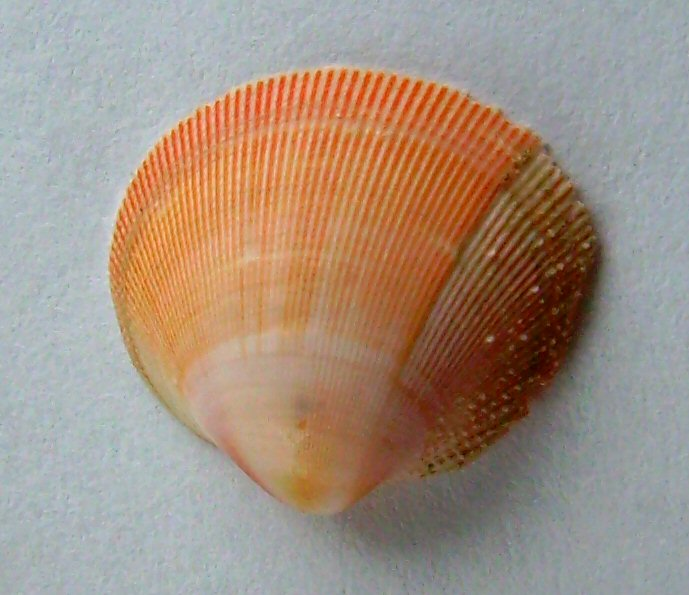

Scientific classification
- Kingdom: Animalia
- Phylum: Mollusca
- Class: Bivalvia
- Order: Cardiida
- Family: Cardiidae
- Genus: Pratulum
- Species: P. pulchellum

Binomial name
- Pratulum pulchellum (Gray, 1843)

Synonyms
- Cardium pulchellum Gray, 1843

= Pratulum pulchellum =

Species of bivalve

Pratulum pulchellum is a species of cockle, a marine bivalve mollusc in the family Cardiidae.

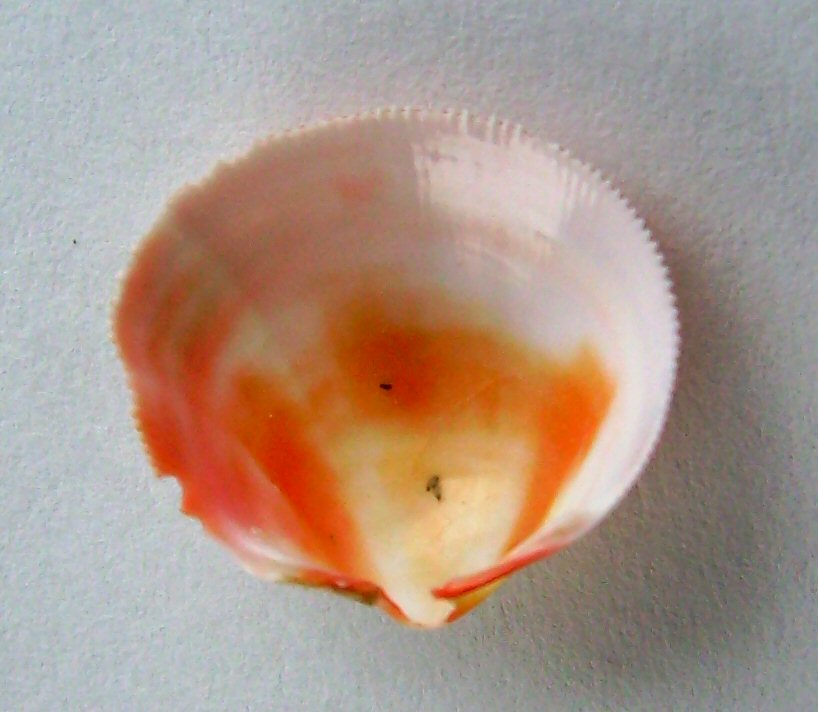
Pratulum pulchellum inside view
