= Pratul =

Pratul may refer to–

- Pratul Chandra Ganguli (1884–1957), Indian Bengali revolutionary
- Pratul Mukhopadhyay (1942–2025), Bengali singer, creative artist and songwriter

== See also ==
- Pratulum, a genus of marine bivalve molluscs in the family Cardiidae
