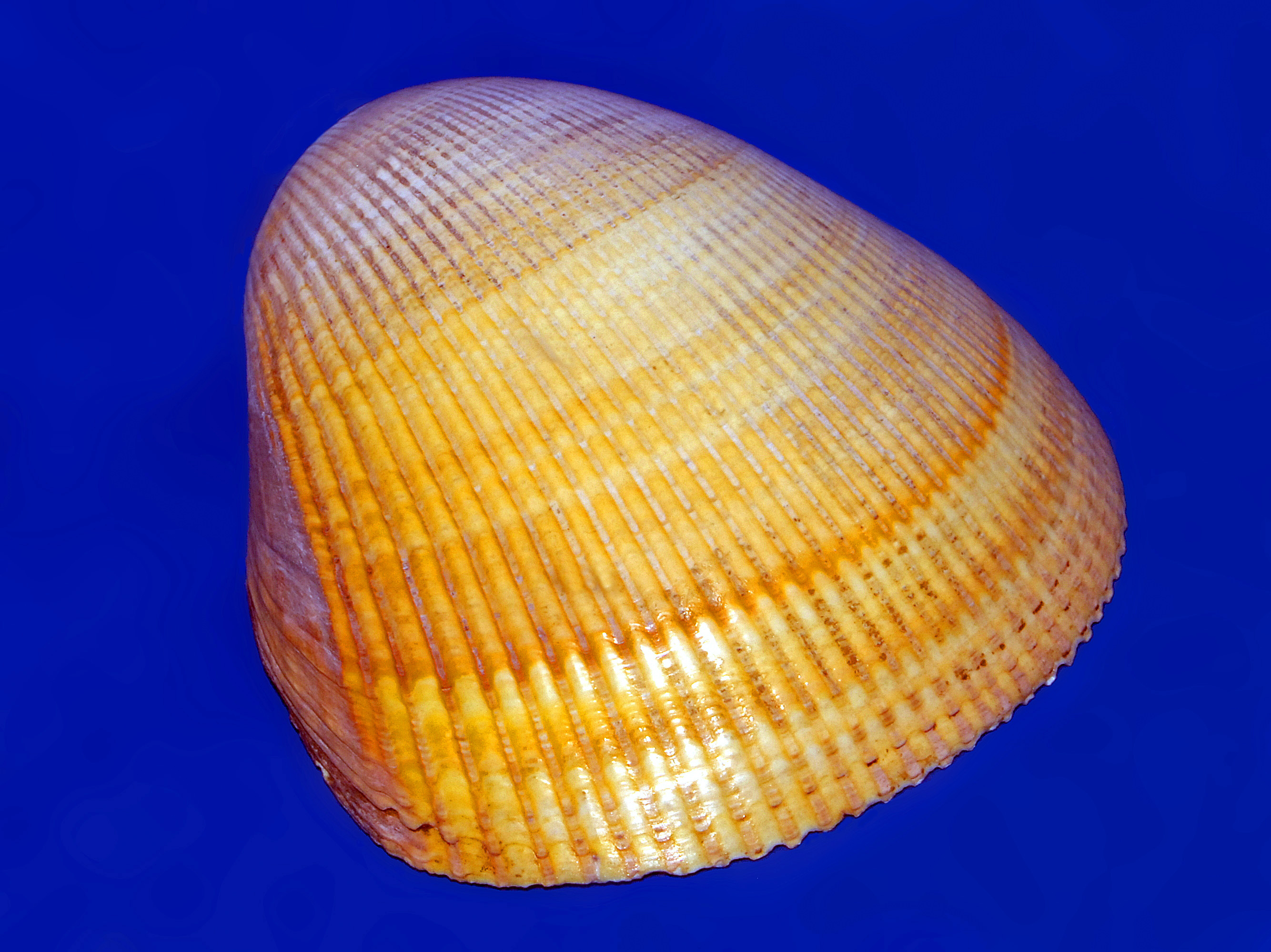

Scientific classification
- Kingdom: Animalia
- Phylum: Mollusca
- Class: Bivalvia
- Order: Cardiida
- Family: Cardiidae
- Genus: Acrosterigma
- Species: A. magnum

Binomial name
- Acrosterigma magnum (Linnaeus, 1758)

Synonyms
- Cardium leucostomum Born, 1780 (synonym); Cardium magnum Linnaeus, 1758 (new comb.); Cardium marmoreum Lamarck, 1819 (synonym); Cardium subelongatum G.B. Sowerby II, 1840 (synonym); Trachycardium magnum (Linnaeus, 1758)

= Acrosterigma magnum =

Species of bivalve

Acrosterigma magnum, or the magnum cockle, is a species of bivalve mollusc in the family Cardiidae, the true cockles.

== Description ==
Acrosterigma magnum has a shell reaching a length of 38 – 48 mm.

== Distribution ==
This species is found in Caribbean waters, ranging from the Florida Keys to the Gulf of Mexico and northern Brazil.
