= Laevicardium sybariticum =

Scientific classification
- Kingdom: Animalia
- Phylum: Mollusca
- Class: Bivalvia
- Order: Cardiida
- Family: Cardiidae
- Genus: Laevicardium
- Species: L. sybariticum

Binomial name
- Laevicardium sybariticum (Dall, 1886)

Species of bivalve

Laevicardium sybariticum, or Dall's egg cockle, is a species of bivalve mollusc in the family Cardiidae. It can be found along the Atlantic coast of North America, ranging from Florida to the West Indies. It was first described by Dall in 1886.
