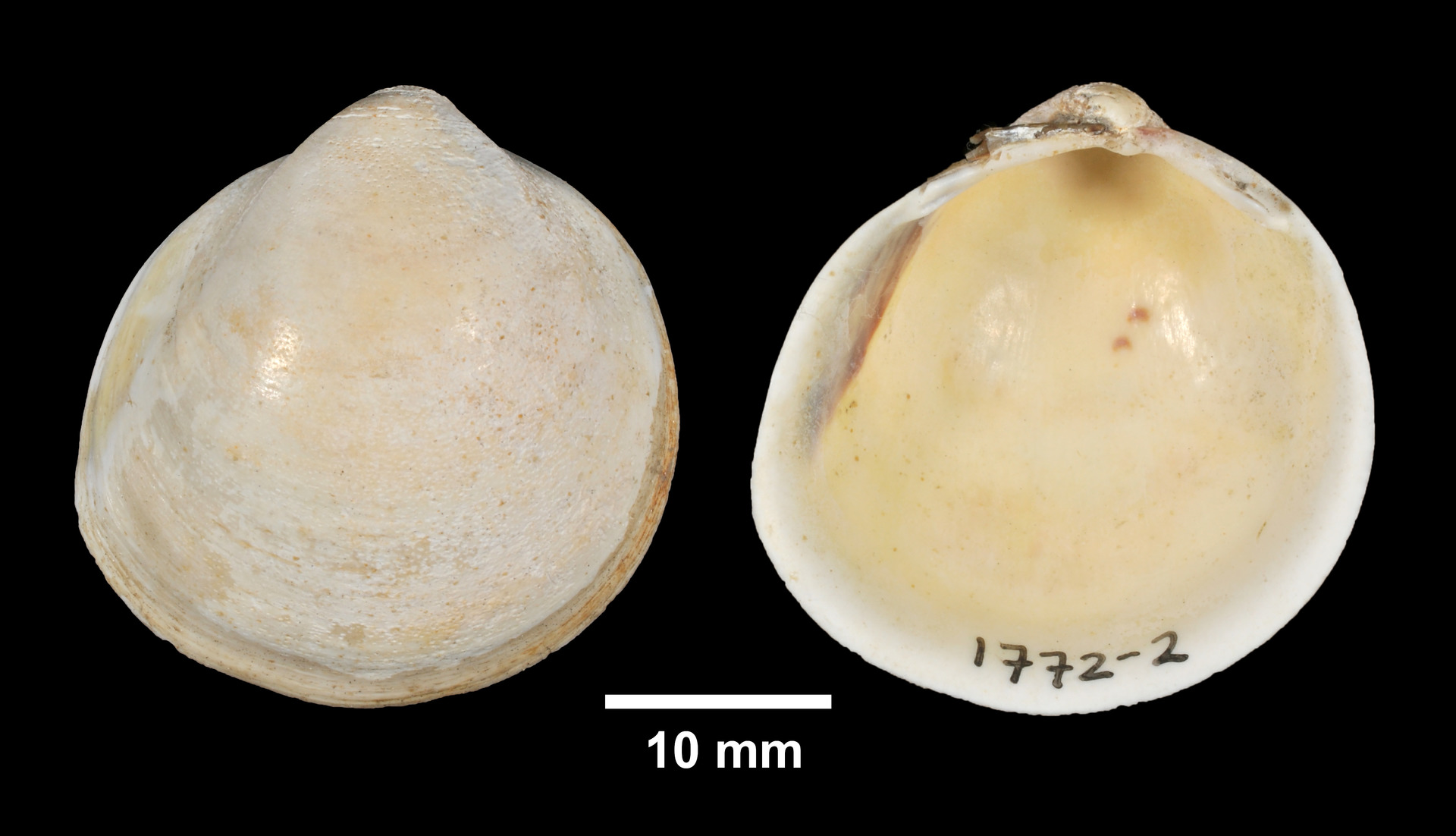

Conservation status
- Secure (NatureServe)

Scientific classification
- Kingdom: Animalia
- Phylum: Mollusca
- Class: Bivalvia
- Order: Cardiida
- Family: Cardiidae
- Genus: Laevicardium
- Species: L. mortoni

Binomial name
- Laevicardium mortoni (Conrad, 1830)

= Laevicardium mortoni =

Species of bivalve

Laevicardium mortoni, or Morton's egg cockle, is a species of bivalve mollusc in the family Cardiidae.

Right and left valve of the same specimen:

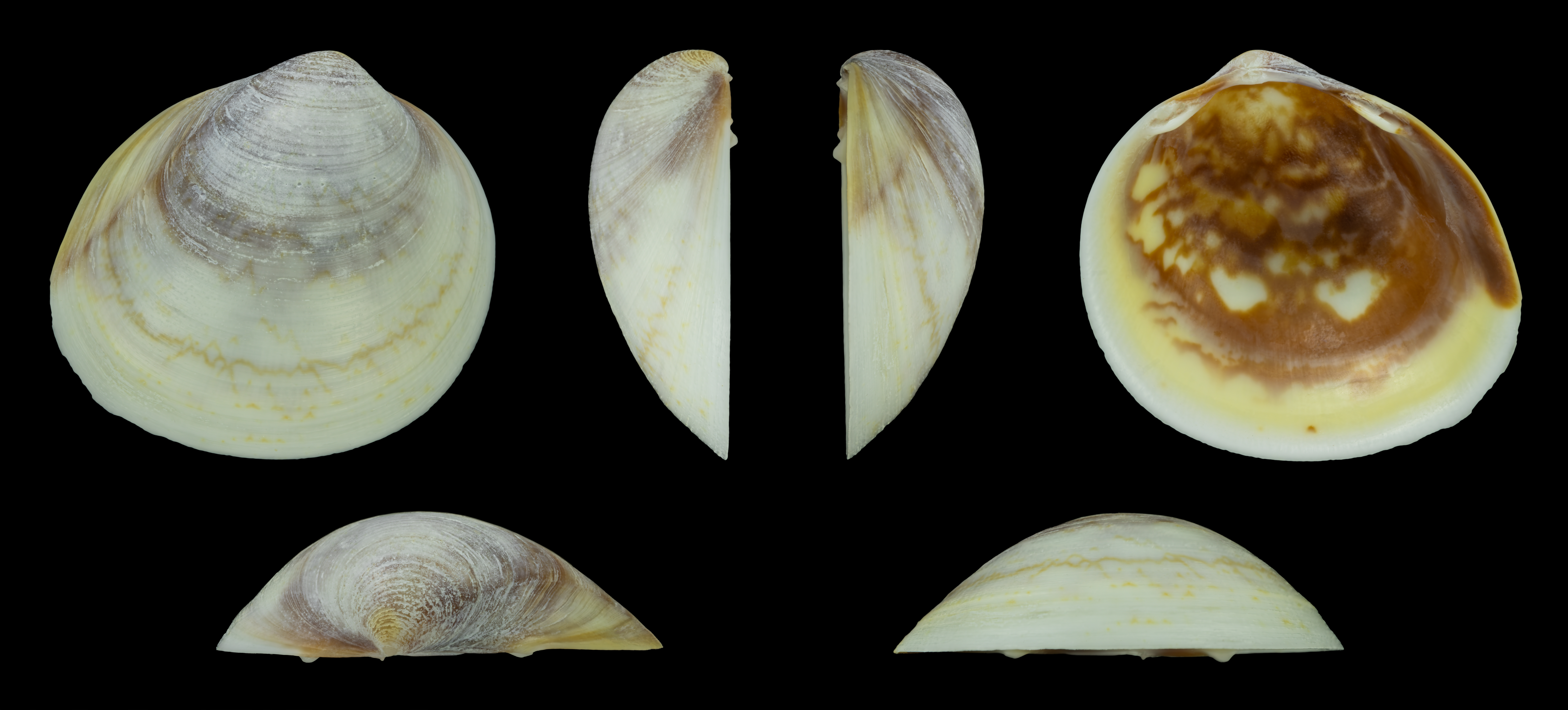
Right valve

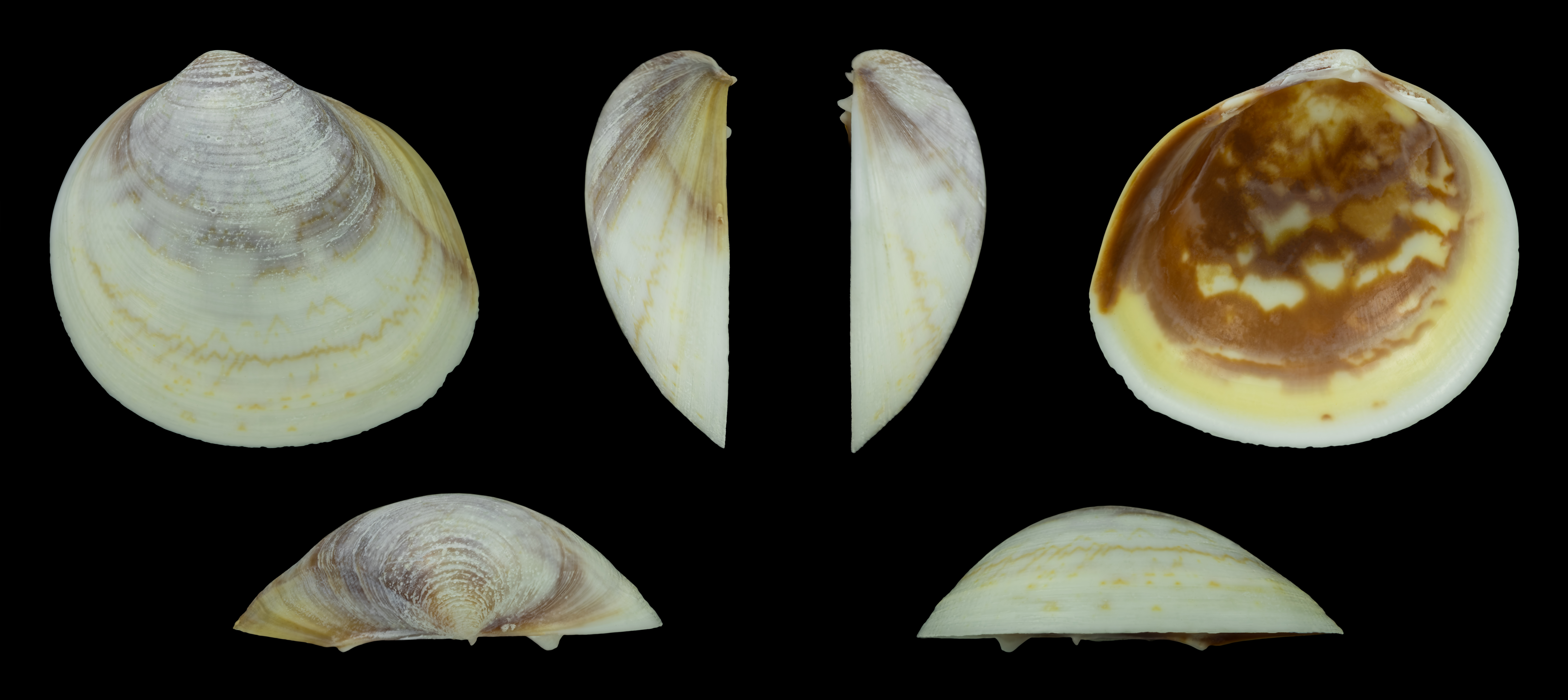
Left valve

== Distribution ==
Atlantic coast of North America, ranging from Nova Scotia to Brazil.
