= Parvicardium hauniense =

Conservation status
- Vulnerable (IUCN 3.1)

Scientific classification
- Kingdom: Animalia
- Phylum: Mollusca
- Class: Bivalvia
- Order: Cardiida
- Family: Cardiidae
- Genus: Parvicardium
- Species: P. hauniense

Binomial name
- Parvicardium hauniense (Petersen & Russell, 1971)

Species of bivalve

Parvicardium hauniense is a species of mollusc, known as Copenhagen cockle. It is an endemic species to the Baltic Sea.

The species was described in 1971 by G. Høpner Petersen and P. Russell. Its original scientific name was Cardium hauniense.

They are around 5mm in size with an oblique oval shape and have a thin shell. They are found in the Baltic Sea.
