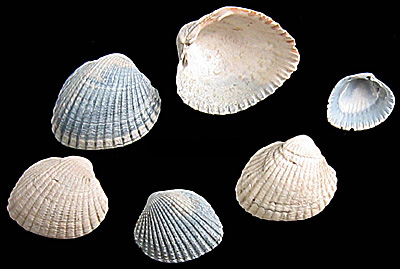
- Parvicardium exiguum

Scientific classification
- Kingdom: Animalia
- Phylum: Mollusca
- Class: Bivalvia
- Order: Cardiida
- Superfamily: Cardioidea
- Family: Cardiidae
- Genus: Parvicardium; Monterosato, 1884

Type species
- Cardium parvum Philippi, 1844

Synonyms
- Balticardium Lambiotte, 1979 (junior subjective synonym); Cardium (Parvicardium) Monterosato, 1884 (original rank); Cerastobyssum Høpner Petersen & Russell, 1974 (Junior synonym)

= Parvicardium =

Genus of molluscs

Parvicardium is a genus of bivalves belonging to the subfamily Lymnocardiinae of the family Cardiidae.

The genus has an almost cosmopolitan distribution.

== Species ==
- †Parvicardium benoisti (Cossmann, 1896)
- Parvicardium carrozzai van Aartsen & Goud, 2001
- Parvicardium exiguum (Gmelin, 1791)
- Parvicardium hauniense (Petersen & Russell, 1971)
- Parvicardium mikii Matsubara, 2011
- Parvicardium pinnulatum (Conrad, 1831)
- Parvicardium scabrum (Philippi, 1844)
- Parvicardium scriptum (Bucquoy, Dautzenberg & Dollfus, 1892)
- Parvicardium simile (Milaschewitsch, 1909)
- Parvicardium sonense (Cossmann, 1896)
- Parvicardium trapezium Cecalupo & Quadri, 1996
- Parvicardium triangulatum Leubriére, 1881
- Parvicardium vroomi van Aartsen, Menkhorst & Gittenberger, 1984

Species brought into synonymy

- † Parvicardium brykense Goncharova & Zhgenti, 1989: synonym of † Chokrakia brykense (Goncharova & Zhgenti, 1989)
- Parvicardium elegantulum (Møller, 1842): synonym of Goethemia elegantula (Møller, 1842)
- Parvicardium nodosum W. Turton, 1822 non Montagu, 1803: synonym of Parvicardium scabrum (Philippi, 1844)
- Parvicardium ovale (G. B. Sowerby II, 1840): synonym of Parvicardium pinnulatum (Conrad, 1831)
- Parvicardium ovale (G. B. Sowerby II, 1840) sensu Spada & Della Bella, 1990: synonym of Parvicardium scriptum (Bucquoy, Dautzenberg & Dollfus, 1892)
- Parvicardium papillosum (Poli, 1791): synonym of Papillicardium papillosum (Poli, 1791)
- Parvicardium suezensis Issel, 1869: synonym of Fragum sueziense (Issel, 1869)
- Parvicardium transclathratum (Viader, 1951): synonym of Fragum sueziense (Issel, 1869)
- Parvicardium turtoni (G.B. Sowerby III, 1894): synonym of Papillicardium turtoni (G. B. Sowerby III, 1894)
