= Papyridea soleniformis =

Scientific classification
- Kingdom: Animalia
- Phylum: Mollusca
- Class: Bivalvia
- Order: Cardiida
- Family: Cardiidae
- Genus: Papyridea
- Species: P. soleniformis

Binomial name
- Papyridea soleniformis (Bruguiere, 1789)

Species of bivalve

Papyridea soleniformis, the spiny paper cockle, is a species of bivalve mollusc in the family Cardiidae. It can be found along the Atlantic coast of North America, ranging from North Carolina to the West Indies.
