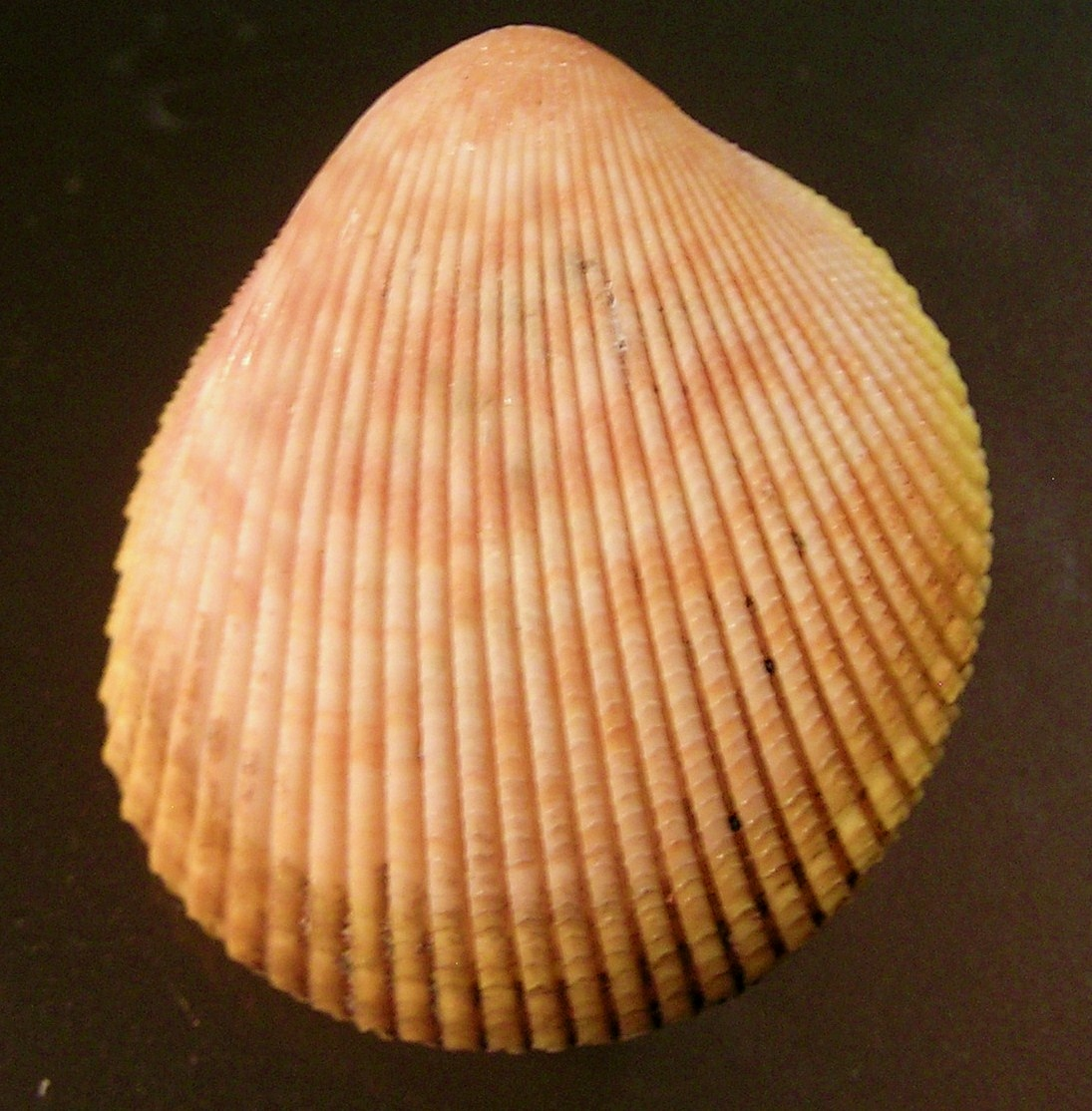
- Acrosterigma cygnorum (Deshayes, 1855)

Scientific classification
- Kingdom: Animalia
- Phylum: Mollusca
- Class: Bivalvia
- Order: Cardiida
- Superfamily: Cardioidea
- Family: Cardiidae
- Genus: Acrosterigma; Dall, 1900

Synonyms
- † Cardium dalli Heilprin, 1886

= Acrosterigma =

Genus of bivalves

Acrosterigma is a genus of large saltwater clams or cockles, marine bivalve mollusc in the family Cardiidae, the cockles.

== Species ==
- Acrosterigma amirante Vidal, 1999
- Acrosterigma attenuatum (G. B. Sowerby II, 1841)
- Acrosterigma biradiatum (Bruguière, 1789)
- Acrosterigma burchardi (Dunker, 1877)
- Acrosterigma capricorne Vidal & Kirkendale, 2007
- Acrosterigma cygnorum (Deshayes, 1855)
- † Acrosterigma dalli (Heilprin, 1886)
- † Acrosterigma delectabile (P. A. Maxwell, 1978)
- Acrosterigma dianthinum (Melvill & Standen, 1899)
- Acrosterigma discus Vidal, 1999
- Acrosterigma extremattenuatum ter Poorten & Kirkendale, 2017
- † Acrosterigma fraternum (Mayer, 1864)
- Acrosterigma hobbsae Vidal, 1999
- Acrosterigma impolitum (G.B. Sowerby II, 1841)
- Acrosterigma kerslakae Healy & Lamprell, 1992
- Acrosterigma lomboke (Vidal, 2003)
- Acrosterigma maculosum (W. Wood, 1815)
- Acrosterigma magnum (Linnaeus, 1758)
- Acrosterigma marielae Wilson & Stevenson, 1977
- Acrosterigma mauritianum (Deshayes, 1855)
- Acrosterigma oxygonum (G.B. Sowerby II, 1834)
- † Acrosterigma paulayi Vidal, 1999
- † Acrosterigma praecygnorum (Ludbrook, 1955)
- Acrosterigma pristipleura (Dall, 1901)
- Acrosterigma profundum Vidal, 1999
- Acrosterigma punctolineatum Healy & Lamprell, 1992
- Acrosterigma selene Vidal, 1999
- Acrosterigma seurati Vidal, 1999
- Acrosterigma simplex (Spengler, 1799)
- Acrosterigma sorenseni (Powell, 1958)
- Acrosterigma subassimile (Vidal, 2003): synonym of Vasticardium subassimile J. Vidal, 2003
- Acrosterigma suduirauti Vidal & Ter Poorten, 2007
- Acrosterigma suluanum Vidal, 1999
- Acrosterigma terpoorteni Thach, 2017
- Acrosterigma transcendens (Melvill & Standen, 1899)
- Acrosterigma triangulare Raines & Huber, 2012
- Acrosterigma uniornatum Vidal, 1999
- Acrosterigma variegatum (G.B. Sowerby II, 1840)
- Acrosterigma zamboangaense ter Poorten & Hobbs, 2023

== Synonyms ==
- Acrosterigma abrolhense J. Vidal, 1999: synonym of Acrosterigma cygnorum (Deshayes, 1855) (junior subjective synonym)
- Acrosterigma alternatum (G. B. Sowerby II, 1840): synonym of Vasticardium angulatum (Lamarck, 1819)
- Acrosterigma arenicola (Reeve, 1845): synonym of Acrosterigma maculosum (W. Wood, 1815) represented as Acrosterigma maculosum maculosum (W. Wood, 1815) (junior subjective synonym)
- Acrosterigma dampierense B. R. Wilson & Stevenson, 1977: synonym of Acrosterigma impolitum (G. B. Sowerby II, 1834) (junior subjective synonym)
- Acrosterigma dupuchense (Reeve, 1845): synonym of Vasticardium flavum dupuchense (Reeve, 1845): synonym of Vasticardium dupuchense (Reeve, 1845) (superseded combination)
- Acrosterigma elongatum (Bruguière, 1789): synonym of Vasticardium elongatum (Bruguière, 1789) (superseded combination)
- Acrosterigma fidele J. Vidal, 1992: synonym of Vasticardium fidele (J. Vidal, 1992) (superseded combination, original combination)
- Acrosterigma flavum (Linnaeus, 1758): synonym of Vasticardium flavum (Linnaeus, 1758) (superseded combination)
- Acrosterigma kengaluorum Voskuil & Onverwagt, 1993: synonym of Vasticardium kengaluorum (Voskuil & Onverwagt, 1993) (superseded combination, original combination)
- Acrosterigma lacunosum (Reeve, 1845): synonym of Vasticardium assimile lacunosum (Reeve, 1845) (superseded combination)
- Acrosterigma lomboke (J. Vidal, 2003): synonym of Vasticardium lomboke J. Vidal, 2003: synonym of Cardium mindanense Reeve, 1844: synonym of Vasticardium mindanense (Reeve, 1844)
- Acrosterigma mendanaense (G. B. Sowerby III, 1897): synonym of Vasticardium mendanaense (G. B. Sowerby III, 1897) (superseded combination)
- Acrosterigma punctolineata Healy & Lamprell, 1992: synonym of Acrosterigma punctolineatum Healy & Lamprell, 1992 (incorrect gender agreement of specific epithet with neuter genus name)
- Acrosterigma reeveanum (Dunker, 1852): synonym of Vasticardium vertebratum (Jonas, 1844) ( junior subjective synonym)
- Acrosterigma rosemariensis B. R. Wilson & Stevenson, 1977: synonym of Acrosterigma impolitum (G. B. Sowerby II, 1834) (junior subjective synonym)
- Acrosterigma rugosa (Lamarck, 1819): synonym of Vasticardium pectiniforme (Born, 1780) (junior subjective synonym)
- Acrosterigma sowerbyorum Voskuil & Onverwagt, 1993: synonym of Vasticardium fultoni (G. B. Sowerby III, 1916) (junior subjective synonym, replacement name for Cardium ornatum G.B. Sowerby III, 1877)
- Acrosterigma subassimile (J. Vidal, 2003): synonym of Vasticardium subassimile J. Vidal, 2003
- Acrosterigma subrugosa (G. B. Sowerby II, 1839): synonym of Vasticardium flavum subrugosum (G. B. Sowerby II, 1839): synonym of Vasticardium subrugosum (G. B. Sowerby II, 1839)
- Acrosterigma swanae (S. J. Maxwell, Congdon & Rymer, 2016): synonym of Cardium variegatum G. B. Sowerby II, 1840: synonym of Acrosterigma variegatum (G. B. Sowerby II, 1840)
- Acrosterigma unicolor (G. B. Sowerby II, 1834): synonym of Cardium simplex Spengler, 1799: synonym of Acrosterigma simplex (Spengler, 1799) (junior subjective synonym)
- Acrosterigma vlamingi B. R. Wilson & Stevenson, 1977: synonym of Acrosterigma impolitum (G. B. Sowerby II, 1834) (junior subjective synonym)
