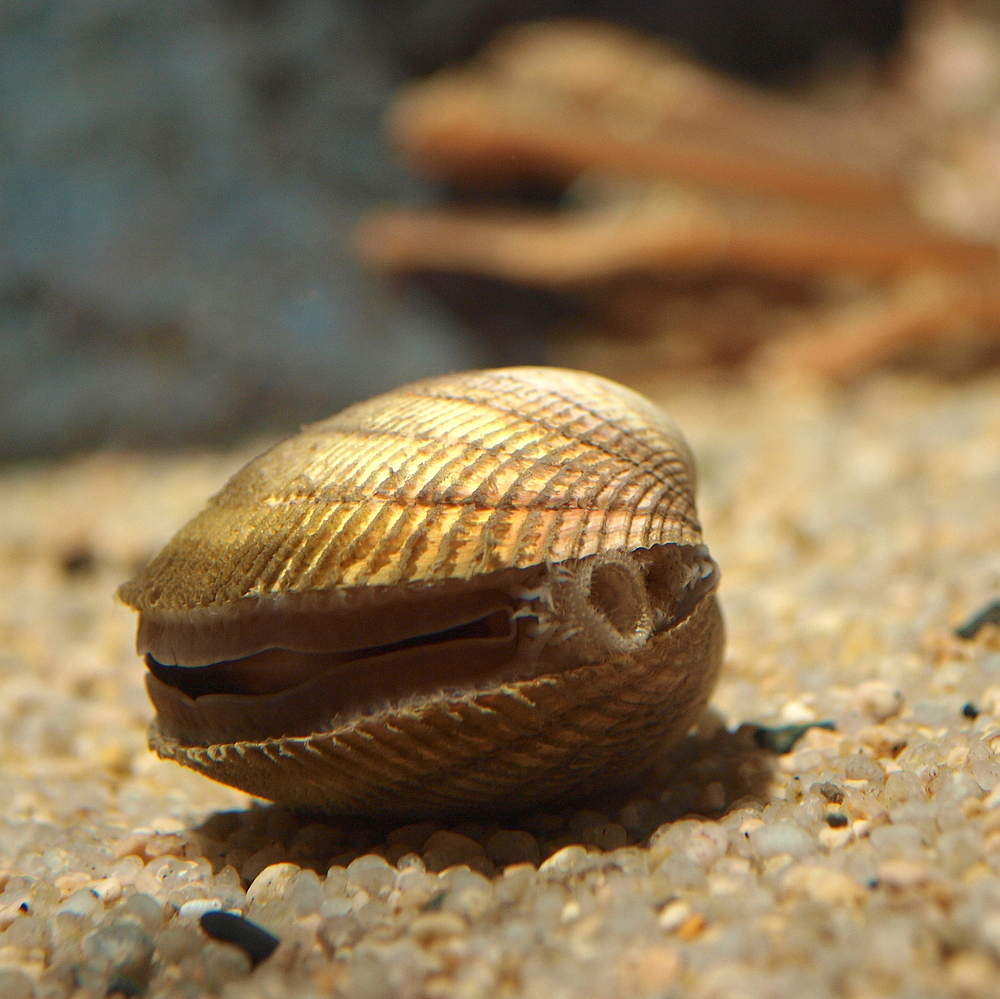
- Fulvia mutica

Scientific classification
- Kingdom: Animalia
- Phylum: Mollusca
- Class: Bivalvia
- Order: Cardiida
- Superfamily: Cardioidea
- Family: Cardiidae
- Genus: Fulvia; Gray, 1853

Species
- See text

Synonyms
- Cardium (Fulvia) Gray, 1853; Fulvia (Fulvia) Gray, 1853· accepted, alternate representation; Fulvia (Laevifulvia) Vidal, 1994

= Fulvia (bivalve) =

Genus of bivalves

Fulvia is a genus of cockles, marine bivalve molluscs in the family Cardiidae. Most species are found in the Indo-Pacific and in Australian waters.

== Species ==
The genus includes the following species according to the World Register of Marine Species:

- Subgenus Fulvia
  - Fulvia aperta (Bruguière, 1789)
  - Fulvia australis (G.B. Sowerby II, 1834)
  - Fulvia boholensis Vidal, 1994
  - Fulvia colorata Vidal & Kirkendale, 2007
  - Fulvia dulcis (Deshayes, 1863)
  - Fulvia fragiformis Vidal, 1994
  - Fulvia fragilis (Forsskål in Niebuhr, 1775)
  - Fulvia kaarei ter Poorten & Hylleberg, 2017
  - Fulvia laevigata (Linnaeus, 1758)
  - Fulvia mutica (Reeve, 1844)
  - Fulvia natalensis (Krauss, 1848)
  - Fulvia nienkeae ter Poorten, 2012
  - Fulvia scalata Vidal, 1994
  - Fulvia tenuicostata (Lamarck, 1819)
- Subgenus Laevifulvia
  - Fulvia hungerfordi (G.B. Sowerby III, 1901)
  - Fulvia lineonotata Vidal, 1994
  - Fulvia subquadrata Vidal & Kirkendale, 2007
  - Fulvia undatopicta (Pilsbry, 1904)
- Synonyms:
  - Fulvia vepris Vidal & Kirkendale, 2007: synonym of Europicardium vepris (Vidal & Kirkendale, 2007)
  - Fulvia papyracea (Bruguière, 1789): synonym of Fulvia laevigata (Linnaeus, 1758)
