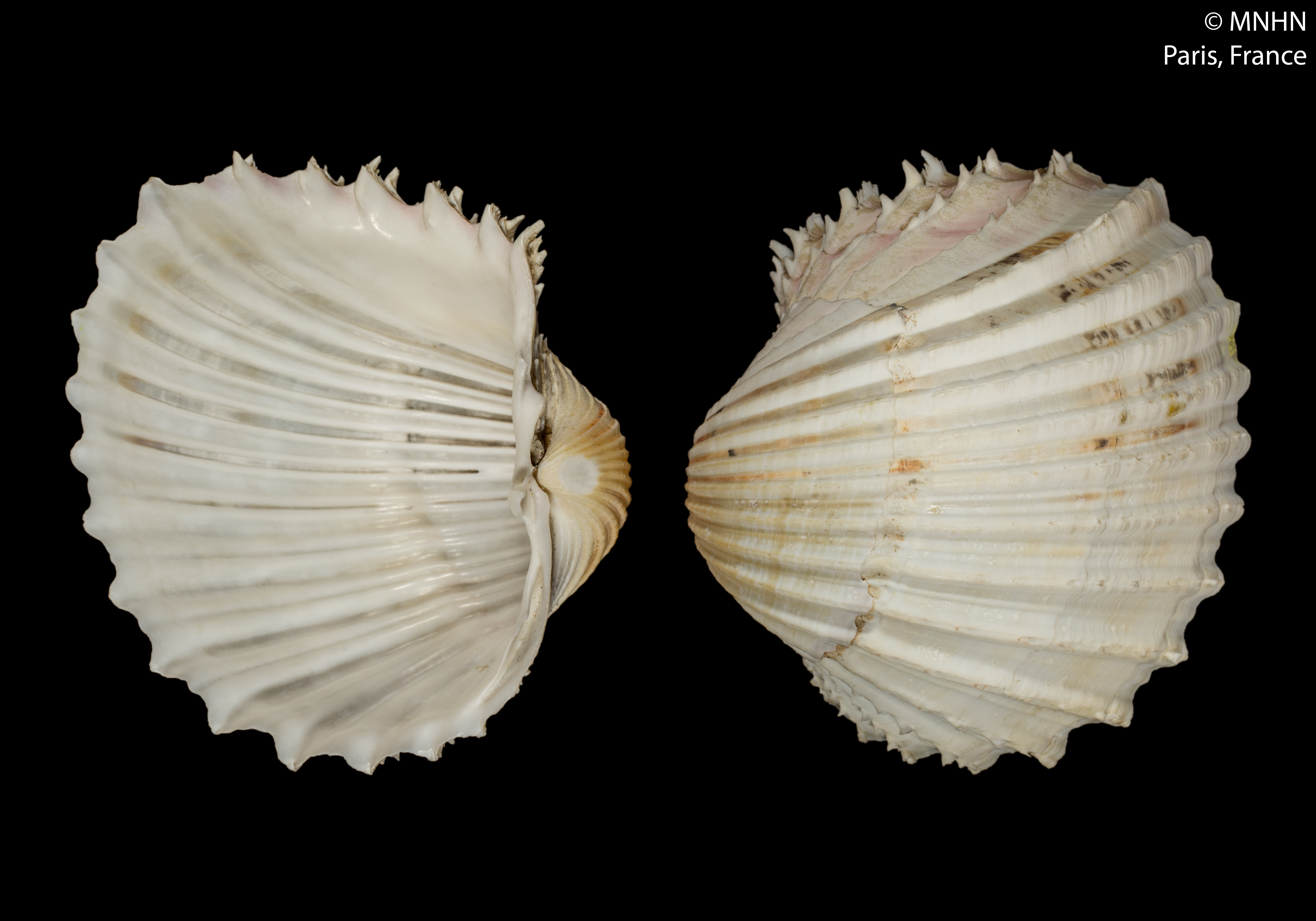
- Shell of Procardium indicum (holotype at MNHN, Paris)

Scientific classification
- Kingdom: Animalia
- Phylum: Mollusca
- Class: Bivalvia
- Order: Cardiida
- Superfamily: Cardioidea
- Family: Cardiidae
- Genus: Procardium ter Poorten & La Perna, 2017

Type species
- Cardium indicum Lamarck, 1819

= Procardium =

Genus of molluscs

Procardium is a genus of bivalves belonging to the subfamily Cardiinae of the family Cardiidae.

== Species ==
- † Procardium avisanense (Fontannes, 1879)
- † Procardium danubianum (Mayer, 1866)
- † Procardium diluvianum (Lamarck, 1819)
- Procardium indicum (Lamarck, 1819)
- † Procardium jansseni ter Poorten & La Perna, 2017
- † Procardium kunstleri (Cossmann & Peyrot, 1912)
- † Procardium magnei ter Poorten & La Perna, 2017
