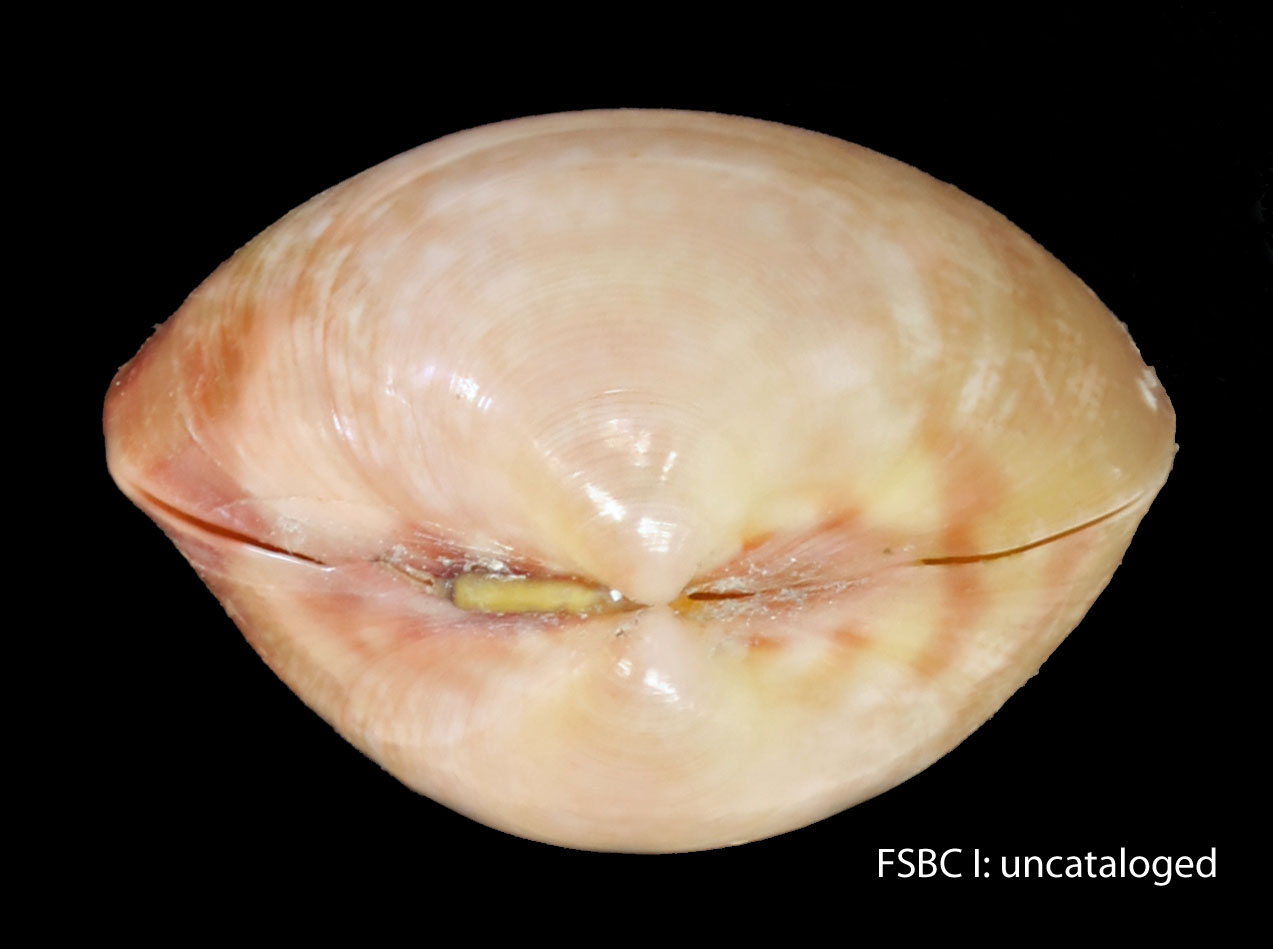

Scientific classification
- Kingdom: Animalia
- Phylum: Mollusca
- Class: Bivalvia
- Order: Cardiida
- Family: Cardiidae
- Genus: Laevicardium
- Species: L. pictum

Binomial name
- Laevicardium pictum (Ravenel, 1861)

= Laevicardium pictum =

Species of bivalve

Laevicardium pictum, or Ravenel's egg cockle, is a species of bivalve mollusc in the family Cardiidae. It can be found along the Atlantic coast of North America, ranging from Florida to the West Indies.
