= Americardia media =

Scientific classification
- Kingdom: Animalia
- Phylum: Mollusca
- Class: Bivalvia
- Order: Cardiida
- Family: Cardiidae
- Genus: Americardia
- Species: A. media

Binomial name
- Americardia media (Linnaeus, 1758)

Species of bivalve

Americardia media, the Atlantic strawberry cockle, is a species of saltwater clam, a marine bivalve mollusc in the family Cardiidae, the cockles. This species can be found along the Atlantic coast of North America, from Cape Hatteras to the West Indies.
