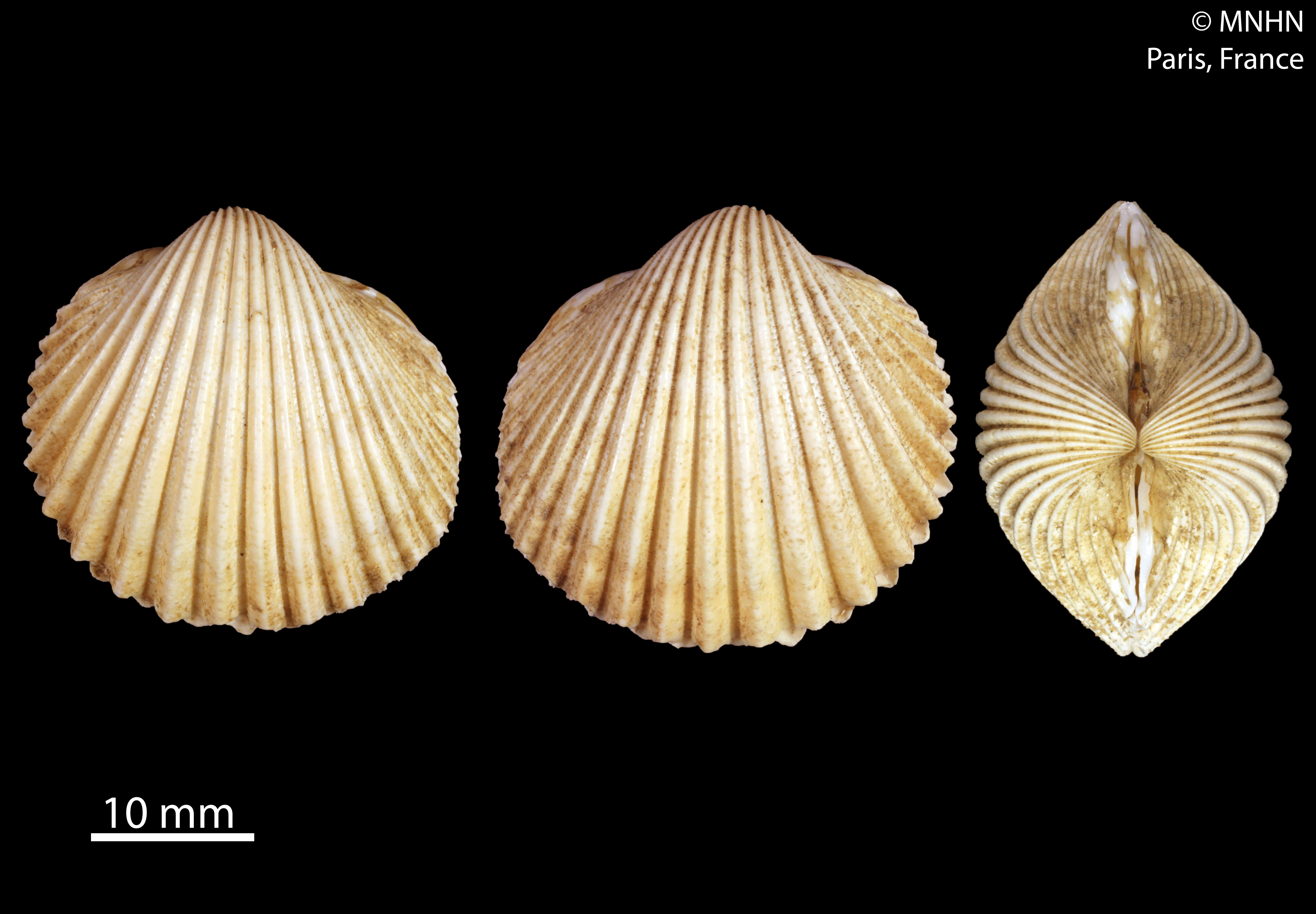
- shell of Vepricardium eichhorsti (paratype at MNHN, Paris)

Scientific classification
- Kingdom: Animalia
- Phylum: Mollusca
- Class: Bivalvia
- Order: Cardiida
- Superfamily: Cardioidea
- Family: Cardiidae
- Genus: Vepricardium; Iredale, 1929

Type species
- Vepricardium pulchricostatum Iredale, 1929

Synonyms
- Pectunculus Mörch, 1853 (invalid: non Lamarck, 1799 nec da Costa, 1778)

= Vepricardium =

Genus of bivalves

Vepricardium is a genus of large saltwater clams, marine bivalve molluscs in the subfamily Cardiinae of the family Cardiidae, the giant clams.

== Species ==
- Vepricardium asiaticum (Bruguière, 1789)
- Vepricardium burnupi (G. B. Sowerby III, 1897)
- Vepricardium coronatum (Schröter, 1786)
- Vepricardium eichhorsti Thach, 2015
- Vepricardium incarnatum (Reeve, 1844)
- Vepricardium multispinosum (G. B. Sowerby II, 1839)
- † Vepricardium orbiculare Schafhäutl
- Vepricardium rubrohamatum Voskuil & Onverwagt, 1988
- Vepricardium sinense (G. B. Sowerby II, 1839)
- Vepricardium vidali ter Poorten & H. Dekker, 2002

Synonyms

- Vepricardium albohamatum Hylleberg, 2000: synonym of Vepricardium rubrohamatum Voskuil & Onverwagt, 1988 (dubious synonym)
- Vepricardium leve (Anton, 1938): synonym of Vepricardium multispinosum (G. B. Sowerby II, 1839) (based on nomen oblitum)
- Vepricardium pulchricostatum Iredale, 1929: synonym of Vepricardium multispinosum (G. B. Sowerby II, 1839) (junior subjective synonym)
