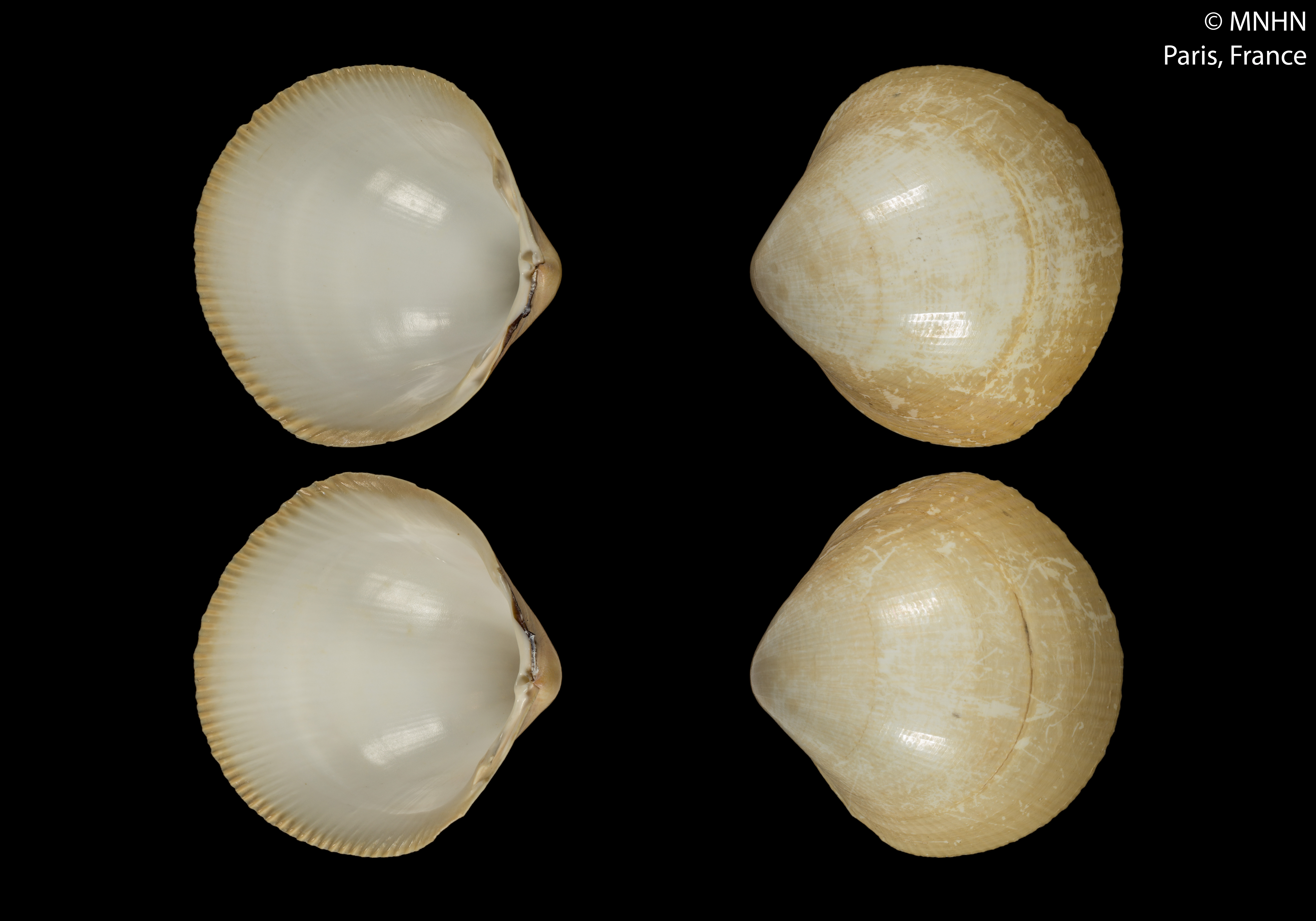
- Shell of Laevicardium elatum (holotype at MNHN, Paris)

Scientific classification
- Kingdom: Animalia
- Phylum: Mollusca
- Class: Bivalvia
- Order: Cardiida
- Family: Cardiidae
- Genus: Laevicardium
- Species: L. elatum

Binomial name
- Laevicardium elatum (Sowerby, 1833)

= Laevicardium elatum =

Species of bivalve

Laevicardium elatum, the Giant egg cockle, Giant Pacific cockle or the Yellow cardinal cockle, is a species of saltwater clam, a cockle, a marine bivalve mollusc in the family Cardiidae, the cockles. This species is found in the tropical Panamic Province, from Southern California south through the Pacific coast of Mexico and the Gulf of California, and as far south as Panama.

== Description ==
Shell size 120-130 mm.

== Distribution ==
Eastern Pacific Ocean: West coast of Mexico: sandy areas in shallow water.
