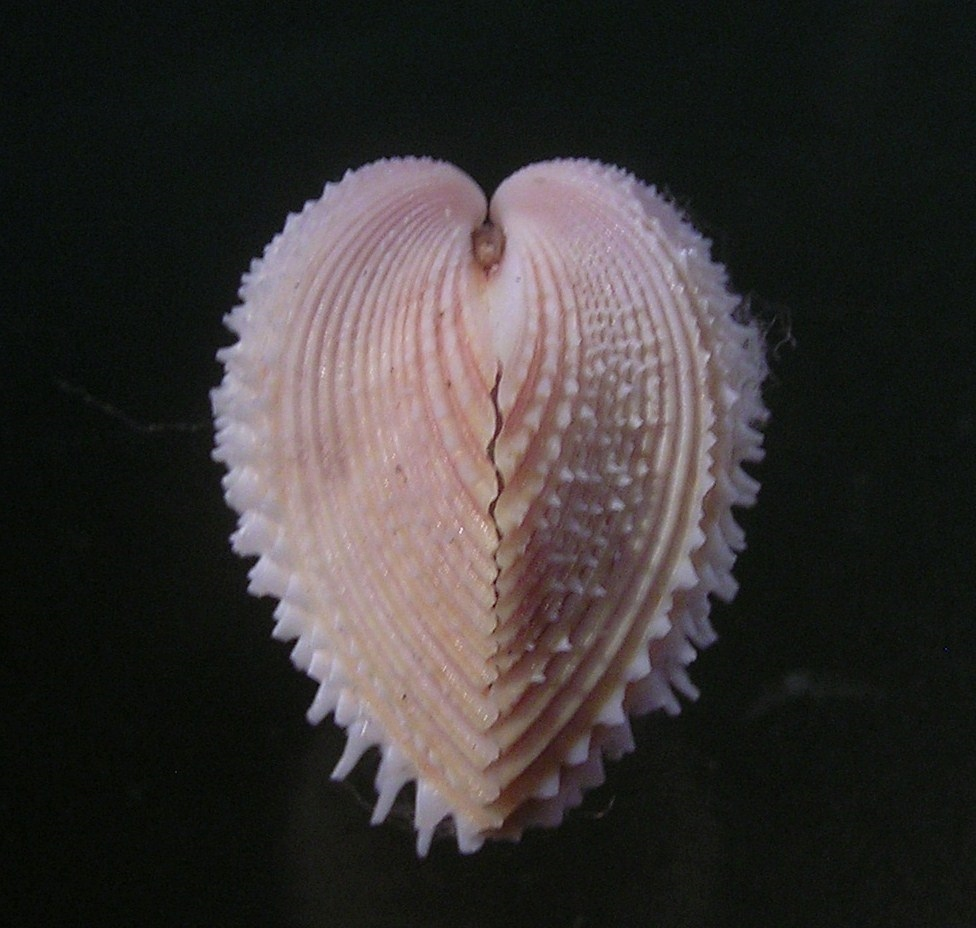
- Ctenocardia virgo

Scientific classification
- Kingdom: Animalia
- Phylum: Mollusca
- Class: Bivalvia
- Order: Cardiida
- Family: Cardiidae
- Genus: Ctenocardia; H. Adams & A. Adams, 1857

Type species
- Cardium hystrix Reeve, 1844

= Ctenocardia =

Genus of bivalves

Ctenocardia is a genus of bivalves within the family Cardiidae. There are currently 6 species assigned to the genus.

== Species ==
- Ctenocardia fijianum J. Vidal & Kirkendale, 2007
- Ctenocardia fornicata (G. B. Sowerby II, 1840)
- Ctenocardia gustavi J. Vidal & Kirkendale, 2007
- Ctenocardia pilbaraensis ter Poorten & Kirkendale, 2017
- Ctenocardia translata (Prashad, 1932)
- Ctenocardia virgo (Reeve, 1845)
