= Americardia =

Scientific classification
- Kingdom: Animalia
- Phylum: Mollusca
- Class: Bivalvia
- Order: Cardiida
- Family: Cardiidae
- Genus: Americardia; Stewart, 1930

Genus of bivalves

Americardia is a genus of saltwater clams, marine bivalve molluscs in the family Cardiidae, the cockles.

== Species ==
Species within the genus Americardia include:

- Americardia media (Linnaeus, 1758) — Atlantic strawberry cockle
