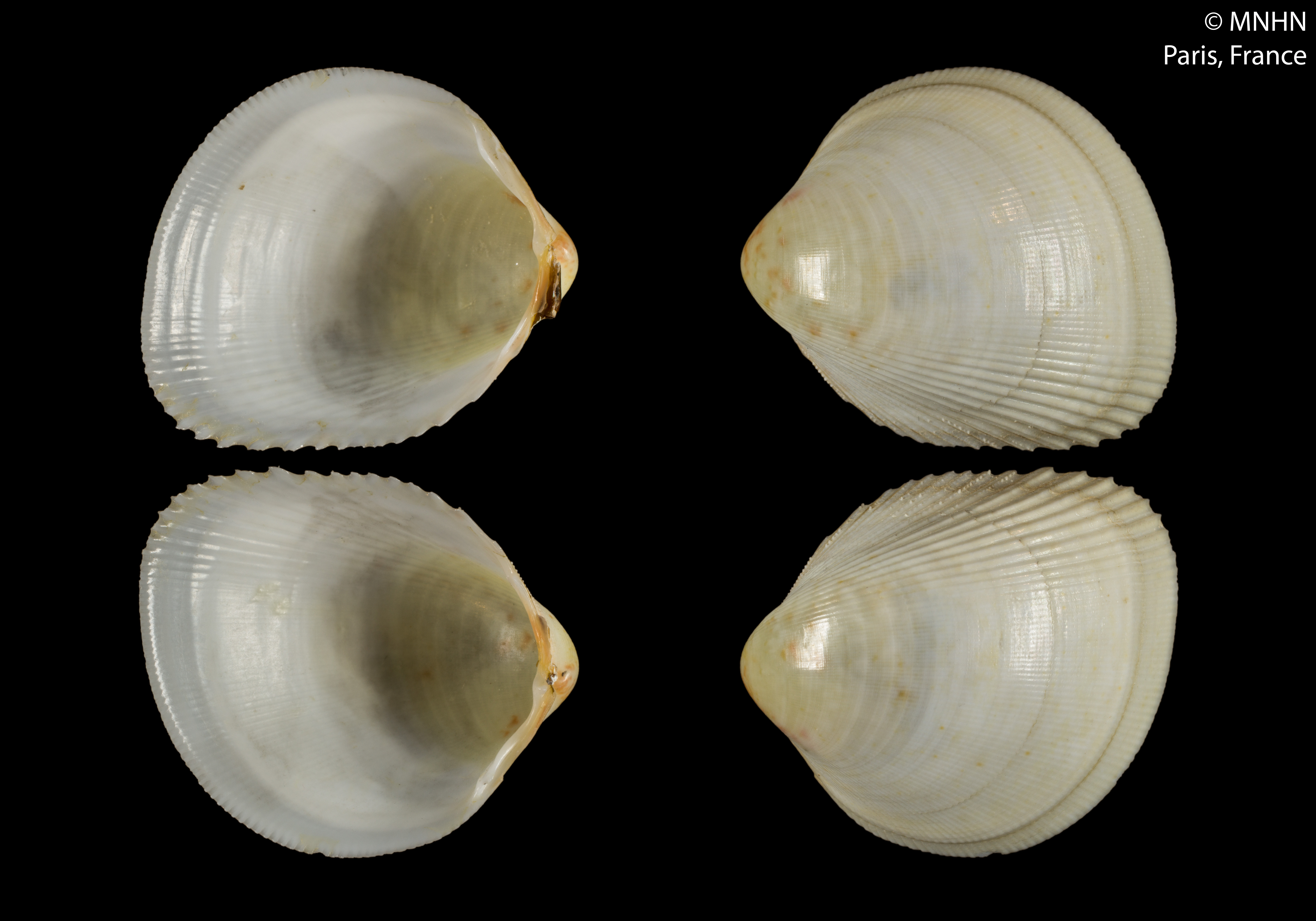
- Shell of Pseudofulvia arago (holotype at MNHN, Paris)

Scientific classification
- Kingdom: Animalia
- Phylum: Mollusca
- Class: Bivalvia
- Order: Cardiida
- Family: Cardiidae
- Genus: Pseudofulvia; Vidal & Kirkendale, 2007

Type species
- Pseudofulvia caledonica Vidal & Kirkendale, 2007

= Pseudofulvia =

Extinct genus of bivalves

Pseudofulvia is a genus of saltwater clams, marine bivalve mollusks in the subfamily Laevicardiinae of the family Cardiidae, the cockles.

== Species ==
- Pseudofulvia arago Vidal & Kirkendale, 2007
- Pseudofulvia caledonica Vidal & Kirkendale, 2007
