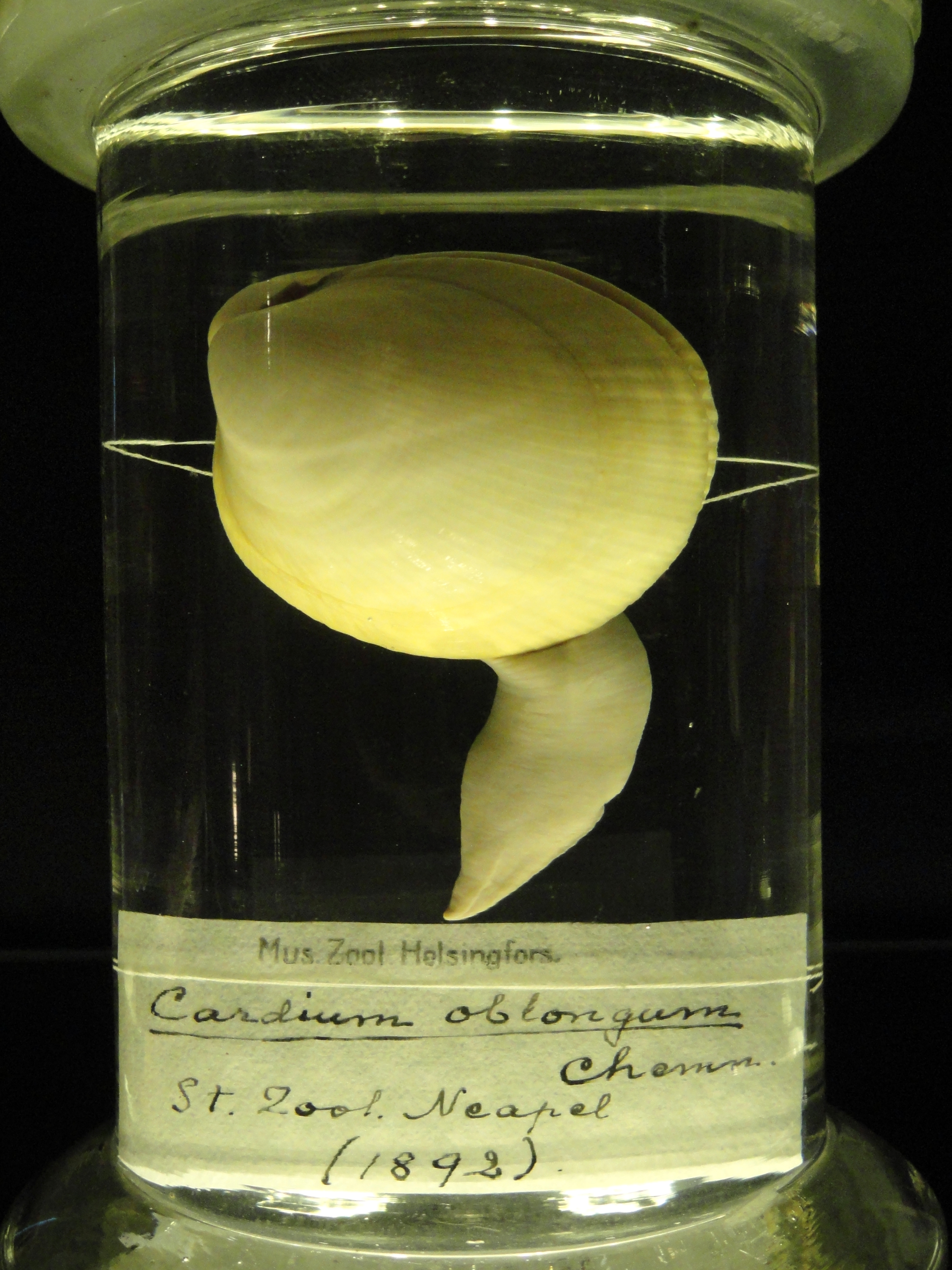
- A whole preserved specimen of Laevicardium oblongum

Scientific classification
- Kingdom: Animalia
- Phylum: Mollusca
- Class: Bivalvia
- Order: Cardiida
- Family: Cardiidae
- Genus: Laevicardium; Swainson, 1840

= Laevicardium =

Genus of molluscs

Laevicardium, common named egg cockles, is a genus of saltwater clams or cockles, marine bivalve molluscs in the family Cardiidae, the cockles. They are unusual among the cockles in that they have smooth, rounded, egg-shaped valves.

== Species ==
There are 33 species in Laevicardium:

- Laevicardium attenuatum
- Laevicardium biradiatum
- Laevicardium brasilianum
- Laevicardium castaneum
- Laevicardium clarionense
- Laevicardium compressum
- Laevicardium crassum (Gmelin, 1791) — Norwegian egg cockle
- Laevicardium decorticatum
- Laevicardium elatum (Sowerby, 1833) — Giant egg cockle
- Laevicardium eliodelfabroi Cossignani, 2024
- Laevicardium etheringtoni
- Laevicardium gorgasi
- Laevicardium laevigatum (Linnaeus, 1758) — egg cockle
- Laevicardium leptorimum
- Laevicardium lobulatum
- Laevicardium lyratum
- Laevicardium mortoni (Conrad, 1830) — Morton's egg cockle
- Laevicardium multipunctatum
- Laevicardium nemo
- Laevicardium nemocardiforme
- Laevicardium oblongum
- Laevicardium parisiense
- Laevicardium parkinsoni
- Laevicardium pedernalense
- Laevicardium pictum (Ravenel, 1861) — Ravenel's egg cockle
- Laevicardium pristis
- Laevicardium rudentis
- Laevicardium serratum
- Laevicardium substriatum
- Laevicardium sybariticum (Dall, 1886) — Dall's egg cockle
- Laevicardium tegalense
- Laevicardium tenuisulcatum
- Laevicardium tertium
- Laevicardium tristiculum
- Laevicardium venustulum
