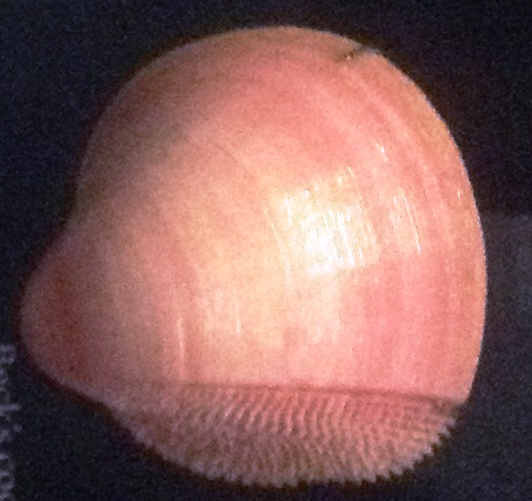
- Cardium beckei

Scientific classification
- Kingdom: Animalia
- Phylum: Mollusca
- Class: Bivalvia
- Order: Cardiida
- Family: Cardiidae
- Genus: Nemocardium; Meek, 1876

= Nemocardium =

Genus of molluscs

Nemocardium is a genus of bivalves belonging to the family Cardiidae.

The genus has almost cosmopolitan distribution.

Species:

- Nemocardium australojaponicum ter Poorten, 2013
- Nemocardium bechei (Reeve, 1847)
- Nemocardium carteri P.A.Maxwell, 1992
- Nemocardium cooperii (Gabb, 1864)
- Nemocardium diversa Conrad, 1848
- Nemocardium enigmaticum ter Poorten, 2013
- Nemocardium eugenense (Clark, 1925)
- Nemocardium fulvum ter Poorten, 2013
- Nemocardium granosulcatum Traub, 1938
- Nemocardium hadraterum Woodring, 1982
- Nemocardium jamaicense Dall, 1903
- Nemocardium lene
- Nemocardium nicoletti
- Nemocardium patulum (Hutton, 1873)
- Nemocardium probatum (Iredale, 1927)
- Nemocardium salrivale
- Nemocardium semiasperum (Deshayes, 1858)
- Nemocardium serum (Hutton, 1873)
- Nemocardium textum (Bronn, 1831)
- Nemocardium toriii Nomura, 1933
- Nemocardium turgidum Solander, 1766
- Nemocardium yokoyamai (Takeda, 1953)
