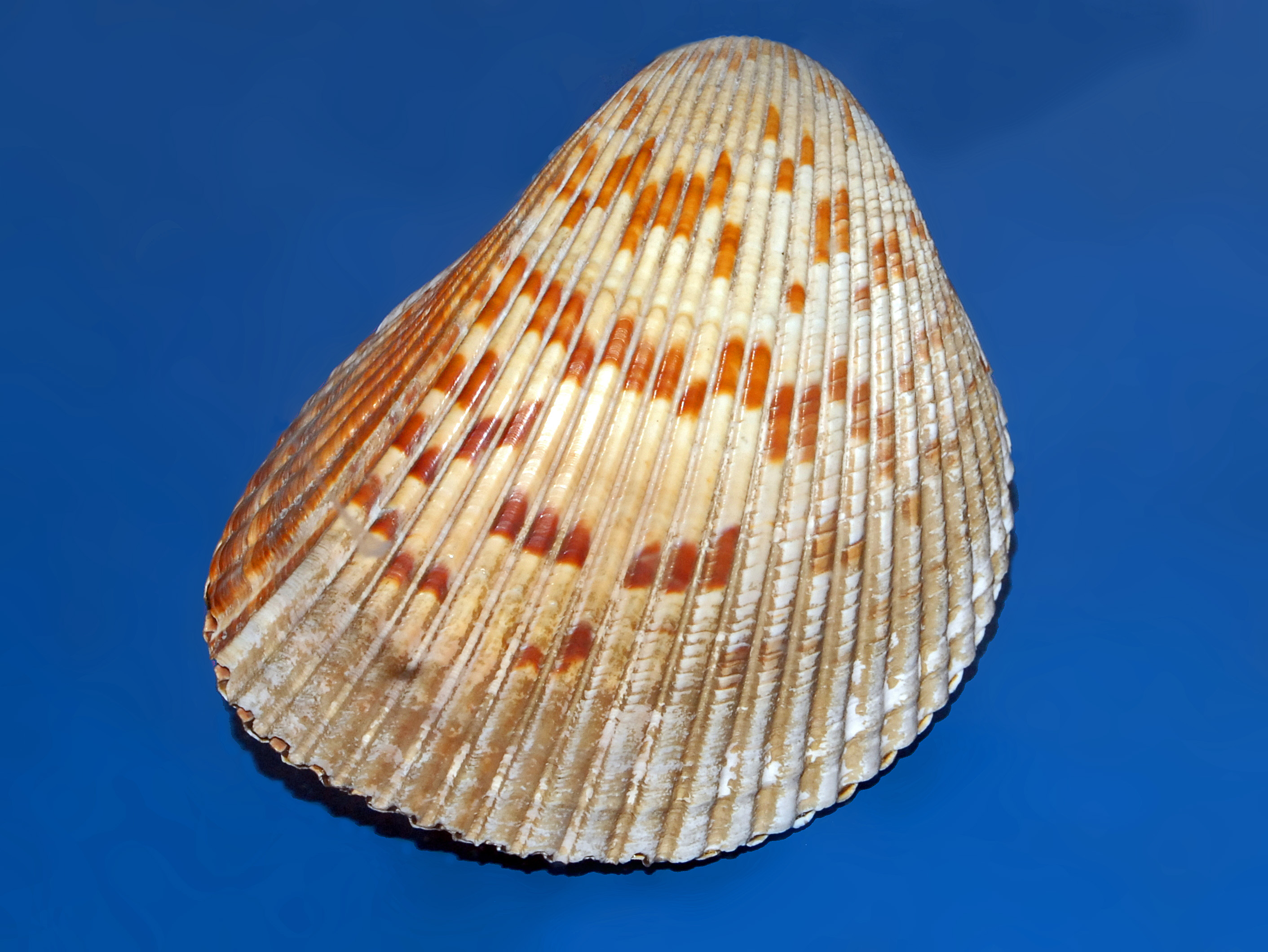
- Shell of Dinocardium robustum from Florida at the Museo Civico di Storia Naturale di Milano

Scientific classification
- Kingdom: Animalia
- Phylum: Mollusca
- Class: Bivalvia
- Order: Cardiida
- Family: Cardiidae
- Genus: Dinocardium; Dall, 1900
- Species: D. robustum

Binomial name
- Dinocardium robustum (Lightfoot, 1786)

Synonyms
- Cardium maculatum Gmelin, 1791; Cardium magnum Born, 1778 (non Linnaeus, 1758) (synonym); Cardium obliquum Spengler, 1799 (synonym); Cardium obliquum vanhyningi Clench & Smith, 1944 (synonym); Cardium robustum Lightfoot, 1786; Cardium ventricosum Bruguière, 1789 (synonym); Dinocardium robustum vanhyningi Clench & Smith, 1944

= Dinocardium =

Genus of bivalves

Dinocardium is a genus of large saltwater clams or cockles, marine bivalve molluscs in the family Cardiidae, the cockles. There is only one species in the genus, Dinocardium robustum, or the Atlantic giant cockle.

== Description ==
Dinocardium robustum has a shell that reaches a length of 100–125 mm. This large and sturdy shell is obliquely ovate, with crenulate margins and about 32–36 rounded radial ribs present on both the inside and the outside. The valves are symmetrical with one another (equivalve). The basic color of the surface usually is creamy white, mottled with reddish-brown markings, while the interior is pinkish. This cockle burrows into the substrate by means of its strong foot, and like most bivalves feeds by filtering the water for plankton.

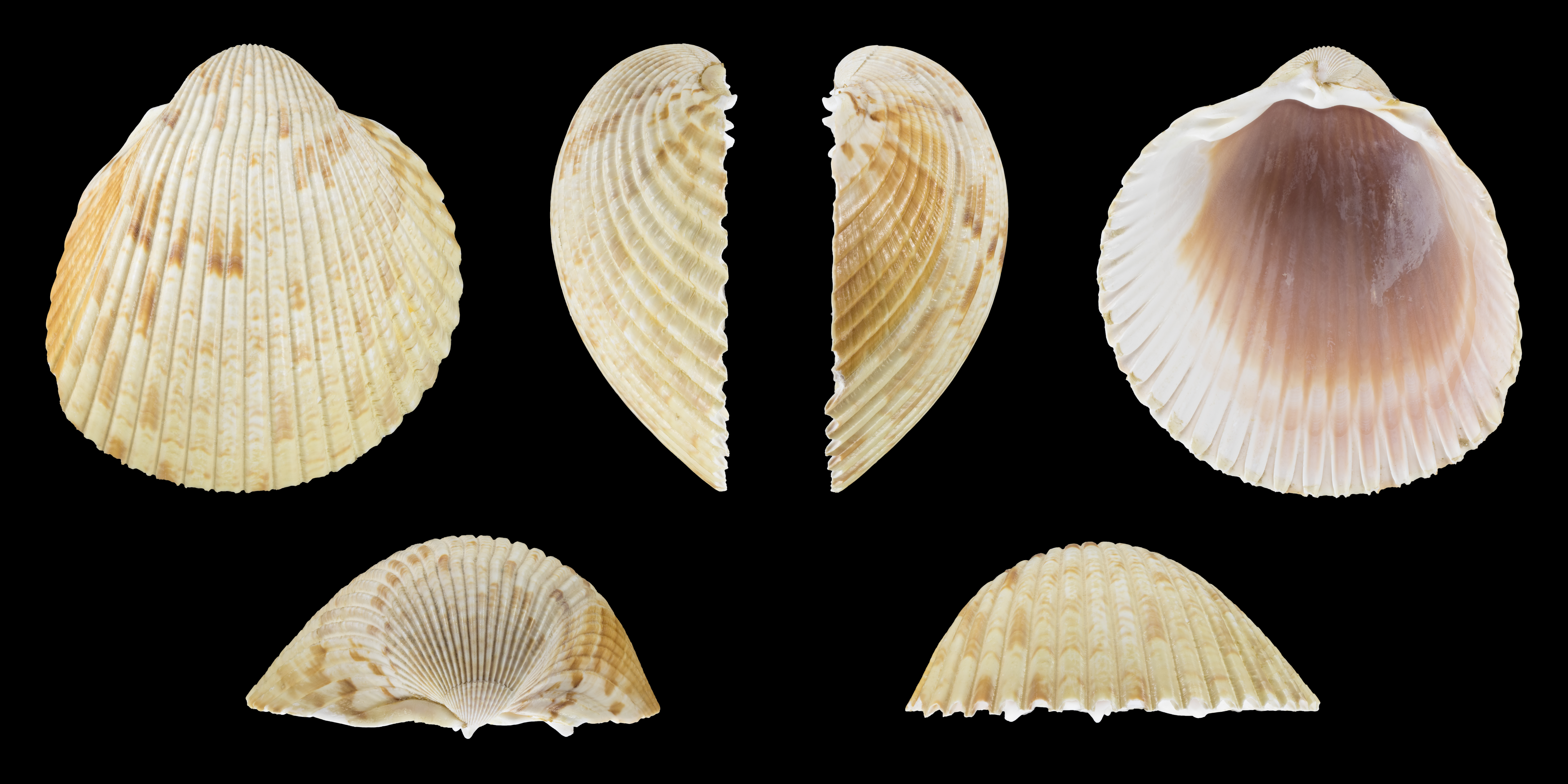
Dinocardium robustum
Right valve

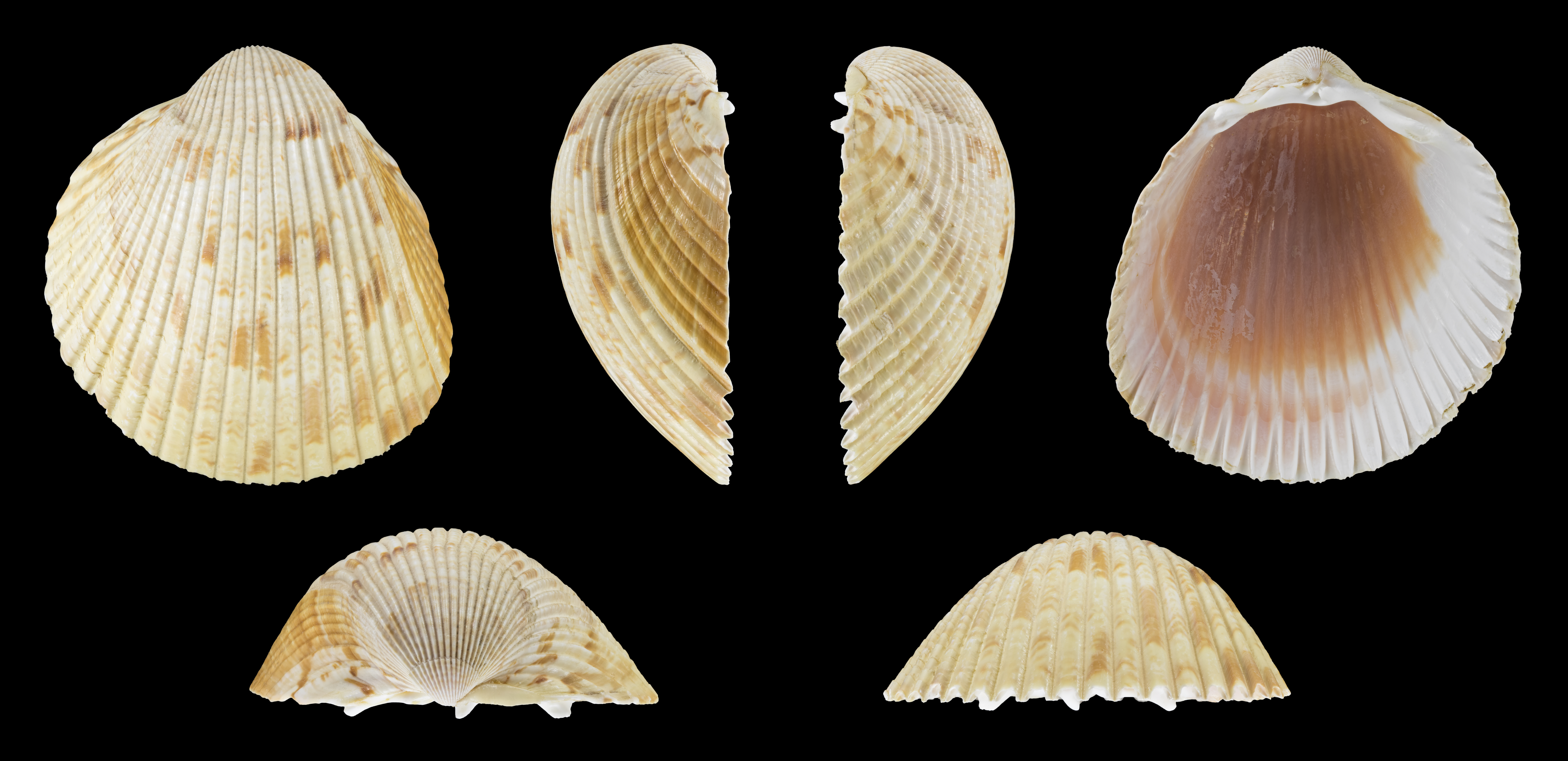
Dinocardium robustum
Left valve
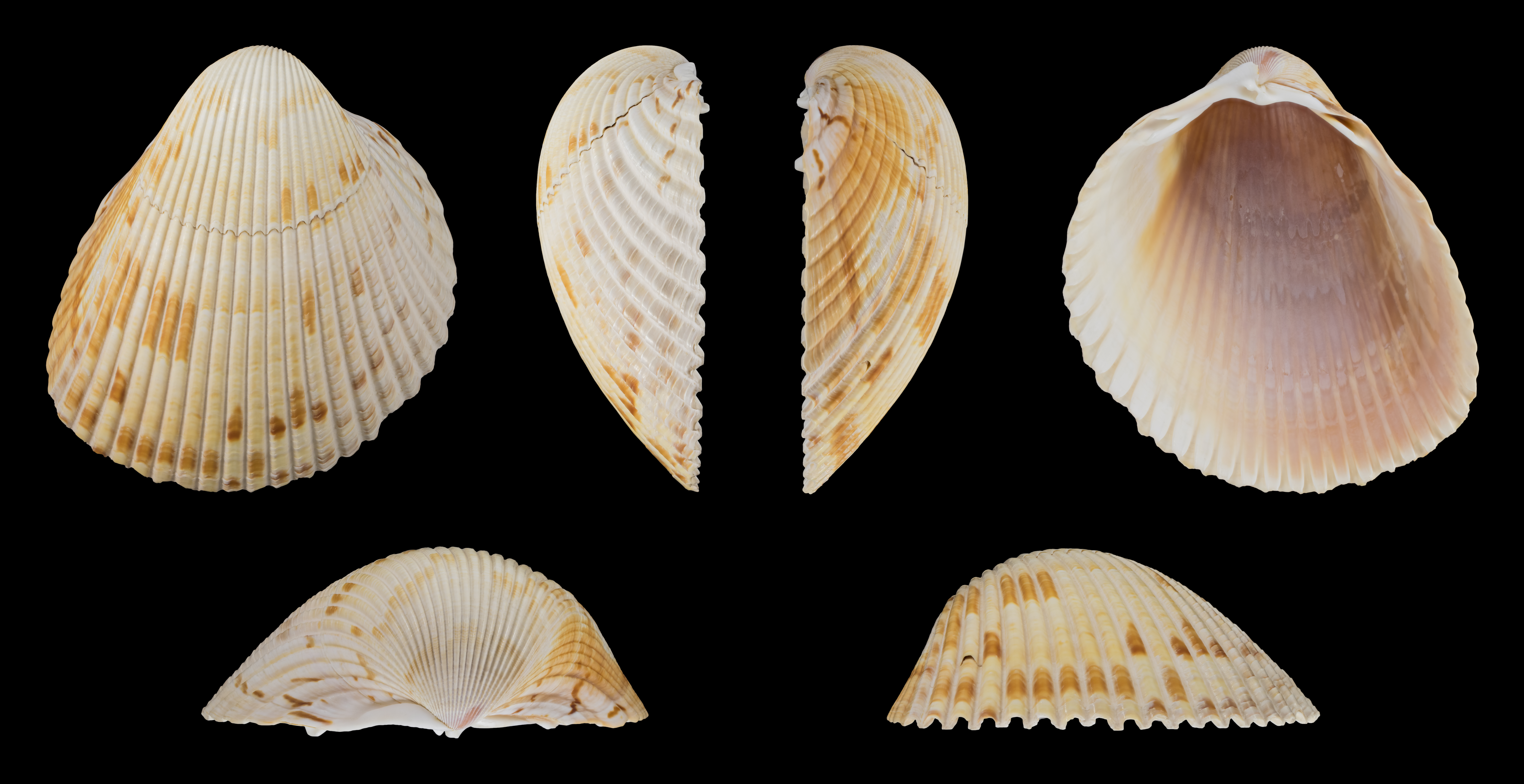
Dinocardium robustum vanhyningi
Right valve

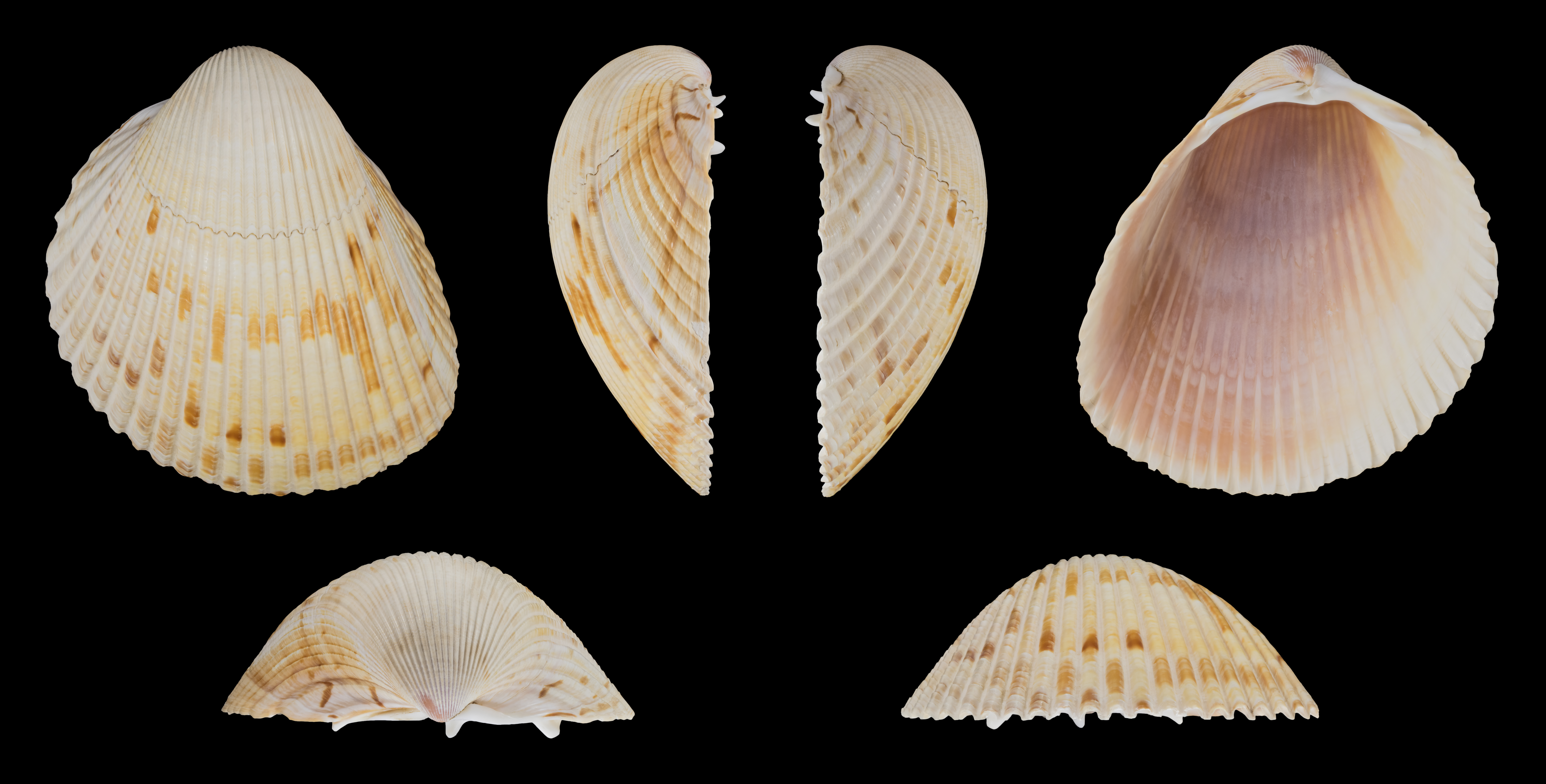
Dinocardium robustum vanhyningi
Left valve

== Distribution ==
This species can be found along the western Atlantic coast of North America, in the Gulf of Mexico and in the Caribbean Sea.
