= Papyridea =

Scientific classification
- Kingdom: Animalia
- Phylum: Mollusca
- Class: Bivalvia
- Order: Cardiida
- Family: Cardiidae
- Genus: Papyridea; Swainson, 1840

Genus of bivalves

Papyridea is a genus of molluscs in the family Cardiidae.

== Species ==
- Papyridea aspersa (G. B. Sowerby I, 1833)
- Papyridea crockeri (A. M. Strong & Hertlein, 1937)
- Papyridea hiulca (Reeve, 1845)
- Papyridea lata (Born, 1778)
- Papyridea semisulcata (J.E. Gray, 1825)
- Papyridea soleniformis (Bruguiere, 1789) — spiny paper cockle
