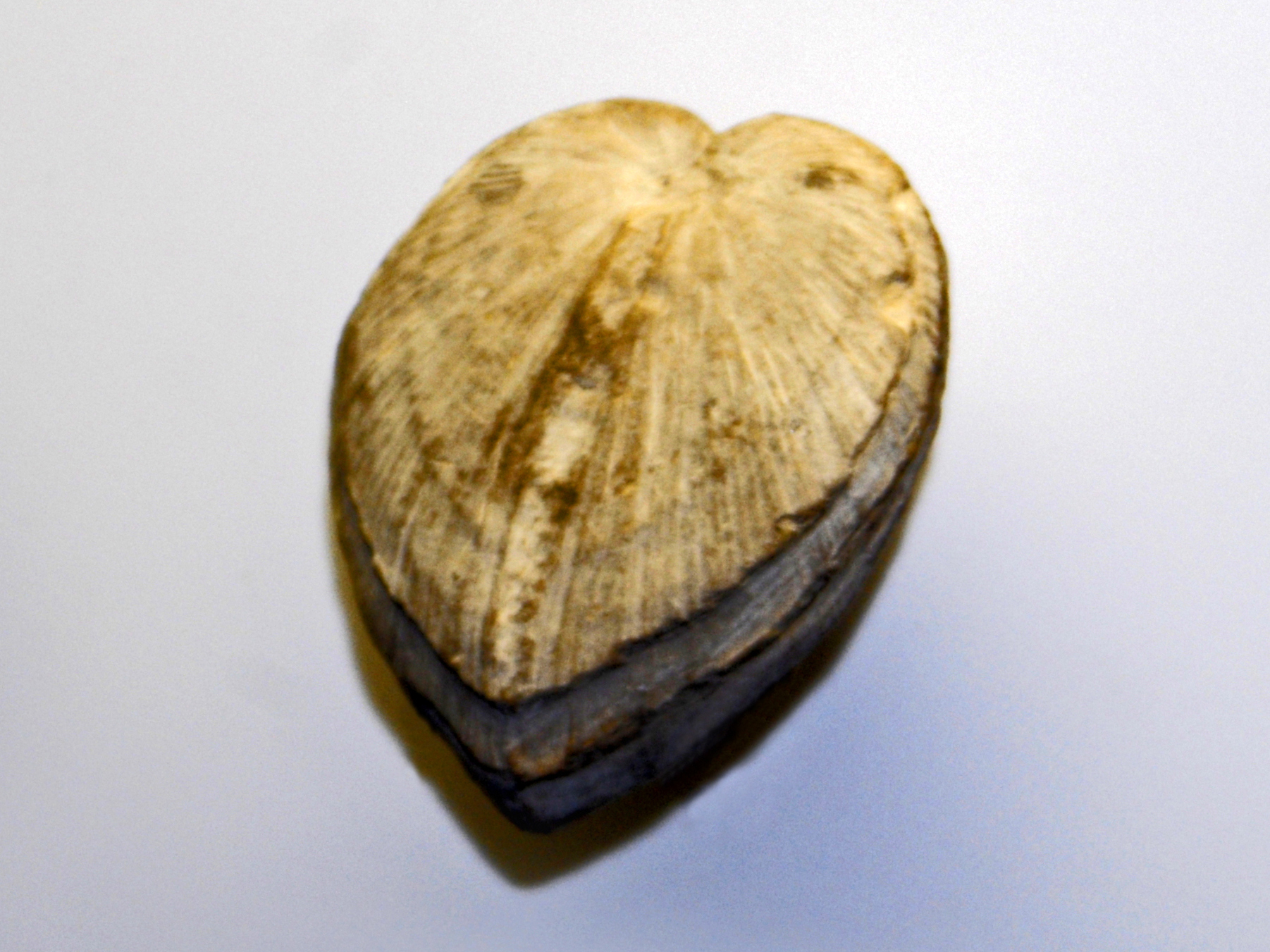
- Fossil specimen of Lunulicardia species from Italy

Scientific classification
- Kingdom: Animalia
- Phylum: Mollusca
- Class: Bivalvia
- Order: Cardiida
- Family: Cardiidae
- Genus: Lunulicardia; Gray, 1853

Synonyms
- Hemicardia Spengler, 1799

= Lunulicardia =

Genus of bivalves

Lunulicardia is a genus of saltwater clams, marine bivalve molluscs in the family Cardiidae, the cockles. Fossils species in this genus are present in the Pliocene deposits of Indonesia and the Miocene deposits of Russia.

== Species ==
Species within the genus Lunulicardia include:

- Lunulicardia hemicardium (Linnaeus, 1758)
- Lunulicardia orlini Mienis, 2009
- Lunulicardia retusa (Linnaeus, 1767)
- Lunulicardia tumorifera (Lamarck, 1819)

Species brought into synonymy

- Lunulicardia auricula (Niebuhr in Forsskål, 1775): synonym of Lunulicardia retusa auricula (Niebuhr, 1775)
- Lunulicardia hemicardia [sic]: synonym of Lunulicardia hemicardium (Linnaeus, 1758) (misspelling)
- Lunulicardia subretusa Sowerby: synonym of Lunulicardia retusa (Linnaeus, 1767)
