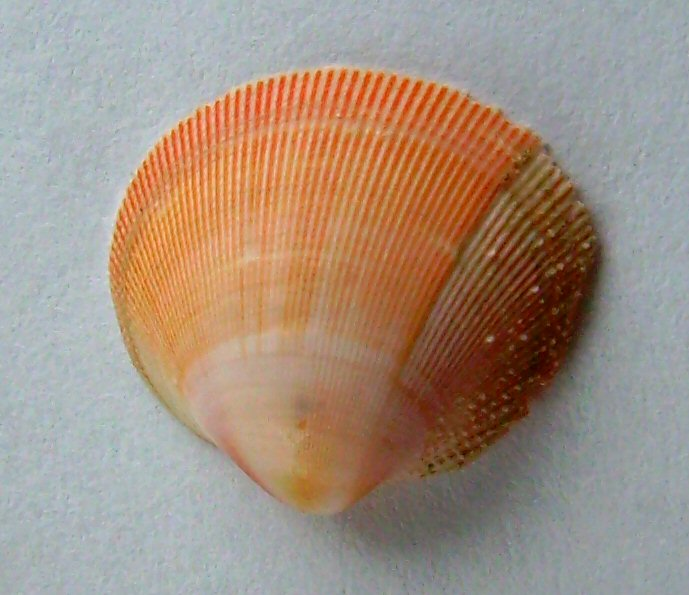
- Pratulum pulchellum

Scientific classification
- Kingdom: Animalia
- Phylum: Mollusca
- Class: Bivalvia
- Order: Cardiida
- Family: Cardiidae
- Genus: Pratulum; Iredale, 1924

Species
- See text

= Pratulum =

Pratulum Temporal range: Eocene to Recent

Genus of bivalves

Pratulum is a genus of marine bivalve molluscs in the family Cardiidae.

== Distribution ==
This genus is endemic to Australia and New Zealand.

== Species in the genus Pratulum ==
- Pratulum catinus (P. A. Maxwell, 1992) †
- Pratulum finlayi (Bartrum & Powell, 1928) †
- Pratulum marwicki (Beu & P. A. Maxwell, 1990) †
- Pratulum modicum (Marwick, 1944) †
- Pratulum occidentale Poutiers, 2017
- Pratulum pulchellum (Gray, 1843)
- Pratulum quinarium (Marwick, 1944) †
- Pratulum semitectum (Marwick, 1926) †
- Pratulum thetidis (Hedley, 1902)
