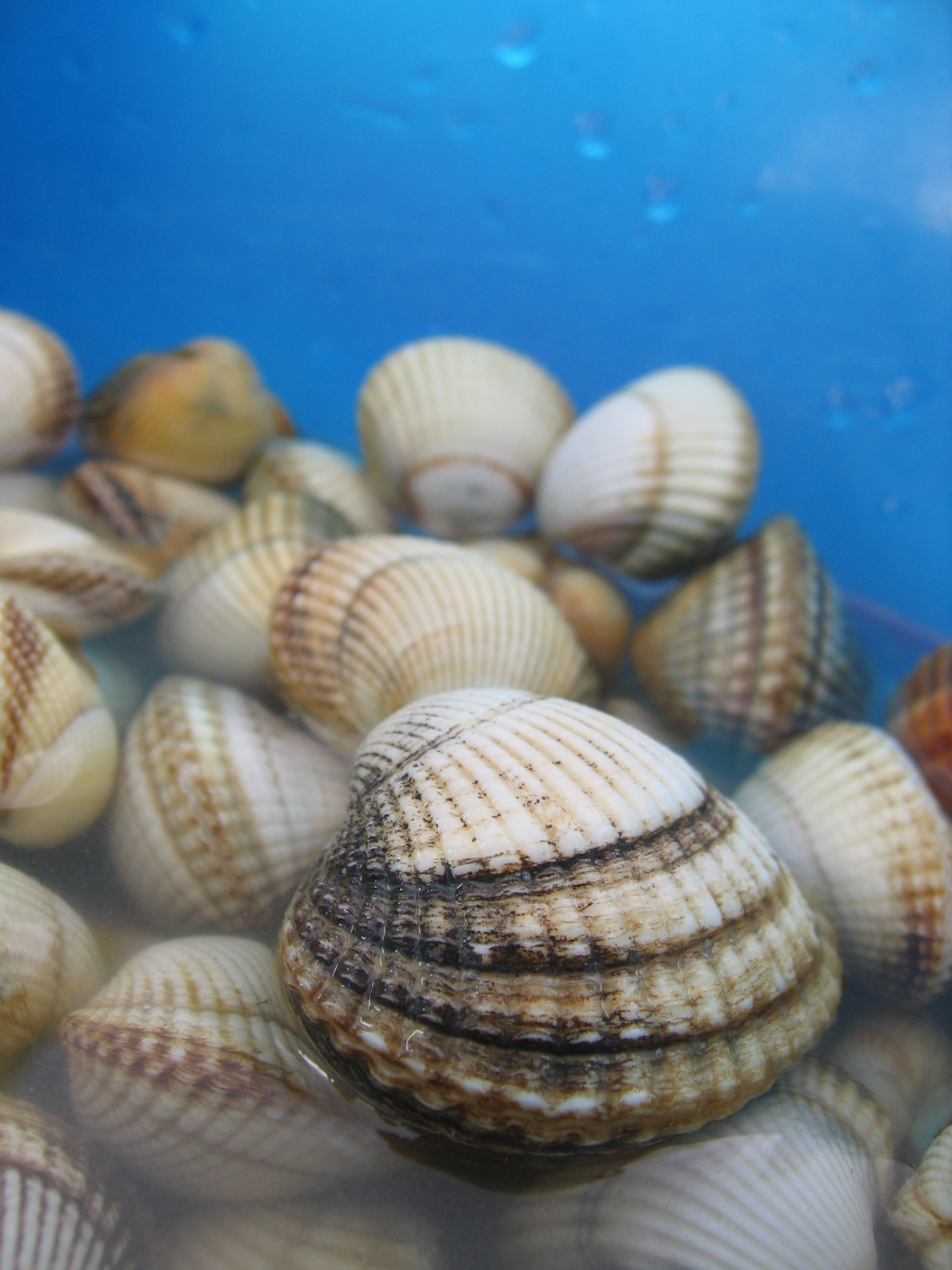
- Live specimens of Cerastoderma edule from Lingreville, France

Scientific classification
- Kingdom: Animalia
- Phylum: Mollusca
- Class: Bivalvia
- Superorder: Imparidentia
- Order: Cardiida
- Superfamily: Cardioidea; Lamarck, 1809

Families
- Cardiidae Lamarck, 1809; †Pterocardiidae Scarlato & Starobogatov, 1979

Synonyms
- Cardiacea

= Cardioidea =

Superfamily of molluscs

Cardioidea is a taxonomic superfamily of saltwater clams, marine bivalve molluscs consisting of the extant Cardiidae (cockles) and the extinct Pterocardiidae.

== Taxonomy ==
These families are assigned to Cardioidea:

The use of † indicates taxa that are extinct.

- Family: Cardiidae Lamarck, 1809
  - Subfamily Cardiinae Lamarck, 1809
  - Subfamily Clinocardiinae Kafanov, 1975
  - Subfamily Fraginae Stewart, 1930
  - Subfamily Laevicardiinae Keen, 1951
  - Subfamily †Lahilliinae Finlay & Marwick, 1937†
  - Subfamily Lymnocardiinae Stoliczka, 1870
  - Subfamily Orthocardiinae J. A. Schneider, 2002
  - Subfamily †Protocardiinae Bronn, 1849†
  - Subfamily Trachycardiinae Stewart, 1930
  - Subfamily Tridacninae Lamarck, 1819
- Family: †Pterocardiidae Scarlato & Starobogatov, 1979
  - Genus †Pterocardia Bayan, 1874
    - Species †Pterocardia alata Rollier, 1912
    - Species †Pterocardia brouzetense Cossmann, 1907
    - Species †Pterocardia cochleata (Quenstedt, 1852)
    - Species †Pterocardia corallina (Leymerie, 1845)
    - Species †Pterocardia couloni Rollier, 1912
    - Species †Pterocardia subminuta (d'Orbigny, 1850)
    - Species †Pterocardia valfinense Rollier, 1912
    - Species †Pterocardia wimmisense Rollier, 1912
