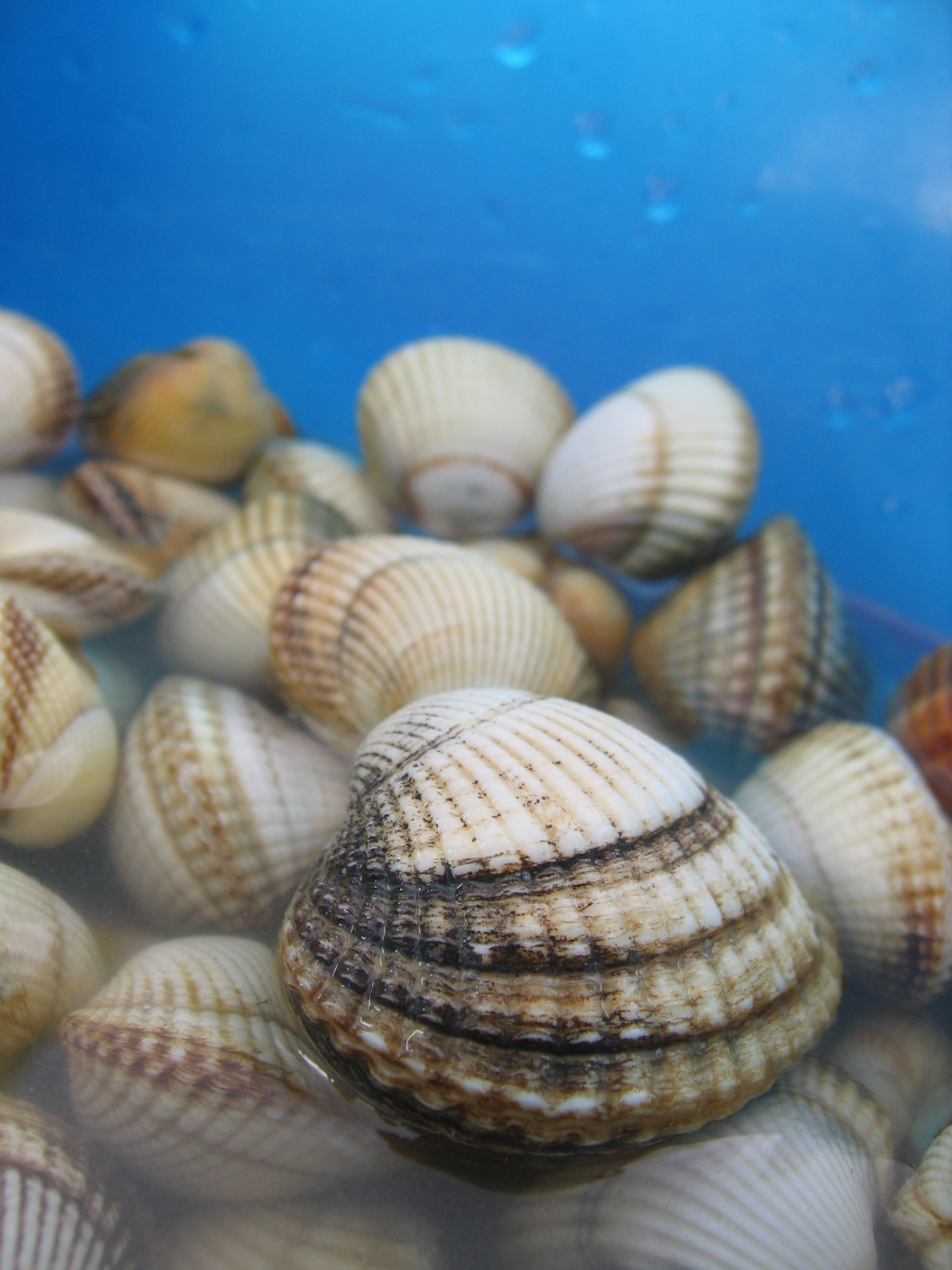
- Live specimens of Cerastoderma edule from France

Scientific classification
- Kingdom: Animalia
- Phylum: Mollusca
- Class: Bivalvia
- Order: Cardiida
- Superfamily: Cardioidea
- Family: Cardiidae; Lamarck, 1809

Subfamilies
- Cardiinae; Clinocardiinae; Fraginae; Laevicardiinae; Lahilliinae; Lymnocardiinae; Orthocardiinae; Protocardiinae; Trachycardiinae; Tridacninae

Synonyms
- Lymnocardiidae

= Cockle (bivalve) =

Cockle Temporal range: Late Triassic – Present

Family of edible marine bivalve molluscs

A cockle is a marine bivalve mollusc. Although many small edible bivalves are loosely called cockles, true cockles are species in the family Cardiidae.

True cockles live in sandy, sheltered beaches throughout the world. The distinctive rounded shells are bilaterally symmetrical, and are heart-shaped when viewed from the end. Numerous radial, evenly spaced ribs are a feature of the shell in most but not all genera (for an exception, see the genus Laevicardium, the egg cockles, which have very smooth shells).

The shell of a cockle is able to close completely (i.e., there is no "gap" at any point around the edge). Though the shell of a cockle may superficially resemble that of a scallop because of the ribs, cockles can be distinguished from scallops morphologically in that cockle shells lack "auricles" (triangular ear-shaped protrusions near the hinge line) and scallop shells lack a pallial sinus. Behaviorally, cockles live buried in sediment, whereas scallops either are free-living and will swim into the water column to avoid a predator, or in some cases live attached by a byssus to a substrate.

The mantle has three apertures (inhalant, exhalant, and pedal) for siphoning water and for the foot to protrude. Cockles typically burrow using the foot, and feed by filtering plankton from the surrounding water. Cockles are capable of "jumping" by bending and straightening the foot. As is the case in many bivalves, cockles display gonochorism (the sex of an individual varies according to conditions), and some species reach maturity rapidly.

The common name "cockle" is also given by seafood sellers to a number of other small, edible marine bivalves which have a somewhat similar shape and sculpture, but are in other families such as the Veneridae (Venus clams) and the Arcidae (ark clams). Cockles in the family Cardiidae are sometimes referred to as "true cockles" to distinguish them from these other species.

== Species ==
There are more than 205 living species of cockles, with many more fossil forms.

The common cockle (Cerastoderma edule) is widely distributed around the coastlines of Northern Europe, with a range extending west to Ireland, the Barents Sea in the north, Norway in the east, and as far south as Senegal.

The dog cockle, Glycymeris glycymeris, has a similar range and habitat to the common cockle, but is not at all closely related, being in the family Glycymerididae. The dog cockle is edible, but due to its toughness when cooked it is generally not eaten, although a process is being developed to solve this problem.

The blood cockle, Tegillarca granosa (not related to the true cockles, instead in the ark clam family, Arcidae), is extensively cultured from southern Korea to Malaysia.

== Genera ==
Living genera within the family Cardiidae include:

- Acanthocardia Gray, 1851
- Acrosterigma Dall, 1900
- Adacna Eichwald, 1838
- Afrocardium Tomlin, 1931
- Americardia Stewart, 1930
- Apiocardia Olsson, 1961
- Bucardium Gray, 1853
- Cardium Linnaeus, 1758
- Cerastoderma Poli, 1795
- Ciliatocardium Kafanov, 1974
- Clinocardium Keen, 1936
- Corculum Röding, 1798
- Ctenocardia H. Adams & A. Adams, 1857
- Dallocardia Stewart, 1930
- Didacna Eichwald, 1838
- Dinocardium Dall, 1900
- Discors Deshayes, 1858
- Europicardium Popov, 1977
- Fragum Röding, 1798
- Freneixicardia J. A. Schneider, 2002
- Frigidocardium Habe, 1951
- Fulvia Gray, 1853
- Glans Megerle von Mühlfeld, 1811
- Goethemia Lambiotte, 1979
- Hippopus Lamarck, 1799
- Hypanis Pander in Menetries, 1832
- Keenaea Habe, 1951
- Keenocardium Kafanov, 1974
- Laevicardium Swainson, 1840
- Lophocardiium P. Fischer, 1887
- Lunulicardia Gray, 1853
- Lyrocardium Meek, 1876
- Maoricardium Marwick, 1944
- Microcardium Keen, 1937
- Microfragum Habe, 1951
- Monodacna Eichwald, 1838
- Nemocardium Meek, 1876
- Papillicardium Sacco, 1899
- Papyridea Swainson, 1840
- Parvicardium Monterosato, 1884
- Pratulum Iredale, 1924
- Procardium ter Poorten & La Perna, 2017
- Pseudofulvia Vidal & Kirkendale, 2007
- Ringicardium
- Serripes Gould, 1841
- Trachycardium Mörch, 1853
- Tridacna Bruguière, 1797, the "giant clams"
- Trigoniocardium
- Vasticardium Iredale, 1927
- Vepricardium Iredale, 1929
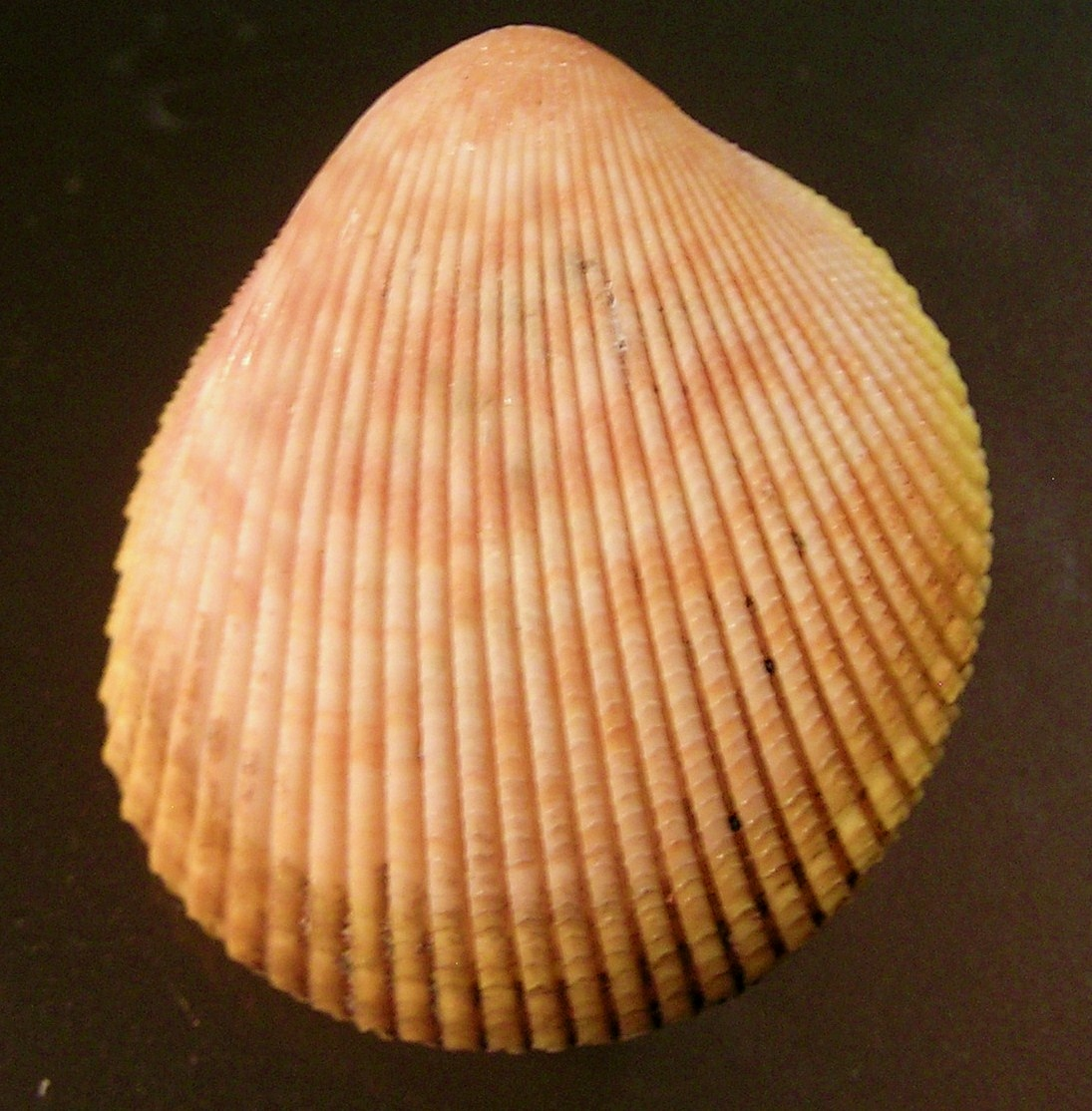
Acrosterigma cignorum from genus Acrosterigma

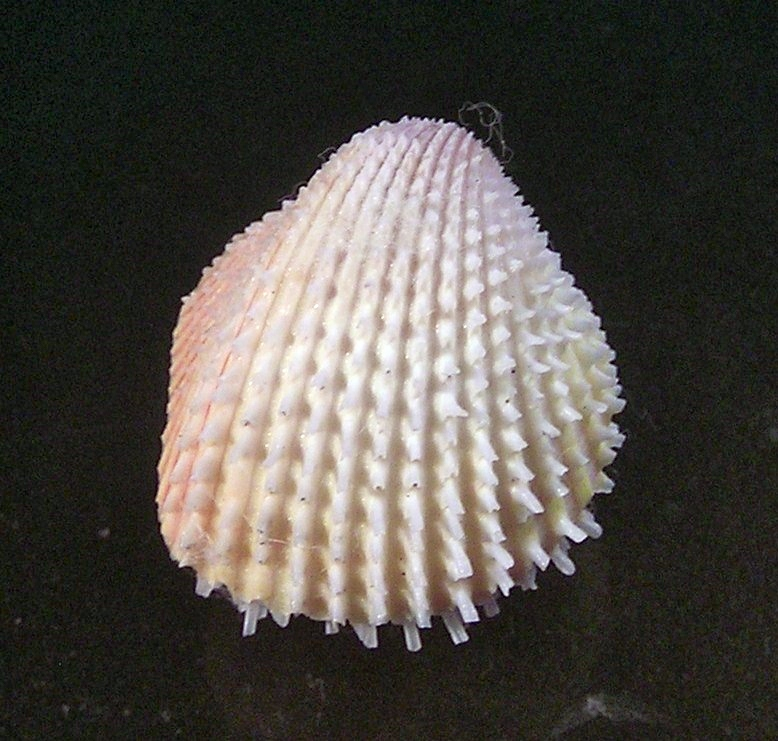
Ctenocardia virgo from genus Ctenocardia

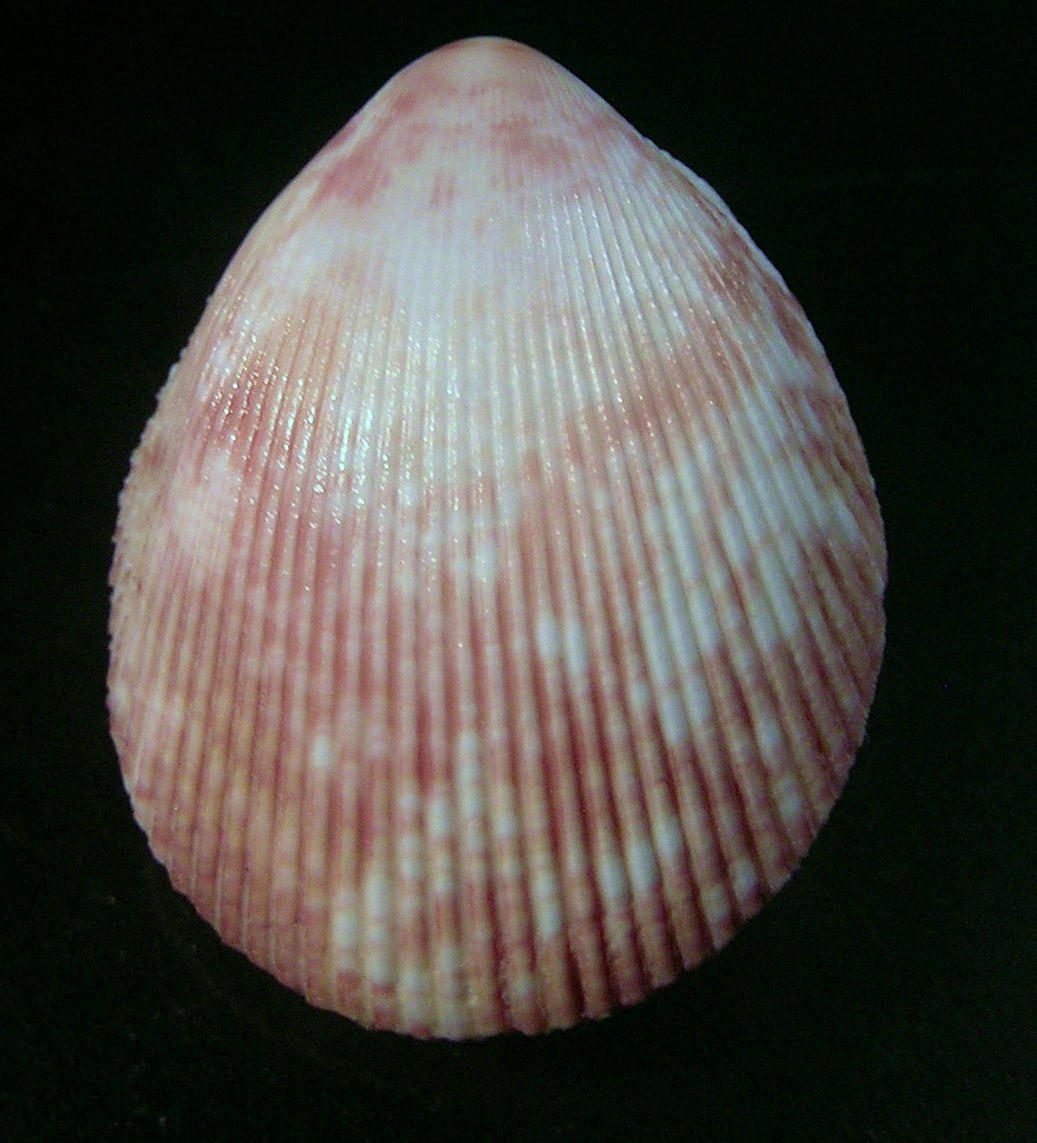
Trachycardium maculosum from genus Trachycardium

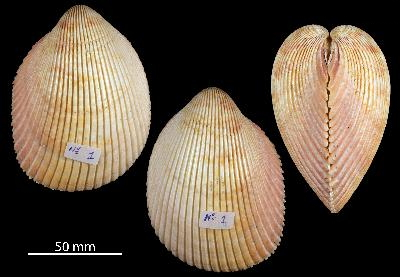
Vasticardium berschaueri from genus Vasticardium

=== Extinct genera ===
- † Acobaecardium Paramonova, 1986
- † Agnocardia Stewart, 1930
- † Aktschagylocardium Danukalova, 1996
- † Andrusovicardium Paramonova, 1986
- † Anechinocardium Hickman, 2015
- † Apscheronia Andrusov, 1903
- † Arcicardium P. Fischer, 1887
- † Arpadicardium Eberzin, 1947
- † Austrocardium Freneix & Grant-Mackie, 1978
- † Avicardium V. P. Kolesnikov, 1950
- † Avicularium Gray, 1853
- † Aviculocardium Bagdasarian, 1978
- † Bosphoricardium Eberzin, 1947
- † Budmania Brusina, 1897
- † Byssocardium Tournouër, 1882
- † Caladacna Andrusov, 1917
- † Caspicardium Astaf'yeva, 1955
- † Chartoconcha Andrusov, 1907
- † Chokrakia S. V. Popov, 2001
- † Dacicardium Papaianopol, 1975
- † Didacnoides Astaf'yeva, 1960
- † Didacnomya Andrusov, 1923 (uncertain, unassessed)
- † Digressodacna Davitashvili & Kitovani, 1964
- † Diversicostata Vassoevich & Eberzin, 1930
- † Ecericardium Eberzin, 1947
- † Eoprosodacna Davitashvili, 1934
- † Ethmocardium White, 1880
- † Euxinicardium Eberzin, 1947
- † Gilletella Marinescu, 1973
- † Goniocardium Vasseur, 1880
- † Granocardium Gabb, 1869
- † Habecardium Glibert & van de Poel, 1970
- † Hedecardium Marwick, 1944
- † Hellenicardium S. V. Popov & Nevesskaja, 2000
- † Horiodacna Stefanescu, 1896
- † Integricardium Rollier, 1912
- † Korobkoviella Merklin, 1974
- † Kubanocardium Muskhelishvili, 1965
- † Lahillia Cossmann, 1899
- † Limnodacna Eberzin, 1936
- † Limnopagetia Schlickum, 1963
- † Limnopappia Schlickum, 1962
- † Loxocardium Cossmann, 1886
- † Luxuridacna Papaianopol, 1980
- † Lymnocardium Stoliczka, 1870
- † Merklinicardium S. V. Popov, 1982 (uncertain, unassessed)
- † Metadacna Eberzin, 1959
- † Miricardium Paramonova, 1986
- † Moquicardium Eberzin, 1947
- † Myocardia Vest, 1861 (uncertain, unassessed)
- † Nargicardium Eberzin, 1947
- † Obsoletiformes Kojumdgieva, 1969
- † Omanidacna Harzhauser & Mandic, 2008
- † Oraphocardium Eberzin, 1949
- † Orthocardium Tremlett, 1950
- † Oxydacna Davitashvili, 1930
- † Pachydacna Eberzin, 1955
- † Pannonicardium Stevanović, 1951
- † Panticapaea Andrusov, 1923
- † Papyrocardium Gabuniya, 1953 (uncertain, unassessed)
- † Paradacna Andrusov, 1909
- † Parapscheronia Eberzin, 1955
- † Parvidacna Stevanović, 1950
- † Phyllocardium P. Fischer, 1887
- † Plagiocardium Cossmann, 1886
- † Plagiodacna Andrusov, 1903
- † Plagiodacnopsis Andrusov, 1923
- † Planacardium Paramonova, 1971
- † Plicatiformes Kojumdgieva, 1969
- † Pontalmyra Stefanescu, 1896
- † Prionopleura Eberzin, 1949
- † Prophyllicardium Jekelius, 1944 (uncertain, unassessed)
- † Prosochiasta Eberzin, 1959
- † Prosodacna Tournouër, 1882
- † Prosodacnomya Eberzin, 1959
- † Protocardia Beyrich, 1845
- † Protoplagiodacna Stevanović, 1978
- † Pseudocatillus Andrusov, 1903
- † Pteradacna Andrusov, 1907
- † Raricardium Paramonova, 1986
- † Replidacna Jekelius, 1944
- † Schedocardia Stewart, 1930
- † Schirvanicardium Andreescu, 1974
- † Stylodacna Stefanescu, 1896
- † Submonodacna Livental, 1931
- † Tauricardium Eberzin, 1947
- † Tschaudia Davitashvili & Kitovani, 1964
- † Turcmena G. I. Popov, 1956
- † Uniocardium Capellini, 1880 (uncertain, unassessed)
- † Yokoyamaina Hayami, 1958
- † Zamphiridacna Motaş, 1974

== In cuisine and culture ==
Cockles are a popular type of edible shellfish in both Eastern and Western cooking. They are collected by raking them from the sands at low tide, known as cockle-picking. Collecting cockles is hard work and can be dangerous if local tidal conditions are not carefully watched, as seen from the Morecambe Bay disaster, in which 23 cockle-pickers drowned after being caught in high tides.

Boiled cockles (sometimes grilled) are sold at many hawker centres in Southeast Asia, and are used in laksa, char kway teow and steamboat. They are called leas hal (លៀសហាល) in Khmer, kerang in Malay and see hum in Cantonese. Cockles are a street food in Cambodia, where they are usually steamed or boiled and served with a dipping sauce consisting of crushed peppercorns, salt and lime juice. In Japan, the Japanese egg cockle (Laevicardium laevigatum) is used to create torigai sushi.

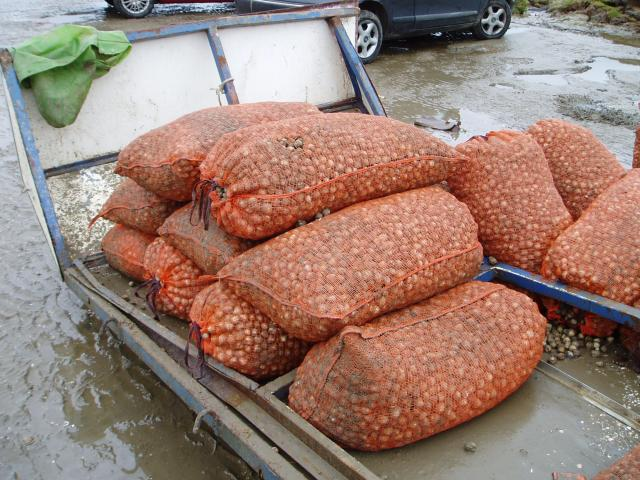
Bags of cockles picked from Morecambe Bay

Cockles are sold freshly cooked as a snack in the United Kingdom, particularly in those parts of the British coastline where cockles are abundant. Boiled, then seasoned with malt vinegar and white pepper, they can be bought from seafood stalls, which also often have for sale mussels, whelks, jellied eels, crabs and shrimp. Cockles are also available pickled in jars, and more recently, have been sold in sealed packets (with vinegar) containing a plastic two-pronged fork. A meal of cockles fried with bacon, served with laverbread, is known as a traditional Welsh breakfast.

In England and Wales, as of 2011, people are permitted to collect 8 pounds of cockles for personal use. Those wishing to collect more than this are deemed to be engaging in commercial fishing and are required to obtain a permit from the Inshore Fisheries and Conservation Authority. A study conducted in England in the early 1980s showed a correlation between the consumption of cockles, presumed to be incorrectly processed, and an elevated local occurrence of hepatitis.

Cockles are an effective bait for a wide variety of sea fishes. The folk song "Molly Malone" is also known as "Cockles and Mussels" because the title character's sale of the two foods is referred to in the song's refrain. The shells of cockles are mentioned in the English nursery rhyme "Mary, Mary, Quite Contrary". Cockles are also eaten by the indigenous peoples of North America.

== Alternative meanings ==
The common English phrase "it warms the cockles of my heart" is used to mean that a feeling of deep-seated contentment has been generated.

Differing derivations of this phrase have been proposed, either directly from the perceived heart-shape of a cockleshell, or indirectly (the scientific name for the type genus of the family is Cardium, from the Latin for heart), or from the Latin diminutive of the word heart, corculum. Another proposed derivation is from the Latin for the ventricles of the heart, cochleae cordis, where the second word is an inflected form of cor, heart, while cochlea is the Latin for snail.
