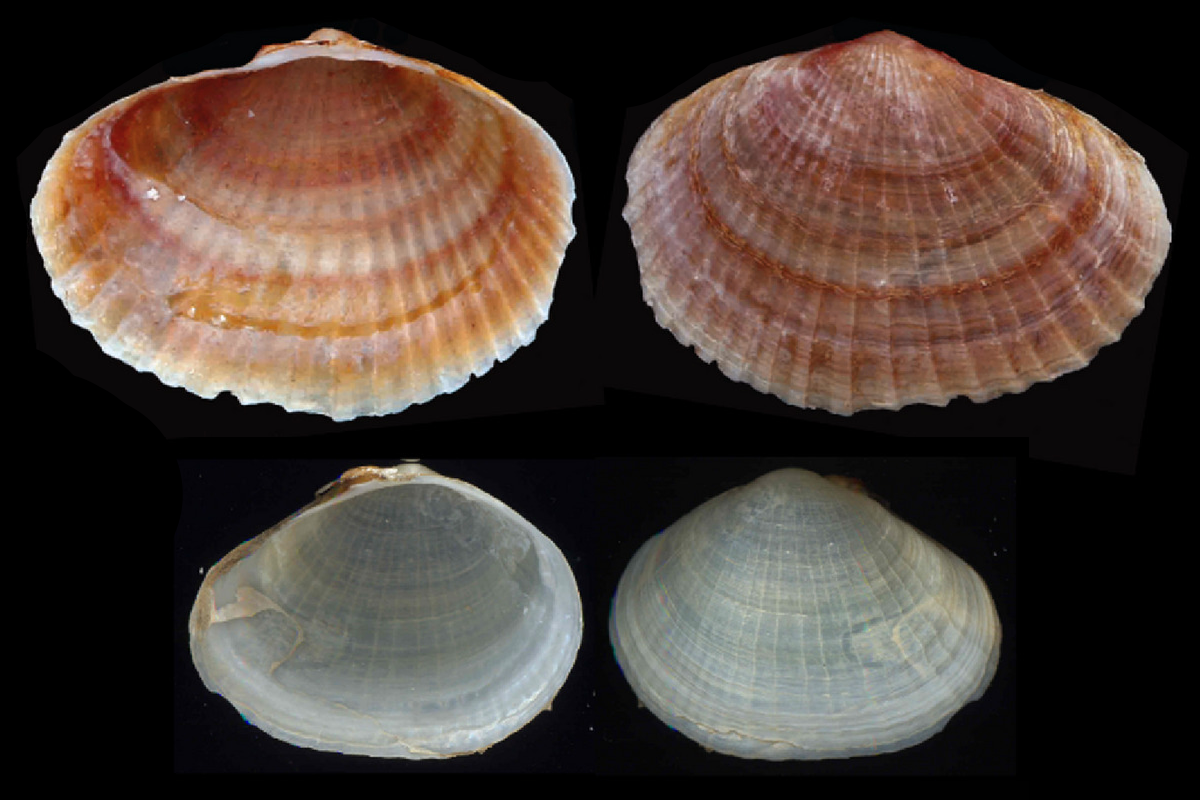
- Shells of Adacna fragilis from the Taganrog Bay (top) and Adacna vitrea from the Tsimlyansk Reservoir (bottom)

Scientific classification
- Kingdom: Animalia
- Phylum: Mollusca
- Class: Bivalvia
- Order: Cardiida
- Family: Cardiidae
- Subfamily: Lymnocardiinae
- Tribe: Adacnini
- Genus: Adacna; Eichwald, 1838

Type species
- Glycymeris laeviuscula Eichwald, 1829

Synonyms
- Neoadacna Ali-Zade, 1973

= Adacna =

Genus of bivalves

Adacna is a genus of fresh- and brackish-water bivalve molluscs of the cockle family (Cardiidae). It includes species characterized by thin shells, with flattened ribs and usually rather deep pallial sinus. The four extant species are found in fresh- and brackish-water lakes of the Danube Delta, estuaries (limans) of the north-western Black Sea, the Taganrog Bay of the Sea of Azov and the Caspian Sea. Two Caspian species were also present in the Aral Sea, where they went extinct by the end of the 1970s as the lake was shrinking and became more saline. Two fossil species have been described from the Pleistocene deposits of the Caspian Sea region and one species is only known from the Late Pleistocene of south-eastern Turkey.

These bivalves are mobile filter feeders that live on silty, sandy and sandy-silty bottoms and usually fully burrow into the sediment, leaving their long and fused siphons on the surface. They feed on suspended detritus and unicellular algae, but are also able to consume food particles on the sediment surface.

== Description ==
Species of the genus Adacna have thin and often translucent oval or oval-triangular shells, with flattened and sometimes hardly visible radial ribs. The valves gape at the anterior and posterior margins. The pallial line has a sinus, which is usually rather deep. The hinge may have no teeth, but sometimes reduced cardinal teeth can be present in one or both valves.

The siphons of Adacna are long and fused, with few papillae on their ends. The foot is short and compressed.

=== Differences from similar genera ===
Members of the genus Monodacna have less gaping shells, with a shallower pallial sinus. Species of Hypanis differ by stronger developed sharp ribs. The extinct Apscheronia and Caspicardium have more protruding umbones and more convex shells.

== Distribution ==
Adacna fragilis inhabits fresh- and brackish-water lakes of the Danube Delta, estuaries (limans) of the north-western Black Sea and the Taganrog Bay of the Sea of Azov. Adacna laeviuscula, Adacna vitrea and Adacna minima live in the Caspian Sea. A. vitrea and A. minima were also present in the Aral Sea, but these populations seem to have gone extinct by the end of the 1970s during the human-driven shrinkage and salinization of the lake. Furthermore, the Caspian A. vitrea has been introduced into the Tsimlyansk Reservoir of the Don River and into the Taganrog Bay.

== Ecology ==
Cockles of the genus Adacna live on silty, sandy and sandy-silty bottoms at depths from 0 to 60 m (0 to 200 ft) in waters with salinity of up to 14‰, although A. fragilis and A. vitrea have also been found in freshwater habitats. These bivalves are mobile filter feeders that usually fully burrow into the sediment and leave their siphons on the surface. They feed on suspended detritus and unicellular algae, but are also able to consume food particles on the sediment surface. In the absence of suspended food particles, the molluscs burrow into the sediment and stir it up with their siphons.

Species that lived in the Aral Sea (reported as A. vitrea minima) have separate sexes. Most of their juveniles appeared in July and grew up to 10 mm long during the summer. After the first year of their lives the growth rate slowed down. Their maximum life span was 4–5 years.

== Fossil record ==
The extinct Adacna praeplicata and Adacna praepraeplicata occur in deposits of the Apsheronian Basin, which existed on the territory of the modern Caspian Sea during the Pleistocene from 1,8 or 2,1 million to 880,000–750,000 years ago. The former species was described as being similar and related to the extant Hypanis plicata which was also found in the Apsheronian deposits and at the time was placed within Adacna.

Adacna yaninae was described from the Late Pleistocene deposits of the mostly dry Konya Basin in south-eastern Turkey, which was previously occupied by a large lake. The species has been classified as a member of Adacna due to its structure of the hinge, although its shell is more convex compared to its congeners and it has sharp ribs which are more similar to those of Hypanis.

Fossilized shells of the extant A. laeviuscula and A. vitrea occur in deposits of the Caspian Sea Basin since its Khazarian stage, which began 125,000–80,000 years ago. A. laeviuscula has also been found in the Late Pleistocene deposits of the Manych Depression where a strait connecting the Caspian and the Azov-Black Sea basins has repeatedly formed in the past. A. vitrea also occurred in the Black Sea Basin during its brackish-water Neoeuxinian stage when the Caspian waters flowed into the Black Sea through the Manych strait from 16,000 to 12,500 years ago.

A. minima has been recorded from the Late Pleistocene deposits of the lower Volga River corresponding to the Hyrcanian stage of the Caspian Sea which began 107,000 ± 7,000 years ago. This species also occurs in the Holocene deposits of the Aral Sea.

== Taxonomy ==
The genus Adacna was established by Karl Eichwald in 1838 and initially included four species, which he previously attributed to the genus Glycymeris: G. laeviuscula, G. vitrea, G. colorata and G. plicata. A. laeviuscula has been designated as the type species of the genus by Vest (1875).

The taxonomy of the genera Adacna, Monodacna and Hypanis varied in different works. Zhadin (1952), for instance, treated Adacna and Monodacna as distinct genera, while Hypanis was considered to be a subgenus of the former. Logvinenko and Starobogatov (1969) found distinguishing the genera difficult and regarded Adacna and Monodacna as subgenera of Hypanis. Starobogatov et al. (2004) recognized Adacna as a separate genus, with Monodacna being its subgenus. Currently, all three genera are considered distinct, although molecular studies are necessary to confirm their validity.

Neoadacna is a genus described by Ali-Zade (1973) which included A. laeviuscula (as the type species), A. praeplicata as well as Hypanis plicata and Hypanis andrussowi, which were previously often included in Adacna. Nevesskaja et al. (2001) listed Neoadacna as a partial synonym of Hypanis and Adacna, while J. J. ter Poorten (2024) treated it as a synonym of the latter.

== Species ==
The following species are recognized:

=== Extant species ===
- Adacna fragilis Milaschewitsch, 1908
- Adacna laeviuscula (Eichwald, 1829)
- Adacna minima Ostroumov, 1907
- Adacna vitrea (Eichwald, 1829)

=== Extinct species ===
- Adacna praeplicata V. P. Kolesnikov, 1950
- Adacna praepraeplicata G. I. Popov, 1961
- Adacna yaninae Büyükmeriç & Wesselingh, 2018

== Cited texts ==
- Kijashko, P. V. (2013). "Mollyuski Kaspiyskogo morya" [Molluscs of the Caspian sea]. In Bogutskaya, N. G.; Kijashko, P. V.; Naseka, A. M.; Orlova, M. I. (eds.). Identification keys for fish and invertebrates of the Caspian Sea (in Russian). Vol. 1. Fish and molluscs. St. Petersburg; Moscow: KMK Scientific Press Ltd. pp. 298–392. ISBN 978-5-87317-932-9.
- Logvinenko, B. M.; Starobogatov, Y. I. (1969). "Tip Mollyuski. Mollusca" [Phylum Molluscs. Mollusca]. In Birshteyn, Y. A.; Vinogradov, L. G.; Kondakov, N. N.; Kuhn, M. S.; Astakhova, T. V.; Romanova, N. N. (eds.). Atlas bespozvonochnykh Kaspiyskogo morya [Atlas of the Invertebrates of the Caspian Sea] (in Russian). Moscow: Pishchevaya Promyshlennost. pp. 308–385.
