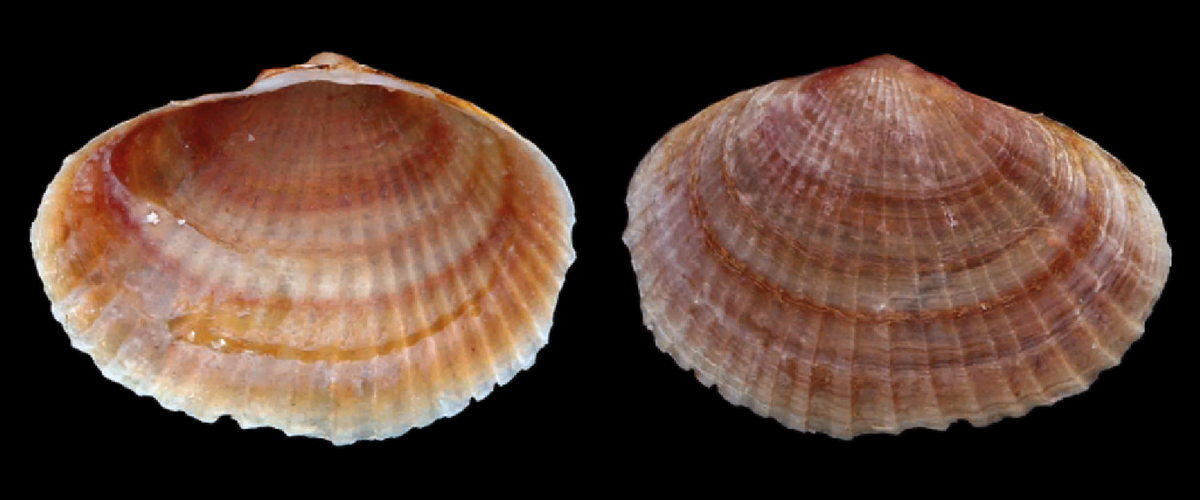
- Shell of Adacna fragilis from the Taganrog Bay (Merzhanovo, Russia)

Scientific classification
- Kingdom: Animalia
- Phylum: Mollusca
- Class: Bivalvia
- Order: Cardiida
- Family: Cardiidae
- Genus: Adacna
- Species: A. fragilis

Binomial name
- Adacna fragilis Milaschewitsch, 1908

= Adacna fragilis =

Species of brackish-water bivalve

Adacna fragilis is a brackish-water bivalve mollusc of the family Cardiidae, the cockles. It has an oval, thin, white, pale yellow or brownish shell, up to 37 mm (1.5 in) in length, covered with narrow ribs. It lives in estuaries, lagoons and lakes around the northwestern coast of the Black Sea and in the Taganrog Bay of the Sea of Azov. The species is a filter feeder that burrows into soft silty sediments and feeds on suspended detritus. It can occur in large numbers and acts as a food source for bottom-feeding fish. Studies in the 21st century indicate a strong decline and local extinctions of some populations due to human activity such as changes in salinity caused by damming and diversion of rivers.

== Taxonomy ==
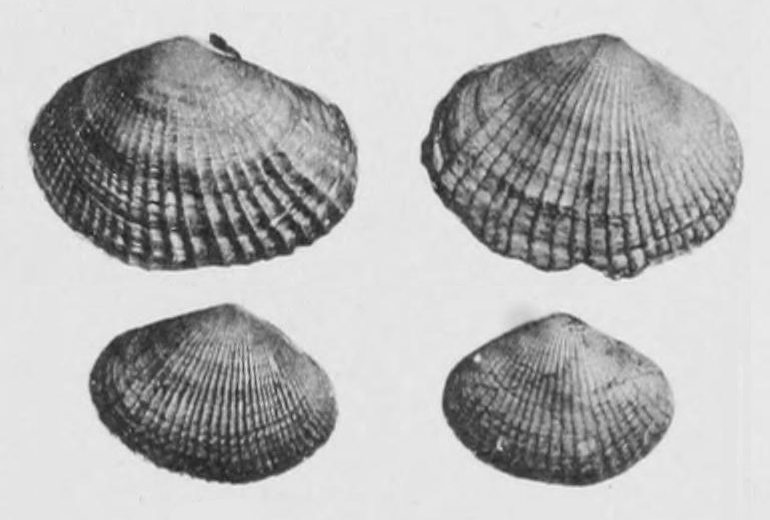
Specimens from the Dniester Liman as illustrated in a 1916 monograph by Milaschewitsch

Adacna fragilis was first described from the Dniester Liman and Lake Katlabukh by Russian geologist and paleontologist Konstantin Osipovich Milaschewitsch in 1908. It was subsequently illustrated in his posthumously published 1916 monograph on the molluscs of the Black Sea and the Sea of Azov. The specific epithet fragilis refers to the fragile shell of the species. The whereabouts of the type specimens (specimens used for the original description) are unknown.

In the 1952 monograph Molluscs of Fresh and Brackish Waters of the USSR, Vladimir Ivanovich Zhadin treated A. fragilis as a variety of Adacna laeviuscula, a species from the Caspian Sea. In a 1972 publication, Orest Alexandrovich Scarlato and Yaroslav Igorevich Starobogatov regarded A. fragilis as a subspecies of A. laeviuscula under the name Hypanis laeviuscula fragilis. In 2004, Starobogatov and colleagues once again recognized A. fragilis as a distinct species, though some subsequent researchers considered it to be a junior synonym of A. laeviuscula and its taxonomic status was listed as uncertain by Wesselingh and co-authors in 2019. Further research by Gogaladze and co-authors published in 2021 concluded that A. fragilis and A. laeviuscula are distinct species as they differ by the structure of their shells and by salinity preferences.

== Description ==
The shell of Adacna fragilis is oval, thin and compressed, with narrow openings along the anterior and posterior margins when closed. It has a low umbo (apex) that is situated somewhat closer to the anterior margin and about 23–32 irregularly placed narrow radial ribs that are usually more pronounced on the middle part of the shell. The pallial line (trace of the mantle muscles on the interior of the shell) has a deep sinus (indentation) that does not reach half the length of the shell. The shell length is up to 37 mm (1.5 in), the height is up to 17 mm (0.67 in). The colour is white, pale yellow or brownish, with a thin yellowish gray-tan periostracum (outer layer). The hinge (mechanism that keeps the two valves of the shell aligned) lacks interlocking teeth or consists of a single weakly developed tooth below the umbo of one of the valves.

The siphons of A. fragilis are significantly longer than its shell when fully extended and are fused together across most of their length. The foot is relatively narrow and short.

=== Similar species ===
A. laeviuscula from the Caspian Sea differs from A. fragilis by its larger size, a less symmetrical shell with a narrower anterior margin, a slightly lower number of ribs and in that its pallial sinus extends up to half of the shell length. Another Caspian species, Adacna vitrea, has been introduced into the Taganrog Bay of the Sea of Azov that is also inhabited by A. fragilis. A. vitrea is distinguished by having weakly developed ribs and the colouration of its shell is often partially pinkish or purple.

== Distribution ==
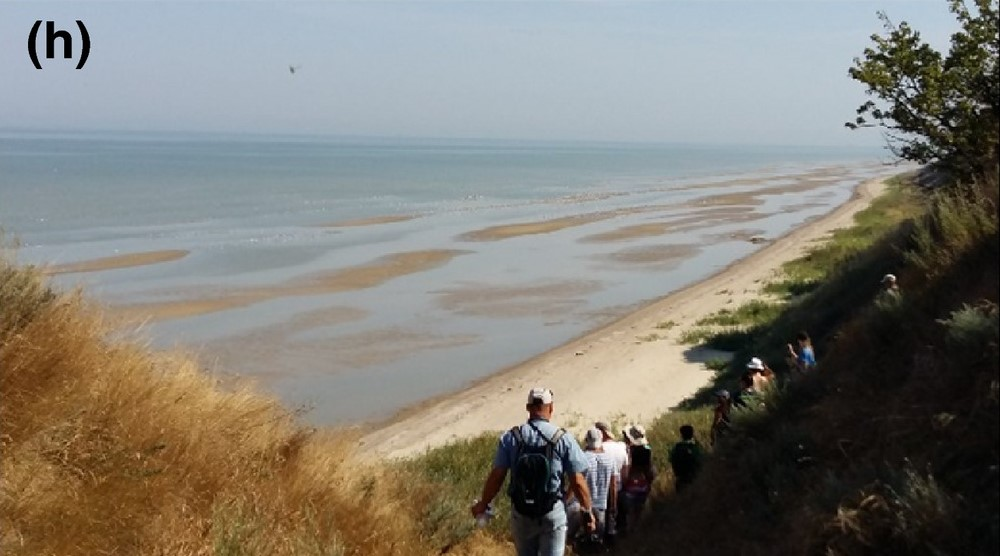
The Taganrog Bay in the Sea of Azov is one of the natural habitats of Adacna fragilis

Adacna fragilis is found in estuaries, lagoons and lakes around the northwestern coast of the Black Sea and in the Sea of Azov. Its natural range includes the Razelm–Sinoe Lagoon complex, the lakes Kagul, Yalpuh and Katlabukh, the Dniester and Kuchurgan limans, the Dnieper–Bug Estuary, the lower estuarine part of the Southern Bug river up to Nova Odesa, the Dnieper Delta and the Taganrog Bay. Studies in the 21st century indicate that this species has significantly declined across much of its range due to human activity. It has become rare in the Dnieper–Bug Estuary and is declining in the Dniester Liman due to unstable salinity levels caused by the construction of dams along rivers. The species is now locally extinct in the Razelm–Sinoe complex, the salinity of which decreased after it was connected to the Danube in the 20th century and the main inlet connecting the lagoon system with the Black Sea was closed around 1960–1970. Between 1981 and 1984, A. fragilis also disappeared from the Kuchurgan Liman due to increased thermal pollution as the liman was turned into a cooling pond in 1965. The mollusc remains common and abundant in the Taganrog Bay.

At the end of the 20th century, A. fragilis spread into the Sasyk Lagoon which was formerly inhabited by marine species, but was transformed into a brackish water reservoir after getting connected to the Danube via a canal in 1978. In 2003, several living individuals of this species have also been found outside of its native range in the Kremenchuk Reservoir of the Dnieper.

== Ecology ==
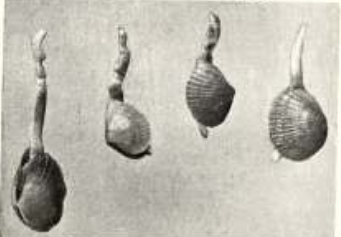
Specimens from Lake Katlabukh and Lake Razelm

Adacna fragilis lives on soft silty bottoms at shallow depths. It is a filter feeder that burrows into the sediment and feeds on suspended detritus. In the Sasyk Lagoon, the species can reach densities of up to 200–400 individuals per square metre and acts as an important food source for bottom-feeding fish such as the common carp (Cyprinus carpio), Prussian carp (Carassius gibelio) and gobies.

In the Taganrog Bay, A. fragilis forms large populations together with the bivalve Monodacna colorata. These two species have become the most abundant benthic animals of the Sasyk Lagoon after its salinity decreased due to the artificial connection with the Danube.

In the Razelm–Sinoe Lagoon complex, the Dniester Liman and the Dnieper–Bug Estuary, A. fragilis and M. colorata commonly occurred with the bivalve Hypanis plicata. Bivalve aggregations containing A. fragilis and H. plicata were no longer observed in these habitats in the 21st century, as both species became rare in the northwestern Black Sea and H. plicata may have become locally extinct.

== Conservation ==
Adacna fragilis is listed in the Red Data Book of Ukraine under the Vulnerable category (as Hypanis laeviuscula) and in the Red Book of Moldova under the Critically Endangered category (as H. laeviuscula fragilis). Its conservation status has not been assessed by the International Union for Conservation of Nature (IUCN).
