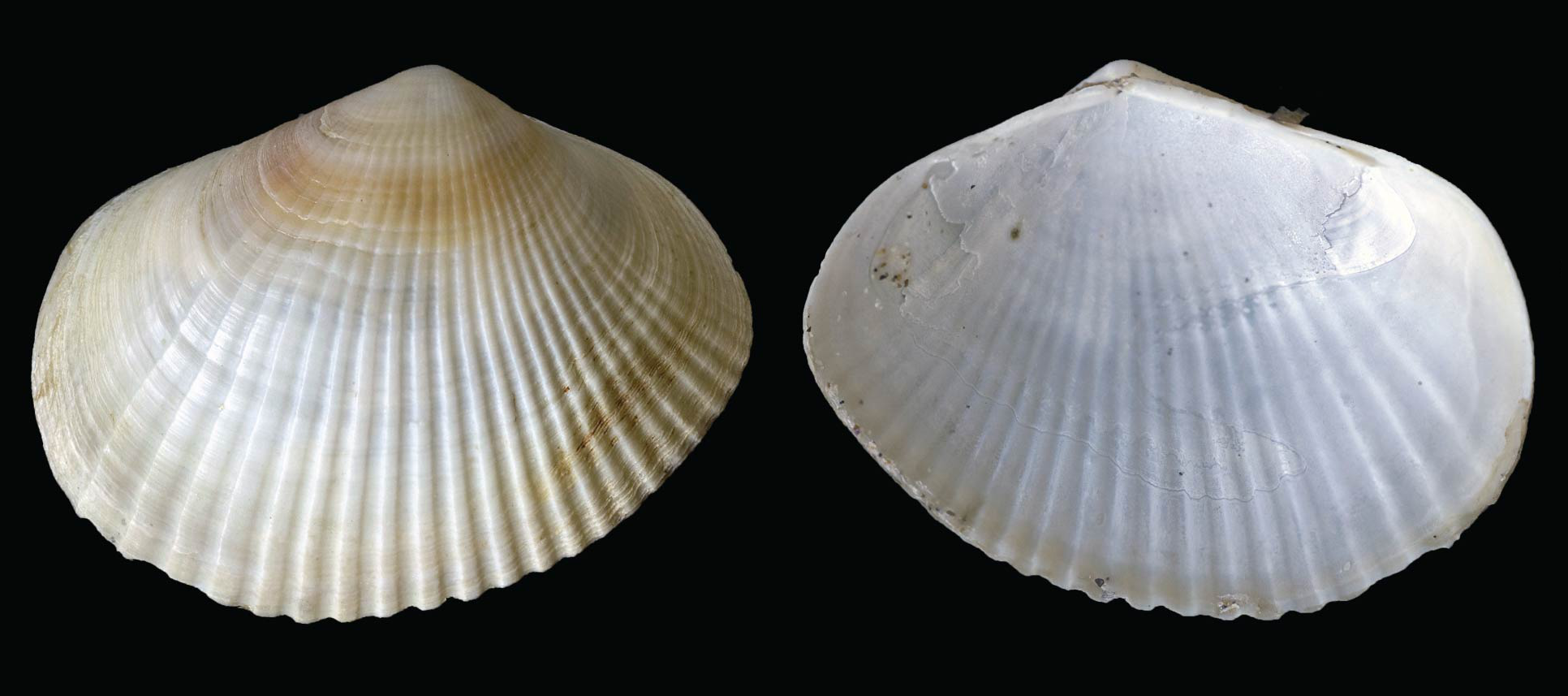

Scientific classification
- Kingdom: Animalia
- Phylum: Mollusca
- Class: Bivalvia
- Order: Cardiida
- Family: Cardiidae
- Genus: Adacna
- Species: A. laeviuscula

Binomial name
- Adacna laeviuscula (Eichwald, 1829)

Synonyms
- Pholadomya caspica Agassiz, 1842

= Adacna laeviuscula =

Species of brackish-water bivalve

Adacna laeviuscula is a brackish-water bivalve mollusc of the family Cardiidae, the cockles. It has an irregularly oval, thin, semitranslucent white shell, up to 40–50 mm (1.6–2.0 in) in length, with a narrower anterior end, and flattened ribs. The species is endemic to the Caspian Sea. It lives at depths from 0 to 30–60 m (0 to 98–197 ft) and burrows into soft sediments.

== Description ==
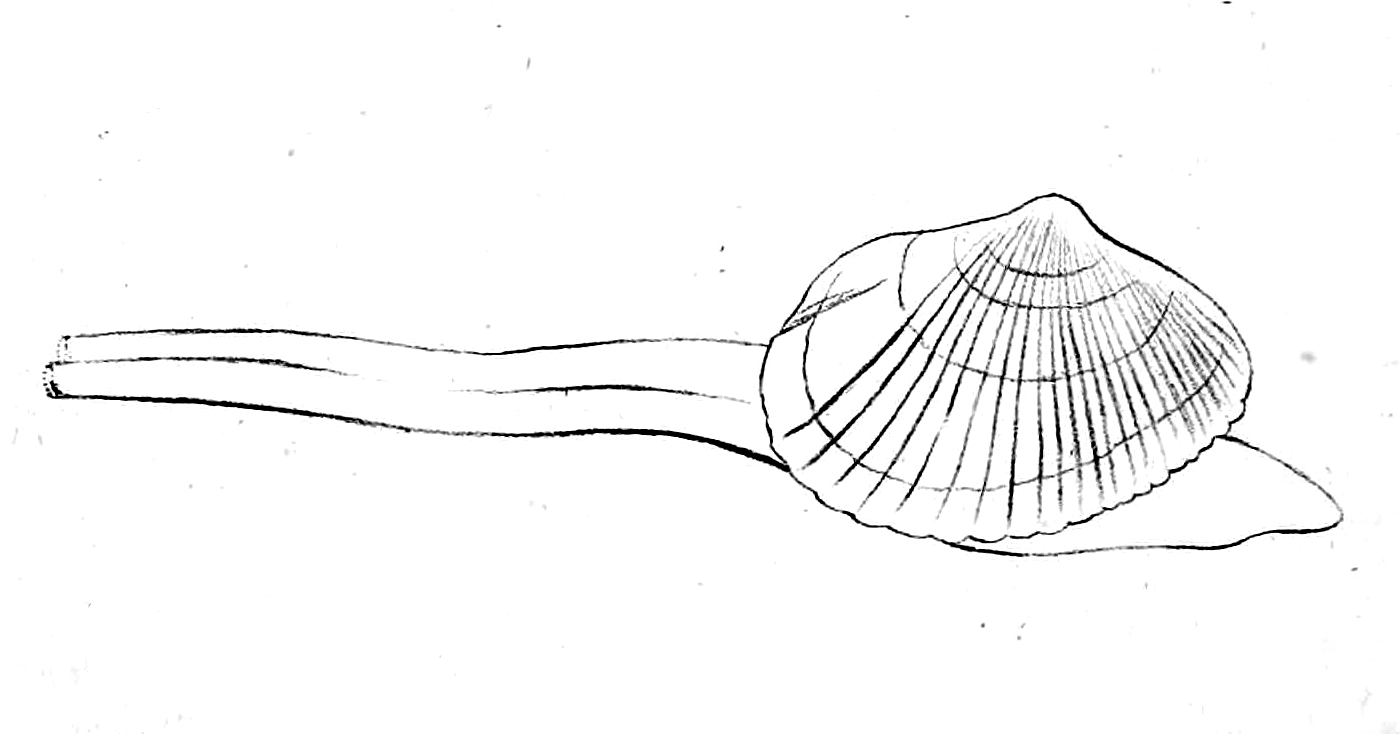
Crawling individual with extended siphons

Adacna laeviuscula has an irregularly oval, thin, compressed, semitranslucent shell, with a narrower anterior margin, an anteriorly displaced umbo, 20–29 flattened radial ribs, which are wider on the posterior half, and a wide and deep pallial sinus, which extends up to half of the shell length or is slightly deeper. The shell length is up to 40–50 mm (1.6–2.0 in). The valves are strongly gaping at the anterior and posterior margins. The coloration is white, with very thin light yellowish periostracum. The hinge may have no teeth or a reduced cardinal tooth can be present in the right valve.

The siphons of this species are twice as long as its shell.

=== Similar species ===
Adacna vitrea glabra differs from smaller specimens of A. laeviuscula from the Northern Caspian Sea by weaker developed ribs.

Adacna fragilis from limans and estuaries of the Black Sea and the Sea of Azov is a smaller species, with a more symmetrical shell, slightly more ribs, which are usually more pronounced on the middle part of the shell, and a pallial sinus that does not extend up to half of the shell length.

Monodacna semipellucida has a broadly oval shell, with a shallower pallial sinus and reduced cardinal teeth in both valves.

== Distribution and ecology ==
Adacna laeviuscula is endemic to the Caspian Sea. It lives at a salinity of at least 4‰ at depths from 0 to 30 m (0 to 98 ft), rarely down to 60 m (197 ft). The species burrows into soft sediments. Its fresh shells with paired valves commonly wash ashore.

Individuals of A. laeviuscula from the Northern Caspian Sea in waters with salinity levels of 4–9‰ are smaller than those living in the central and southern parts of the sea at salinities of 12–14‰.

== Fossil record ==
Adacna laeviuscula occurs in deposits of the Caspian Sea since its Khazarian stage, which began during the Middle Pleistocene. The species has also been found in the Late Pleistocene of the Manych Depression where a strait connecting the Caspian Sea with the Black Sea and the Sea of Azov has repeatedly formed in the geologic past. L. A. Nevesskaja and co-authors (2001) hypothesized that A. laeviuscula could be a descendant of the extinct Monodacna praelaeviuscula from deposits of the Apsheronian Basin, which existed in the location of the modern Caspian Sea from 1,8 or 2,1 million to 880,000–750,000 years ago.

== Taxonomy ==
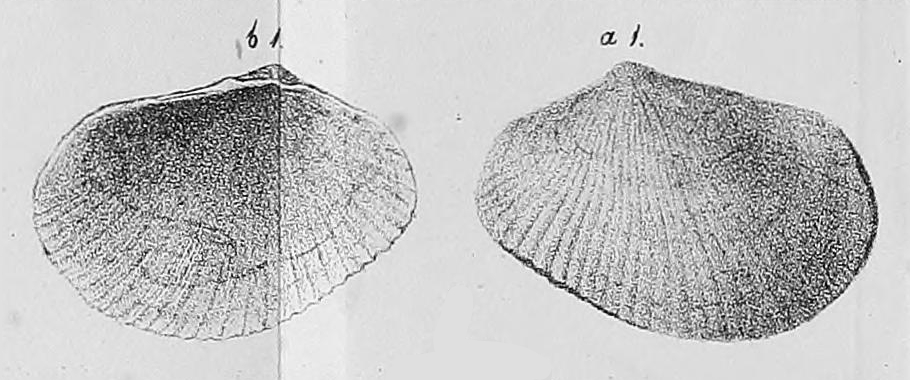
Illustrations of Glycymeris laeviuscula from Eichwald's publication (1829). This specimen is now recognized as the lectotype of the species.

The species was first described as Glycymeris laeviuscula by Russian naturalist Karl Eduard von Eichwald in 1829. In 1838 he transferred it into the newly described genus Adacna. Subsequently, von W. Vest designated A. laeviuscula as the type species of its genus in 1875.

Eichwald initially reported Glycymeris laeviuscula from "the southern border of the Caspian Sea in bight of Astrabad" (Gorgan, Iran). However, one of the two shells collected by him in the Bay of Baku in Azerbaijan was found to be identical to the original illustrations of the species, apart from the fact that they depict a left valve while the actual specimen is a right valve. This specimen is now considered to be the lectotype of A. laeviuscula, and according to Article 76.2 of the International Code of Zoological Nomenclature, the Bay of Baku becomes the type locality of the species. The lectotype as well as the second specimen from this locality (the paralectotype) are both kept in the Zoological Institute of the Russian Academy of Sciences.

Jean Louis Rodolphe Agassiz, who was possibly unaware of Eichwald's works, redescribed the species as Pholadomya caspica in 1842. This name is now regarded as a junior synonym of A. laeviuscula.

The species Adacna fragilis from the Black Sea basin was described in 1908 and has often been treated either as a variety or as a subspecies of A. laeviuscula in later publications. It was once again recognized as a distinct species by Yaroslav Igorevich Starobogatov and co-authors in the Key to Freshwater Invertebrates of Russia and Adjacent Lands published in 2004, while its taxonomic status was listed as uncertain in the 2019 checklist of Pontocaspian molluscs by F. P. Wesselingh and co-authors. A 2021 review on the brackish water molluscs of the Black Sea basin by Gogaladze et al. (2021) suggests that A. fragilis is a distinct species from the Caspian A. laeviuscula as they differ by shell characteristics and salinity preferences. The two species were similarly treated as distinct in a 2024 monograph on the family Cardiidae by J. J. ter Poorten.

== Cited texts ==
- Kijashko, P. V. (2013). "Mollyuski Kaspiyskogo morya" [Molluscs of the Caspian sea]. In Bogutskaya, N. G.; Kijashko, P. V.; Naseka, A. M.; Orlova, M. I. (eds.). Identification keys for fish and invertebrates of the Caspian Sea (in Russian). Vol. 1. Fish and molluscs. St. Petersburg; Moscow: KMK Scientific Press Ltd. pp. 298–392. ISBN 978-5-87317-932-9.
- Logvinenko, B. M.; Starobogatov, Y. I. (1969). "Tip Mollyuski. Mollusca" [Phylum Molluscs. Mollusca]. In Birshteyn, Y. A.; Vinogradov, L. G.; Kondakov, N. N.; Kuhn, M. S.; Astakhova, T. V.; Romanova, N. N. (eds.). Atlas bespozvonochnykh Kaspiyskogo morya [Atlas of the Invertebrates of the Caspian Sea] (in Russian). Moscow: Pishchevaya Promyshlennost. pp. 308–385.
- ter Poorten, J. J. (2024). A taxonomic iconography of living Cardiidae. Harxheim: ConchBooks. ISBN 978-3-948603-48-9.
- Zhadin, V. I. (1952). Mollyuski presnykh i solonovatykh vod SSSR [Molluscs of Fresh and Brackish Waters of the USSR] (PDF). Opredeliteli po faune SSSR, izdavayemyye Zoologicheskim institutom AN (in Russian). Vol. 46. Moscow–Leningrad: The USSR Academy of Sciences Press. Archived (PDF) from the original on 2 December 2024.
