= List of non-marine molluscs of Moldova =

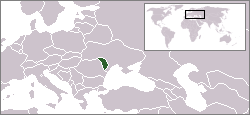
Location of Moldova

The non-marine molluscs of Moldova are a part of the molluscan fauna of Moldova (wildlife of Moldova). A number of species of non-marine molluscs are found in the wild in Moldova.

== Freshwater gastropods ==
Neritidae

- Theodoxus danubialis (Pfeiffer, 1828)
- Theodoxus euxinus (Clessin, 1886)
- Theodoxus fluviatilis (Linnaeus, 1758)
- Theodoxus transversalis (Pfeiffer, 1828)

Viviparidae

- Viviparus contectus (Millet, 1813)
- Viviparus viviparus (Linnaeus, 1758)

Valvatidae

- Borysthenia naticina (Menke, 1845)
- Valvata cristata Müller, 1774
- Valvata macrostoma Mörch, 1864
- Valvata piscinalis (Müller, 1774)

Bithyniidae

- Bithynia leachii (Sheppard, 1823)
- Bithynia tentaculata (Linnaeus, 1758)

Hydrobiidae

- Lithoglyphus naticoides (Pfeiffer, 1828)
- Potamopyrgus antipodarum (Gray, 1843)
- Turricaspia lincta (Milaschevich, 1908)
- Turricaspia triton (Eichwald, 1838)

Thiaridae

- Esperiana esperi (Férussac, 1823)
- Microcolpia daudebartii (Prevost, 1821)

Physidae

- Aplexa hypnorum (Linnaeus, 1758)
- Physa acuta Draparnaud, 1805
- Physa fontinalis (Linnaeus, 1758)

Lymnaeidae

- Galba truncatula (Müller, 1774)
- Lymnaea stagnalis (Linnaeus, 1758)
- Myxas glutinosa (Müller, 1774)
- Radix auricularia (Linnaeus, 1758)
- Radix balthica (Linnaeus, 1758)
- Radix labiata (Rossmässler, 1835)
- Stagnicola palustris (Müller, 1774)

Acroloxidae

- Acroloxus lacustris (Linnaeus, 1758)

Planorbidae

- Ancylus fluviatilis Müller, 1774
- Anisus septemgyratus (Rossmässler, 1835)
- Anisus spirorbis (Linnaeus, 1758)
- Anisus vorticulus (Troschel, 1834)
- Anisus vortex (Linnaeus, 1758)
- Bathyomphalus contortus (Linnaeus, 1758)
- Ferrissia fragilis (Tryon, 1863)
- Gyraulus acronicus (Férussac, 1807)
- Gyraulus albus (Müller, 1774)
- Gyraulus crista (Linnaeus, 1758)
- Gyraulus laevis (Alder, 1838)
- Hippeutis complanatus (Linnaeus, 1758)
- Planorbarius corneus (Linnaeus, 1758)
- Planorbis carinatus Müller, 1774
- Planorbis planorbis (Linnaeus, 1758)
- Segmentina nitida (Müller, 1774)

== Land gastropods ==
Pomatiidae

- Pomatias rivularis (Eichwald, 1829)

Aciculidae

- Platyla polita (Hartmann, 1840)

Succineidae

- Oxyloma elegans (Risso, 1826)
- Oxyloma sarsii (Esmark, 1886)
- Succinea putris (Linnaeus, 1758)
- Succinella oblonga (Draparnaud, 1801)

Carychiidae

- Carychium minimum Müller, 1774
- Carychium tridentatum (Risso, 1826)

Cochlicopidae

- Cochlicopa lubrica (Müller, 1774)
- Cochlicopa lubricella (Porro, 1838)

Orculidae

- Sphyradium doliolum (Bruguière, 1792)

Valloniidae

- Acanthinula aculeata (Müller, 1774)
- Vallonia costata (Müller, 1774)
- Vallonia enniensis (Gredler, 1856)
- Vallonia excentrica Sterki, 1893
- Vallonia pulchella (Müller, 1774)

Pupillidae

- Pupilla muscorum (Linnaeus, 1758)

Vertiginidae

- Columella edentula (Draparnaud, 1805)
- Truncatellina claustralis (Gredler, 1856)
- Truncatellina costulata (Nilsson, 1823)
- Truncatellina cylindrica (Férussac, 1807)
- Vertigo angustior Jeffreys, 1830
- Vertigo antivertigo (Draparnaud, 1801)
- Vertigo moulinsiana (Dupuy, 1849)
- Vertigo pusilla Müller, 1774
- Vertigo pygmaea (Draparnaud, 1801)

Chondrinidae

- Granaria frumentum (Draparnaud, 1801)

Enidae

- Brephulopsis cylindrica (Menke, 1828)
- Chondrula tridens (Müller, 1774)
- Merdigera obscura (Müller, 1774)

Clausiliidae

- Balea biplicata (Montagu, 1803)
- Bulgarica cana (Held, 1836)
- Bulgarica vetusta (Rossmässler, 1836)
- Cochlodina laminata (Montagu, 1803)
- Cochlodina orthostoma (Menke, 1830)
- Laciniaria plicata (Draparnaud, 1801)
- Macrogastra borealis (Boettger, 1878)
- Ruthenica filograna (Rossmässler, 1836)
- Serrulina serrulata (Pfeiffer, 1847)

Ferussaciidae

- Cecilioides acicula (Müller, 1774)

Punctidae

- Punctum pygmaeum (Draparnaud, 1801)

Discidae

- Discus perspectivus (Megerle von Mühlfeld, 1816)

Euconulidae

- Euconulus fulvus (Müller, 1774)

Gastrodontidae

- Zonitoides nitidus (Müller, 1774)

Zonitidae

- Aegopinella minor (Stabile, 1864)
- Aegopinella pura (Alder, 1830)
- Nesovitrea petronella (Pfeiffer, 1853)
- Oxychilus glaber (Rossmässler, 1835)
- Vitrea contracta (Westerlund, 1871)
- Vitrea crystallina (Müller, 1774)
- Vitrea diaphana (Studer, 1820)

Milacidae

- Tandonia kusceri (Wagner, 1931)

Vitrinidae

- Vitrina pellucida (Müller, 1774)

Limacidae

- Lehmannia jaroslaviae Grossu, 1967
- Lehmannia marginata (Müller, 1774)
- Limax cinereoniger Wolf, 1803
- Limax maximus Linnaeus, 1758

Agriolimacidae

- Deroceras agreste (Linnaeus, 1758)
- Deroceras laeve (Müller, 1774)
- Deroceras reticulatum (Müller, 1774)
- Deroceras sturanyi (Simroth, 1894)
- Deroceras turcicum (Simroth, 1894)

Arionidae

- Arion circumscriptus Johnston, 1828
- Arion silvaticus Lohmander, 1937
- Arion subfuscus (Draparnaud, 1805)

Bradybaenidae

- Fruticicola fruticum (Müller, 1774)

Hygromiidae

- Euomphalia strigella (Draparnaud, 1801)
- Helicopsis instabilis (Rossmässler, 1838)
- Helicopsis striata (Müller, 1774)
- Lindholmiola girva (Frivaldszky, 1835)
- Monacha cartusiana (Müller, 1774)
- Monachoides incarnatus (Müller, 1774)
- Monachoides vicinus (Rossmässler, 1842)
- Perforatella dibothrion (Bielz, 1860)
- Pseudotrichia rubiginosa (Rossmässler, 1838)
- Trochulus hispidus (Linnaeus, 1758)
- Xeropicta derbentina (Krynicki, 1836)
- Xeropicta krynickii (Krynicki, 1833)
- Xerolenta obvia (Menke, 1828)

Helicidae

- Arianta arbustorum (Linnaeus, 1758)
- Cepaea vindobonensis (Férussac, 1821)
- Helicigona faustina (Rossmässler, 1835)
- Helix lutescens Rossmässler, 1837
- Helix pomatia Linnaeus, 1758

== Freshwater bivalves ==
Unionidae

- Anodonta anatina (Linnaeus, 1758)
- Anodonta cygnea (Linnaeus, 1758)
- Pseudanodonta complanata (Rossmässler, 1835)
- Sinanodonta woodiana (Lea, 1834)
- Unio crassus Philipsson, 1788
- Unio pictorum (Linnaeus, 1758)
- Unio tumidus Philipsson, 1788

Sphaeriidae

- Musculium lacustre (Müller, 1774)
- Pisidium amnicum (Müller, 1774)
- Pisidium casertanum (Poli, 1791)
- Pisidium henslowanum (Sheppard, 1823)
- Pisidium milium Held, 1836
- Pisidium nitidum Jenyns, 1832
- Pisidium pulchellum Jenyns, 1832
- Pisidium subtruncatum Malm, 1855
- Pisidium supinum Schmidt, 1851
- Sphaerium corneum (Linnaeus, 1758)
- Sphaerium rivicola (Lamarck, 1818)
- Sphaerium solidum (Normand, 1844)

Dreissenidae

- Dreissena polymorpha (Pallas, 1771)
- Dreissena rostriformis (Deshayes, 1838)

Corbiculidae

- Corbicula fluminea (Müller, 1774)

Cardiidae

- Hypanis colorata (Eichwald, 1829)
- Hypanis laeviuscula (Martens, 1874)
- Hypanis plicata (Eichwald, 1829)
- Hypanis pontica (Eichwald, 1838)

== See also ==
Lists of molluscs of surrounding countries:

- List of non-marine molluscs of Romania
- List of non-marine molluscs of Ukraine
