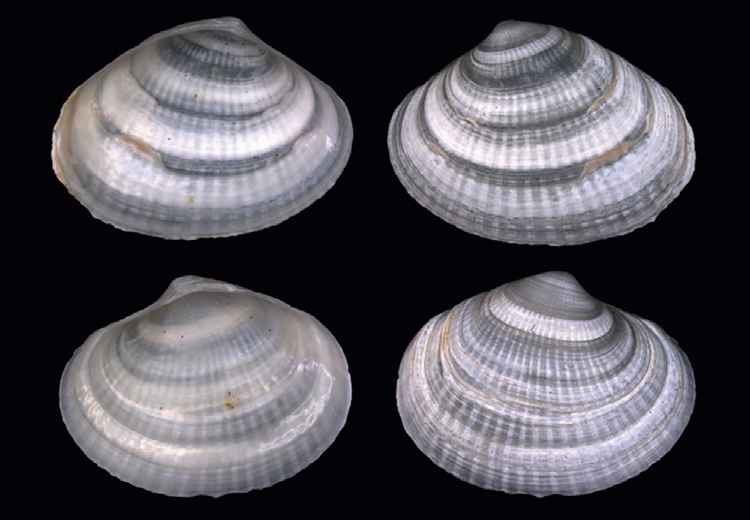
- Shells from the Late Pleistocene deposits of the lower Volga (near Selitrennoye, Russia)

Scientific classification
- Kingdom: Animalia
- Phylum: Mollusca
- Class: Bivalvia
- Order: Cardiida
- Family: Cardiidae
- Genus: Adacna
- Species: A. minima

Binomial name
- Adacna minima Ostroumov, 1907

= Adacna minima =

Species of brackish-water bivalve

Adacna minima is a brackish-water bivalve mollusc of the family Cardiidae, the cockles. It has an oval or rhomboidal, thin, semitranslucent whitish shell, up to 16–20 mm (0.63–0.79 in) in length, with flattened and sometimes almost invisible ribs. The species lives in the southern, middle and rarely in the northeastern parts of the Caspian Sea at depths from 0 to 35 m (0 to 115 ft). It was formerly also widespread in the Aral Sea where it became locally extinct after 1977 due to the shrinkage of the lake and increase in salinity.

== Description ==
Adacna minima has an oval or rhomboidal, thin, compressed, semitranslucent whitish shell, with flattened and sometimes almost invisible radial ribs and a very shallow, wide pallial sinus. The shell length is up to 16–20 mm (0.63–0.79 in). The valves are moderately gaping posteriorly. The hinge has a relatively well developed cardinal tooth in the left valve and a reduced cardinal tooth in the right valve.

Adacna vitrea differs from A. minima by a deeper pallial sinus.

== Distribution and ecology ==
Adacna minima is found in the southern, middle and rarely in the northeastern parts of the Caspian Sea, where it lives at depths from 0 to 35 m (0 to 115 ft). Formerly, it was also widespread in the Aral Sea at depths down to over 10–12 m (33–39 ft). By 1965, as the lake began to desiccate, most specimens of A. minima had deformed shells due to the increased salinity. The species was last seen in the Aral Sea in 1977 and has not been recorded there in the following years.

== Fossil record ==
Adacna minima is abundant in the Late Pleistocene deposits of the lower Volga corresponding to the Hyrcanian stage of the Caspian Sea which began 107,000 ± 7,000 years ago. The species is also found in the Holocene deposits of the Aral Sea.

== Taxonomy ==
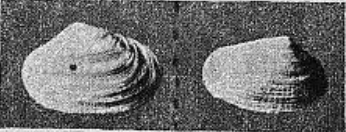

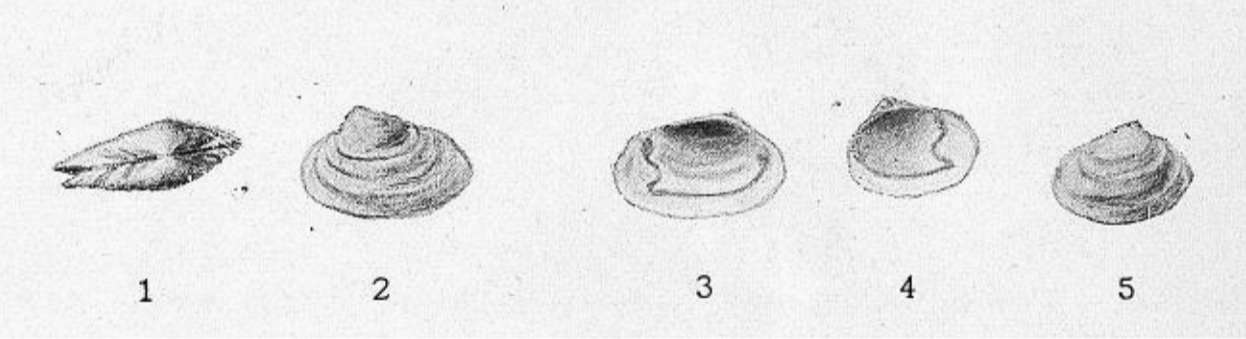
Illustrations of Adacma minima from Ostroumov's publication (1907)

The species was first described from the Northern Caspian Sea and the Aral Sea by Russian zoologist Alexey Alexandrovich Ostroumov in 1907. The type specimens of A. minima have not been traced.

In a 1952 monograph Molluscs of Fresh and Brackish Waters of the USSR Vladimir Ivanovich Zhadin did not list A. minima as a distinct species, but used its name for a variety of Adacna vitrea (A. vitrea var. minima) and indicated that it lives along the northern shore of the Caspian Sea and in the Aral Sea. The names A. minima and A. vitrea var. minima used by some researchers apparently not only referred to A. minima as described by Ostroumov, but also to a distinct Northern Caspian form of A. vitrea. Publications by Boris Mikhailovich Logvinenko and Yaroslav Igorevich Starobogatov in the Atlas of the Invertebrates of the Caspian Sea (1969) and the Atlas of the Invertebrates of the Aral Sea (1974) have established that A. minima and A. vitrea are distinct species, both of which inhabit the Caspian Sea and were formerly present in the Aral Sea. The Northern Caspian form of A. vitrea has been treated as the subspecies A. vitrea glabra.

In 1967 Logvinenko and Starobogatov described the Caspian population of A. minima as the subspecies A. minima ostroumovi (originally as Hypanis minima ostroumovi), with the holotype being collected near Ogurchinskiy Island. Later, Starobogatov (1974) recognized two subspecies of A. minima in the Aral Sea: A. minima minima and the newly described A. minima sidorovi (as Hypanis minima sidorovi). The former lived at depths of over 10–12 m (33–39 ft), while the latter inhabited the coastal zone at depths of up to 10 m (33 ft) and was distinguished by more visible ribs. The lectotype of H. minima sidorovi was found on the western coast of the Aral Sea near the Kara-Kibir well. In a 2003 book on bivalves of the shrinking Aral Sea by S. I. Andreeva and N. I. Andreev the subspecies A. minima sidorovi was regarded as a distinct species (as Hypanis sidorovi) and was distinguished from A. minima and A. vitrea by the shape of the ligament. The type specimens of A. minima ostroumovi and A. minima sidorovi are kept in the Zoological Institute of the Russian Academy of Sciences. F. P. Wesselingh and co-authors (2019) questioned the validity of these subspecies and treated them as junior synonyms of A. minima. J. J. ter Poorten (2024) similarly synonymized these taxa with A. minima, while M. V. Vinarski and co-authors (2024) listed them as valid. Confirmation of the taxonomic status of these subspecies by molecular studies would be difficult due to the likely extinction of the species in the Aral Sea.

== Cited texts ==
- Andreeva, S. I.; Andreev, N. I. (2003). Evolyutsionnyye preobrazovaniya dvustvorchatykh mollyuskov Aral'skogo morya v usloviyakh ekologicheskogo krizisa [The evolutionary transformations of bivalve mollusks of the Aral Sea in the conditions of an ecological crisis] (in Russian). Omsk: Omsk State Pedagogical University. ISBN 5-8268-0672-9.
- Kijashko, P. V. (2013). "Mollyuski Kaspiyskogo morya" [Molluscs of the Caspian sea]. In Bogutskaya, N. G.; Kijashko, P. V.; Naseka, A. M.; Orlova, M. I. (eds.). Identification keys for fish and invertebrates of the Caspian Sea (in Russian). Vol. 1. Fish and molluscs. St. Petersburg; Moscow: KMK Scientific Press Ltd. pp. 298–392. ISBN 978-5-87317-932-9.
- Vinarski, M. V.; Kantor, Y. I. (2016). Analytical catalogue of fresh and brackish water molluscs of Russia and adjacent countries. Moscow: A. N. Severtsov Institute of Ecology and Evolution of Russian Academy of Sciences. ISBN 978-5-9908840-7-6.
