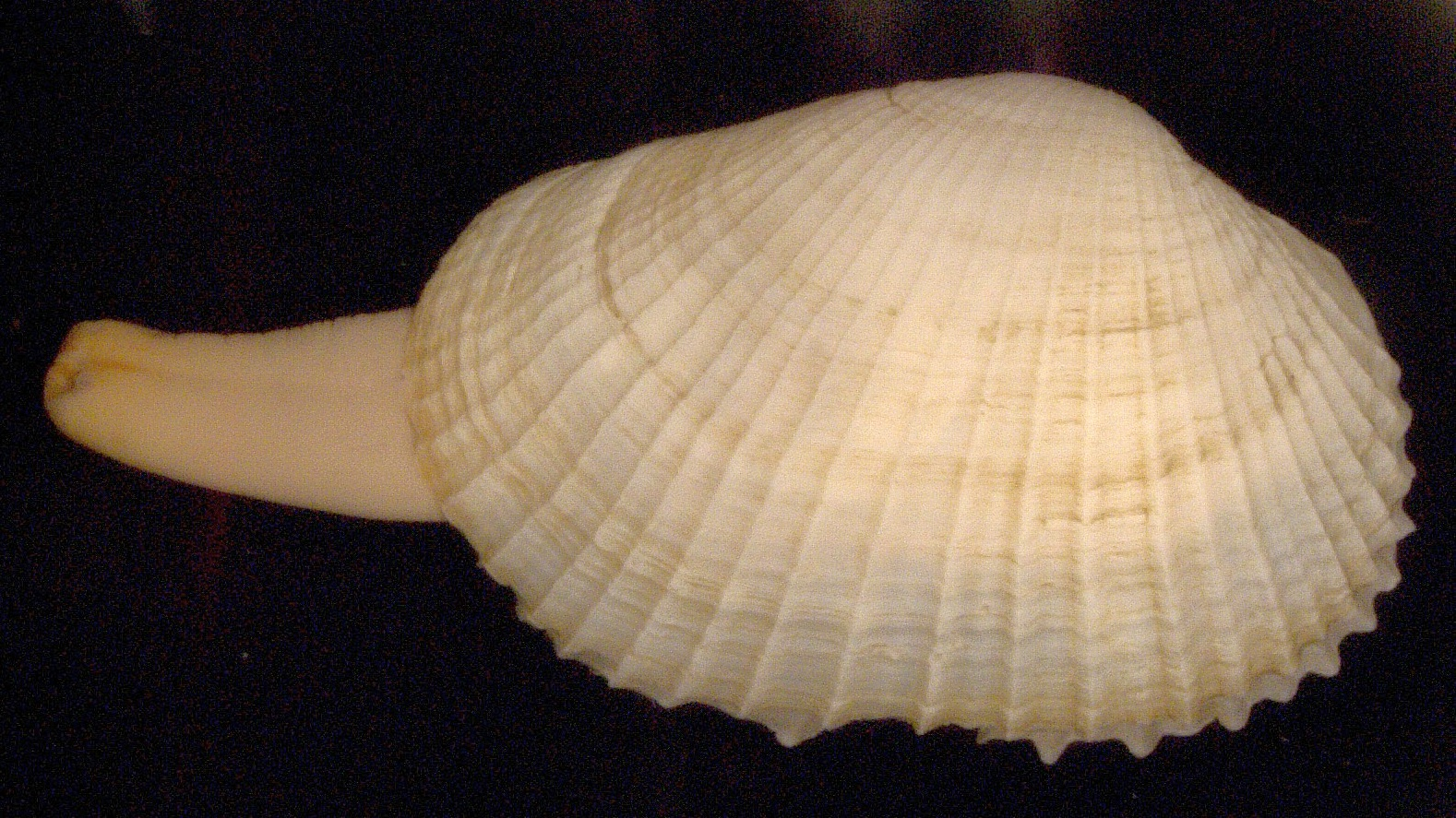

Scientific classification
- Kingdom: Animalia
- Phylum: Mollusca
- Class: Bivalvia
- Order: Cardiida
- Family: Cardiidae
- Genus: Hypanis
- Species: H. plicata

Binomial name
- Hypanis plicata (Eichwald, 1829)

Synonyms
- List: Adacna grimmi Andrusov, 1923; Adacna relicta Milaschewitsch, 1916; Adacna relicta var. dolosmiana Borcea, 1926; Hypanis plicata golbargae Tadjalli-Pour, 1977; Hypanis regularis Starobogatov, 2004; Pholadomya crispa Agassiz, 1842

= Hypanis plicata =

Species of brackish-water bivalve

Hypanis plicata, the folded lagoon cockle, is a brackish-water bivalve mollusc of the family Cardiidae and is the only living member of the genus Hypanis. It has an oval, thin, semitranslucent shell, up to 30–45 mm (1.2–1.8 in) in length, with irregularly placed sharp ribs. The species is found in the shallow parts of the Caspian Sea and was formerly common in estuaries and lagoons of the northwestern coast of the Black Sea, including the Razelm–Sinoe Lagoon complex, the Dniester Liman and the Dnieper–Bug Estuary. As of the 21st century, the Black Sea populations have largely declined due to human-driven salinity changes and may have become extinct. H. plicata is a mobile filter feeder that burrows into soft sediments or bores deep into hard clay, leaving its long, fused siphons on the surface and feeding on plankton and suspended detritus. The structure of its shell and the ability to bore into solid substrates resemble bivalves of the family Pholadidae, which is believed to be a result of convergent evolution. The species typically lives at depths down to 30 m (98 ft). It is considered edible. Its larvae, juveniles and adults likely act as a food source for bottom-feeding fish.

== Taxonomy ==
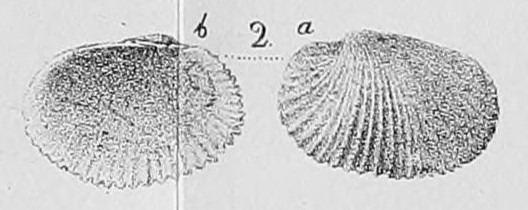
Illustrations of Glycymeris plicata from Eichwald's publication (1829)

The species was first described as Glycymeris plicata by Russian naturalist Karl Eichwald in 1829. Its type locality is the southern coast of the Caspian Sea near Astrabad (Gorgan, Iran). Five specimens collected by Eichwald from this locality are kept in the Zoological Institute of the Russian Academy of Sciences and one of them was selected as the lectotype of the species by Pavel Vladimirovich Kijashko in 2013. The species is commonly known as the folded lagoon cockle.

The genus Hypanis was introduced in 1832 by Christian Heinrich Pander in a publication by Édouard Ménétries and only included Hypanis plicata, making it the type species of the genus by monotypy. Hypanis lacked a diagnosis and only a reference to Eichwald's description of G. plicata was provided.

In 1838 Eichwald included G. plicata in the genus Adacna. This was commonly accepted by later authors until the second half of the 20th century. Researchers such as Nicolai Ivanovich Andrusov and Vladimir Ivanovich Zhadin placed the species in the subgenus Hypanis within Adacna, while Lidiya Aleksandrovna Nevesskaja recognized Hypanis as a distinct genus in a 1963 article. In the 1969 Atlas of the Invertebrates of the Caspian Sea, Boris Mikhailovich Logvinenko and Yaroslav Igorevich Starobogatov regarded Adacna and Monodacna as subgenera of Hypanis, with H. plicata being included in the subgenus Hypanis sensu stricto. In a 2004 publication, Starobogatov and co-authors separated Adacna from Hypanis and treated Monodacna as a subgenus of the former. Büyükmeriç and Wesselingh (2018) considered Hypanis, Adacna and Monodacna to be distinct genera, which has been accepted in subsequent works.

H. plicata is the sole living member of the genus Hypanis. The other recognized species included in this genus is the extinct Hypanis andrussowi known from the Early Pleistocene (Apsheronian) deposits of Azerbaijan and Turkmenistan.

=== Synonyms ===
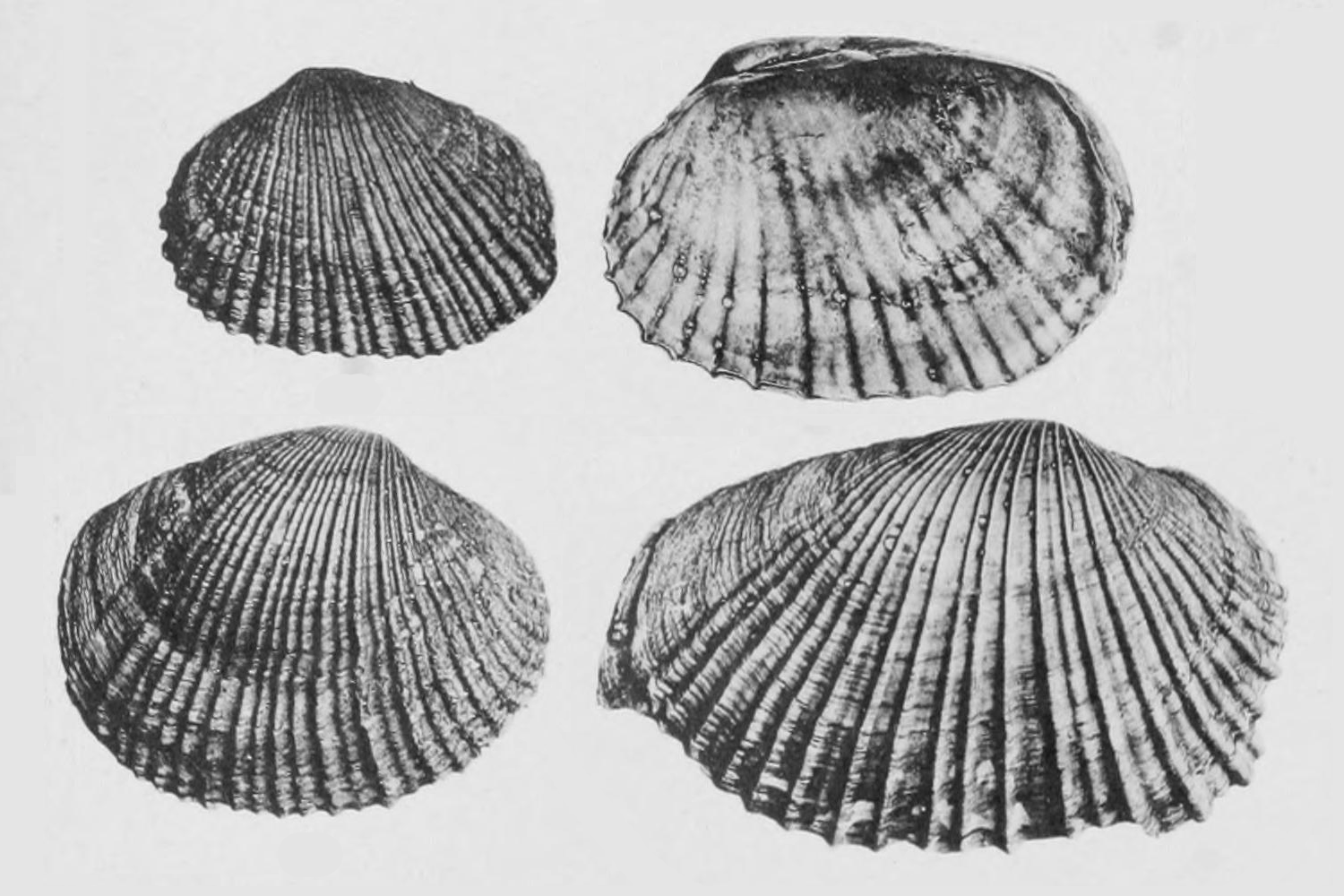
Photos of Adacna relicta from its original description (1916)

In 1842, Louis Agassiz described the bivalve Pholadomya crispa from the Caspian Sea. In 1849, Alexander von Middendorff established that Ph. crispa is a junior synonym of H. plicata, placing the species and some other Caspian bivalves in the genus Pholadomya due to the structure of their shells and the long, fused siphons.

After describing G. plicata from the Caspian Sea, Eichwald later reported it in the Dniester Liman of the Black Sea, referring to this population as the variety major. In 1916, Konstantin Osipovich Milaschewitsch described the Dniester Liman population as the new species Adacna relicta. Zhadin (1952) regarded A. relicta as a variety of H. plicata, while Nevesskaja (1965), as well as Scarlato and Starobogatov (1972), recognized it as the subspecies H. plicata relicta. Starobogatov et al. (2004) once again considered it to be a distinct species, H. relicta, but this view was not supported by Kijashko (2013), who retained it as a subspecies since the only distinguishing feature of H. plicata relicta indicated by Nevesskaja was the deeper pallial sinus. In 2019 Wesselingh and co-authors synonymized A. relicta with H. plicata and noted that molecular studies would be necessary to clarify the taxonomic status of the Black Sea populations.

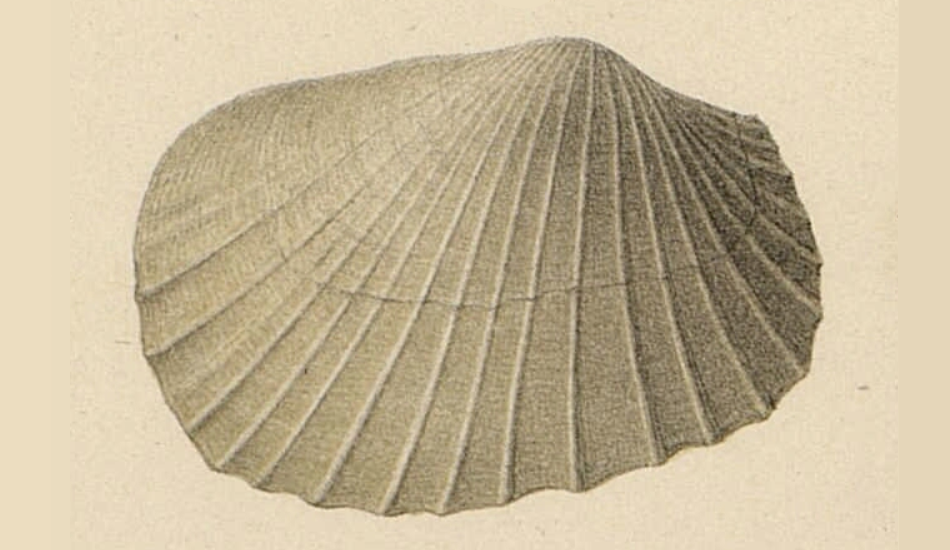
Figure of Adacna plicata from a 1877 publication by Grimm. This specimen was redescribed as Adacna grimmi in 1923 and as Hypanis regularis in 2004.

Adacna grimmi is a species distinguished by more widely spaced ribs that was described by Andrusov (1923) from the Apsheronian deposits of Azerbaijan and from a modern Caspian specimen illustrated in a 1877 publication by Oscar Andreevich Grimm. This taxon was recognized by some subsequent authors, but was treated as a synonym of H. plicata by Logvinenko and Starobogatov (1969).

In 1926, Ioan Borcea described the variety Adacna relicta var. dolosmiana from the Lake Golovița near Cape Doloşman and distinguished it by a less elongated or almost circular shell. Scarlato and Starobogatov (1972) treated it as a distinct species, H. dolosmiana. Wesselingh et al. (2019) synonymized the variety with H. plicata.

Tadjalli-Pour (1977) described the subspecies Hypanis plicata golbargae from the Iranian coast of the Caspian Sea near Astara and Tālesh. It has been treated as a synonym of H. plicata by Wesselingh et al. (2019).

Hypanis regularis is a name introduced by Starobogatov et al. (2004) which was once again used to describe Grimm's illustration of the Caspian H. plicata. Since this specimen was already redescribed by Andrusov in 1923, this makes H. regularis a synonym of A. grimmi, which in turn is a synonym of H. plicata.

== Description ==
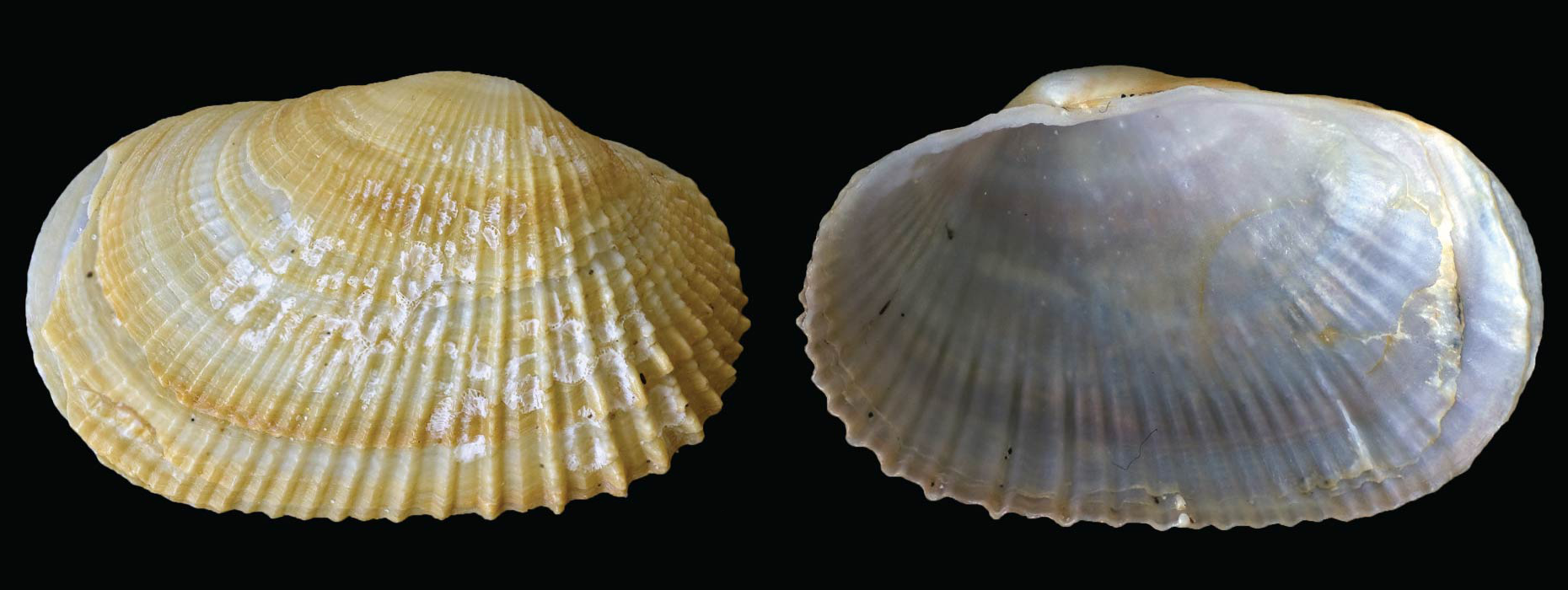
Shell of Hypanis plicata from the Caspian Sea (Dagestan, Russia).

Hypanis plicata has an oval, thin, compressed, semitranslucent shell, which has gaps along the anterior and posterior margins when closed. The shell possesses a low and anteriorly displaced umbo, 30–41 irregularly placed sharp radial ribs that sometimes bear scales on the anterior margin, and a deep pallial sinus that extends up to 1/3 of the shell length. The length of the shell is up to 30–45 mm (1.2–1.8 in). The coloration is white, with a thin, semitranslucent light grayish periostracum and sometimes with cream, yellowish or pink concentric bands. The hinge either lacks teeth or consists of a single poorly developed tooth below the umbo of the right valve.

The siphons of this species are fused together and are longer than its shell when fully extended. The foot is relatively short.

== Distribution ==
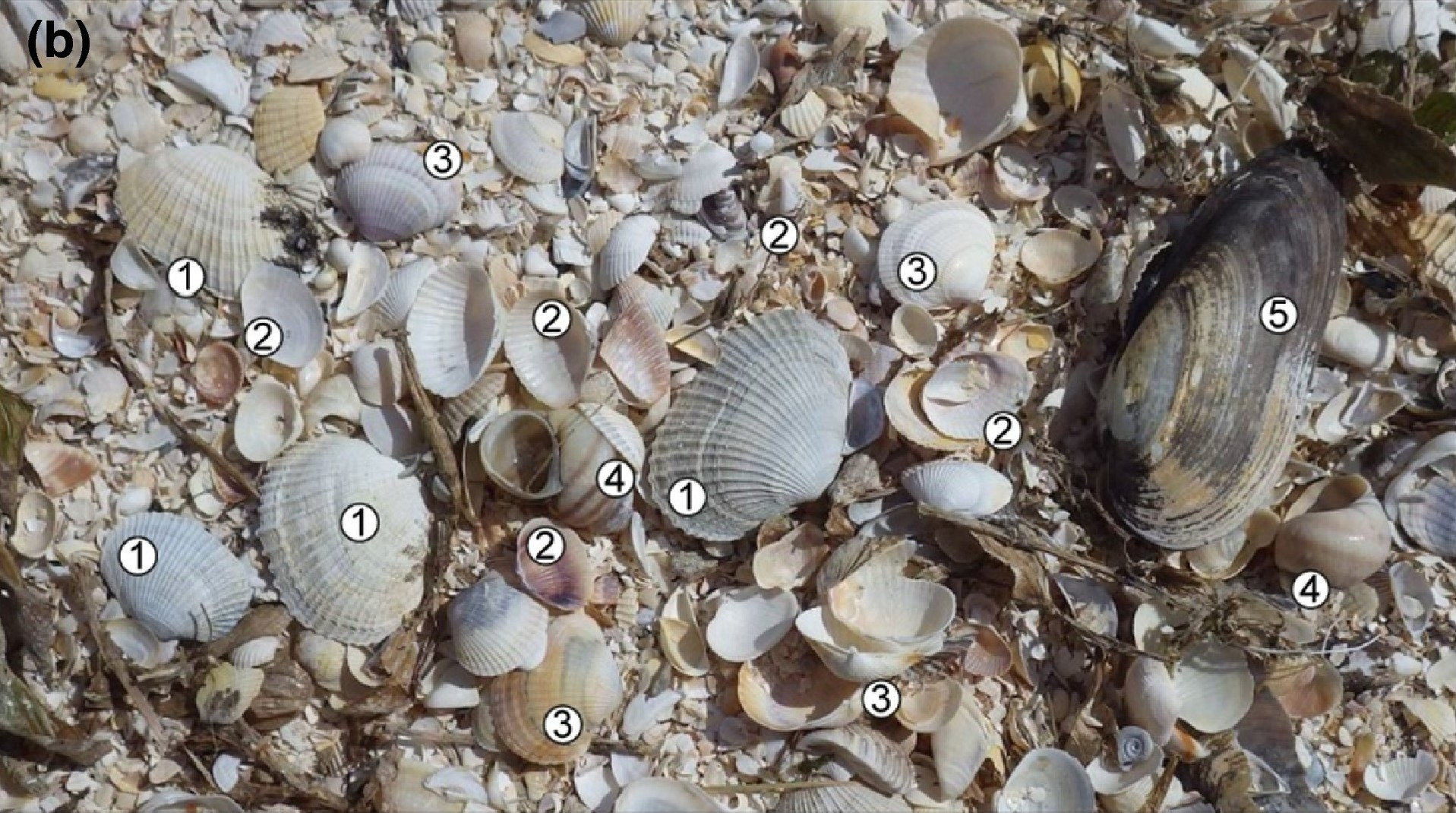
Shell residue of Lake Razelm showcasing the locally extinct Hypanis plicata (No. 1) and other declining molluscs (No. 2–3), which have been replaced by freshwater species (No. 4–5).

Hypanis plicata is widely distributed in the shallow parts of the Caspian Sea. Formerly, it was also common in estuaries and lagoons of the northwestern coast of the Black Sea, including the Razelm, Golovița and Sinoe lagoons, the Dniester Liman and the portion of the Dnieper–Bug Estuary between Nova Odesa and Mykolaiv. As of the 21st century, the Black Sea populations of H. plicata have largely declined due to human activity. In the Razelm–Sinoe Lagoon complex the species disappeared after 2004 due to rerouting of the Danube and closing of the Black Sea inlets in the second half of the 20th century, which led to a decrease in salinity and to the replacement of brackish-water species by freshwater ones. It may also be extinct in the Dniester Liman, which has been affected by changes in salinity caused by the creation of a sea canal and by the construction of dams. Similarly, dam construction along the Dnieper in the 20th century has disrupted the salinity gradient of the Dnieper–Bug Estuary, where H. plicata has since become very rare or may be locally extinct.

In 2005, several empty shells of H. plicata and a single individual with damaged soft parts were found in the lower Don near Porechny Island at a depth of 2.5 m (8.2 ft). These specimens were presumably introduced from the Caspian Sea, but it is uncertain whether the species is able to survive in freshwater conditions of the Don.

== Ecology ==
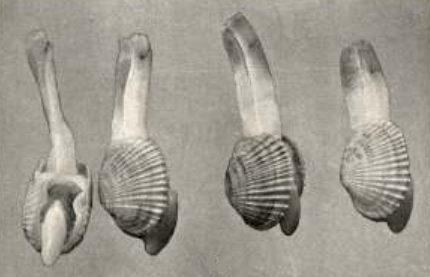
Individuals with extended siphons from Lake Golovița

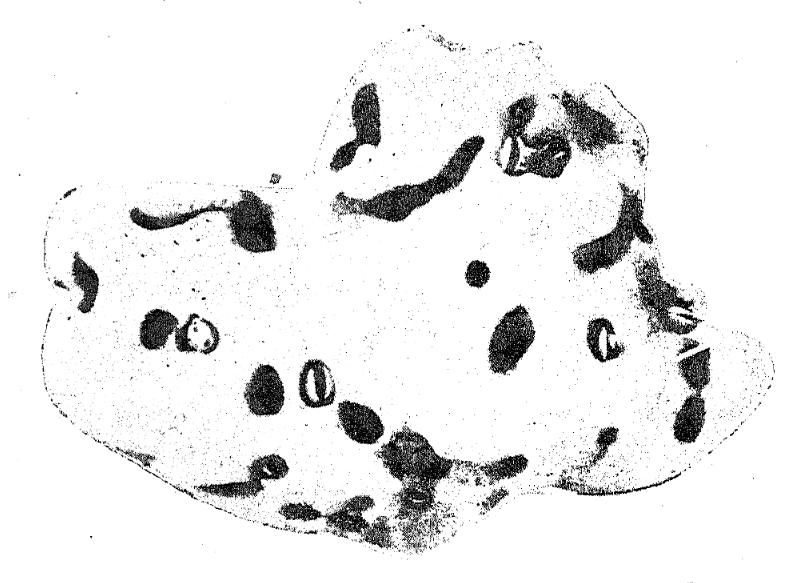
Burrows created by Hypanis plicata in a piece of hard clay

In the Caspian Sea, Hypanis plicata lives in areas with salinity of 4 to 8‰ or possibly up to 12–13‰ at depths down to 30 m (98 ft), rarely down to 50–70 m (160–230 ft). In the Dnieper–Bug Estuary it was restricted to well-oxygenated silty bottoms, where it lived at depths from 0.5 to 10 m (1.6 to 32.8 ft) and was most common and abundant at depths of 2.0–3.5 m (6.6–11.5 ft) at salinities of 0.7–2‰. The species is a mobile filter feeder that burrows into soft, silty or sandy-silty sediments, leaving its long siphons on the surface and feeding on plankton and suspended detritus. It is also capable of boring deep into hard clay substrates, creating elliptical burrows in the process. Reproduction of the species takes place in the warm period. Fertilization is external and the eggs are released in batches.

The ability of H. plicata to bore into hard clay, coupled with the gaps in its shell and the shell's sculpture, resembles bivalves of the family Pholadidae. These similarities in lifestyle and shell characters have been attributed to convergent evolution.

In the Caspian Sea, H. plicata often occurs together with bivalves of the genera Dreissena and Adacna. Prior to its decline and possible extinction in the northwestern Black Sea, the species formed aggregations with the bivalves Adacna fragilis and Monodacna colorata.

Adults, juveniles and planktonic larvae of H. plicata are likely eaten by the Caspian roach (Rutilus caspicus), common bream (Abramis brama) and gobies.

== Fossil record ==
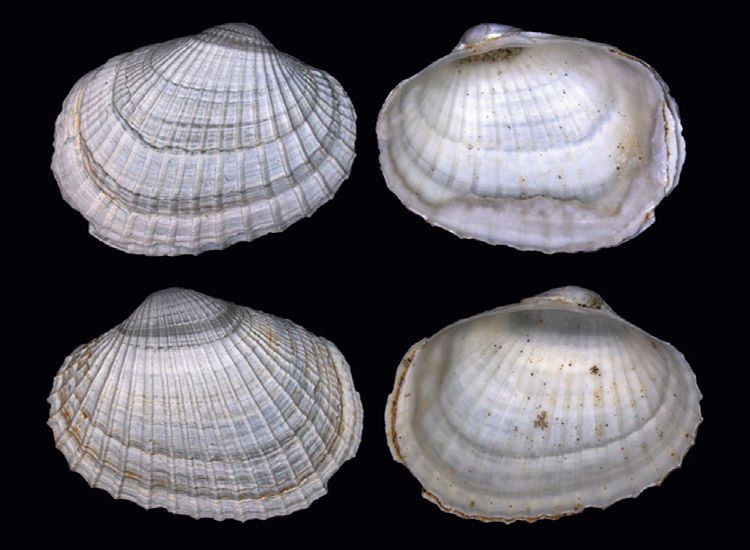
Shells from the Late Pleistocene (Hyrcanian) deposits of the lower Volga

Hypanis plicata occurs in the Early Pleistocene deposits in Azerbaijan, Turkmenistan and to the east of the Sea of Azov. These sediments correspond to the Apsheronian Sea, a large brackish water lake that existed in the location of the modern Caspian Sea from 1.8 or 2.1 million to 880,000–750,000 years ago. The species is also known from the Middle-Late Pleistocene deposits of the late Bakunian (Urundzhikian), Khazarian, Hyrcanian and Khvalynian stages of the Caspian Sea. In the Black Sea, fossil records of H. plicata date back to the sea's brackish Chaudian stage, which began in the Middle Pleistocene.

Two incomplete valves tentatively classified as H. plicata have been found in the Late Pleistocene deposits in south-central Turkey near Karapınar. This mostly dry area used to be occupied by a large lake which disappeared during the Holocene. Here, H. plicata lived together with the fossil bivalves Monodacna pseudocolorata and Adacna yaninae. The estimated age of the fauna containing these molluscs ranges from 35,000 to 43,000 years.

== Uses ==
Hypanis plicata is listed as an edible species in a 2009 cookbook by Russian malacologists D. L. Ivanov and A. V. Sysoev. In a 1954 book, Soviet hydrobiologist Y. M. Markovsky briefly discussed the potential use of H. plicata as a food source for bottom-feeding fish in reservoirs of large rivers, though he was not certain whether the species can reproduce in fresh water.

== Conservation ==
Although the conservation status of Hypanis plicata has not been assessed by the International Union for Conservation of Nature (IUCN), the species has been included in the Red Data Book of Ukraine under the Vulnerable category.

== Bibliography ==
- Kijashko, P. V. (2013). "Mollyuski Kaspiyskogo morya" Моллюски Каспийского моря [Molluscs of the Caspian sea]. In Bogutskaya, N. G.; Kijashko, P. V.; Naseka, A. M.; Orlova, M. I. (eds.). Opredelitel' ryb i bespozvonochnykh Kaspiyskogo morya Определитель рыб и беспозвоночных Каспийского моря [Identification keys for fish and invertebrates of the Caspian Sea] (in Russian). Vol. 1. Fish and molluscs. St. Petersburg; Moscow: KMK Scientific Press Ltd. pp. 298–392. ISBN 978-5-87317-932-9.
- Markovsky, Y. M. (1954). Fauna bespozvonochnykh nizov'ev rek Ukrainy, usloviya yeyo sushchestvovaniya i puti ispol'zovaniya. Chast' 2. Dneprovsko-Bugskiy liman Фауна беспозвоночных низовьев рек Украины, условия ее существования и пути использования. Часть 2. Днепровско-Бугский лиман [The fauna of invertebrates of the lower river streams of Ukraine, its life conditions and ways of utilization. Part 2. The Dnieper-Bug Liman] (in Russian). Kyiv: AN USSR.
- Scarlato, O. A.; Starobogatov, Y. I. (1972). "Klass dvustvorchatyye mollyuski — Bivalvia" Класс двустворчатые моллюски — Bivalvia [Class bivalve molluscs – Bivalvia]. In Mordukhai-Boltovskoy, F. D. (ed.). Opredelitel' fauny Chernogo i Azovskogo morey Определитель фауны Черного и Азовского морей [Guide to the fauna of the Black Sea and the Sea of Azov] (in Russian). Vol. 3. Kiev: Naukova Dumka. pp. 178–249. Archived from the original on 23 January 2026.
