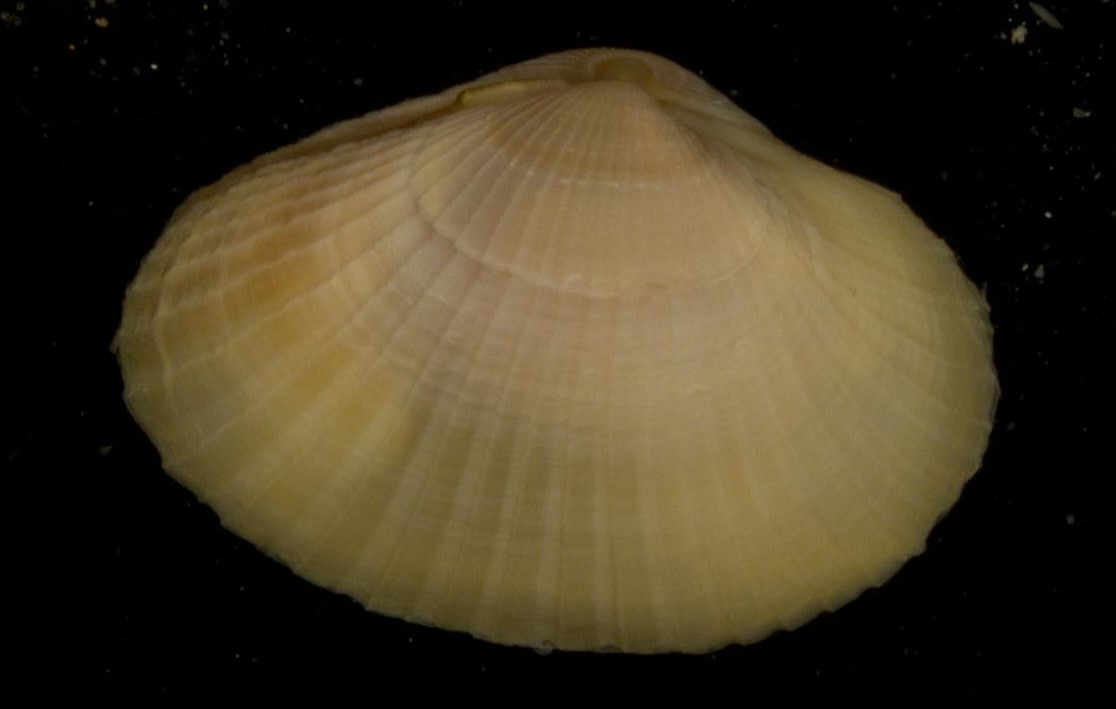

Scientific classification
- Kingdom: Animalia
- Phylum: Mollusca
- Class: Bivalvia
- Order: Cardiida
- Family: Cardiidae
- Genus: Monodacna
- Species: M. colorata

Binomial name
- Monodacna colorata (Eichwald, 1829)

Synonyms
- Adacna luciae Borcea, 1926; Monodacna colorata var. angusticostata Borcea, 1926; Monodacna colorata var. ialpugensis Borcea, 1926; Monodacna colorata var. lucida Borcea, 1926; Monodacna colorata var. razelmiana Borcea, 1926; Monodacna colorata var. tanaisiana Milaschewitsch, 1916

= Monodacna colorata =

Species of brackish and freshwater bivalve

Monodacna colorata, the colored egg cockle, colored lagoon cockle or Azov-Black Sea cockle, is a brackish and freshwater bivalve mollusc of the family Cardiidae. It has a broadly oval, rather thin, whitish, yellowish, pinkish-white, reddish-brown or grayish-lilac shell, up to 40 mm (1.6 in) in length, with oblique triangular ribs. The species is native to freshened areas and limans of the Black Sea and the Sea of Azov. Since the 1950s it has been introduced into the reservoirs of the Dnieper, Manych, Don and Volga rivers, into the Volga Delta, the northern part of the Caspian Sea and some water bodies of Kazakhstan including the Lake Balkhash. M. colorata is a filter feeder that burrows into the soft sediments, feeding on diatoms and detritus. It is considered edible and is eaten by many commercially important fishes.

== Description ==
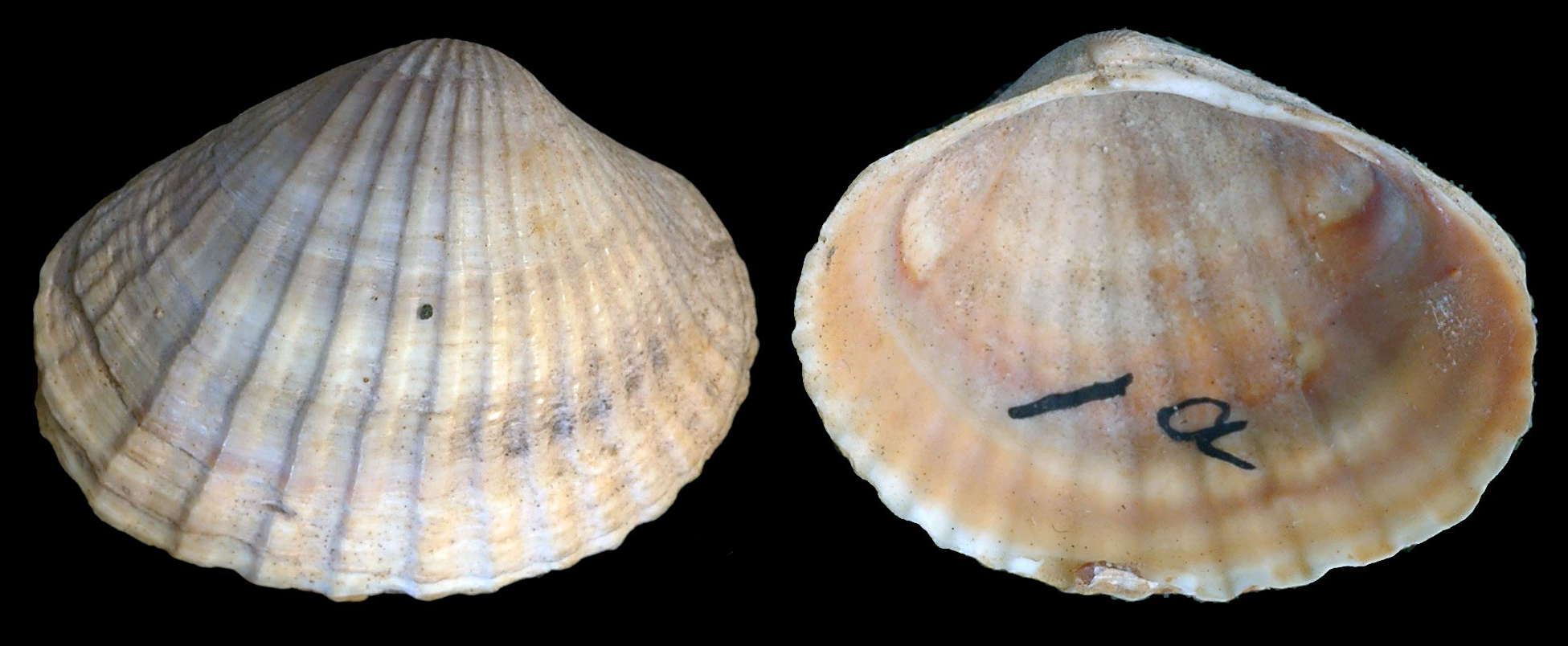
Shell of Monodacna colorata

Monodacna colorata has a broadly oval, rather thin, moderately convex shell, with a low umbo, 21–36 oblique triangular radial ribs and a shallow pallial sinus, which may extend up to slightly over 1/3 of the shell length. The shell length is up to 40 mm (1.6 in), the height is up to 32 mm (1.3 in), and the convexity is up to 19 mm (0.75 in). The valves are conspicuously gaping at the posterior margins, while the anterior gape may be weak. The coloration is whitish, yellowish, pinkish-white, reddish-brown or grayish-lilac, with thin grayish green periostracum and colored concentric bands. The internal coloration matches the exterior, but is deeper. The hinge of both valves consists of a single variably developed cardinal tooth.

Monodacna pontica differs from M. colorata by rounder ribs and less vivid coloration.

== Distribution ==
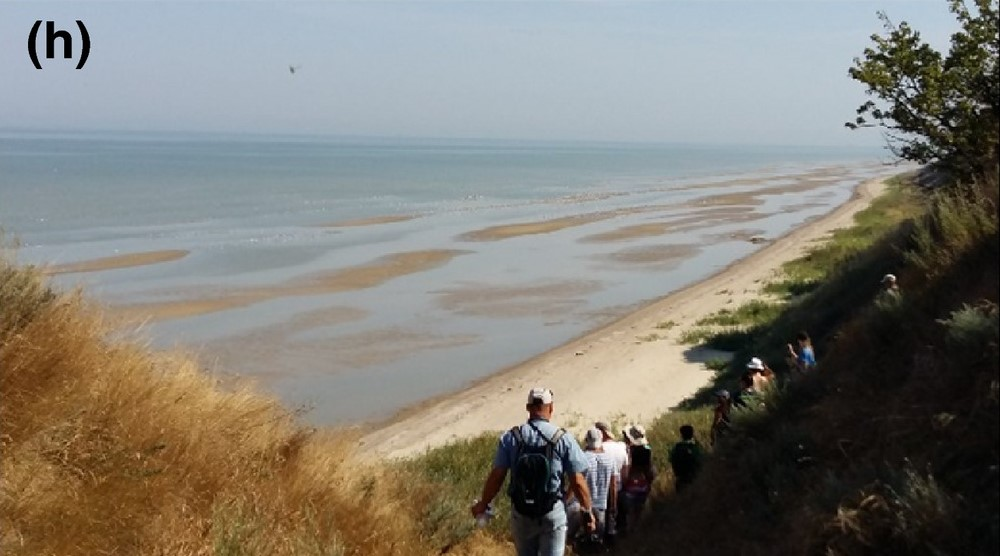
The Taganrog Bay is one of the natural habitats of Monodacna colorata

Monodacna colorata is native to freshened areas and limans of the Black Sea and the Sea of Azov. It inhabits the lakes Kagul, Yalpuh, and Kugurlui, the Razelm-Sinoe Lake complex (Danube Delta), the Kuchurgan, Dniester and Dnieper-Bug limans, the Taganrog Bay, the Mius Liman, the Don Delta, the Kirpilsky, Kurchanskiy, Konovalovskiy, Kulikovskiy, and Polyakov limans of the Kuban Delta and the Temryuk Bay.

M. colorata was once present in the Brates Lake, but became locally extinct in the 20th century due to land conversion. In the Tiligul Liman it disappeared due to a salinity increase caused by construction of a canal which connected the liman with the Black Sea. In the early 20th century the species used to be abundant in the Berezan Liman, but has since disappeared from some localities, although this habitat has not been fully studied. In the Yeysk Liman (Sea of Azov) M. colorata was last recorded in the 2000s and subsequently went extinct due to salinization and eutrophication. In the early 20th century it occurred in the Akhtanizovsky Liman of the Kuban Delta, but was not recorded there in later studies. Additionally, empty shells of this species have been found in the Lake Varna and in the Black Sea littoral sediments in Bulgaria, but it is uncertain whether these shells represent populations that went extinct due to salinization of the lake in the 20th century or older Holocene and Late Pleistocene occurrences.

In 1951–1956 M. colorata was deliberately introduced into the Veselovsky Reservoir of the Manych River. Since 1959 it has been recorded in the northern part of the Caspian Sea in front of the Volga Delta, where it was presumably introduced via ships after the opening of the Volga–Don Canal. The species has since spread into the Volga Delta itself, the reservoirs of the Dnieper River, over the lower course of the Don, into the Tsimlyansk Reservoir, the Karpovskoye, Bereslavskoye and Varvarskoye reservoirs of the Volga–Don Canal, the Volgograd, Saratov and Kuybyshev reservoirs of the Volga and the Bolshoy Irgiz River. Prior to its appearance in the Volga reservoirs, M. colorata has been stocked in the Kuybyshev Reservoir from 1965 to 1970 and initially did not establish, but later invaded the Volgograd and Saratov reservoirs and has been recorded in the Kuybyshev Reservoir since the beginning of the 21st century. Introductions of the species into the Aral Sea in 1964 and 1965 were not successful. Within the Black Sea Basin M. colorata became abundant in the Sasyk Lake, which was previously inhabited by marine species but has been transformed into a brackish water reservoir after getting connected to the Danube, via a canal, in 1978.

In Kazakhstan M. colorata was intentionally introduced to the Lake Balkhash in 1965 and to the Kapchagay Reservoir in the 1970s. Since then it has spread into other water systems of the country such as the Irtysh–Karaganda Canal.

== Ecology ==
Monodacna colorata lives in fresh and slightly brackish water on soft sediments at depths down to 8–12 m (26–39 ft). It occurs in waters with salinity of 0,03–7‰ but can also survive for some time at a salinity level of 12–16‰. The species is a filter feeder that burrows into the sediment and consumes diatoms (Navicula, Coscinodiscus etc.) as well as detritus. In its native habitats M. colorata forms communities with mussels of the genus Dreissena or with brackish water cockles Adacna fragilis and Hypanis plicata. The latter communities have disappeared by the 21st century due to the severe decline of A. fragilis and H. plicata, although large populations of M. colorata and A. fragilis still occur in the Taganrog Bay. In the lower Volga M. colorata has been found together with freshwater mussels of the genera Unio and Anodonta. In the Tsimlyansk Reservoir the species became dominant in its northern part along with the introduced Adacna vitrea glabra.

M. colorata usually starts maturing at the age of two years at a length of 10 mm (0.39 in). Three year old specimens with a length of 20 mm (0.79 in) are considered adult. The species reproduces from late April to September. Females produce about 200,000 eggs and release from several dozen to 50–70 eggs at once. At a temperature of 11–24 °C development from embryo to veliger takes one day. After 14–30 days the veliger settles to the bottom.

An unidentified trematode is known to parasitize on M. colorata.

== Uses ==
Monodacna colorata has been intentionally introduced into various water bodies outside of its native range as an additional food source for fish. It is eaten by many commercially important species including the Azov roach (Rutilus heckelii), common bream (Abramis brama), sturgeons and larvae of Clupeonella. Additionally, the species is considered edible.

== Conservation ==
The conservation status of Monodacna colorata has not been assessed by the International Union for Conservation of Nature. The Kuchurgan Liman population is included in the Red Book of Moldova under the Endangered category as it is threatened by pollution and changes in hydrological cycles. In Russia the species was listed in the Red Data Book of Krasnodar Krai under the Vulnerable category and it was indicated that the only surviving population in the region is restricted to the Kirpilsky Liman, while the Yeysk Liman and Akhtanizovsky Liman populations are extinct. The current status of populations from the other limans of the Kuban Delta is unknown.

== Taxonomy ==
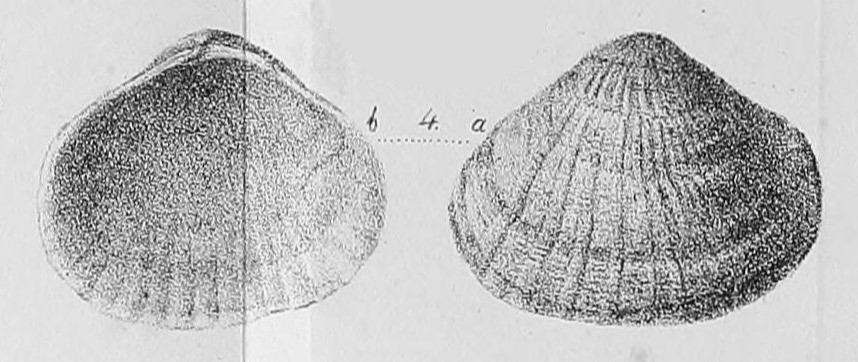
Drawings of Glycymeris colorata from Eichwald's publication (1829)

The species was first described by Karl Eichwald in 1829 as Glycymeris colorata. Its type locality is "Hab. Hypanin fluvium, ad nigrum usque mare" which, according to different authors, either refers to the Kuban River or to the lower course of the Southern Bug River. The type specimens of M. colorata have not been traced.

Monodacna pontica was treated as a synonym of M. colorata by Wesselingh et al. (2019) and the differences in shell characteristics were attributed to different substrate preferences. This opinion was supported by Gogaladze et al. (2021), who indicated M. pontica as a form of M. colorata. J. J. ter Poorten (2024) tentatively regarded M. pontica as a distinct species pending further research.

=== Synonyms ===
Konstantin Osipovich Milaschewitsch (1916) described specimens with thinner shells from the Sea of Azov as the variety tanaisiana. It has been synonymized with M. colorata by Logvinenko and Starobogatov (1969).

I. Borcea (1926) described the species Adacna luciae and several varieties of M. colorata including ialpugensis, angusticostata, lucida and razelmiana. These taxa were not recognized by most subsequent authors. Scarlato and Starobogatov (1972) recognized the species A. luciae, placing it in the genus Hypanis (as Hypanis luciae), and treated the varieties ialpugensis and angusticostata as distinct species, Hypanis ialpugensis and H. angusticostata. The variety lucida was regarded as a synonym of H. colorata, while razelmiana was considered to be a partial synonym of H. angusticostata and H. colorata. Munasypova-Motyash (2006) have questioned the validity of these taxa and only recognized H. angusticostata, distinguishing it from H. colorata by the anatomy of the siphons. Molecular studies by Popa et al. (2011) have shown that H. angusticostata is conspecific with H. colorata. All of the mentioned taxa described by Borcea are currently considered to be synonyms of M. colorata.

== Cited texts ==
- Kijashko, P. V. (2013). "Mollyuski Kaspiyskogo morya" [Molluscs of the Caspian sea]. In Bogutskaya, N. G.; Kijashko, P. V.; Naseka, A. M.; Orlova, M. I. (eds.). Identification keys for fish and invertebrates of the Caspian Sea (in Russian). Vol. 1. Fish and molluscs. St. Petersburg; Moscow: KMK Scientific Press Ltd. pp. 298–392. ISBN 978-5-87317-932-9.
- Logvinenko, B. M.; Starobogatov, Y. I. (1969). "Tip Mollyuski. Mollusca" [Phylum Molluscs. Mollusca]. In Birshteyn, Y. A.; Vinogradov, L. G.; Kondakov, N. N.; Kuhn, M. S.; Astakhova, T. V.; Romanova, N. N. (eds.). Atlas bespozvonochnykh Kaspiyskogo morya [Atlas of the Invertebrates of the Caspian Sea] (in Russian). Moscow: Pishchevaya Promyshlennost. pp. 308–385.
- Scarlato, O. A.; Starobogatov, Y. I. (1972). "Klass dvustvorchatyye mollyuski — Bivalvia" [Class bivalve molluscs – Bivalvia]. In Mordukhai-Boltovskoy, F. D. (ed.). Opredelitel' fauny Chernogo i Azovskogo morey [Guide to the fauna of the Black Sea and the Sea of Azov] (in Russian). Vol. 3. Kiev: Naukova Dumka. pp. 178–249.
- Zhadin, V. I. (1952). Mollyuski presnykh i solonovatykh vod SSSR [Molluscs of Fresh and Brackish Waters of the USSR] (PDF). Opredeliteli po faune SSSR, izdavayemyye Zoologicheskim institutom AN (in Russian). Vol. 46. Moscow–Leningrad: The USSR Academy of Sciences Press. Archived (PDF) from the original on 2 December 2024.
