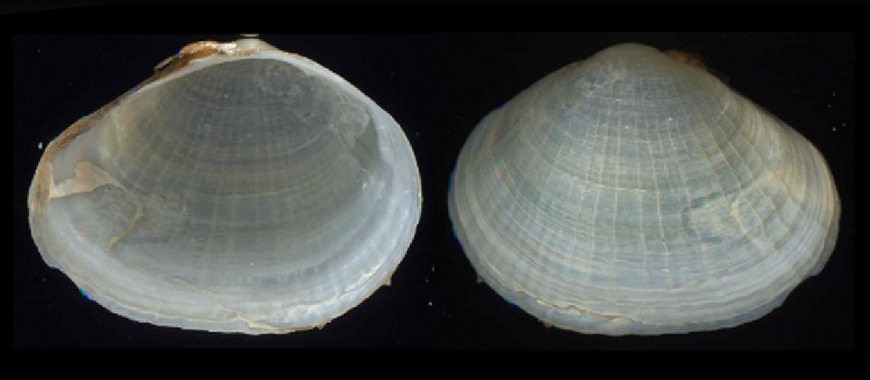
- Shell of Adacna vitrea glabra from the Tsimlyansk Reservoir (Russia)

Scientific classification
- Kingdom: Animalia
- Phylum: Mollusca
- Class: Bivalvia
- Order: Cardiida
- Family: Cardiidae
- Genus: Adacna
- Species: A. vitrea

Binomial name
- Adacna vitrea (Eichwald, 1829)

Synonyms
- Adacna aspera Ostroumov & Rosen, 1905; Adacna vitrea euxinica Nevesskaja, 1963; Amphidesma caspia Krynicki, 1837

= Adacna vitrea =

Species of brackish-water bivalve

Adacna vitrea is a brackish and freshwater cockle, a bivalve mollusc of the family Cardiidae. It has a variably shaped irregularly oval, thin, semitranslucent whitish and often partially pinkish or purple shell, up to 20–28 mm (0.79–1.10 in) in length, with flattened ribs. The species is widely distributed throughout the Caspian Sea where it lives at depths from 0 to 30 m (0 to 98 ft). A distinct form with somewhat more developed ribs and often a whitish coloration of the shell occurs near the Volga Delta and the Ural River and is often considered to be a separate subspecies, Adacna vitrea glabra. This Northern Caspian form has been introduced into the Taganrog Bay of the Sea of Azov and into the Tsimlyansk Reservoir of the Don River. Originally, the species was also present in the Aral Sea where it became locally extinct after 1978 as the lake was shrinking and became more saline due to human activity.

== Description ==
Adacna vitrea has a variably shaped irregularly oval, thin, compressed, semitranslucent shell, with about 27–37 flattened radial ribs and a deep pallial sinus, which extends up to about 1/3 of the shell length or is slightly deeper. The shell length is up to 20–28 mm (0.79–1.10 in). The valves are gaping at the anterior and posterior margins. The coloration is whitish, with the area around the umbo often being tan-orange, pinkish or purple. The hinge may have no teeth or reduced cardinal teeth can be present in both valves.

Adacna fragilis from the Black Sea Basin has stronger developed ribs and lacks the partially pinkish or purple coloration often found in A. vitrea.

== Distribution and ecology ==
Adacna vitrea is widely distributed throughout the Caspian Sea where it lives at depths from 0 to 30 m (0 to 98 ft). A distinct form with somewhat more developed ribs, pointed thread-like crests on the ribs and often a whitish coloration of the shell occurs in the Northern Caspian Sea near the Volga Delta and the Ural River and is usually considered to be a separate subspecies, A. vitrea glabra. This form has been introduced outside of its native range into the Taganrog Bay of the Sea of Azov as well as into the Tsimlyansk Reservoir of the Don River, where it became a dominant species in the upper part of the reservoir together with the introduced Monodacna colorata.

A. vitrea was originally also present in the Aral Sea, where it was only known from single live individuals found near the Amu Darya Delta and empty shells from the western coast of the lake. In 1976–1978 single specimens were seen in the northwestern part of the lake and along the eastern coast at depths of 12–31 m (39–102 ft). At that point the Aral Sea was drying up and becoming more saline due to human activity, and no living specimens of A. vitrea have been found there in 1980 and in the following years.

== Fossil record ==
Adacna vitrea occurs in the Pleistocene deposits corresponding to the Khazarian stage of the Caspian Sea, which began 125,000–80,000 years ago. The species also lived in the Black Sea Basin during its brackish-water Neoeuxinian stage when the Caspian waters flowed into the Black Sea through the Manych strait from 16,000 to 12,500 years ago.

== Taxonomy ==
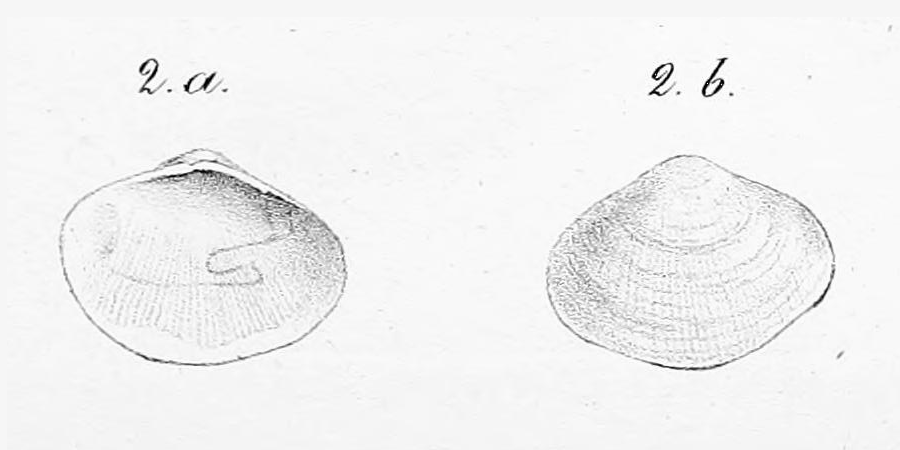
Drawings of Adacna vitrea from Eichwald's publication (1841)

The species was first described as Glycymeris vitrea by Karl Eichwald in 1829. The type locality is the southern coast of the Caspian Sea near Astrabad (Gorgan, Iran). The type specimens have not been traced.

In 1907 A. A. Ostroumov described the species Adacna minima from the Northern Caspian Sea and the Aral Sea. It was not listed as a distinct species by Zhadin (1952) who used its name for a variety of A. vitrea (A. vitrea var. minima) and indicated that it lives along the northern shore of the Caspian Sea and in the Aral Sea. Later authors have treated A. vitrea and A. minima as distinct species both of which inhabit the Caspian Sea and were previously present in the Aral Sea.

Logvinenko and Starobogatov (1969) have recognized two subspecies in the Caspian Sea: A. vitrea vitrea and A. vitrea glabra. The former is found in the central, southern and northeastern parts of the sea, while the latter lives in the western and northern parts of the Northern Caspian Sea near the Volga Delta and the Ural River. The name A. vitrea glabra was originally used for the species Adacna glabra which was described by Ostroumov (1905) from the Dniester Liman. Starobogatov et al. (2004) have recognized the Northern Caspian A. vitrea glabra as a distinct species, A. glabra, but this view was not supported by Kijashko (2013) who once again treated it as a subspecies of A. vitrea. Wesselingh et al. (2019) have questioned the validity of A. vitrea glabra and synonymized it with A. vitrea, while Gogaladze et al. (2021) argued that it is distinct from A. vitrea as they differ by shell characteristics and salinity preferences. The subspecies was also regarded as valid by Vinarski et al. (2024). The taxonomic status of A. vitrea glabra needs to be clarified by molecular studies.

Starobogatov (1974) described the Aral Sea population of A. vitrea as the subspecies A. vitrea bergi (originally as Hypanis vitrea bergi). Its holotype was found on the western coast of the Aral Sea near the Kara-Kibir Well and is kept in the Zoological Institute of the Russian Academy of Sciences. Similarly to A. vitrea glabra, the taxonomic status of this subspecies is uncertain and it is sometimes treated as a synonym of A. vitrea.

=== Synonyms ===
The species Amphidesma caspia described by I. A. Krynicki (1837) from the Caspian Sea was treated as a synonym of A. vitrea by Eichwald (1841). Amphidesma caspia as well as Adacna aspera described by Ostroumov and Rosen (1905) were both treated as synonyms of A. vitrea glabra by Logvinenko and Starobogatov (1969) and as synonyms of A. vitrea by later authors.

Adacna vitrea euxinica is a subspecies described by Nevesskaja (1963) from the Pleistocene deposits of the Black Sea Basin. The holotype is kept in the Paleontological Institute of the Russian Academy of Sciences. J. J. ter Poorten (2024) synonymized this subspecies with A. vitrea.

== Cited texts ==
- Kijashko, P. V. (2013). "Mollyuski Kaspiyskogo morya" [Molluscs of the Caspian sea]. In Bogutskaya, N. G.; Kijashko, P. V.; Naseka, A. M.; Orlova, M. I. (eds.). Identification keys for fish and invertebrates of the Caspian Sea (in Russian). Vol. 1. Fish and molluscs. St. Petersburg; Moscow: KMK Scientific Press Ltd. pp. 298–392. ISBN 978-5-87317-932-9.
- Logvinenko, B. M.; Starobogatov, Y. I. (1969). "Tip Mollyuski. Mollusca" [Phylum Molluscs. Mollusca]. In Birshteyn, Y. A.; Vinogradov, L. G.; Kondakov, N. N.; Kuhn, M. S.; Astakhova, T. V.; Romanova, N. N. (eds.). Atlas bespozvonochnykh Kaspiyskogo morya [Atlas of the Invertebrates of the Caspian Sea] (in Russian). Moscow: Pishchevaya Promyshlennost. pp. 308–385.
- ter Poorten, J. J. (2024). A taxonomic iconography of living Cardiidae. Harxheim: ConchBooks. ISBN 978-3-948603-48-9.
