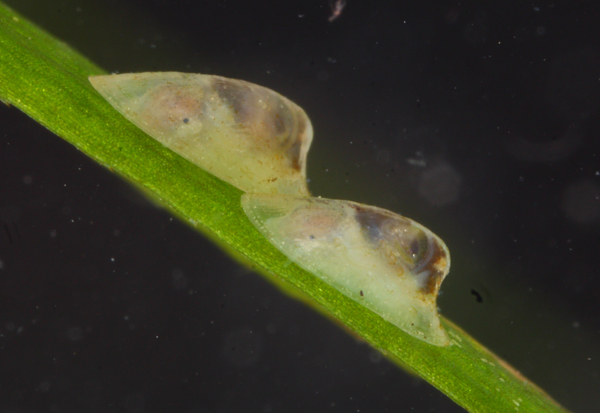
- Ferrissia californica

Conservation status
- Least Concern (IUCN 3.1)

- Secure (NatureServe)

Scientific classification
- Kingdom: Animalia
- Phylum: Mollusca
- Class: Gastropoda
- Superorder: Hygrophila
- Family: Planorbidae
- Genus: Ferrissia
- Species: F. californica

Binomial name
- Ferrissia californica (Rowell, 1863)

Synonyms
- Ancylus (Ferrissia) hendersoni B. Walker, 1908; Ancylus (Ferrissia) novangliae B. Walker, 1908; Ancylus caurinus W. Cooper, 1860 (nomen nudum); Ancylus caurinus J. G. Cooper, 1870; Ancylus fragilis Tryon, 1863; Ancylus obliquus Shimek, 1890; Ancylus pumilus Sterki, 1900; Ancylus sharpi Sykes, 1900; Ancylus shimeki Pilsbry, 1890 (replacement name); Ferrissia (Kincaidilla) fragilis (Tryon, 1863)· accepted, alternate representation; Ferrissia bartschi B. Walker, 1920; Ferrissia fragilis (Tryon, 1863); Ferrissia japonica Habe & J. B. Burch, 1965 (a junior synonym); Ferrissia sharpi (Sykes, 1900); Ferrissia wautieri (Miroli, 1960); Gundlachia (Kincaidilla) japonica J. B. Burch, 1964 (a junior synonym); Gundlachia californica Rowell, 1863 (original combination); Gundlachia meekiana Stimpson, 1863; Gundlachia stimpsoniana S. Smith in S. Smith & Prime, 1870; Pettancylus sharpi (Sykes, 1900); Watsonula wautieri Mirolli, 1960

= Ferrissia californica =

Species of gastropod

Ferrissia californica is a species of small freshwater limpet, an aquatic gastropod mollusk in the family Planorbidae.

== Description ==
This species has a limpet like shell. In captivity the shell is clear but in the wild it is light to dark brown.

== Distribution ==
This species originates from North America. It is introduced in several countries and islands including:

- Czech Republic
- Bulgaria
- Austria
- Spain
- Moldova
- Germany
- Netherlands
- Poland
- Slovakia
- Great Britain
- Portugal
- Algeria
- Japan
- Australia
- and others

== Habitat ==
Ferrissia californica lives in streams, rivers, lakes, ponds, etc. It can be found on rocks, wood debris, aquatic plants, and dead leaves.

== Diet ==
Ferrissia californica eats mostly diatoms.

== Life cycle ==
Ferrissia californica is a obligate self-fertilizer. It lays eggs that are 0.6 mm and contain one juvenile. The eggs hatch in about seven days. They mature at between four and five weeks. Adults are about 2 mm.

== Human use ==
Ferrissia californica is found in the aquarium trade and is considered an aquarium pest.
