= Porechny Island =

Island in Rostov Oblast, Russia

Geography
- Location: Ust-Donetsky District of Rostov Oblast, Don River
- Coordinates: 47°19′29″N 40°24′36″E

Administration
- Russia

Porechny Island (Russian: Остров Поречный) is a river island situated at the Don River, Rostov Oblast, Russia.

== Description ==
The island has an area of 660 hectares and the form of a triangle, which resembles human's heart. The island was formed due to a fault in the geological crust. It stands on a plate of the North-Donetsk ridge; this fact explains the geomagnetic phenomena that affect the flora and fauna. On the territory of the island there are two lakes, which are almost dried up due to the warm climate.

The island has very diverse landscapes. There are zones of steppe and savannah, deserts and forests. Here are habitat white-tailed eagle and cormorant which are listed in the Red Book. In 2000 the island was included in the list of archaeological monuments of Rostov Oblast, but still it hasn't been put under official state protection. The scientists began to explore the island in the 1990s.

Landscapes of Porechny Island are depicted in the paintings of Vasily Surikov. In July 1893, he draw sketches for his work "The Conquest of Siberia by Ermak" while residing at Porechny.

== History ==
It is presumed that on the island were settlements of people in the Stone, Bronze and Iron ages, as well as in the Middle Ages, during the Great Migration in Europe: in the 5th century the island was invaded by the Huns.

The island was the first military center of the Don Cossacks. In the island town were held meetings of atamans, where they discussed where to go on next a military campaign. And during the reign of Ivan the Terrible there was the idea to build a proper city: the atamans wrote about the fact that the island had enough construction timber for the purposes of urban development.

Historians in the archives of the times of Ivan the Terrible found his correspondence with the Don Atamans. One of the oldest documents dates back to 1570. The tsar sent a letter to the atamans, proposing a military alliance and service to the Moscow state, for which he promised a reward.

== Archaeological site ==
Matyukhin hillock is of the greatest archaeological value on the island. In 1994, Rostov archaeologist Alexander Smolyak discovered there a unique burial of catacomb culture. Inside it was a strongly decayed skeleton in a crooked position, on its right side, its head facing east. The bottom of the cell was covered with ocher. It was found out that the remains belong a Bulgar, who lived in 670 AD. The peculiarity of the find is that the funeral set of the warrior remained untouched - iron armor, bow with bone trim, decorated with a pattern, a two-handed sword, and a quiver with arrows. The handle of the sword is decorated with a blue stone. Later, the researchers concluded that this two-meter knight was the main commander of Khan Asparuh.

In addition, on the Matyukhin hillock the researchers found several twin burials of men and women. However, in recent years, the island has often become a victim of black diggers, which excavated most of valuable materials.
