= Selitrennoye =

Selitrennoye Селитренное
- Selo
- Interactive map of Selitrennoye
- Location within Astrakhan Oblast Location within Russia
- Coordinates: 47°10′N 47°27′E
- Country: Russia
- Region: Astrakhan Oblast
- District: Kharabalinsky District
- Time zone: UTC+4:00

Selitrennoye (Russian: Селитренное) is a rural locality (a selo) and the administrative center of Selitrensky Selsoviet, Kharabalinsky District, Astrakhan Oblast, Russia. The population was 1,978 as of 2010. There are 23 streets.

== Geography ==
Selitrennoye is located 34 km southeast of Kharabali (the district's administrative centre) by road. Volnoye is the nearest rural locality.
