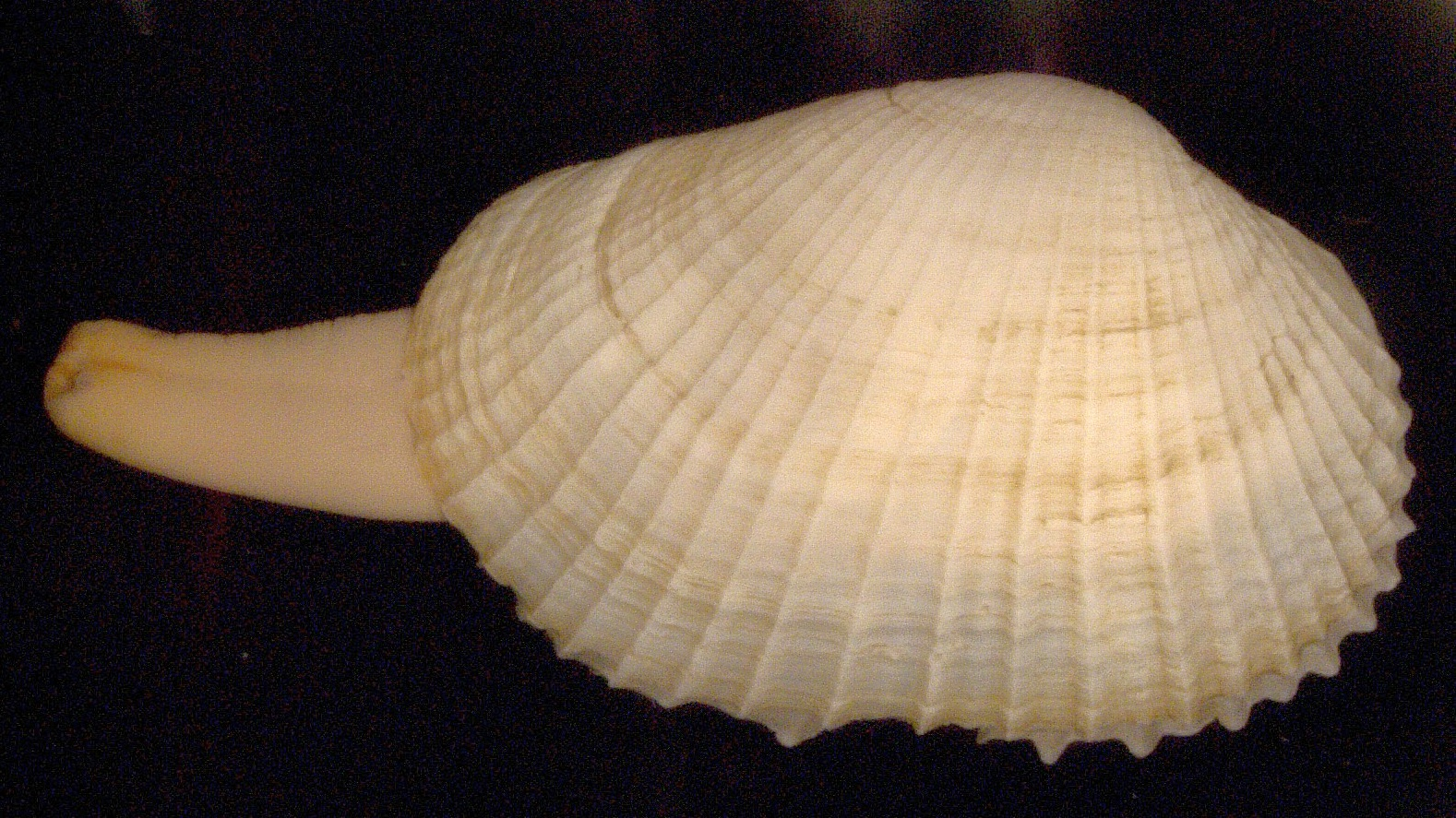
- Hypanis plicata

Scientific classification
- Kingdom: Animalia
- Phylum: Mollusca
- Class: Bivalvia
- Order: Cardiida
- Family: Cardiidae
- Tribe: Adacnini
- Genus: Hypanis; Ménétries, 1832

= Hypanis (bivalve) =

Genus of molluscs

Hypanis is a genus of bivalves belonging to the family Cardiidae.

The species of this genus are found at Black Sea.

Species:

- Hypanis andrussowi (Kolesnikov, 1950)
- Hypanis dolosmiana (Borcea, 1926)
- Hypanis plicata (Eichwald, 1829)
