= Pallial line =

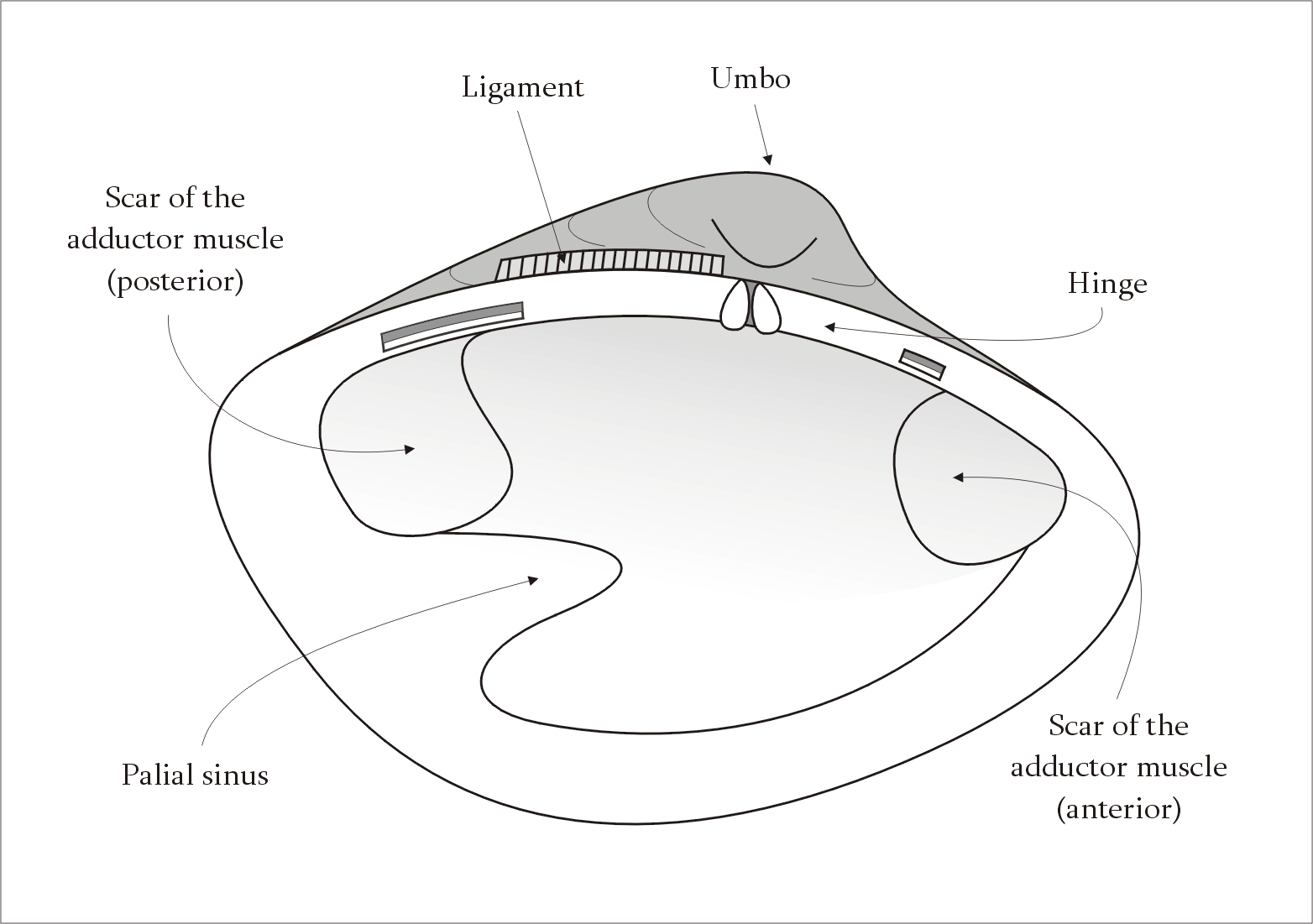
Diagram of the internal shell structure of the left valve of bivalve resembling a venerid in which the pallial line is shown

The pallial line is a mark (a line) on the interior of each valve of the shell of a bivalve mollusk. This line shows where all of the mantle muscles were attached in life. In clams with two adductor muscles the pallial line usually joins the marks known as adductor muscle scars, which are where the adductor muscles attach.

The position of the pallial line is often quite clearly visible as a shiny line on the slightly more dull interior surface of the bivalve shell.
