= Liman (landform) =

Russian term for an estuary lagoon formed by a sandbar at a river's mouth

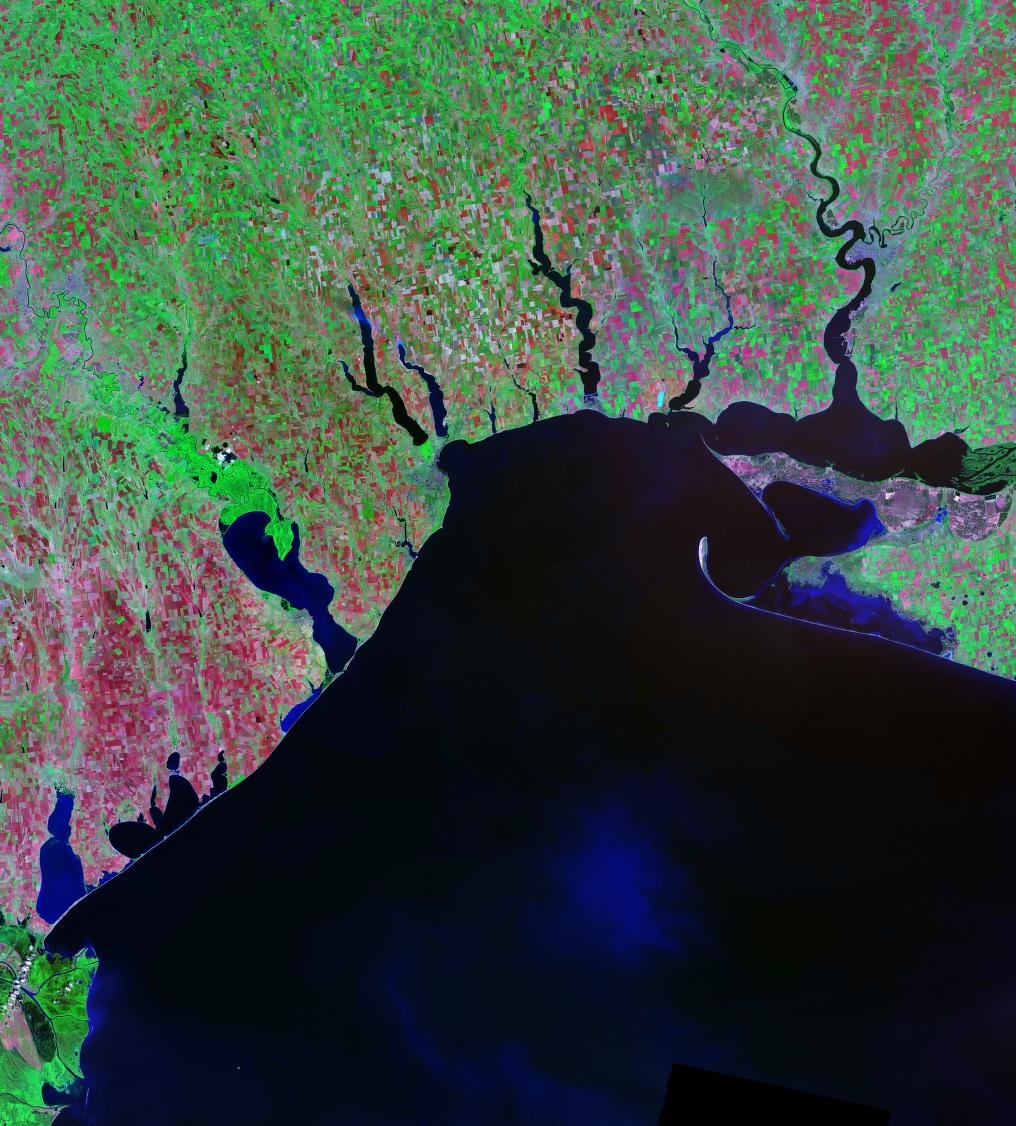
Landsat satellite photo of limans along the Black Sea coast

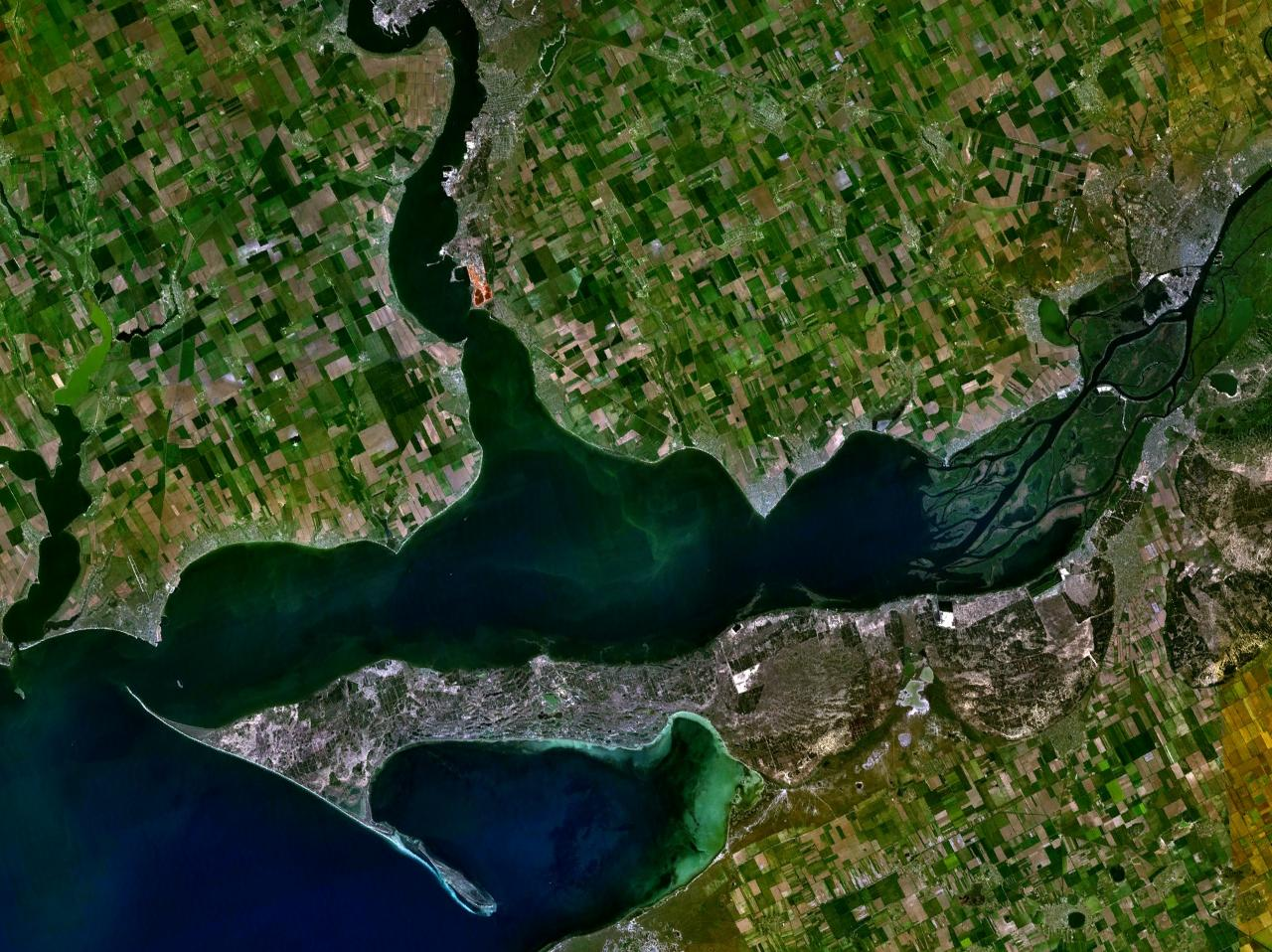
Liman forming the Dnieper River and Southern Bug river estuaries

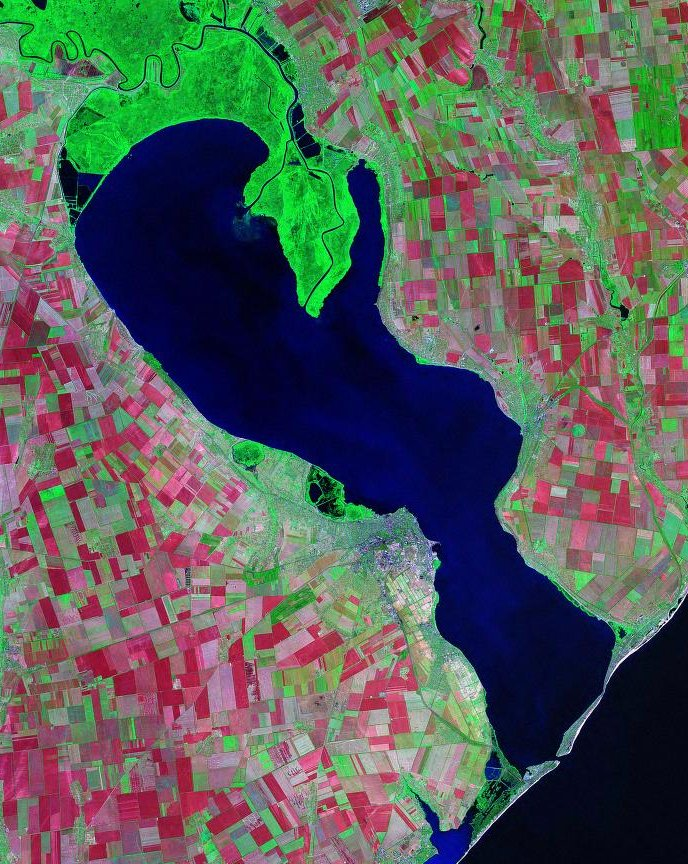
Dniester Liman forming the Dniester river estuary

A liman is a wide estuary formed as a lagoon at the mouth of one or more rivers where flow is constrained by a sediment bar created by sea or river current. The hydrological term comes from the Russian language and is used in various national and regional languages for estuary lagoons all around the Black Sea and Sea of Azov coasts.

A liman is classified as either maritime or fluvial: "maritime" if its sediment bar was formed by sea current; "fluvial" if the bar is created by obstructed flow in a saturated river.

Water in a liman is brackish with variable salinity. During periods of reduced fresh water intake, an especially deep liman or a liman at a very wide river mouth will have a higher salinity than its narrower and shallower counterparts due to greater seawater inflow and evaporation.

Examples of Black Sea limans include the Dniester Liman and the Razelm Liman (Lake Razelm). The Russian name for the liman's mouth bar is peresyp. The term guba (губа) is used for non-significantly blocked estuaries in the Russian North.

== Etymology ==
"Liman" comes from the Greek: λιμήν/λιμάν, romanized: limin/liman for "bay" or "port". The word next appeared as Turkish: liman, then as Russian: лиман, romanized: liman (Russian pronunciation: [lʲɪˈman]). The English term "limnology", meaning the study of inland aquatic ecosystems, is related to "liman" through the shared Greek root for "lake" or "sea", Greek: λιμήν, romanized: límnē—rendered in English as "limno–" or "limn–".

== Distribution ==
Limans are most prevalent on the western and northern Black Sea coasts; these are areas with low tidal ranges. Examples include: Lake Varna in Bulgaria; Lake Razelm in Romania; the Dniester Liman in Ukraine; and Lake Büyükçekmece and Lake Küçükçekmece in Turkey.

Russians also use the term "liman" for lagoons not on the Black Sea, for example the Anadyrskiy Liman and Amur Liman in Siberia.

== See also ==
- Natural harbour
- Ria
