= Karl Eichwald =

Baltic German polymath (1795–1876)

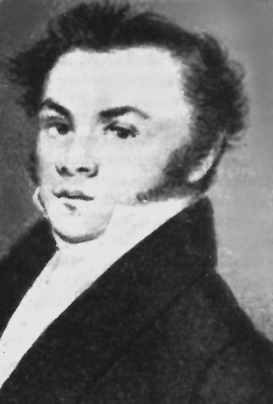
- Born: 4 July 1795; Jelgava (German: Mitau), present-day Latvia
- Died: 10 November 1876 (aged 81); St. Petersburg, Russia
- Citizenship: Russian Empire
- Known for: Describing new reptile species
- Scientific career
- Fields: Geology; Medicine
- Institutions: Kazan University, Vilnius University, St. Petersburg University
- Author abbrev. (botany): Eichw.

Karl Eduard von Eichwald known as Karl Eichwald (Russian: Эдуард Иванович Эйхвальд, Eduard Ivanovich Eykhvald; 4 July 1795, in Mitau, Duchy of Courland and Semigallia – 10 November 1876, in Saint Petersburg) was a Baltic German geologist, physician, and naturalist, who lived his whole life in the Russian Empire.

== Career ==
Eichwald was a Baltic German born at Mitau in Courland Governorate. He became a doctor of medicine and professor of zoology in Kazan in 1823; four years later professor of zoology and comparative anatomy at Vilnius; in 1838 professor of zoology, mineralogy and medicine at St. Petersburg; and finally, professor of palaeontology in the institute of mines in that city.

He travelled much in the Russian Empire, and was a keen observer of its natural history and geology. He died at St. Petersburg.

Eichwald was a supporter of Darwinism.

== Works ==
His published works include Reise auf dem Caspischen Meere und in den Caucasus, 2 volumes (Stuttgart and Tübingen, 1834-1838); Die Urwelt Russlands (St Petersburg, 1840-1845); Le Lethaea Rossica, ou Paléontologie de la Russie, 3 volumes (Stuttgart, 1852-1868), with Atlases.

In the scientific field of herpetology he described several new species of reptiles.

== See also ==
- List of Baltic German scientists
