= Pallial sinus =

Bivalve mollusk anatomic feature

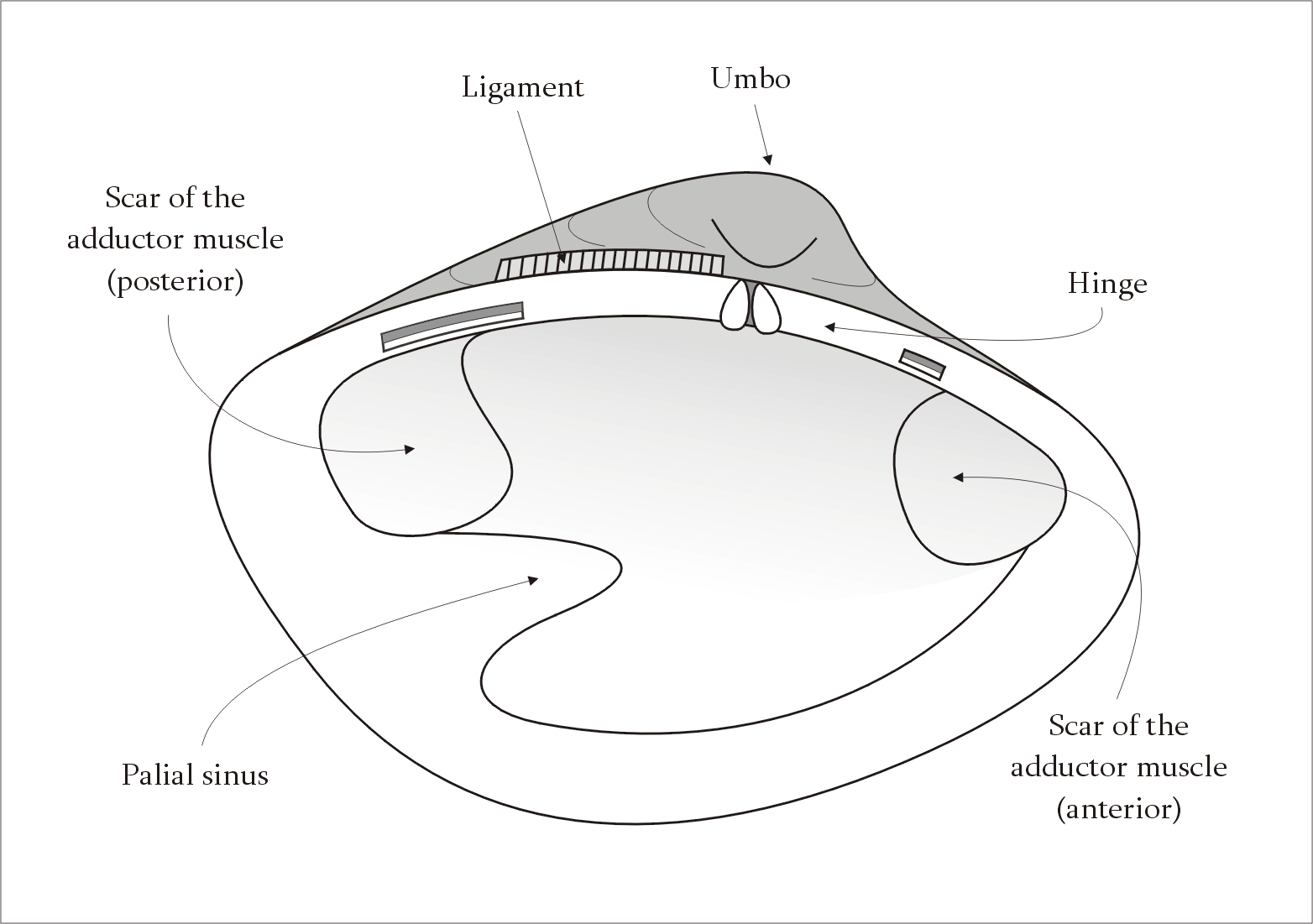
Diagram of the internal shell structure of the left valve of bivalve resembling a venerid in which the pallial sinus is shown.

The pallial sinus is an indentation or inward bending in the pallial line on the interior of a bivalve mollusk shell's valves that corresponds to the position of the siphons in those types of clams which have siphons (i.e. siphonate). The position of the pallial sinus is often clearly visible as a shiny line on the inside of the bivalve shell.
