= Kedrov =

Kedrov (Russian: Кедров, from кедр meaning cedrus) is a Russian male surname, its feminine counterpart is Kedrova. It may refer to:

- Bonifaty Kedrov (1903–1985), Soviet researcher, philosopher, logician, chemist and psychologist
- Konstantin Kedrov (1942–2025), Soviet and Russian poet, philosopher, and literary critic
- Lila Kedrova (1918–2000), Russian-born French actress
- Mikhail Nikolayevich Kedrov (1894–1972), Soviet theatre director
- Mikhail Sergeevich Kedrov (1878–1941), Soviet politician
- Nikolay Kedrov Sr. (1871–1940), Russian composer of liturgical music
- Nikolay Kedrov Jr. (1905–1981), Russian composer of liturgical music
