= Conus (surname) =

Conus, also Konyus (Russian: Коню́с) is a Russian surname of the family of musicians of French origin. Notable people with the surname include:

- Georgi Conus (1862–1933), Russian composer, brother of Julius and Lev
- Julius Conus (1869–1942), Russian violinist and composer, brother of Georgi and Lev
- Lev Conus (1871–1944), Russian pianist, music educator, and composer, brother of Georgi and Julius
- Natalia Conus (1914–1989) Russian ballet dancer, choreographer, Honored Artist of the RSFSR
- Serge Conus (1902–1988), Russian pianist and composer, son of Julius
