= Serge Conus =

Russian composer

Serge Yulievitch Conus (Russian: Серге́й Юльевич Коню́с; October 18, 1902 – October 26, 1988) was a Russian pianist and composer who performed in the United States and Europe.

== Biography ==
=== Early life ===
Conus was born in Moscow to composer Julius Conus of French origins and a Russian mother, Zoya Vladimirovna née Voronina. His musical family also included his grandfather Eduard Conus, a professor at the Moscow Conservatory, and fellow professor and composer uncles Georges and Leon Conus. He began studying piano at the age of four and wrote his first composition at the age of six. At seven, he composed a piece for piano and voice, and a gavotte, which he would later play for the Princess Heiress of Italy.

After obtaining his Baccalaureate degree at the Russian gymnasium of Essentuki, Conus left Russia in 1920 and rejoined his parents and his brother Boris in Paris, France. The famed photographer Boris Lipnitzki documented Conus during his time in Paris, along with other artists in the late 1930's. He continued his musical studies in the piano at the National Conservatory, with the famous pianists Isidor Philipp and Alfred Cortot as his teachers.

=== Religious awakening ===
Shortly after his studies at the Paris Conservatory, Conus left his family for Bulgaria where he spent two years in monasteries. He became the bell ringer of the Saint Alexander Cathedral in Sofia. His burgeoning faith in Russian Orthodoxy prodded him to enter University of Sofia's theological program, where he obtained his degree in Theology in 1929.

He continued his piano and composition studies, encouraged by the Polish Ministry of Sofia to pursue a musical career in Warsaw, Poland. There he gave a series of "soirées musicales" in the private homes of Polish aristocrats.

=== Performances in Europe ===
Conus stayed in Warsaw from 1929 to 1933, and then returned to Bulgaria where he gave a series of recitals in concert halls and on the radio.

In 1936, he studied in Vienna, Austria, with Paul von Kohn, professor and student of Anton Rubinstein. In the following years, he gave a great number of widely acclaimed concerts throughout Europe in cities such as Vienna, Paris, Rome, Pisa, Florence, and other cities. He played the works of Bach, Beethoven, Chopin, Liszt, Medtner, as well as original compositions. In France at La Rochelle and Cognac, he gave a series of recitals consecrated chronologically to the music of Beethoven and Chopin. In Paris, he was a student of noted pianist Isidor Philipp.

=== Morocco ===
In 1950, he departed for Kenitra, Morocco, where he was a Professor of music for almost ten years, traveling as far as Tunisia and Algeria to teach, and also played in a jazz band.

=== Later years in the United States ===
Conus arrived in the United States in September 1959. He taught for two years at the Boston Conservatory of Music, and gave local private lessons and small concerts throughout the country, though never achieving the same level of fame as he had in Europe. He died of a cerebral hemorrhage in St. Elizabeth's Hospital in Boston in 1988, leaving behind a legacy of unpublished musical works.
