= Conservatoire Rachmaninoff =

Music school in Paris, France

Coordinates: 48.863°N 2.296°E

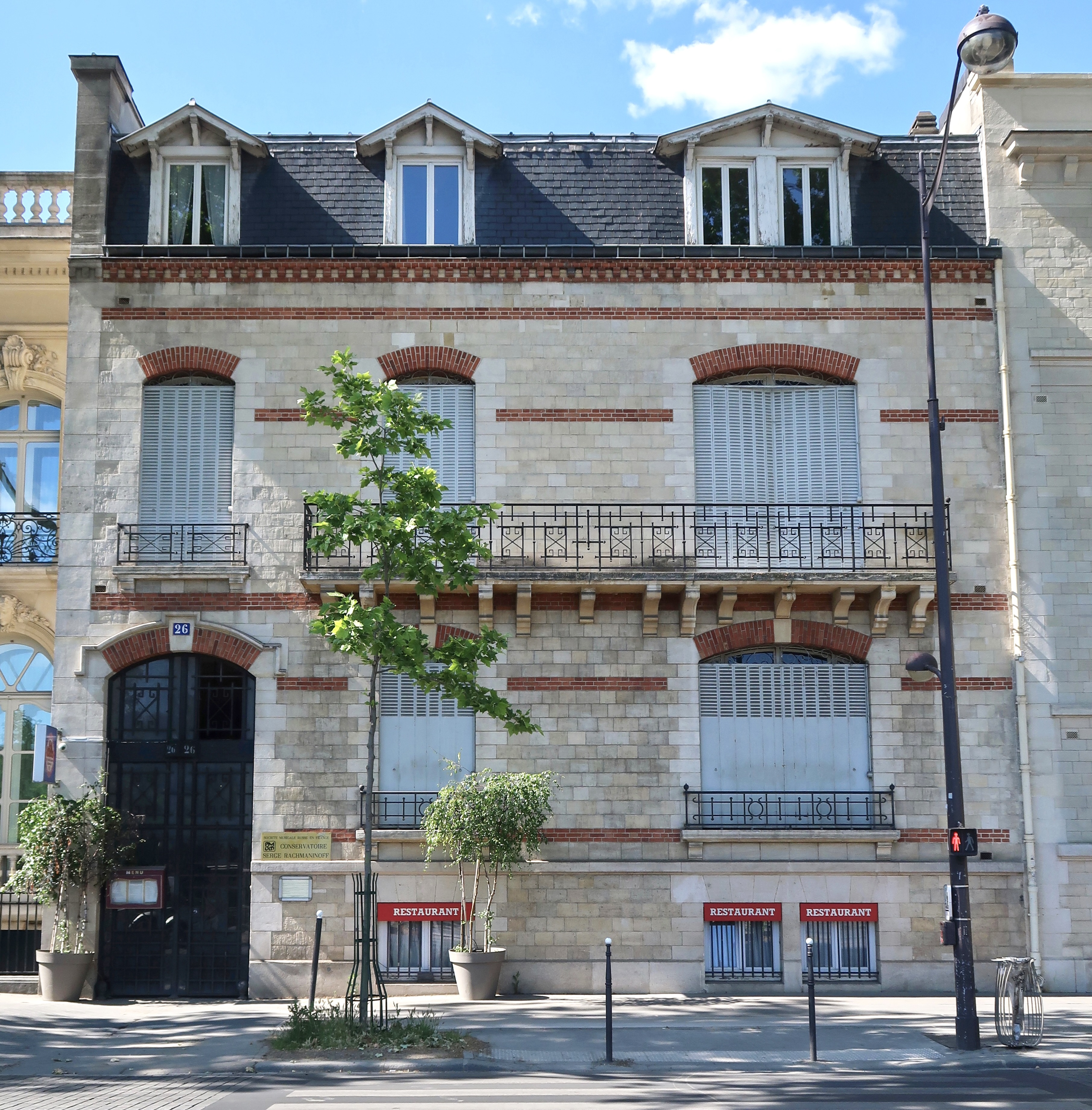
Facade of the conservatoire

The Conservatoire Serge Rachmaninoff de Paris (English translation: Sergei Rachmaninoff Conservatory of Paris) is a professional music school in Paris, which conducts its courses in both French and Russian.

The Conservatoire offers individual instruction in voice and in the standard Western classical musical instruments, as well as in the balalaika and the clarinet in the klezmer and Roma traditions. For studies in music theory, composition, analysis, music history, or theatre (Stanislavski System), pupils attend classes together in groups.

== History ==
The Conservatoire was established between 1923 and 1931 by some of the most illustrious émigré professors from the music schools of Imperial Russia, who included Feodor Chaliapin, Alexander Glazunov, Alexander Gretchaninov, and Sergei Rachmaninoff. Rachmaninoff was the institution's first honorary president and later became its namesake.

The first Director of the Conservatoire, was invited Serge Wolkonsky. Then the directors were elected alternately Nikolai Tcherepnin, composer Pavel Kovalev (1946—1951), composer Arkadj Ougritchitch-Trebinsky (1951—1952), Vladimir Pol etc.

Among the first teachers: Russian musicians Feodor Chaliapin, Nikolai Tcherepnin, Nikolay Kedrov Sr., his wife Sofia Gladkaya (Lila Kedrova's parents), Nikolai Medtner, Alexandra Jacovleva (sister of Alexandre Jacovleff), Yelena Terian-Korganova, Nicolas Zverev, Serge Lifar, Varvara Strakhova, famed brothers Julius Conus, George Conus, and Leon Conus, Marya Slavina etc.

In 1931, the newly constituted Société musicale russe de France took over the management of the Conservatoire, with the intention of continuing the work of the Russian Musical Society founded in Saint Petersburg in 1859.

Since 1932, the Conservatoire has regularly hosted concerts by prestigious musicians from across the globe, among them Vladimir Horowitz, Nathan Milstein, Gregor Piatigorsky, and Alexander Borovsky. Recognized as a public benefit organization (utilité publique) in 1983, the Société musicale russe de France presided by Count Pierre Sheremetev

From 2011, classical pianist Elizabeth Sombart taught at the Conservatoire.
