= Conus (disambiguation) =

Conus is a genus of marine snails.

Conus may also refer to:

- Conus (surname)
- Saint Conus (died 1200), Benedictine monk and saint
- Contiguous United States (CONUS)
- Conus (Marietta, Ohio), a prehistoric Moundbuilders' mound in Marietta, Ohio, United States
- USS LST-317, a U.S. Navy ship to be converted to landing craft repair ship USS Conus (ARL-44), but the conversion was cancelled
- CONUS Experiment (COherent Neutrino nUcleus Scattering) Experiment, detection of scattering of neutrinos off atomic nuclei

== See also ==
- Conus artery, present in only 45 percent of human hearts
- Conus medullaris or conus terminalis, is the tapered, lower end of the spinal cord
