= Mikhail Kedrov =

Mikhail Kedrov may refer to:

- Mikhail Kedrov (actor) (1894–1972), Soviet stage director, actor and theatrical educator
- Mikhail Kedrov (politician) (1878–1941), Soviet communist politician
- Mikhail Alexandrovich Kedrov (1878–1945), Russian naval officer
