= Nikolay Kedrov Jr. =

Russian composer

Nikolay Nikolayevich Kedrov Jr. (Russian: Николай Николаевич Кедров; died 23 May 1981) was a Russian singer, pianist and composer, the son of Nikolay Kedrov Sr., whom he succeeded as director of the Kedrov Quartet vocal ensemble.

Kedrov was born in Saint Petersburg into a family of musicians. His father, Nikolay, was a singer and composer, and founder of a vocal ensemble, the Saint Petersburg Quartet (later called the Kedrov Quartet) specializing in liturgical music. His mother, Sofia Gladkaya, was a singer at the Mariinsky Theatre. Kedrov had two sisters: Irène (Irina) Kedroff, a well-known soprano, and Lila Kedrova, the actress.

Kedrov entered the Saint Petersburg Conservatory (where his father was a professor), as a pianist. The family left Russia in 1923, settling first in Berlin, where Kedrov continued his studies. They moved to Paris in 1928, where Kedrov's parents were among the founders of the Russian conservatory (now the Conservatoire Rachmaninoff); it was here that Kedrov completed his studies.

In 1930 he joined the Kedrov Quartet, which his father had reformed in Paris, singing tenor. At the outbreak of World War II he joined the French army, but he was captured, taken to Germany, and held prisoner for the duration of the war. His father having died in 1940, Kedrov revived the Quartet in the late 1940s. Between 1950 and 1975, under Kedrov's direction, the Kedrov Quartet played more than 3,000 concerts in France, and toured Europe and the United States.

Kedrov was active as a composer and editor of Orthodox liturgical music, publishing two collections of liturgical chants in London, including his own compositions, and those of other Russian émigré composers.

He died in 1981, and is buried in Sainte-Geneviève-des-Bois Russian Cemetery in Paris.
