= Vera Malycheff =

Russian-French geologist, soil scientist and professor (1886–1964)

- Born: Vera Sergeevna Malysheva; 14 August 1886; St. Petersburg, Saint Petersburg Governorate, Russian Empire
- Died: 4 November 1964 (aged 78); Paris, France
- Burial place: Sainte-Geneviève-des-Bois Russian Cemetery
- Other name: Vera Malychef
- Education: Bestuzhev Courses
- Occupations: Geologist, soil scientist
- Known for: Loess deposits and soil research

Vera Malycheff (Note: Also cited as Malychef.) (née Vera Sergeevna Malysheva; 14 August 1886 – 4 November 1964) was a Russian-born French geologist, mineralogist, soil scientist and professor at the University of Paris. Emigrating to France during the Russian Civil War, Malycheff helped place young Russian students into higher educational institutions in France.

== Early life and education ==
Malycheff was born Vera Sergeevna Malysheva (Russian: Вера Сергеевна Малышева) on 14 August 1886 in St. Petersburg, Saint Petersburg Governorate to Sergei Ivanovich Malyshev, an officer in the Imperial Russian Army, and Ekaterina Ilyinichna (née Kostrevskaya; 1862–1935). In time, Vera's mother remarried Mikhail Fyodorov.

She graduated from Vasileostrovskaya Gymnasium and in 1909, began her studies at the elite Higher Women's Bestuzhev Courses in St. Petersburg, specialising in geology. In 1914, she began working at the school in the department of the geologist Nicolai Ivanovich Andrusov.

During the World War I, she worked as a nurse and was awarded a St. George medal for her bravery. Following that, she served in the Volunteer Army of South Russia, which was formed shortly after the Russian Civil War that followed the Russian October Revolution of 1917.

When the Volunteer Army lost the Civil War, Vera went into exile in Paris in 1920, accompanied by her stepfather, mother and four brothers, who fled Russia, leaving behind their valuables.

== Career ==
Starting life again in France, she changed her name from Vera Malysheva to Vera Malycheff and went to work in the mineralogy laboratory of the National Museum of Natural History and in its Institute of Anthropology.

She lectured at various institutes in addition to the Russian Physics and Mathematics Faculty of the Sorbonne University. Together with V.K. Agafonov, she studied loess deposits and soils in France, Belgian Congo, Gabon, Tunisia, Morocco and other French colonies. She edited and is listed as co-author of some of Valerian Konstantinovich Agafonov’s published monographs on the soils of France and Tunisia.

== Personal life ==
She was known for her concern for the Russian people and was an uncompromising anti-communist. She helped her stepfather who was actively placing young students arriving from Russia into higher educational institutions in France. She also helped to organise the Russian congregation and church built in the Sainte-Geneviève-des-Bois Russian Cemetery cemetery close to Paris in Essone.

Vera Malycheff died on 4 November 1964 in Paris and was buried at the Sainte-Geneviève-des-Bois Russian Cemetery.

== Selected awards ==
- George Medal "for courage," given during the First World War.
- French Academy of Sciences prize for scientific works.

== Selected publications ==
- Agafonoff V., Malychef V. La terre à brique et lergeron (loess récent) du plateau de VilleJuif // CR Acad. sci. Paris. 1925. T. 181. P. 251-253.
- Malycheff V. Contribution d létude des sols du Maroc. Sol brun formé aux dépens des hamris // CR Acad. sci. Paris. 1936. T. 203. P. 1532-1534.
- Malycheff V. Recherches sur les mineraux argileux de quelques loess // CR 70 ^{e} Cong. Soc. sav. Sec. sci. Paris. 1939. P. 293-295.
- Malycheff V. Contribution à l'étude de la fraction argileuse de la terre à brique (Lehm) // CR 84 ^{e} Congr. Soc. sav. Paris. 1959. Paris: Gautier-Villard, 1960.
