= Dorsa Andrusov =

Wrinkle ridge system on the Moon

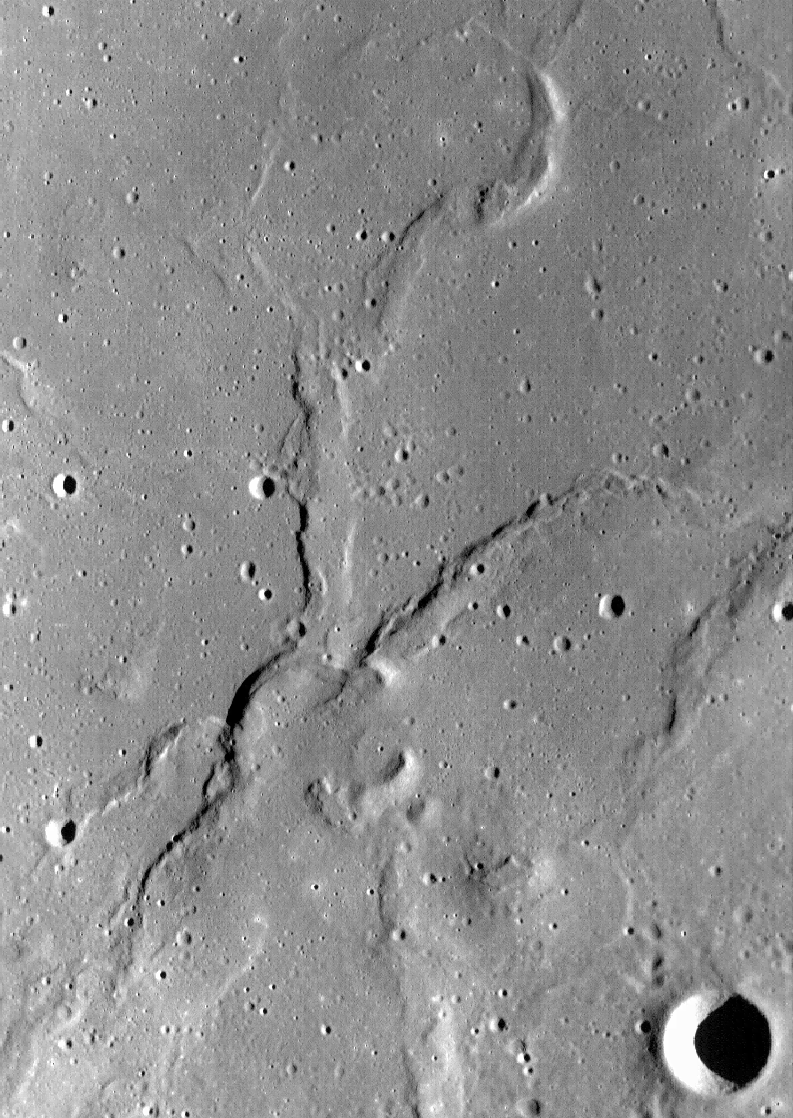
Photo by LRO (50×70 km)

Dorsa Andrusov is a wrinkle ridge system at 1.0°S 57.0°E in Mare Fecunditatis on the Moon. It is 160 km in diameter and was named after Soviet geologist Nicolai Ivanovich Andrusov in 1976 by the IAU.

The ridge starts near Dorsa Geikie, trends northeast, and ends in the vicinity of Webb crater.
