= Viktor Taranovsky =

Russian general (1864–1937)

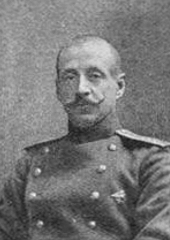
- Taranovsky in 1915
- Born: 12 October 1864
- Died: 7 January 1937 (aged 72) Reims, France
- Allegiance: Russian Empire
- Branch: Imperial Russian Army
- Conflicts: World War I

Viktor Petrovich Taranovsky (Russian: Ви́ктор Петро́вич Тарано́вский) (12 October 1864 – 7 January 1937) was a Russian Major General of the First World War. He served in the Lithuanian Life Guards Regiment of the Russian Imperial Guard and from 1916 commanded the Russian division on the Macedonian front. After the October Revolution his division was largely interned, though some volunteered to fight on the French front. Taranovsky remained in France as a white émigré serving on veterans committees and as assistant rector at the Alexander Nevsky Cathedral, Paris.

== Early career ==
Taranovsky was born on 12 October 1864. He was the second husband of O.F. Taranovskaya and father to P.V. Taranovsky. Taranovsky was a graduate of the Kiev Cadet Corps and the Alexander Military School in Moscow. He rose to become Major General of the Lithuanian Life Guards Regiment of the Russian Imperial Guard.

== First World War ==
Taranovsky commanded the Russian division on the Macedonian front from 1916. Prince Andrei Lobanov-Rostovsky recalled the general's "sharp keen eyes" when meeting him upon first being posted to the division in 1917. After the October Revolution and into the new year discipline in the division broke down and it was interned by the French army at Veria. The men were given the choice, by Taranovsky, of continuing to fight, serving as labourers or being imprisoned in Southern Algeria. Most of the division's officers decided to continue to fight (an 800-man unit of the Russian Legion was formed to fight in France) but the majority of the men refused and chose imprisonment. During the war Taranovsky received the Saint George Sword (formerly the Golden Weapon for Bravery).

== Later life ==
After the war Taranovsky lived in exile as a white émigré in Nice and then Paris, France. He was chairman of his regimental association and of the Union of Officers of the French Front, for whom he started, in 1934, the tradition of a pilgrimage to the Camp de Châlons in Mourmelon-le-Grand, former base of the Russian Legion. Taranovsky was also honorary chairman of a committee to establish a monument at the Russian war cemetery in Saint-Hilaire-le-Grand, this was built in 1937. He also served as assistant rector at the Alexander Nevsky Cathedral, Paris. He died at Reims on 7 January 1937. Fellow Russian general Pyotr Kovalevsky noted in his diary that Taranovsky's 10 January funeral was not attended by many official figures. French general Adolphe Guillaumat attended in plain clothes and Serbian military and diplomatic figures were present. Russian general Yevgeny Miller and a Yugoslav general gave speeches before Taranovsky was buried in a military section of the Sainte-Geneviève-des-Bois Russian Cemetery.

== Bibliography ==
- Lobanov-Rostovsky, Andrei (1935). The Grinding Mill: Reminiscences of War and Revolution in Russia, 1913-1920. Macmillan.
