= Nicolai Ivanovich Andrusov =

Russian geologist (1861–1924)

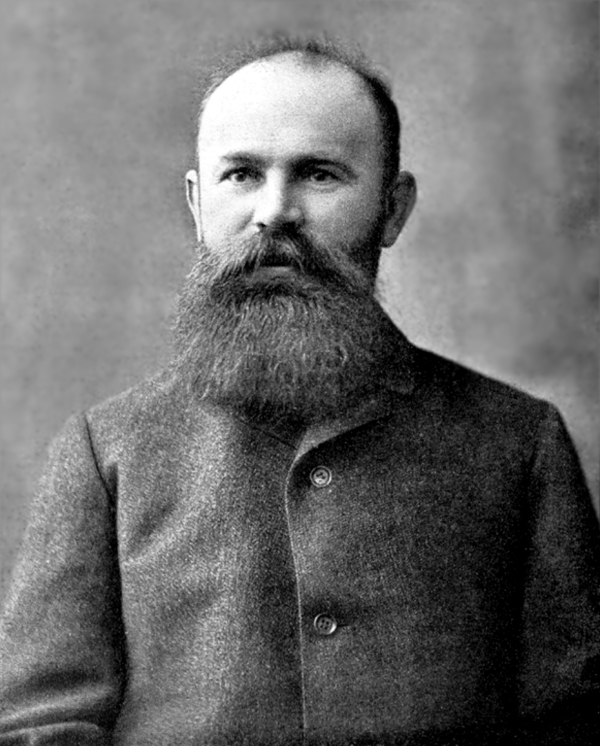
Andrusov in 1923

Nicolai Ivanovich Andrusov (Russian: Николай Иванович Андрусов, romanized: Nikolay Ivanovich Andrusov; Ukrainian: Микола Іванович Андрусов, romanized: Mykola Ivanovych Andrusov; 19 December 1861 – 27 April 1924) was a Russian geologist, stratigrapher and palaeontologist.

== Biography ==
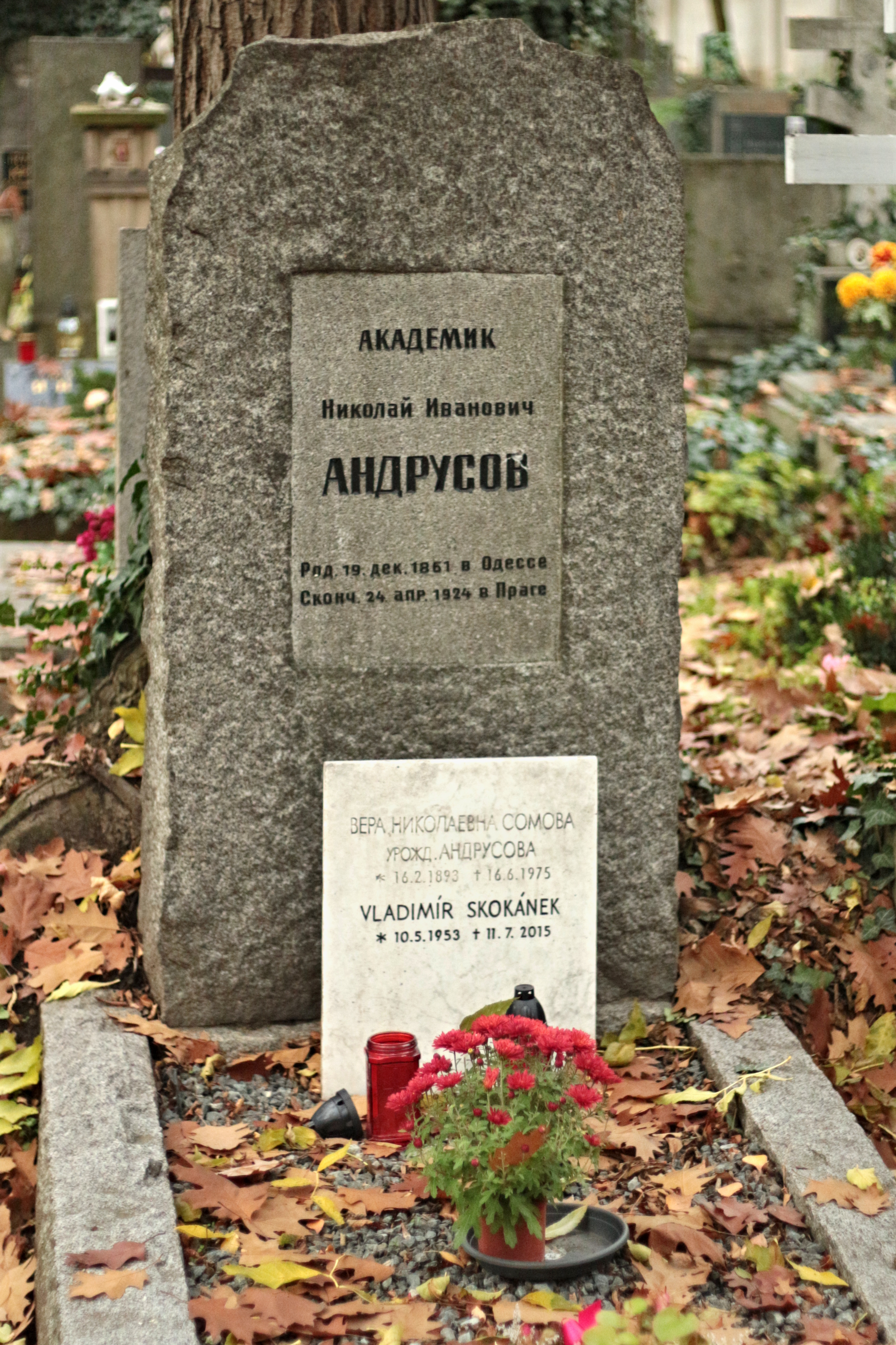
Grave of Andrusov at the Olšany Cemetery

He was born in Odessa, Russian Empire (now Odesa, Ukraine). He studied geology and zoology at the Imperial Novorossiya University in Odessa. He then traveled across the Russian Empire and central Europe to collect fossil specimens.

The Challenger expedition of 1872–1876 studied processes of the sea floor. In 1889, Andrusov published a review of this expedition in Gornyi zhurnal (Mining Journal). He would later perform studies of the geology and sediments of the Ponto-Caspian steppe.

From 1890 to 1891, he participated in a deep water expedition to the Black Sea by the Russian Geographical Society. This expedition discovered hydrogen sulfide in the lower portions of this sea. Andrusov was the first to propose that this substance was created by biological decomposition of life forms (bacteria) containing sulfurous compounds.

He was married to Nadezhda Genrikhovna Schliemann in 1889, the daughter of archaeologist Heinrich Schliemann. In 1905, he became a professor at the University of Kiev. In 1914, he became a member of the Russian Academy of Sciences.

Andrusov was from 1920 full member of the Ukrainian Academy of Sciences. He immigrated to France the same year due to illness. The previous year, he had learned about the death of his elder son, and suffered a stroke which resulted in paralysis of a leg and an arm. His relatives decided to move him to Paris, where he had an inheritance from his father-in-law. In 1922, he moved to Prague due to material difficulties, where he died on 27 April 1924. He is buried at the Olšany Cemetery in Prague.

His son Dimitrij Andrusov became a notable geologist and a member of the Slovak Academy of Sciences.

The wrinkle ridge Dorsa Andrusov on the Moon is named after him, as well as the Mid-Black Sea High – Andrusov Ridge.
