= Mikhail Kedrov (admiral) =

Russian Navy admiral (1878–1945)

Mikhail Alexandrovich Kedrov
- Михаи́л Алекса́ндрович Ке́дров
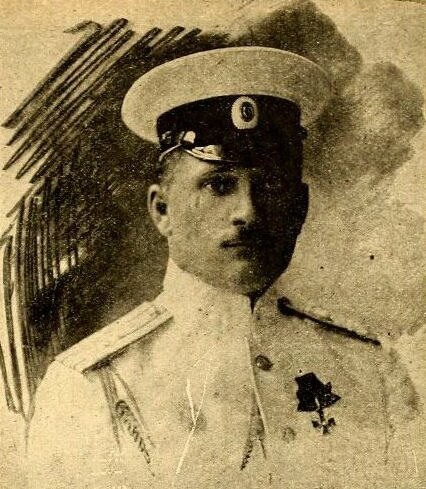
- Born: 13 September 1878
- Died: 29 October 1945 (aged 67); Paris, France
- Military career
- Allegiance: Russian Empire (Russia) White Movement
- Branch: Imperial Russian Navy
- Service years: 1899–1920
- Rank: Vice Admiral
- Commands: Black Sea Fleet; Wrangel's fleet
- Conflicts: Russo-Japanese War; World War I Russian Civil War

Mikhail Aleksandrovich Kedrov (Russian: Михаи́л Алекса́ндрович Ке́дров) (13 September 1878 – 29 October 1945) was a Russian naval officer who served in the Imperial Russian Navy during the Russo-Japanese War, World War I, and the Russian Civil War.

== Early life ==
Kedrov graduated from the Sea Cadet Corps in 1899 at the top of his class and served as a midshipman on the cruiser Gerzog Edinburgski.

== Russo-Japanese War ==
During the Russo-Japanese War, Kedrov served as flag captain to Admiral Stepan Makarov. He was not on the battleship Petropavlovsk when that ship was sunk (with the loss of the admiral and his staff) as he was detached to the destroyer Boyevoy at the time. Subsequently, Admiral Wilgelm Vitgeft appointed Kedrov as his flag captain. Kedrov was wounded aboard the battleship Tsesarevich during the battle of the Yellow Sea. After recovering in hospital in Qingdao, he made his way to Cam Ranh Bay in French Indochina, joining up with the Second Pacific Squadron. He fought at the battle of Tsushima aboard the cruiser Ural, surviving her sinking.

Kedrov completed the Mikhailov Artillery Academy in 1907 and was promoted to Captain Lieutenant and served aboard the training ship Petr Velikiy as a gunnery instructor eventually becoming her commander in 1913 and deputy chief gunnery officer of the Baltic Fleet.

== World War I ==
In 1914 Kedrov was the flag captain of the 2nd Battleship Squadron of the Baltic Fleet. In 1914 he was tasked with bringing the codebooks salvaged from the German cruiser SMS Magdeburg to Britain and was attached to the Royal Navy's Grand Fleet until 1915, serving aboard the cruiser HMS Theseus and the battleships HMS Conqueror and HMS Emperor of India.

In November 1915 Kedrov was appointed to command the battleship Gangut. In February 1916 he was summoned to Russian general headquarters to explain directly to the tsar, Nicholas II, the causes of disturbances in the Russian fleet. Kedrov then was made commander of the destroyer division of the Baltic Fleet, and later was then promoted to Rear admiral in the Black Sea Fleet of the Imperial Russian Navy in the autumn of 1916.

In 1917 he was appointed commander of the battleship squadron of the Black Sea Fleet.

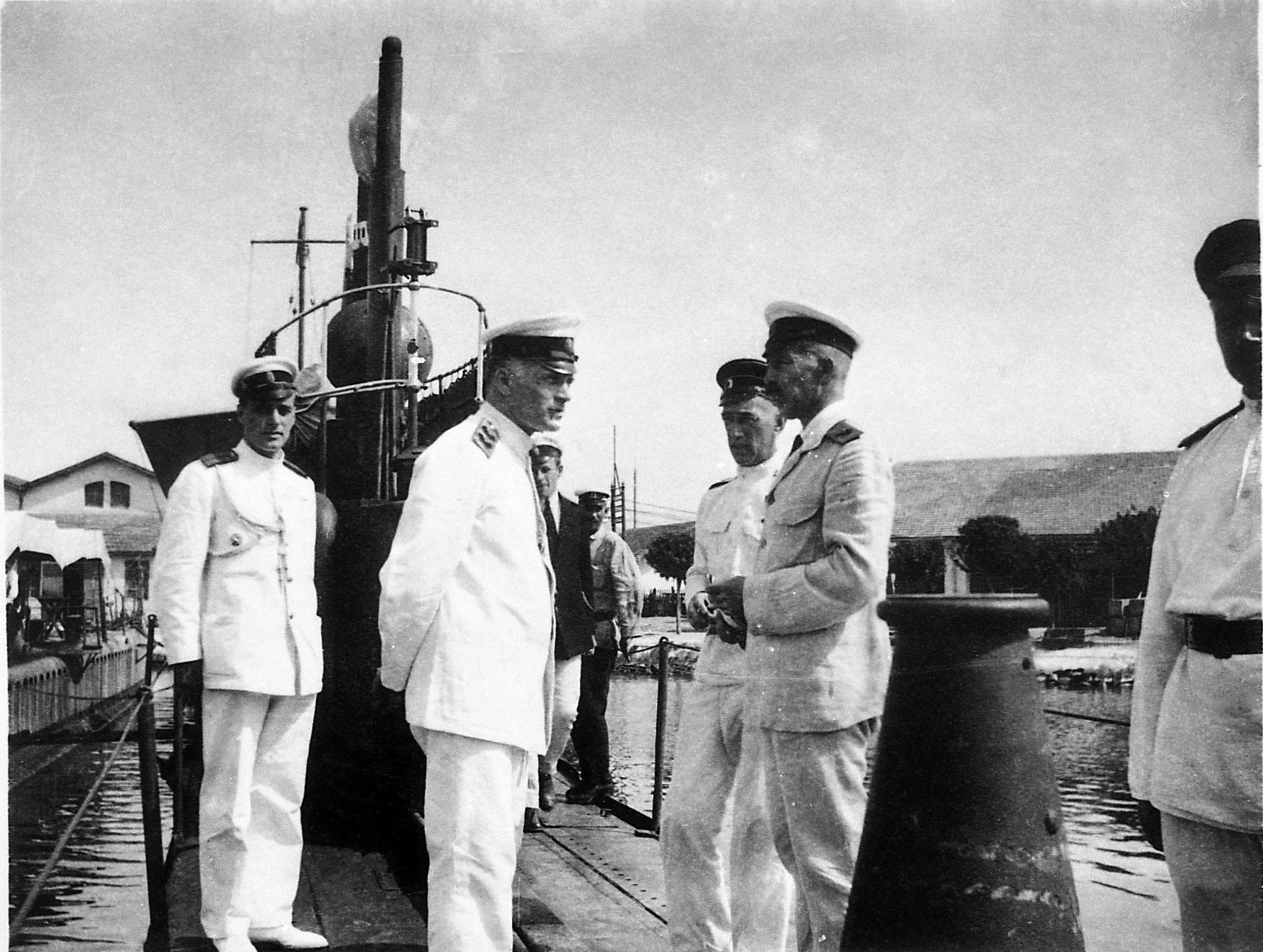
Mikhail Kedrov (middle) aboard the submarine Tyulen in Bizerte, 1920.

After the abdication of the tsar and the beginning of the Russian Civil War, Admiral Kedrov served with the White forces during the Russian Civil War and was a Vice admiral in the White Russian naval forces. He helped Pyotr Nikolayevich Wrangel lead the White naval evacuation known as Wrangel's fleet in its November 1920 flight from the Crimea to Turkey and then Bizerte. The evacuation allowed 145,693 people, plus the ship crews, to escape the approaching Bolsheviks. In November 1920 Kedrov relinquished command of the fleet to Admiral Mikhail Berens.

== Life in Exile ==
Kedrov settled in France and retrained as a civil engineer at the École des Ponts et Chaussées. He worked as an engineer and became chairman of the Federation of Russian Engineers in Paris.

He played a significant role in the Russian military emigration, and was chairman of the Naval Union, which consisted of more than 30 departments and groups in different countries. Since 1930 he was the second deputy chairman of the Company's Russian Military Union (EMRO) under General Yevgeny Miller. After the kidnapping of Miller by Soviet agents in 1937, he served as chairman of EMRO for a short time and then withdrew from political activity. From 1938, he was the Second Vice-President of the Union of Knights of St. George.

He died in Paris and was buried in the cemetery of Sainte-Genevieve-des-Bois.
