= Lila Kedrova =

Russian-French actress (1909–2000)

- Лиля Кедрова
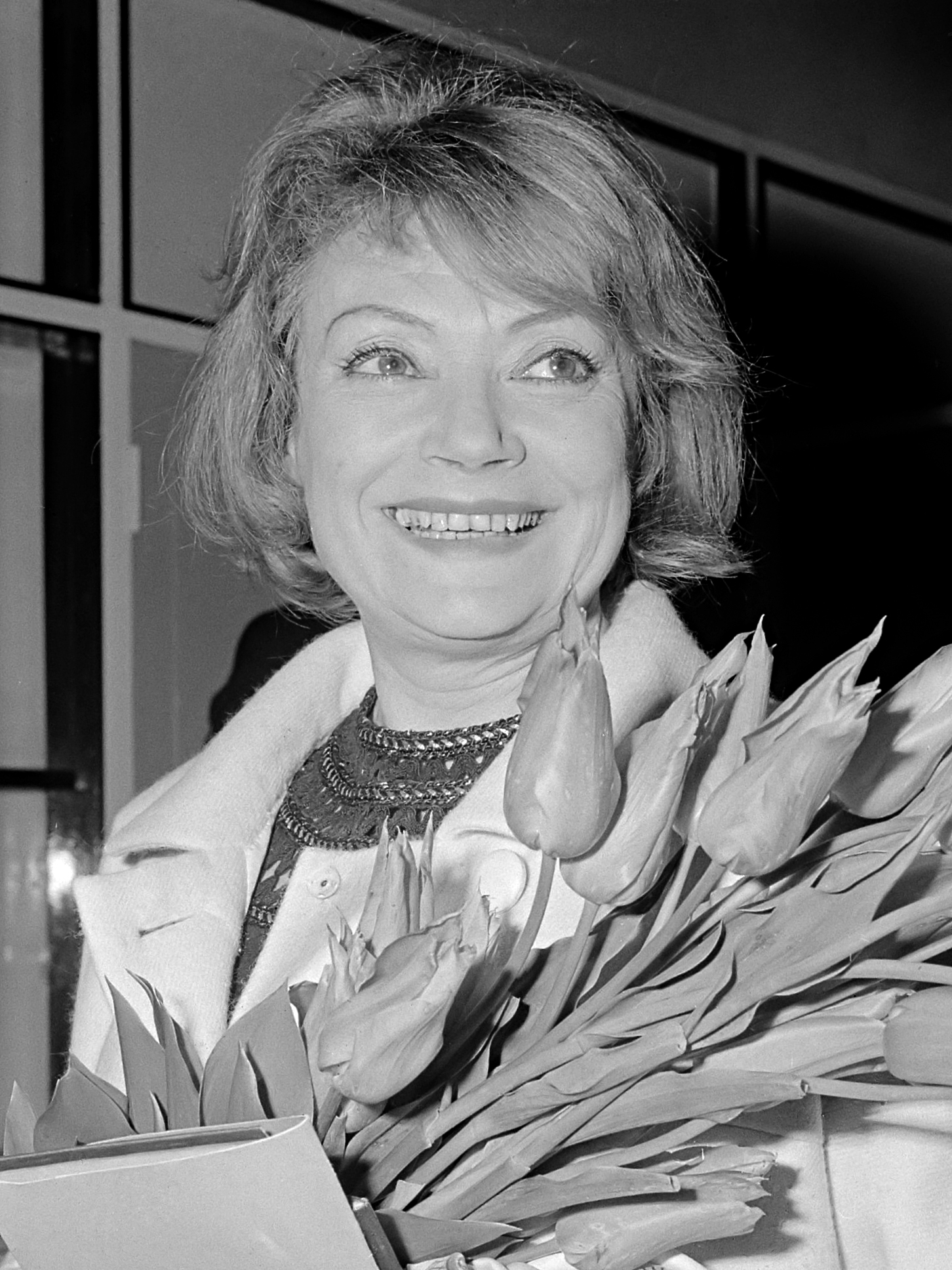
- Kedrova in 1965
- Born: Yelizaveta Nikolayevna Kedrova; 9 October 1909; St. Petersburg, Russia
- Died: 16 February 2000 (aged 90); Sault Ste. Marie, Ontario, Canada
- Occupation: Actress
- Years active: 1938–1994
- Spouse(s): Pierre Valde (m. 1948, divorced) Richard Howard (m. 1968)
- Father: Nikolay Kedrov Sr.
- Relatives: Nikolay Kedrov Jr. (brother)

Yelizaveta Nikolaevna Kedrova (Russian: Елизавета Николаевна Кедрова; 9 October 1909 – 16 February 2000), known as Lila Kedrova (Лиля Кедрова), was a Russian-French actress of the screen and stage. For her portrayal of Madame Hortense in Zorba the Greek (1964), she won an Academy Award for Best Supporting Actress. She reprised the same role in the musical stage adaptation on Broadway in 1984, winning the Tony Award for Best Featured Actress in a Musical and the Drama Desk Award for Outstanding Featured Actress in a Musical.

== Early life ==
Yelizaveta Nikolayevna Kedrova was born in Saint Petersburg, Russia. During her life, her birth date was often reported as 9 October 1918. However, her gravestone gives her birth date 9 October 1909.

Kedrova was the youngest of three children born to opera singer parents. Her father, Nikolay Kedrov Sr. (1871–1940), was a singer and composer, a creator of the first Russian male quartet to perform liturgical chants. Her mother, Sofia Gladkaya (1874–1965), was a singer at the Mariinsky Theatre and a teacher at the Conservatoire de Paris. Her brother, Nikolay Kedrov Jr. (died 1981), was a Russian singer and composer of liturgical music. Her sister, Irene Kedroff (Irina Nikolayevna Kedrova; died 1989), was a soprano.

In 1922, several years after the October Revolution, the family emigrated to Berlin. By 1926 they were living in France, where Kedrova's mother taught at the Conservatoire de Paris, and her father again recreated Quatuor Kedroff.

== Career ==
In 1932, Kedrova joined the Moscow Art Theatre touring company. Throughout the 1950s and '60s was a fixture of the Parisian stage, notably appearing in productions of The Rose Tattoo, The Playboy of the Western World, A View from the Bridge, A Taste of Honey, and Les Parents terribles. During this time, she also married actor-director Pierre Valde.

She made her film debut in 1938's Ultimatum. She appeared in several French films, mainly in supporting parts, until her first English-language film appearance as Madame Hortense in Zorba the Greek (1964). She won the role after the director's first choice, Simone Signoret, quit early in production. Despite being a relative unknown internationally, director Michael Cacoyannis reached out to her personally. Her performance ultimately won her the Oscar for Best Supporting Actress.

Kedrova then appeared in Alfred Hitchcock's film Torn Curtain (1966), playing the role of Countess Kuczynska , a Polish noblewoman in East Berlin who is desperate to emigrate to the United States. Kedrova played Fräulein Schneider in the West End stage production of Cabaret in 1968, and Lyuba Ranevskaya in a UK touring production of The Cherry Orchard. She then played a series of eccentric and crazy women in Hollywood films, as well as in several Italian productions including the horror films Footprints on the Moon and The Cursed Medallion. In 1976, she starred in Roman Polanski's The Tenant.

In 1983, she reprised her role as Madame Hortense on Broadway in the musical stage version of Zorba the Greek, winning both a Tony Award for Best Featured Actress in a Musical and a Drama Desk Award for Outstanding Featured Actress in a Musical in the process. In 1989, she played Madame Armfeldt in the London revival of A Little Night Music.

== Personal life ==
Kedrova's second husband was Canadian stage director Richard Howard (1932–2017). She retired from acting in the mid-1990s due to Alzheimer's disease.

=== Death ===
In 2000, Kedrova died at her summer home in Sault Ste. Marie, Ontario, of pneumonia. Her remains were cremated, and her ashes are buried in her family grave in the Sainte-Geneviève-des-Bois Russian Cemetery in Paris.

== Filmography ==
=== Film ===
Year	Title	Role	Notes
1938	Ultimatum	Irina	as Lila Kédrova
1953	No Way Back	Ljuba	as Lila Kedrowa
1954	Le Défroqué		Uncredited
1954	Flesh and the Woman	Rose	
1955	Les Impures	Mme. Denis	
1955	Les Chiffonniers d'Emmaus	Bastien's Wife	Uncredited
1955	Razzia sur la chnouf	Léa	
1955	Futures vedettes	Mme. Dimater	
1956	Des gens sans importance	Mme. Vacopoulos	
1956	Calle Mayor	Pepita	
1957	Until the Last One	Marcella Bastia	
1957	Ce joli monde	Léa	
1958	The Lovers of Montparnasse	Mme. Sborowsky	
1959	La Femme et le Pantin	Manuela	
1959	Jons und Erdme		
1959	Mon pote le gitan	La Choute	
1963	Kriss Romani	Kirvi	
1964	La Mort d'un tueur	Massa's Mother	
1964	Zorba the Greek	Madame Hortense	
1965	A High Wind in Jamaica	Rosa	
1966	Torn Curtain	Countess Kuchinska	
1966	Penelope	Sadaba	
1967	Maigret a Pigalle	Rose Alfonsi	
1967	Le Canard en fer-blanc	Rosa	
1968	The Girl Who Couldn't Say No	Yolanda's Mother	
1970	The Kremlin Letter	Madam Sophie	
1972	A Time for Loving	Madame Olga Dubillard	
1972	Rak	David's Mother	
1972	Escape to the Sun	Sarah Kaplan	
1974	Soft Beds, Hard Battles	Madame Grenier	
1974	Alla mia cara mamma nel giorno del suo compleanno	Countess Mafalda	
1975	Footprints on the Moon	Mrs. Heim	
1975	The Cursed Medallion	Contessa Cappelli	
1975	Eliza's Horoscope	Lila	
1976	The Tenant	Madame Gaderian	
1977	Moi, fleur bleue	Countess de Tocqueville	
1977	Nido de Viudas	Mother	
1978	Le Paradis des riches	Camille Chevallier	
1979	Le Cavaleur	Olga	
1979	Les Égouts du paradis	Charlotte	
1979	Womanlight	Sonia Tovalski	
1980	Les Parents terribles	Yvonne	
1980	Tell Me a Riddle	Eva	
1981	Il Turno	Maria	
1982	Blood Tide	Sister Anna	
1984	Sword of the Valiant	Lady of Lyonesse	
1988	Some Girls	Granny	
1991	A Star for Two	Simone	
1993	Next Time the Fire	Mother	

=== Television ===
Year	Title	Role(s)	Notes
1964	Les Cinq Dernières Minutes	Mme. Grisolles, Wanda Nouchkine	2 episodes
1961	L'histoire dépasse la fiction	Leonora Dori	Episode: "Les Concini"
1962	Mesdemoiselles Armande	La Ledoux	TV movie
1966	Le train bleu s'arrête 13 fois	Sonia	Episode: "Monte-Carlo: Un mari dangerux"
1966	Thirteen Against Fate	Emma Martens	Episode: "The Survivors"
1969	A Touch of Venus	Francesca	Episode: "Soap & Water"
1972	Cool Million	Mme. Martine	Episode: "Mask of Marcella"
1973	Les glaces	Madame	TV movie
1976	Second City Firsts	Natasha	Episode: "Trotsky is Dead"
1977	Cinéma 16	Mme. Debolska	Episode: "Au bont du printemps"
1979	Le petit théâtre d'Antenne 2		Episode: "Le bifteck"
1980	Les amours de la belle époque	Mme. Grabut	Episode: "Mon amie Nane"
1980	The Ghost Sonata	The Mummy	TV movie
1988	Two Men	Rose	TV movie

== Awards and nominations ==
Award	Year	Category	Nominated work	Results	Ref.
Academy Awards	1964	Best Supporting Actress	Zorba the Greek	Won	
British Academy Film Awards	1965	Best Foreign Actress	Zorba the Greek	Nominated	
Canadian Film Awards	1975	Best Supporting Actress	Eliza's Horoscope	Won	
Drama Desk Awards	1984	Outstanding Featured Actress in a Musical	Zorba	Won (Note: Tied with Catherine Cox for Baby.)	
Golden Globe Awards	1964	Best Supporting Actress – Motion Picture	Zorba the Greek	Nominated	
Laurel Awards	1964	Supporting Performance – Female	Zorba the Greek	4th Place	
Laurel Awards	1964	New Faces – Female		6th Place	
Taormina International Film Festival	1981	Best Actress	Tell Me a Riddle	Won	
Tony Awards	1984	Best Featured Actress in a Musical	Zorba	Won	

== See also ==
- List of Academy Award winners and nominees from Russia
- List of Academy Award winners and nominees from France
- List of actors with Academy Award nominations
