= Nikolay Kedrov Sr. =

Russian composer

- Николай Николаевич Кедров
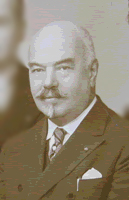
- Born: October 28, 1871; St. Petersburg, Russia
- Died: February 2, 1940 (aged 68); Paris, France
- Spouse: Sofia Gladkaya
- Children: 3: Irina Kedrova; Lila Kedrova; Nikolay Kedrov Jr.

Nikolay Nikolayevich Kedrov Sr. (Russian: Николай Николаевич Кедров; 28 October 1871 – 2 February 1940) was a Russian composer of liturgical music. His setting of Otche Nash (The Lord's Prayer) is one of the best-known in the repertoire.

== Family ==
Kedrov was born in Saint Petersburg, in the Russian Empire, into the family of a Russian Orthodox archpriest. His wife was Sofia Gladkaya (Kedrova; ru: Софья Николаевна Гладкая; 1874–1965), a singer at the Mariinsky Theatre. His elder daughter was soprano Irina Kedrova and his younger daughter was Oscar and Tony Award-winning actress Lila Kedrova. His son was Nikolay Kedrov Jr.

== Career ==
From 1894 to 1897, he studied singing at the St. Petersburg Conservatory, becoming an operatic baritone who performed at various theaters, including the Bolshoi and the Mariinsky Theatre. In 1897, he organized a men's vocal quartet (Saint Petersburg Russian vocal quartet). Their first concert was held in 1898 at the St. Petersburg Conservatory. The repertoire of the quartet included Russian folk songs, ballads, opera music, then gradually liturgical music appeared. The quartet each year successfully toured Europe, including participation in Diaghilev's seasons. In 1913-14, Feodor Chaliapin and the quartet recorded a musical album in London. In 1917, Kedrov became a professor of the St. Petersburg Conservatory.

Some time after the October Revolution, in 1922, the family emigrated from Russia and lived in Berlin, in 1928 moved to France. In Paris, Kedrov recreated the quartet (Quatuor Kedroff). The repertoire of the ensemble in exile included liturgical chants of the Russian Orthodox Church. The quartet toured in Europe and North America. Kedrov taught at the Conservatoire Rachmaninoff in Paris. His most famous piece is Our Father (ru: Отче наш), written in 1922.

== Death ==
Nikolay Kedrov died on 2 February 1940 in Paris, aged 68. He was interred in the cemetery of Sainte-Geneviève-des-Bois Russian Cemetery. After his death, the ensemble was headed by his son, Nikolay Kedrov Jr.
