= Lev Conus =

Russian composer (1871–1944)

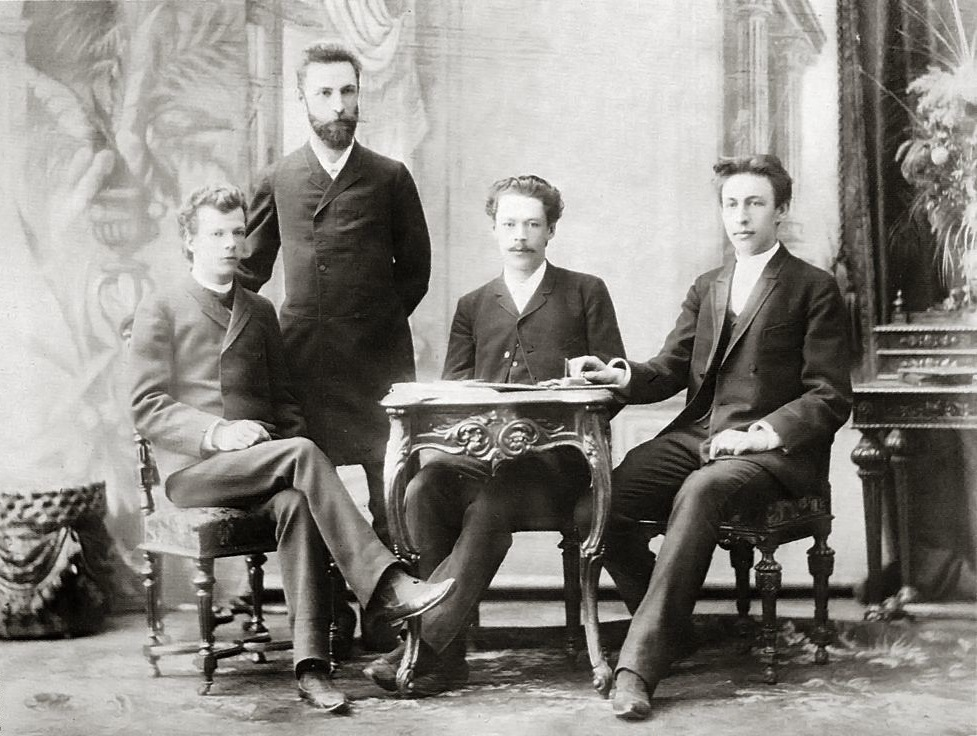
Konus (far left) with Anton Arensky and two other classmates from the Moscow Conservatory: Nikita Morozov and Sergei Rachmaninoff

Lev Eduardovich Conus (Russian: Лев Эдуа́рдович Коню́с, romanized: Lev Eduardovich Konyus), also known as Leon Conus (1871–1944), was a Russian pianist, music educator, and composer. A brother of the composers Georgi Conus and Julius Conus, he studied together with Sergei Rachmaninoff in Anton Arensky's advanced composition class and served as chief professor of piano at the Moscow Conservatory until 1918. Together with his wife, the pianist and pedagogue Olga Kovalevskaya Conus (1890–1976) they left the Soviet Union for Paris in 1921 where he subsequently taught at the city's Russian Conservatory, before finally moving to the United States in 1935. He taught in Cincinnati until his death at the age of 73. After his death, his wife published Fundamentals of Piano Technique, an influential book of Leon Conus's technical exercises for pianists.

== Additional reading ==
- Tchaikovsky-Research.net
