= Sainte-Geneviève-des-Bois Russian Cemetery =

Cemetery in Paris, France

Coordinates: 48°37′53″N 2°20′43″E

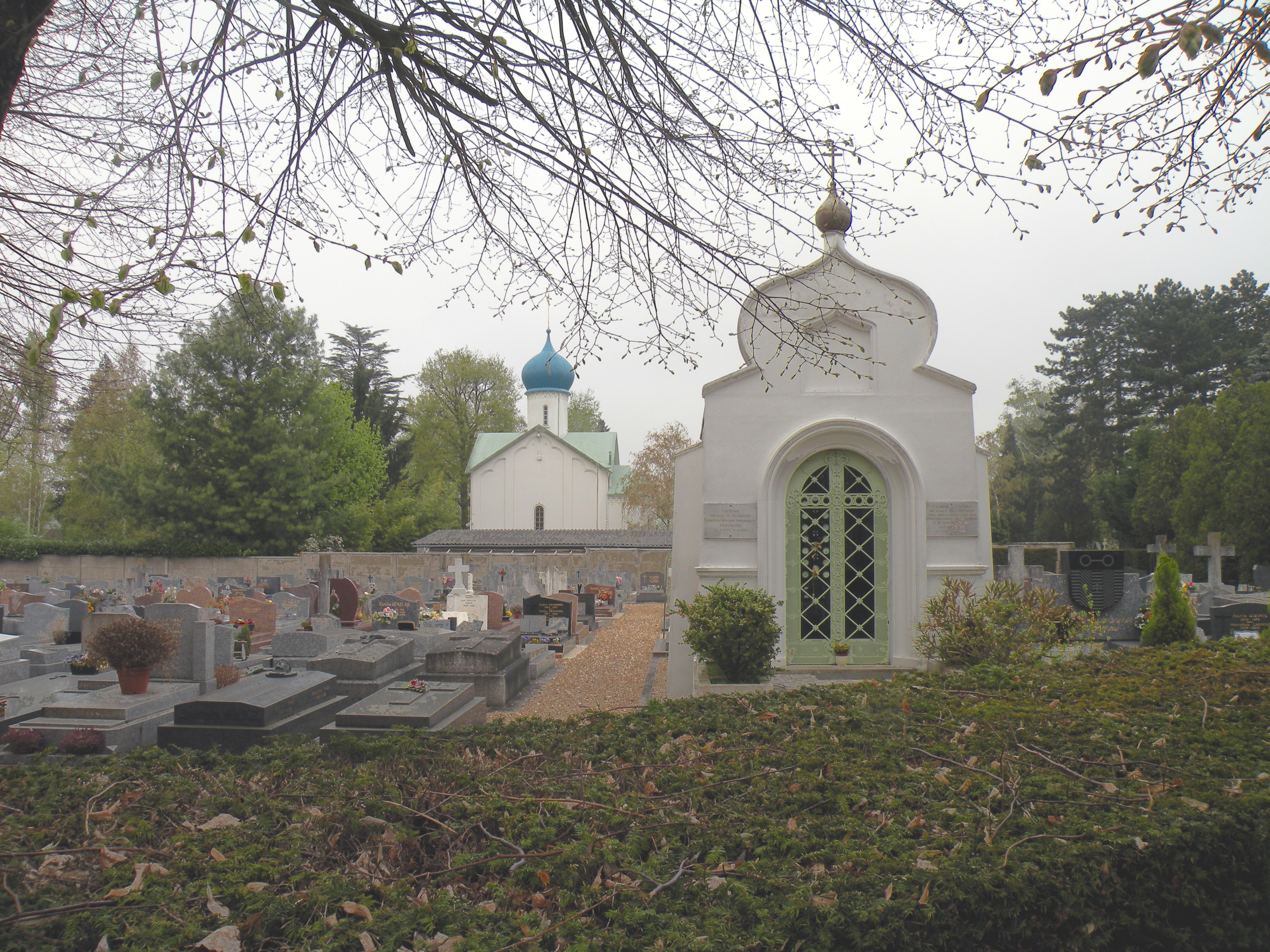
Russian temples

Sainte-Geneviève-des-Bois Russian Cemetery (French: Cimetière russe de Sainte-Geneviève-des-Bois) is part of the Cimetière de Liers and is called the Russian Orthodox cemetery, in Sainte-Geneviève-des-Bois, close to Paris, France.

== History ==
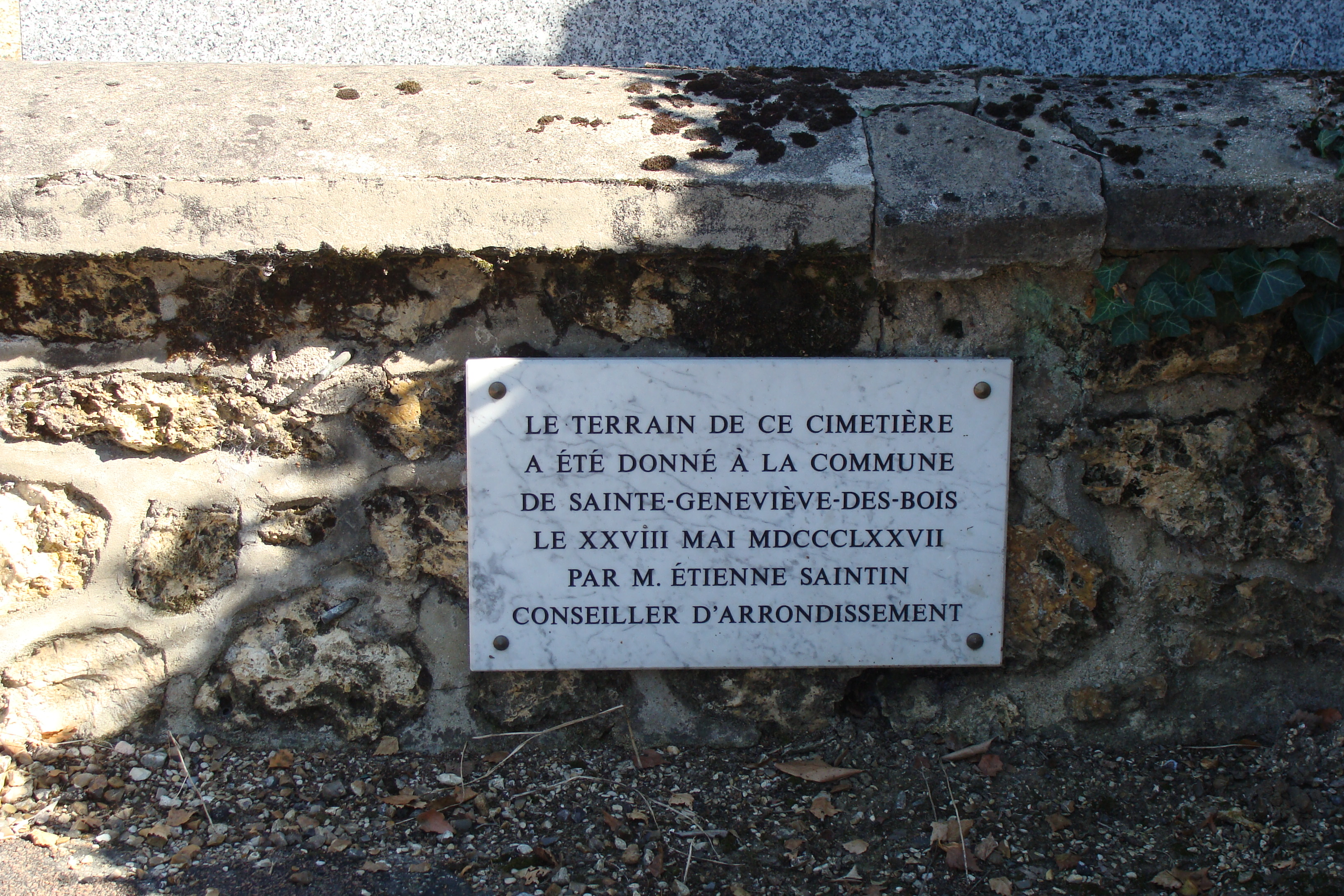
Plaque with information about who and when donated the ground of the cemetery

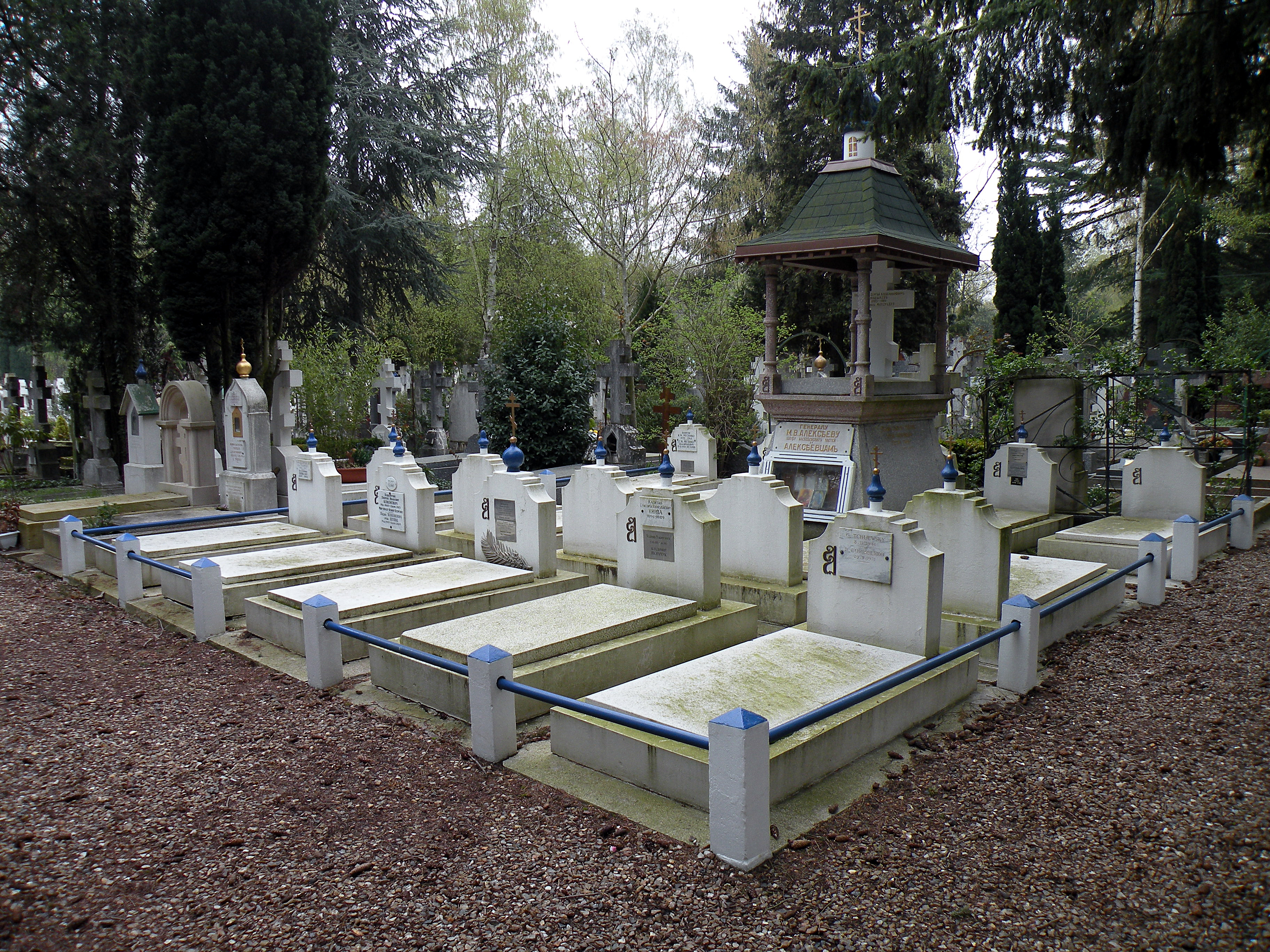
The cemetery

The Cimetière de Liers was created as the second communal cemetery on February 8, 1879 in the city of Sainte Geneviève des Bois in France, 25 km south from Paris. To house the burials of the White Russians who arrived in Paris after the Bolshevik revolution in Russia, some of the land was granted in 1927 to an English benefactress, Dorothy Paget who had set up with Elena Orlov and her sister Princess Vera Meshchersky a still active retirement home for Russian émigrés nearby in the Château de la Cossonnerie. This part of the cemetery is since known as the Russian Cemetery.

In 1938–39 Albert Benois designed the Dormition Church (Église de la Dormition-de-la-Mère-de-Dieu) which serves the cemetery. The church is regarded as an important historic monument and is built in the style of Novgorod Churches of the 15th and 16th century.

== Future ==
Since the 1960s, the municipal authorities have periodically attempted to close the cemetery, claiming that the grounds are needed for public services. Part of the area surrounding the cemetery has recently been developed as housing estates.

There have been reports that some of the graves will be opened and the exhumed remains cremated. The cemetery is not officially considered a landmark and has no legal protection, although the French Ministry of Culture and Communication recognises the cemetery as an important historical monument (the most important necropolis of Russian emigrants in the world) and it has an entry in the Base Mérimée.

As its future remains precarious, several notable Russians – including Ivan Ilyin and Ivan Shmelev – were exhumed and reburied in Moscow. The cemetery is closed to new burials. It was only after pressure from the central government that the burial of Rudolf Nureyev was sanctioned there. His tomb is covered with a mosaic decoration to represent a traditional kilim blanket.

In November 2000 Russian president Vladimir Putin visited the cemetery to pay homage to those buried there.

== Description ==
Many trees have been planted to create an authentic Russian feel to the cemetery. It is estimated that there are more than 5,000 graves. There is one mausoleum.

== Notable burials ==
It is estimated that between 10,000 and 15,000 Russian emigrants or French people of Russian origin have been buried here. Among those are

- Nobel Prize winner author Ivan Bunin (with his wife)
- authors including Andrei Amalrik, Gaito Gazdanov, Zinaida Gippius, Dmitry Merezhkovsky, Viktor Nekrasov, Aleksey Remizov, Ivan Shmelyov, Nadezhda Teffi and Boris Zaytsev;
- ballerina Olga Preobrajenska;
- biochemist Marianne Grunberg-Manago with her parents and husband
- chemist Aleksei Chichibabin;
- composers Nikolay Kedrov Sr. and Nikolai Tcherepnin;
- dancers Serge Lifar and Rudolf Nureyev;
- journalist Anton Kartashev;
- painters Konstantin Korovin, André Lanskoy, Serge Poliakoff, Sergey Solomko, Konstantin Somov, Mstislav Dobuzhinsky and Zinaida Serebriakova;
- philosopher Nikolai Lossky;
- poets Georgy Ivanov and Alexander Galich;
- politicians Vladimir Kokovtsov, Georgy Lvov and Petr Struve;
- sculptor Antoine Pevsner;
- filmmaker Andrei Tarkovsky;
- actresses Natalya Lisenko and Odile Versois;
- film actors Pierre Batcheff and Ivan Mozzhukhin;
- photographer Sergey Prokudin-Gorsky;
- theologians Vladimir Lossky and Sergius Bulgakov;
- generals Afrikan P. Bogaewsky, Abram Dragomirov, Alexander Kaulbars, Nikolai Stogov, Sergei Ulagay, Nikolai Pavlovich Sablin, Nikolai Baratov, Vladimir A. Lekhovich, Nicholas Lokhvitsky, Viktor Taranovsky, Alexandre Woyeikoff and Zinovy Peshkov;
- admirals Nikolai Kolomeitsev, vice-admiral Mikhail Alexandrovich Kedrov, rear-admiral Dmitry Verderevsky;
- aristocrats Grand Duke Andrei Vladimirovich of Russia and his wife Mathilde Kschessinska, Prince Gabriel Constantinovich of Russia, Prince Felix Yusupov and his wife Princess Irina of Russia, Princess Vera Meshchersky;
- geologist Vera Malycheff.

Selected others: Alexander Makinsky, Tatiana Botkina, Patrick Topaloff and Eugene Znosko-Borovsky.

There are memorials for Alexander Kutepov and for Russians who died in the War effort (among whom Princess Véra "Vicky" Obolensky (1911–1944), member of the OCM, daughter of Apollon Apollonovich Makarov and wife of Prince Nicolas Alexandrovich Obolensky).

There are military divisions (on the map indicated with CM, which is an abbreviation of carrés militaires) such as for

- the Alekseyev Division (a division of the White Army founded by Mikhail Alekseyev),
- the Drozdovsky Division (another division of the White Army founded by Mikhail Drozdovsky),
- the Don Cossacks,
- the Cadet Corps.

== Gallery ==
=== Cemetery ===
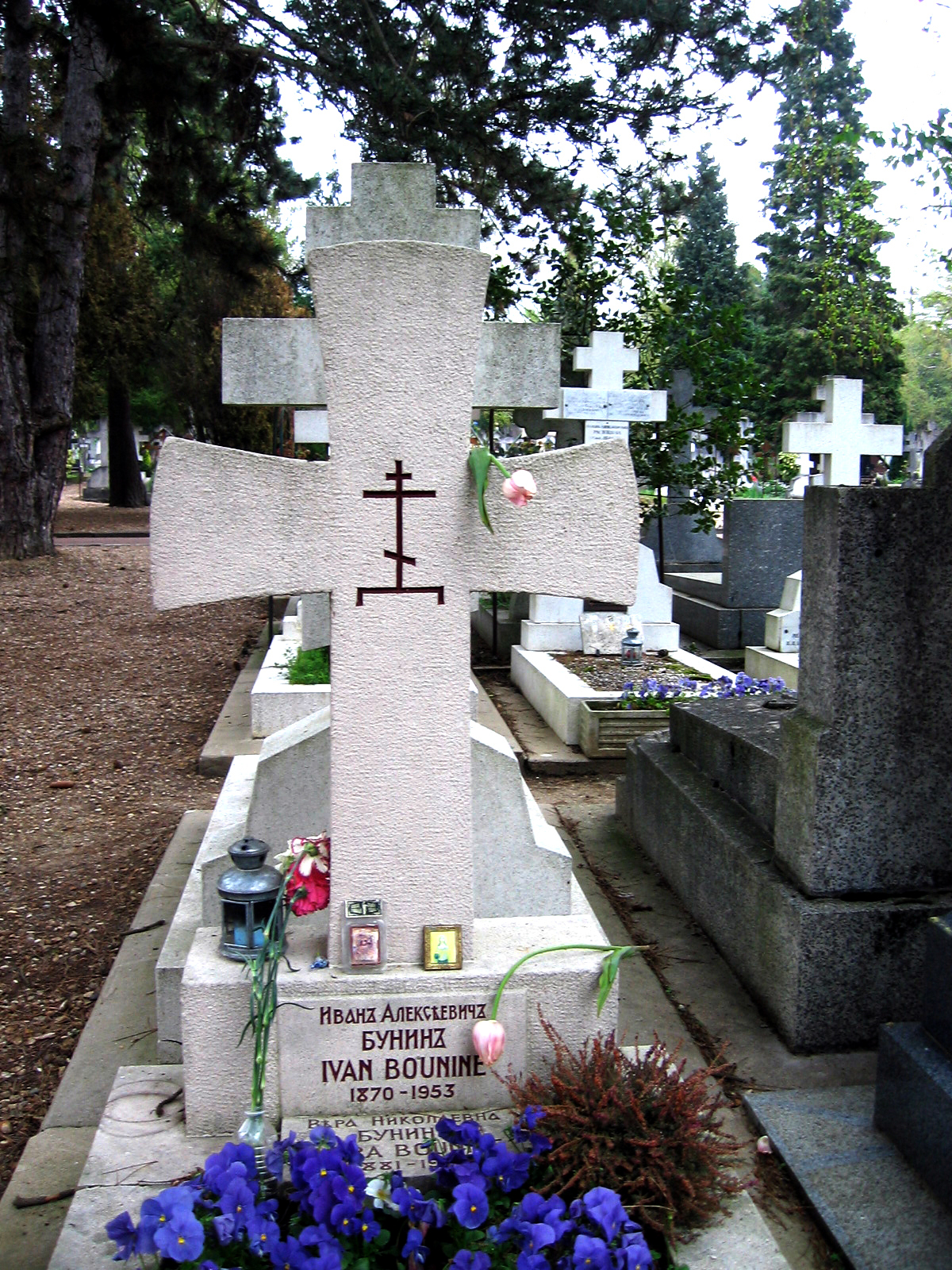
Ivan Bunin's grave

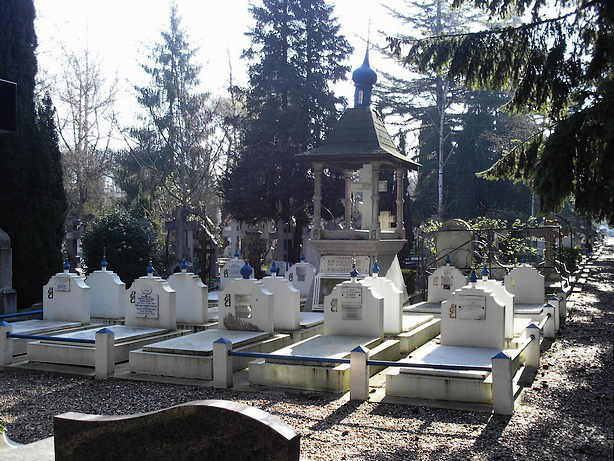
The graves of white émigrés.

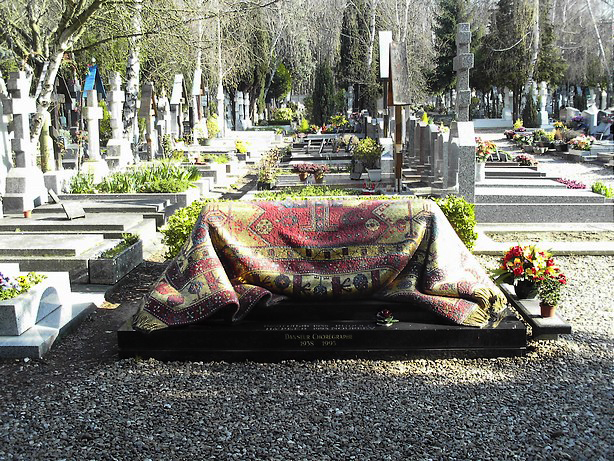
Rudolf Nureyev's grave

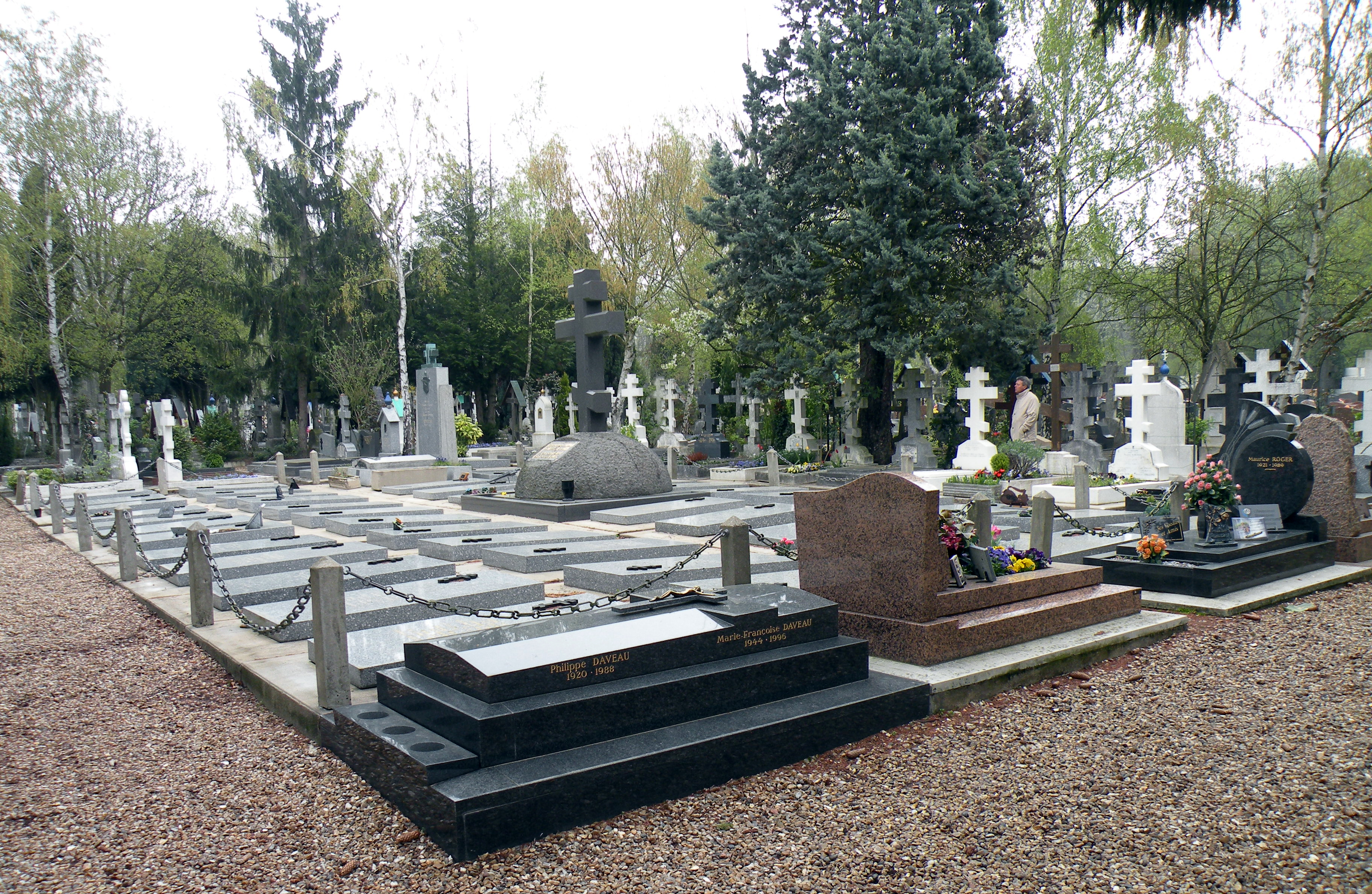
The division for the Don Cossacks

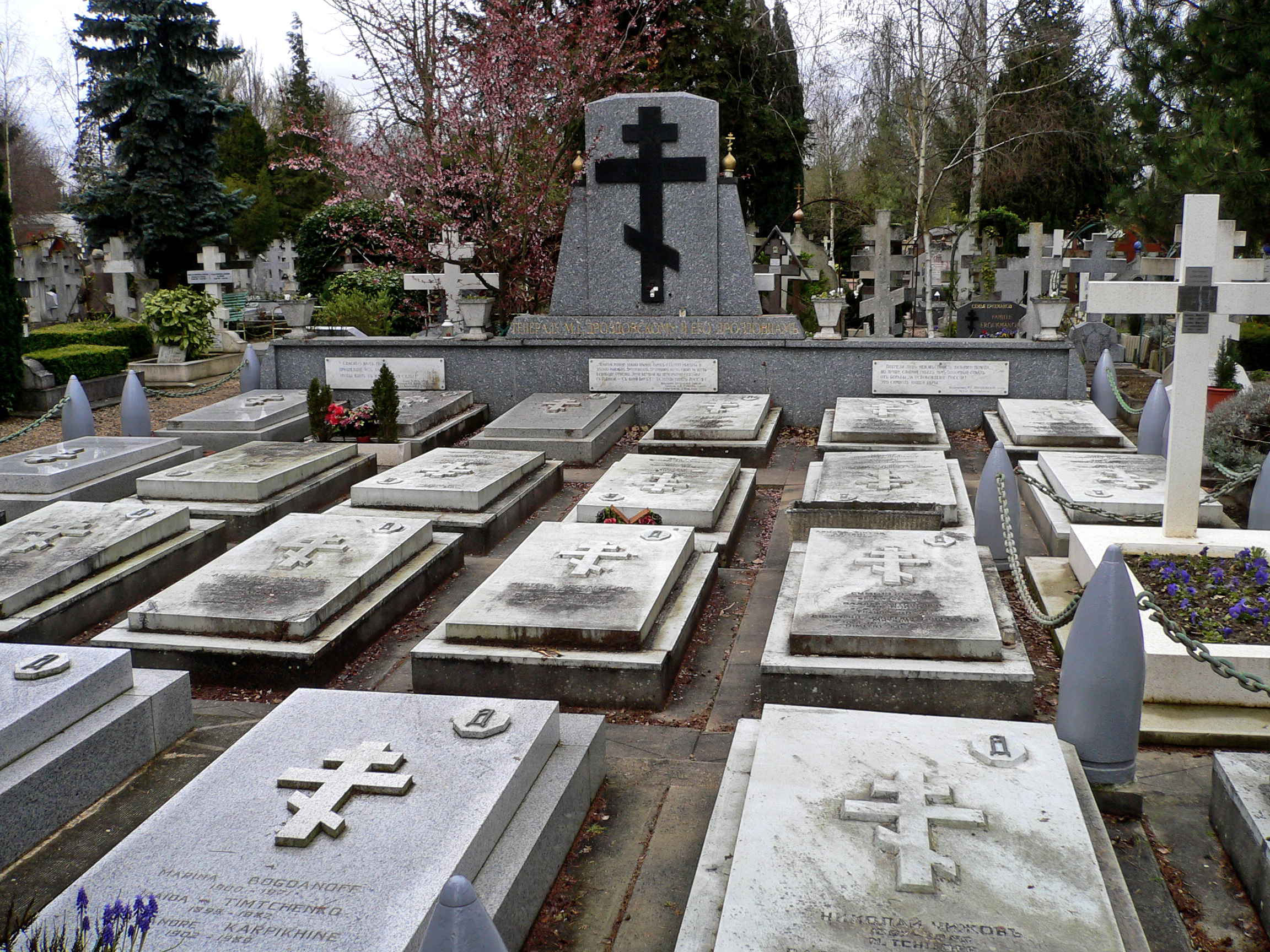
The Drozdovsky Division

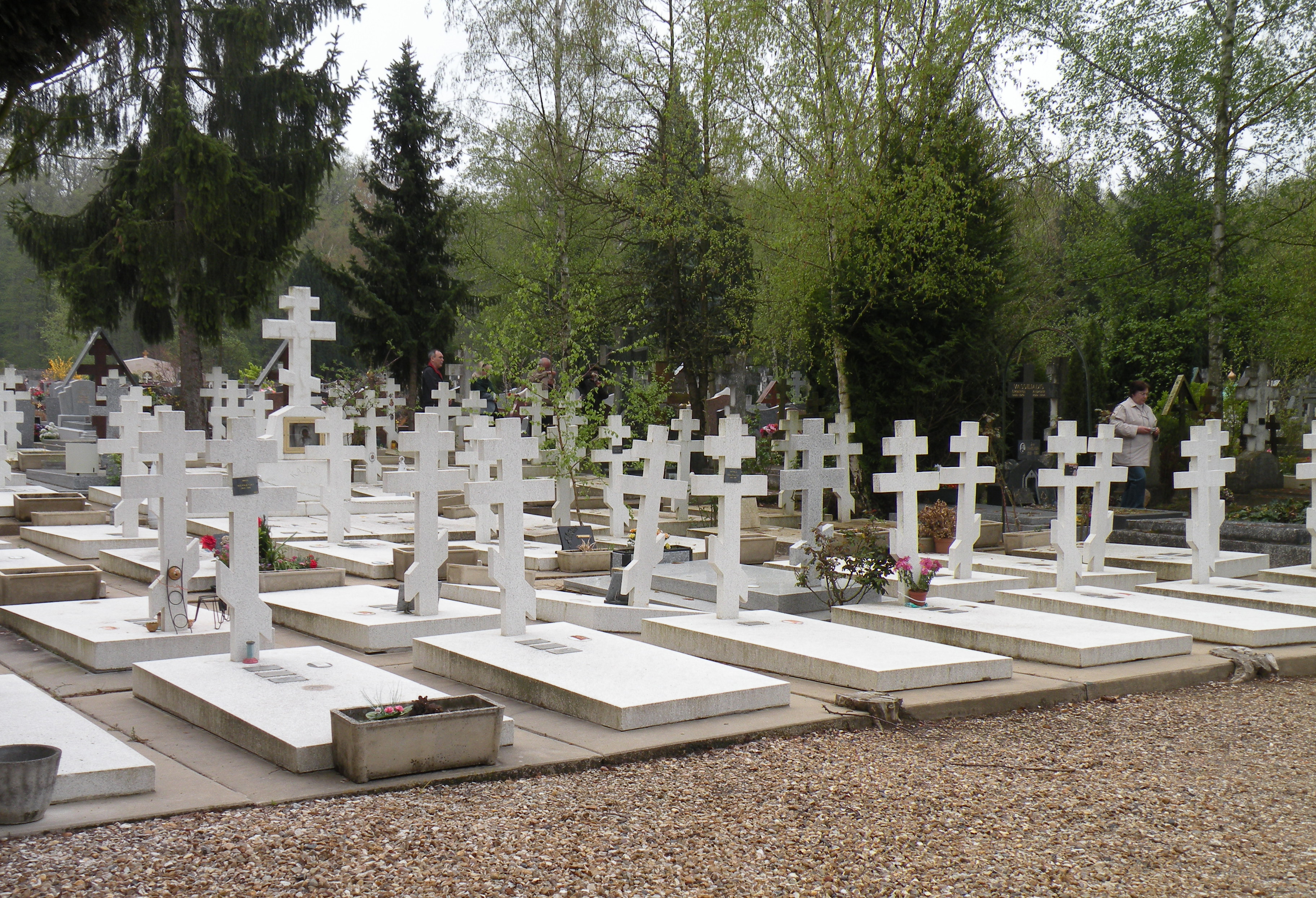
The Cadet Corps section

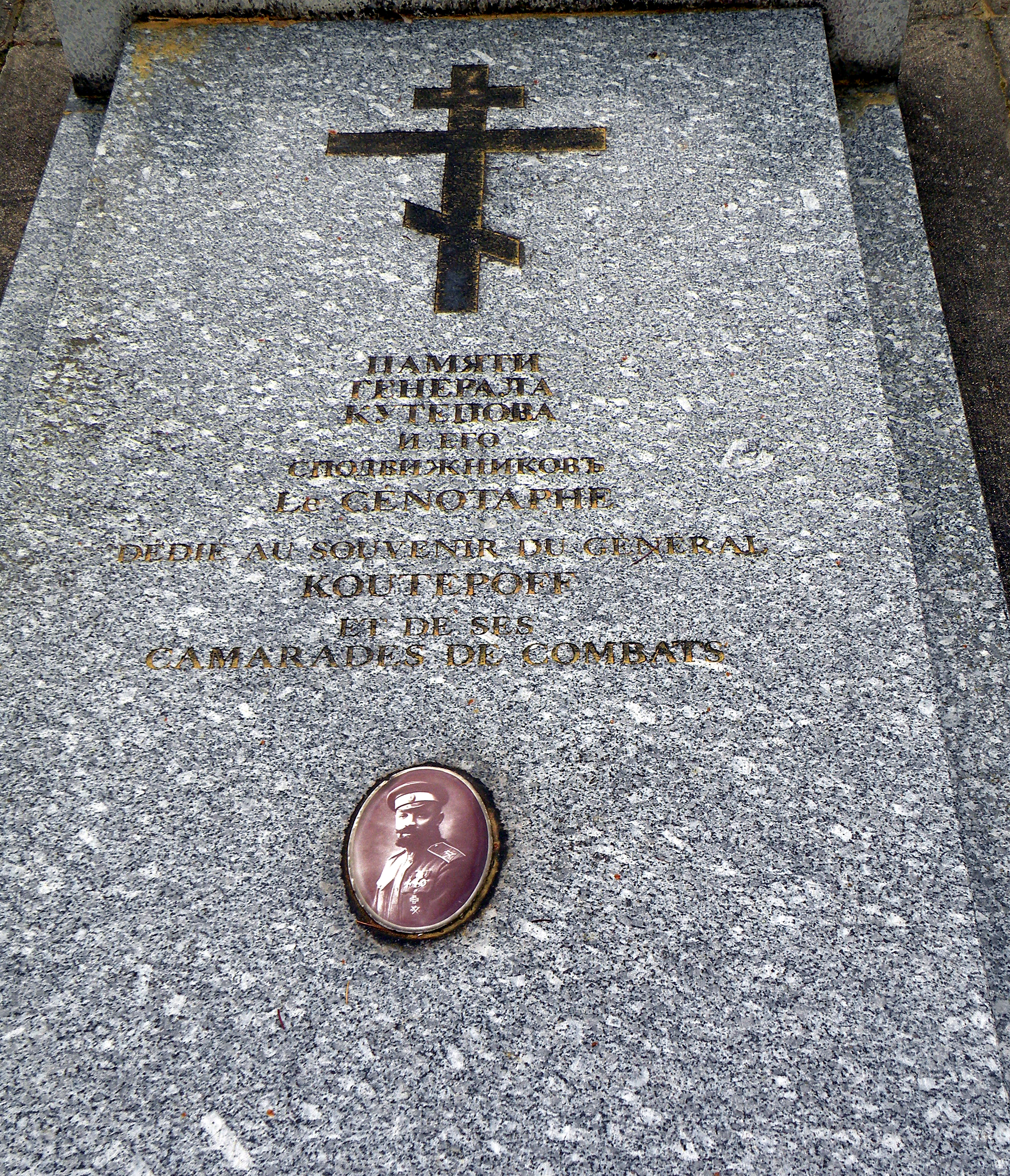
Cenotaph memorial for Alexander Kutepov

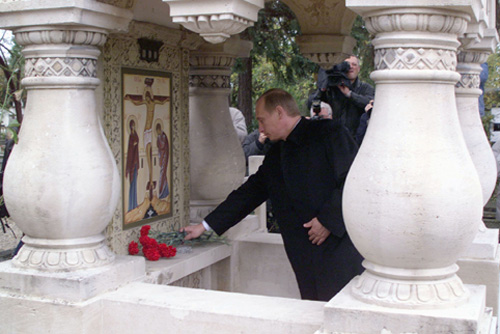
Vladimir Putin in the Memorial for fallen Russians

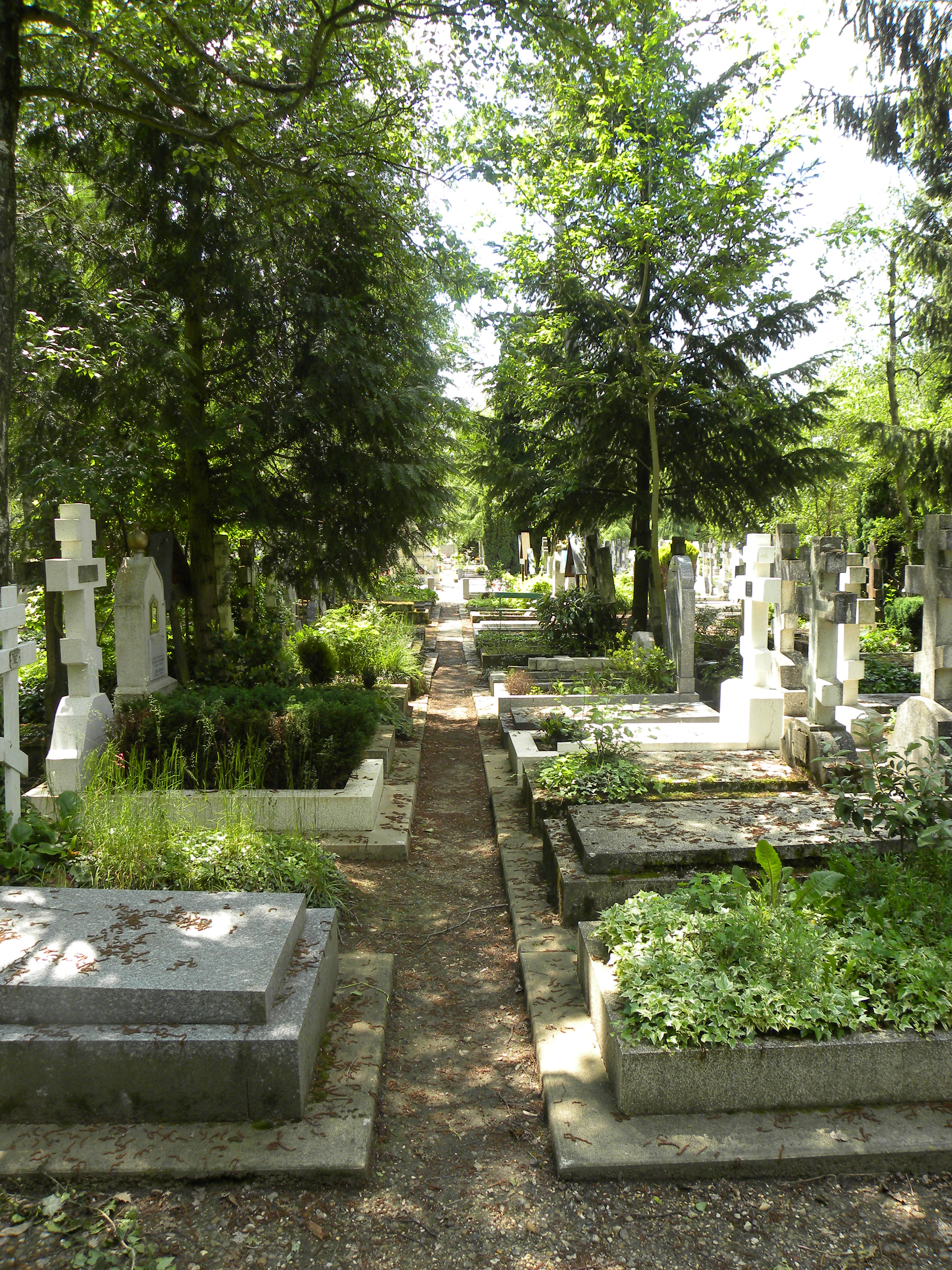
View of the cemetery

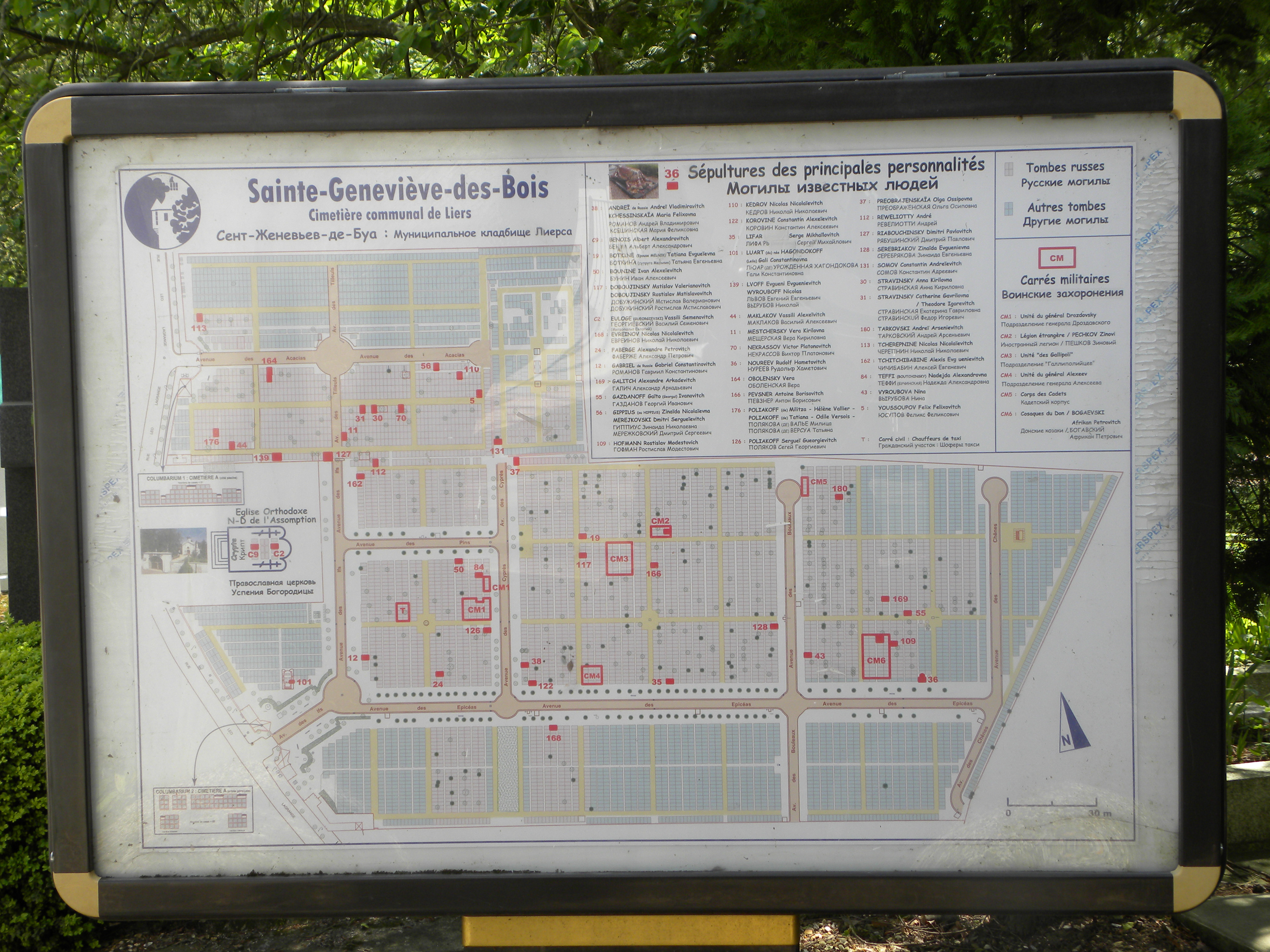
Plan of the cemetery

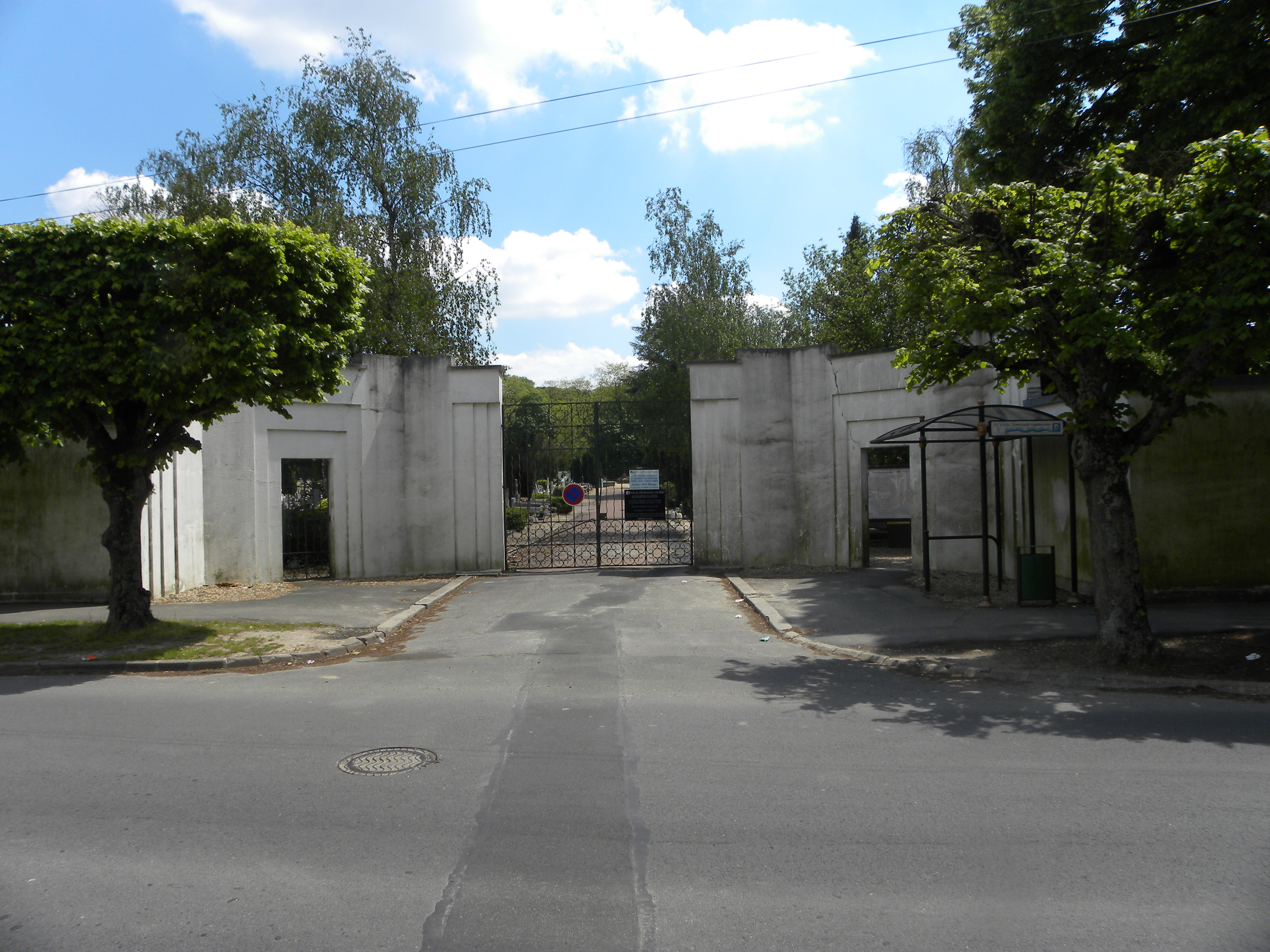
Cemetery gate

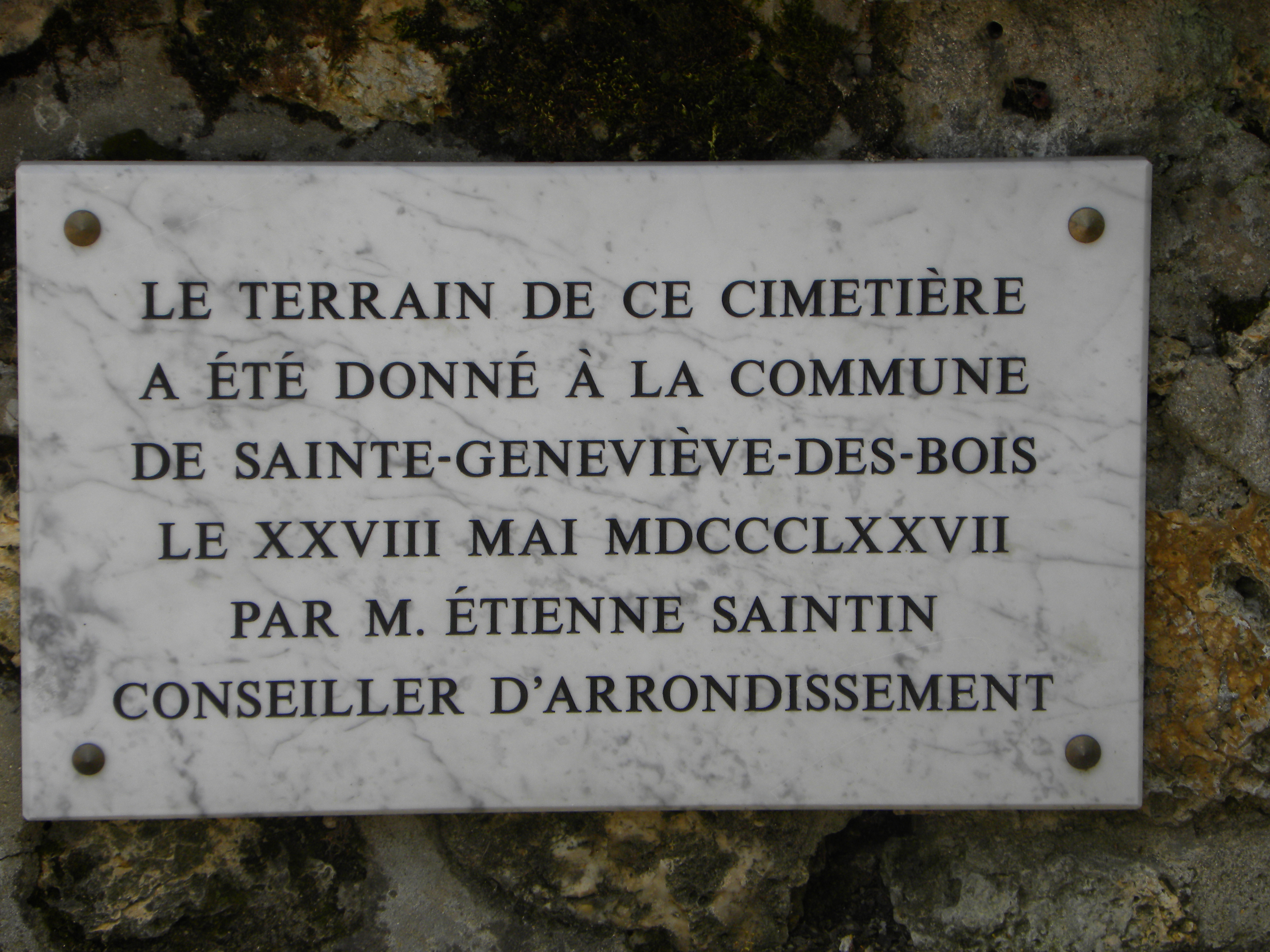
Sign for Cimetière de Liers

=== Église de la Dormition-de-la-Mère-de-Dieu ===
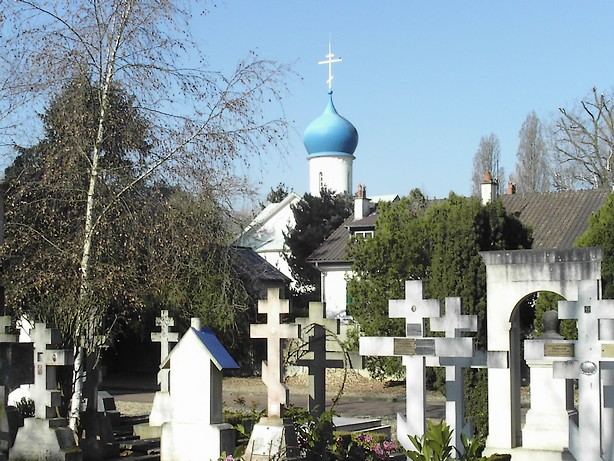
View of the cemetery and church

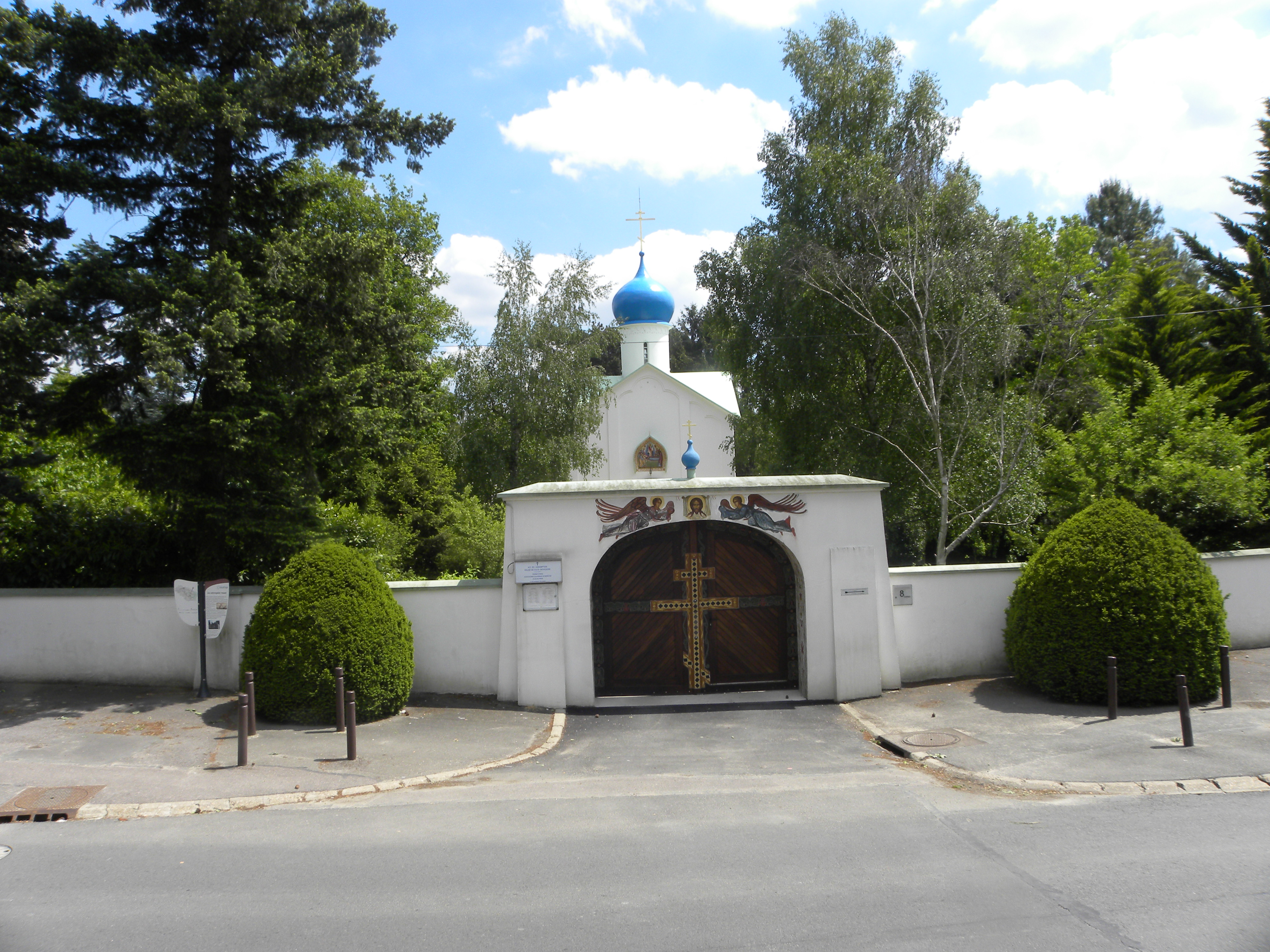
The Church and gate

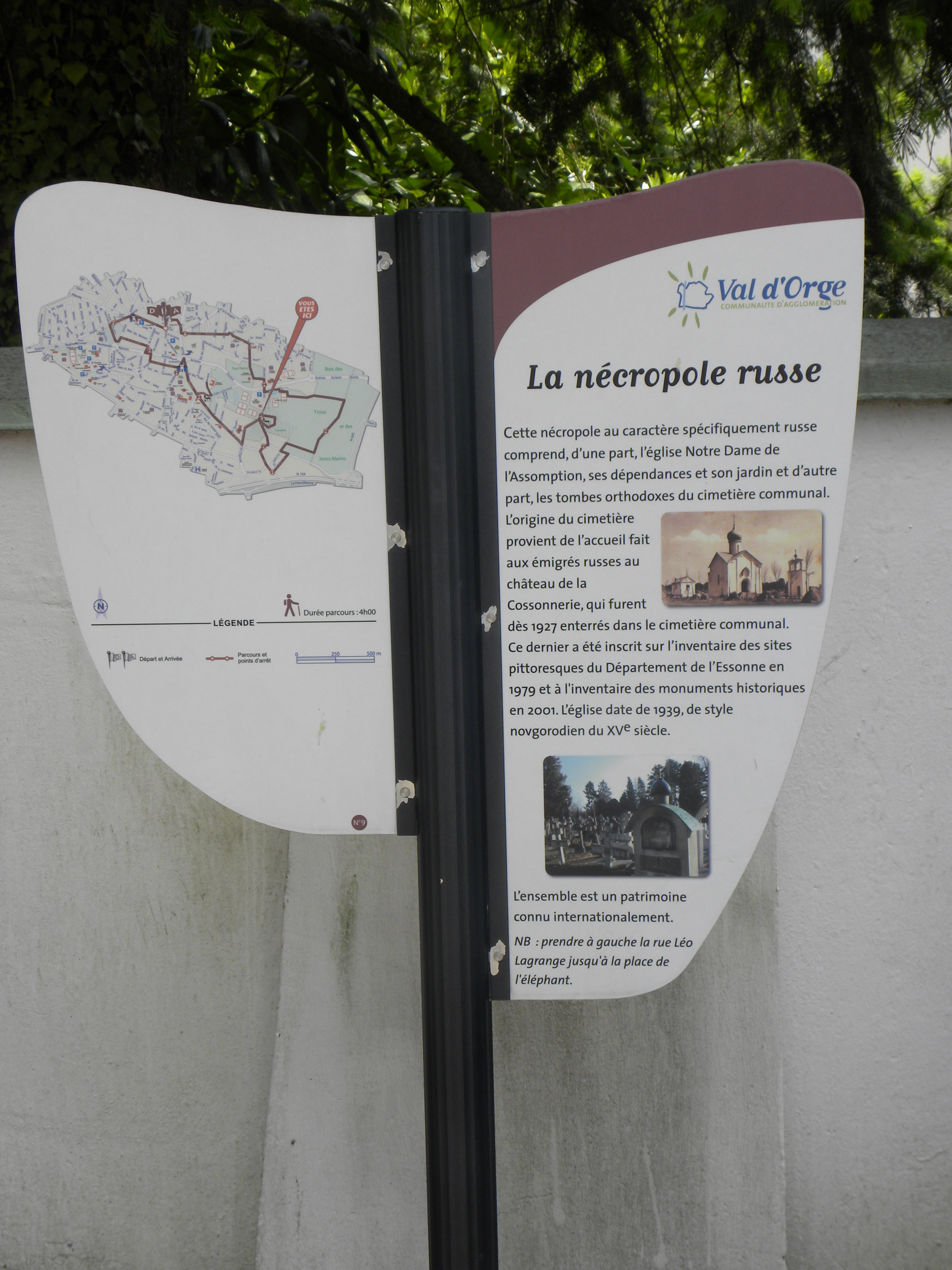
Description for pedestrians

== Location ==
The cemetery is located on Rue Léo Lagrange in Sainte-Geneviève-des-Bois. There are two entrances both on Rue Léo Lagrange.

== Public transport ==
There is a bus station (Piscine) opposite the intersection with Rue Léo Lagrange leading to the cemetery. The nearest train stations are at Sainte-Geneviève-des-Bois and Saint-Michel-sur-Orge.
