= Julius Conus =

Russian composer (1869–1942)

Julius or Jules Conus (Russian: Юлий Эдуардович Конюс, romanized: Yuliy Eduardovich Konyus; 1 February 1869 – 3 January 1942) was a Russian violinist and composer.

== Early life and education ==
Conus was born in Moscow, the son of Eduard Conus, a pianist, composer and teacher of French descent born in Saratov. His mother, Klotilda (sometimes Clothilde) Adolfovna, née Tambroni, was of Italian parentage and born in St Petersburg. His brothers were the musicians Georgi Conus and Lev Conus. All three brothers studied in the Moscow Conservatory; among their teachers were Sergei Taneyev and Anton Arensky.

Following in the footsteps of his brother Georgi Conus, Julius entered the Moscow Conservatory. Here he studied composition under Sergei Taneyev and Anton Arensky, and violin under Jan Hřímalý. He graduated in 1888, receiving a gold medal. Within a year, and through the personal recommendation of Pyotr Ilyich Tchaikovsky, he was sent to Paris to further develop his violin skills at the Conservatoire de Paris under Lambert Massart.

== Tours and concerts ==
During his time at the Conservatoire de Paris, Conus began a successful career, playing first with the Paris National Academy of Music (Paris Opera) as first chair violin under Édouard Colonne. At the same time, Conus was encouraged by Pyotr Ilyich Tchaikovsky to pursue a concertmaster position with the New York Symphony Orchestra. He met with the orchestra's director, Walter Damrosch in Berlin and secured the roles of concertmaster and first violin.

== Correspondence with Tchaikovsky ==
Documentation of the mentorship between Tchaikovsky and Conus are evident in 13 letters from Tchaikovsky to Conus, dating from 1891 to 1893. The selections below highlight Tchaikovsky's influence on Conus's life.

- Letter 4374 – 23 April/5 May 1891, from New York

In this letter, Tchaikovsky urges Conus to connect with Damrosch in Berlin and encourages him to fill the position of concertmaster-soloist that Damrosch seeks.

- Letter 4410 – 15/27 June 1891, from Maydanovo

In this letter, Tchaikovsky applauds Conus's decision to travel to America (along with Adolph Brodsky, following the invitation from Damrosch to serve as his newest concertmaster for the New York Symphony Orchestra.

- Letter 4596 – 10/22 January 1892, from Paris

In this letter Tchaikovsky offers words of encouragement and support for Conus, "I am sorry that your letters are filled with a spirit of sadness and despondency. Why is this? I think it may because you haven't yet played in public, and haven't received the acclaim you deserve. But by the time that these lines reach you, I hope that circumstances will have changed. I also hope that your temporary auditory nerve disorder has passed. Generally, I want to advise you to be very confident in yourself, not to succumb to self-doubt, and to be as you were 6 years ago in this respect. Paris had such a beneficial effect on your playing that you began to play with much more refinement. But it's as though you have less courage and virtuoso bravura. Be conscious of your enormous talent, and that you should surpass every living violinist. Be bolder, more confident in yourself, and never doubt your great powers, not even for a moment."

- Letter 4638 – 9/21 March 1892, from Maydanovo

Tchaikovsky replies to a recent missive from Conus, detailing his life in America, following a concert in Philadelphia. In this letter, there is little talk of music. Instead, Tchaikovsky shows eager interest in "one important thing that you have never written to me about, namely: do you already speak English? I'm very curious to know." He ends the letter inviting Conus to visit him during the summer, noting that "If financial matters are putting you off, contact your most sincere friend (i.e. me), who has now earned a lot of capital from his operas, and will be glad to help you. I swear that nobody will ever know. And it will be a great pleasure for me."

- Letter 4699 – 26 May/7 June 1892, from Klin

In this letter Tchaikovsky is keen to meet with Conus, and send a portrait of himself for Conus to deliver to Damrosch.

- Letter 4856 – 5/17 February 1893, from Klin

In this letter Tchaikovsky uses a personal nickname for Conus, a play on his first name (Julius), Zhulik. Here, he asks Conus about his plans to form a quartet, but is most interested the personal accounts of Conus's life, asking, "tell me Zhulik, why in your last letter was there not even a small hint about all the matters contained in the previous one? Why don't you write anything this time about either the quartet, or, the main thing, about your marriage plans? For that is the major interest. Or has all of that gone down the drain? Please, when you have time, answer all these questions." Further, he closes the note showing concern for Conus' writing, "There is a sad note in your letter. Pour out your feelings on my friendly chest, dear Zhulik. Are you coming back to Russia? When are we going to meet?"

- Letter 5013 – 16/28 August 1893, from Klin

A telegram asking Conus to bring his violin on the Wednesday morning train, and leave the next evening.

- Letter 5016 – 20 August/1 September 1893, from Klin

In this letter Tchaikovsky sends updating viola/violin pieces to Conus asking for review, guidance, and "opinion as soon as possible," on its worth. This letter shows Tchaikovsky's informality and ease of conversation with Conus, fearing no criticism from Conus, but jokingly threatening that if Conus finds the updated music difficult, then the first thing Tchaikovsky will do is "hang you on the first aspen I come across."

An additional 16 replies from Conus to Tchaikovsky, dating from 1889 to 1893, are preserved in the Tchaikovsky State House-Museum, but have not been digitized.

== Return to Russia ==
In 1893 Conus returned to Moscow to teach at the conservatory alongside his brother Georgi Conus. During this time, he also assisted in the technical aspects of the violin parts for Tchaikovsky's Symphony No. 6, while his brother, Lev Conus, assisted with the arrangement for piano duet. According to one source, the Morceaux de salon, Op. 6 by Rachmaninoff were dedicated to Conus. In 1894 he joined Rachmaninoff's quartet.

== Violin Concerto ==
Arguably Conus's legacy survives due to the popularity of his Concerto in E minor for violin, completed in 1898 and dedicated to his professor Jan Hřímalý. This composition, which has been recorded by many, was best championed by Jascha Heifetz, who regularly included it in his repertoire.

== Russian Revolution ==
As a result of the civil unrest following the Russian Revolution, an exodus of the aristocratic intelligentsia erupted, prompting Conus to relocate. Although Eduard Conus had settled in Russia in the early nineteenth century, he had not renounced his foreign citizenship. Therefore, Conus was able to gain exit visas to relocate his family to Paris, France, in 1918. Here he stayed to teach at the Russian Conservatory, which still exists as the Conservatoire Rachmaninoff. He also worked as an editor at the Editions Russes (Russian Music Publishing, also known as the Publishing House of S.A. and N.K. Koussevitzky), founded by Serge Koussevitzky.

== Musical marriage ==
The years in Paris brought many trials to the Conuses who had fled Russia. However, comfort was sought in their enduring friendships with fellow artists such as Sergei Rachmaninoff. Indeed, the bond with Rachmaninoff was strengthened as a result of the marriage of their children. By December 1931, Rachmaninoff's daughter, Tatiana, was engaged to marry Conus's son, Boris.

== Enemy of the State ==
In 1938, while visiting his niece, Olga Alexandrovna Khreptovich-Buteneva, at the Khreptovich family estate in Shchorsy, Poland (now Belarus), Conus was arrested by the Red Army. Olga would later publish Fracture (1939-1942): Memories, a memoir recounting the exile and persecution of the region and its inhabitants. He was soon released and returned to Moscow in 1939. Once in Moscow, Conus took up a position at Moscow State Pedagogical University and continued to compose. He joined the Union of Russian Composers.

== Mysterious death ==
Julius Conus returned to Moscow in 1939, dying there in 1942. It is not known how he died, or where he is buried.
