= Georgi Conus =

Russian music theorist and composer

Georgi Eduardovich Conus
- Георгий Эдуардович Конюс
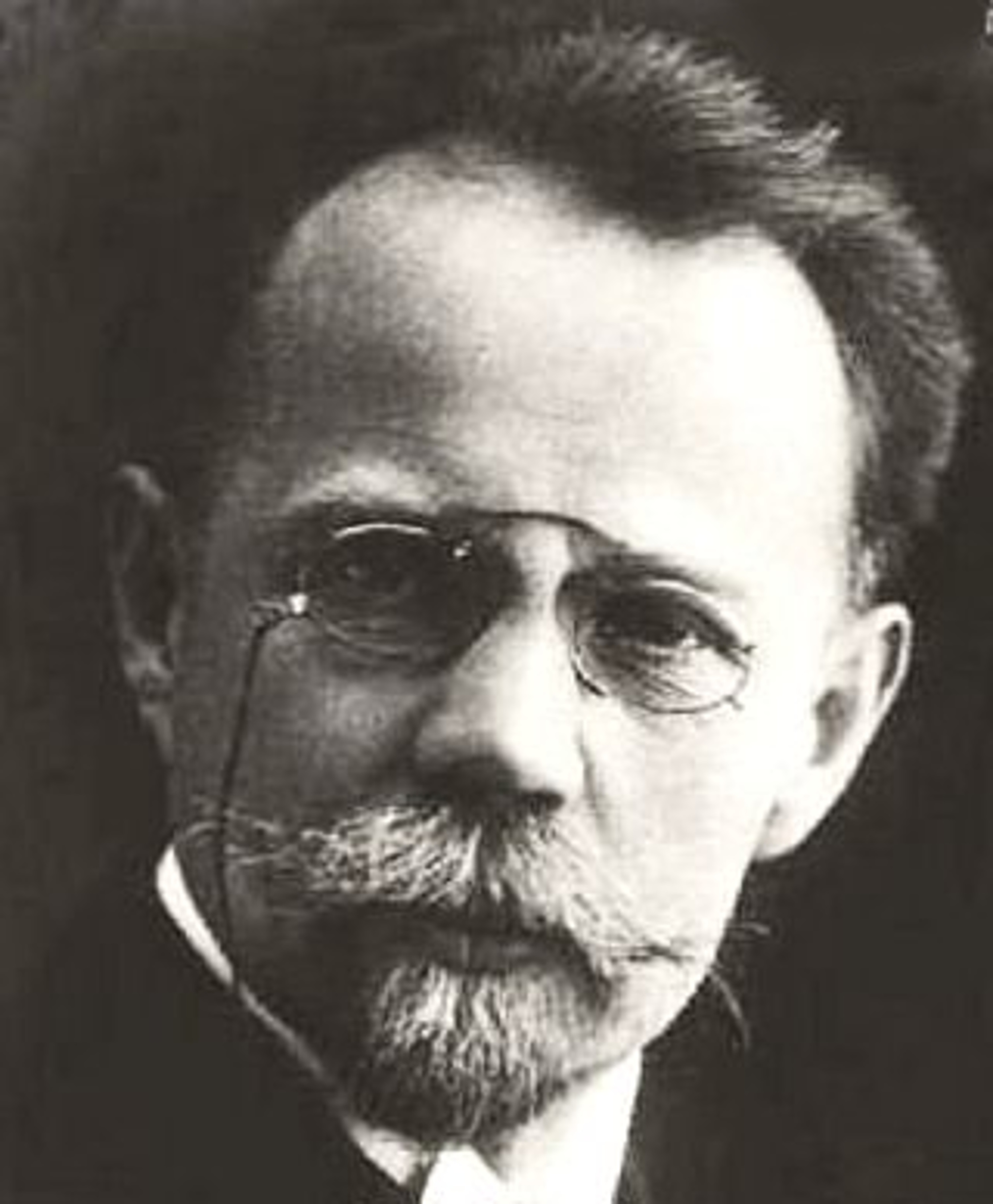
- Georgi Conus, in c. 1912
- Born: September 30, 1862; Moscow, Russian Empire
- Died: August 29, 1933 (aged 70); Moscow, Russian SFSR, Soviet Union
- Other name: Georges Conus
- Occupations: Music theorist; composer

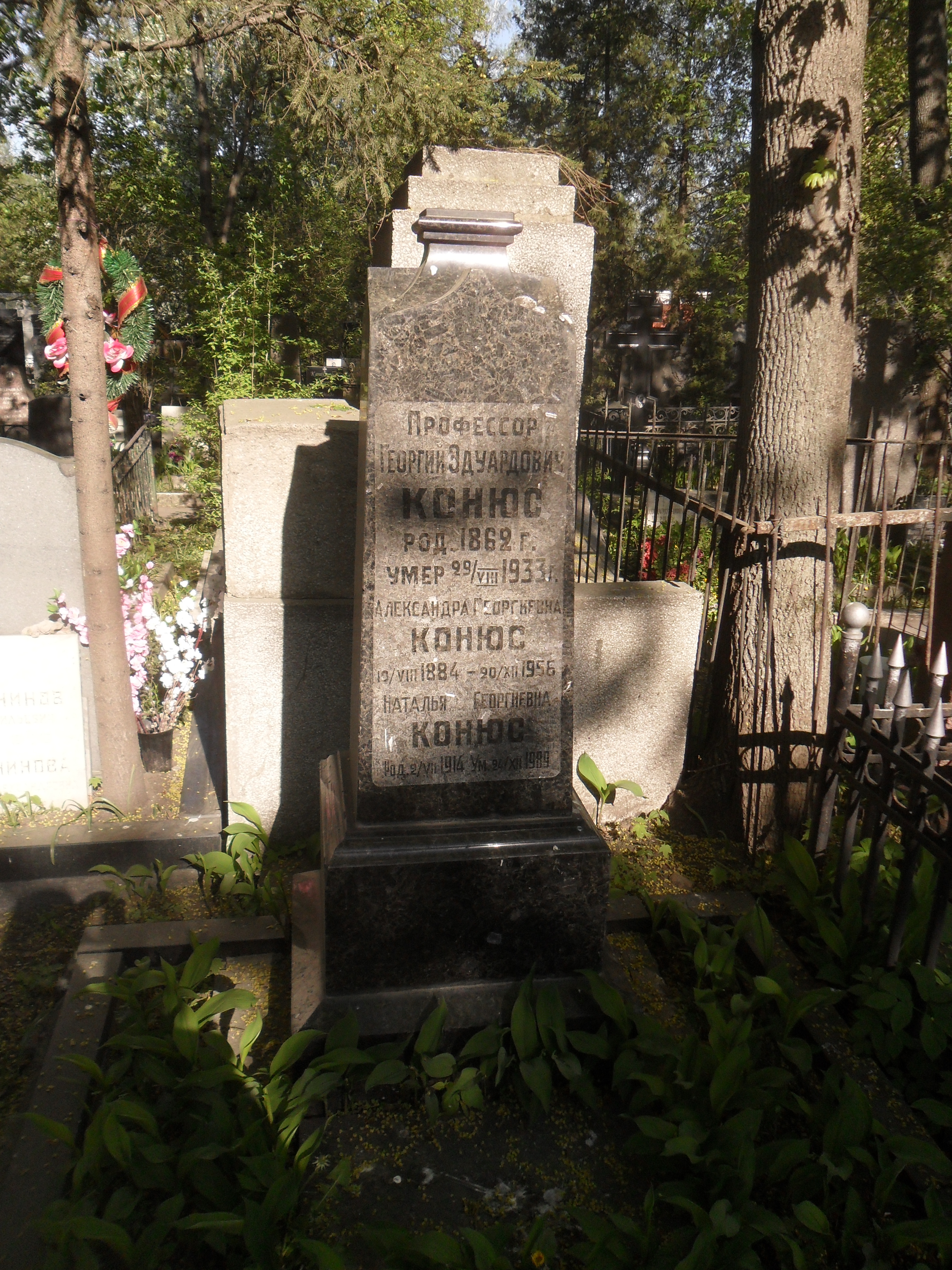

Georgi Eduardovich Conus (Note: Russian: Георгий Эдуардович Конюс, romanized: Georgy Eduardovich Konyus; French: Georges Conus) (Russian: Георгий Эдуардович Конюс; 30 September [O.S. 18 September] 1862 – 29 August 1933) was a Russian music theorist and composer of French descent.

He is buried in Novodevichy Cemetery, Moscow.

== Family and Education ==
He was the eldest of the three Conus brothers, of whom the others were Julius and Lev, and son to Eduard Konstantinovich Conus, a pianist and composer, and Klotilda (sometimes Clothilde in French) Adolfovna, née Tambroni. His father never intended originally for him to become a professional musician but seeing as this was incompatible with his son, in 1881 he successfully gained admission to the Moscow Conservatory.

Originally, Conus decided to pursue a career as a professional pianist, studying with Pavel Pabst. However, after an injury he later pursued composition, studying instead with Sergei Taneyev and Anton Arensky. Give his competency, Conus, along with other students, gained the attention of Pyotr Ilyich Tchaikovsky. Moreover, at the age of 14 Conus began teaching, firstly at the Chernavsky Institute (also known as Usachevsko-Chernyavskya School), in 1891 being invited again to teach counterpoint and harmony, being praised by those like Aleksandr Goldenweiser for his skill.

== Royal Support ==
On the eve of his death, Pyotr Ilyich Tchaikovsky wrote a letter with the intent on it being published in the local newspaper, Vedomosti, praising Conus's musical mastery showcased in his latest suite, Scènes Enfantines, Op.1 (1893). However, the letter was not sent, but became famous after Tchaikovsky's death, and Conus was awarded by Tsar Nicholas II an annual stipend of 1200 rubles "as long as he continues his compositional activity" (quoted from the letter of the Application Department of His Majesty's Cabinet at the Moscow Conservatory of March 26, 1894, stored in Konyus' personal file at the Moscow Conservatory).

== Career ==
In 1889 Conus graduated from the Moscow Conservatory as a composer and began to teach counterpoint and instrumentation soon after. The first famed performance of Conus' music was in 1886, his "Ballad for Orchestra" conducted by Taneyev, followed in 1890 by his symphonic picture, "Forest Murmurs," conducted by Vasily Safonov. Many of his early works generated large amounts of interest in him, his nine-movement work, "From Childhood Life," having performances both in Europe and the United States, gaining the eye of Tchaikovsky as well.

As a result of the 'Conus Affair,' a disagreement in the role of theoretical classes at the Moscow Conservatory, from 1901 to 1912, Conus leaned into his compositional career. Additionally, in 1902 he began acting as the director of the Music and Drama School of the Moscow Philharmonic Society, although being dismissed in 1905 alongside contemporaries like Boleslav Yavorsky. Soon after, in 1912 Conus would begin teaching at Saratov Conservatory and in 1917, he arose to be the director.

Following the October Revolution and creation of the Soviet Union, Conus moved back to Moscow to lead the special education within the Main Directorate of Vocational Education (Glavprofobr). In 1919, he rejoined the Moscow Conservatory and remained there as a teacher for the rest of his life, although for ten years (1921-31), he acted as the head of the Laboratory of Metrotectonic Analysis of the State Institute of Music Science.

He had a marked influence upon such students as Alexander Scriabin and Reinhold Glière. For a time, much was expected of Georgi as a composer. Tchaikovsky thought so highly of his promise that he obtained for him the Tsar's annual stipend of 1200 rubles awarded to deserving musicians. Georgi did indeed compose songs, a ballet, a cantata, two symphonic poems, and a variety of other instrumental works. None of these have entered the international repertoire, and Georgi ultimately became more and more immersed in musical academics, formulating an abstruse theory called metrotectonicism based around the scientific measurement of symmetrical temporal structures in musical forms as resulting from unconscious attachments to balance. So important was metrotectonicism that during the 1920s, it was a central research theme at the Moscow Conservatory and had its own department, led by Conus. Conus attempted to popularize his theory through lectures tours within Europe.

== The Conus Affair ==
During the 19th-century, under the directorship of Safonov, the Moscow Conservatory had shied away from teaching too much theoretical material to students, considering it an unpractical usage of their conservatory time. While many did not want to upset the directorship, others had no problem doing so, one of those being Conus, supported by others like Taneyev. Eventually, word of the conflict grew and support for Conus' advocacy for theoretical work came from luminaries like Tchaikovsky, Eduard Nápravník, and Rimsky-Korsakov. Alexander Scriabin, a student of Conus', had written a letter to Mitrofan Belyayev where he remarked that Conus had been exceptionally rude to Safonov. Nevertheless, in 1899 Conus was dismissed from the conservatory, although picking up work elsewhere shortly after.

== Students ==
- E. Bekman-Shcherbina
- Sergei Vasilenko
- Alexander Gedike
- Rheinhold Gliere
- Aleksandr Goldenweiser
- Nikolai Medtner
- Vyacheslav Paskhalov
- Dmitry Rogal-Levitsky
- Igor Sposobin
- Boris Khaikin
- P.avel Chesnokov
- Maskvey Blanter

== Works ==
- 1933: "How the metrotectonic method studies the form of musical organisms"
- 1935: "Course of Strict Contrapuntal Writing in Modes, A Critique of Traditional Theory of Musical Form, Metrotectonic Research on Musical Form and Scientific Research on Musical Syntax"
