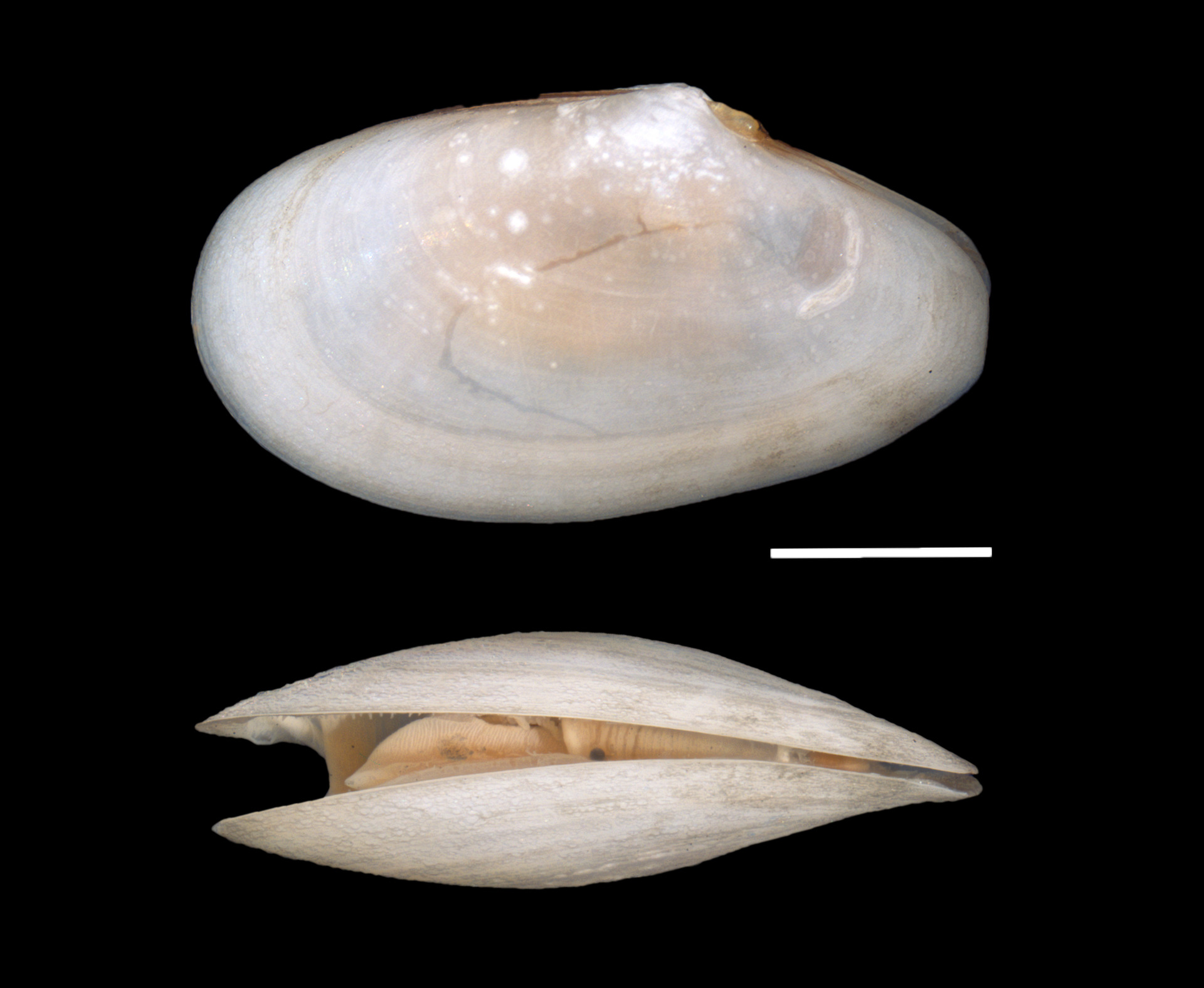
- Macoma tenta shell

Scientific classification
- Kingdom: Animalia
- Phylum: Mollusca
- Class: Bivalvia
- Order: Cardiida
- Family: Tellinidae
- Genus: Macoma
- Species: M. tenta

Binomial name
- Macoma tenta (Say, 1834)

= Macoma tenta =

Species of bivalve

Macoma tenta, the narrowed macoma clam or elongate macoma is a species of clam, a marine bivalve mollusk (bivalvia) in the family Tellinidae and genus Macoma. Macoma tenta are one of two species of macoma clams that can be found in the Chesapeake Bay on the eastern shore of the United States in Maryland and Virginia. The macoma tenta like their cousin in the Chesapeake, the Macoma balthica or Baltic macoma clam, are small marine bivalves with thin, chalky white shells. They tend to live buried in the sandy or muddy areas of shallow water in the middle and lower Chesapeake Bay. Macoma clams are among the most abundant clams in the Chesapeake Bay. Macomas first appeared about 750,000 years ago.

== Appearance ==
Chesapeake Bay Macoma clams (both balthica and tenta) have thin and fragile shells. The elongate macoma (Macoma tenta) get their name from their elongated shell with a shell proportion (width/length) that is greater than 1.5. The narrowed macoma clam’s shells tend to be more elongated than the Baltic macoma’s shells and have a smoother, pearly sheen that is slightly iridescent. The smooth shell may have several fine concentric growth lines which indicate yearly growth. Their color is white to yellowish compared to the pinkish tint of the Baltic macoma clam. They have a narrowed posterior end that is slightly twisted or curved to the left and the anterior end is long and rounded. These clams have one foot which helps to hold them in place and two siphons, tube-like structures in which water flows. Their long, thin, flexible siphons are of unequal length and fully retractable. The narrowed macoma clam only grows to a length of approximately three-quarters of an inch.

== Habitat and distribution ==
The macoma tenta clams tend to burrow under the sand, sandy mud, and mud along the shoreline and in shallow, subtidal waters of the middle and lower Chesapeake Bay. While populous in the Chesapeake Bay, the macoma tenta can also be found in other waters of North America and the Western North Atlantic Ocean including the Guld of Mexico and the Caribbean Sea. They can lie either vertically or horizontally in their sandy and muddy habitat and are able to shift positions frequently in search of food. They will also quickly move or burrow down deeper when disturbed.

== Prey and predators ==
The clam’s two siphons stick up above the surface when the clams are buried in the sand or mud. The longer of the two siphons sucks in tiny bits of food lying on the Bay’s bottom by brushing across the sediment; they also consume microplankton filtered through the siphoned sea water. Waste and unused water are then expelled through the second siphon. Macoma tenta clams’ long siphons resemble worms crawling along the bottom and thus attract many predators such as American eels. Cownose rays also eat macoma clams by flapping their fins against the sand to reveal the buried clams.

== Reproduction ==
Male macoma clams release sperm into the water column and female macoma clams release eggs. Upon fertilization, eggs develop into clam larvae with two small transparent shells and a small foot. The larvae float in the bay currents for a few weeks before settling to the bottom of the bay, anchoring themselves to sand grains.

== Ecology ==
Development along shorelines may have negative impacts on the habitats of these marsh-dwelling bivalves. Researchers have seen higher density and more diversity of some benthic bivalve species in natural marsh areas compared to those that have been impacted by residential, commercial or industrial development. Deposit-feeding species are particularly vulnerable to depletion of their food source along the shoreline.
