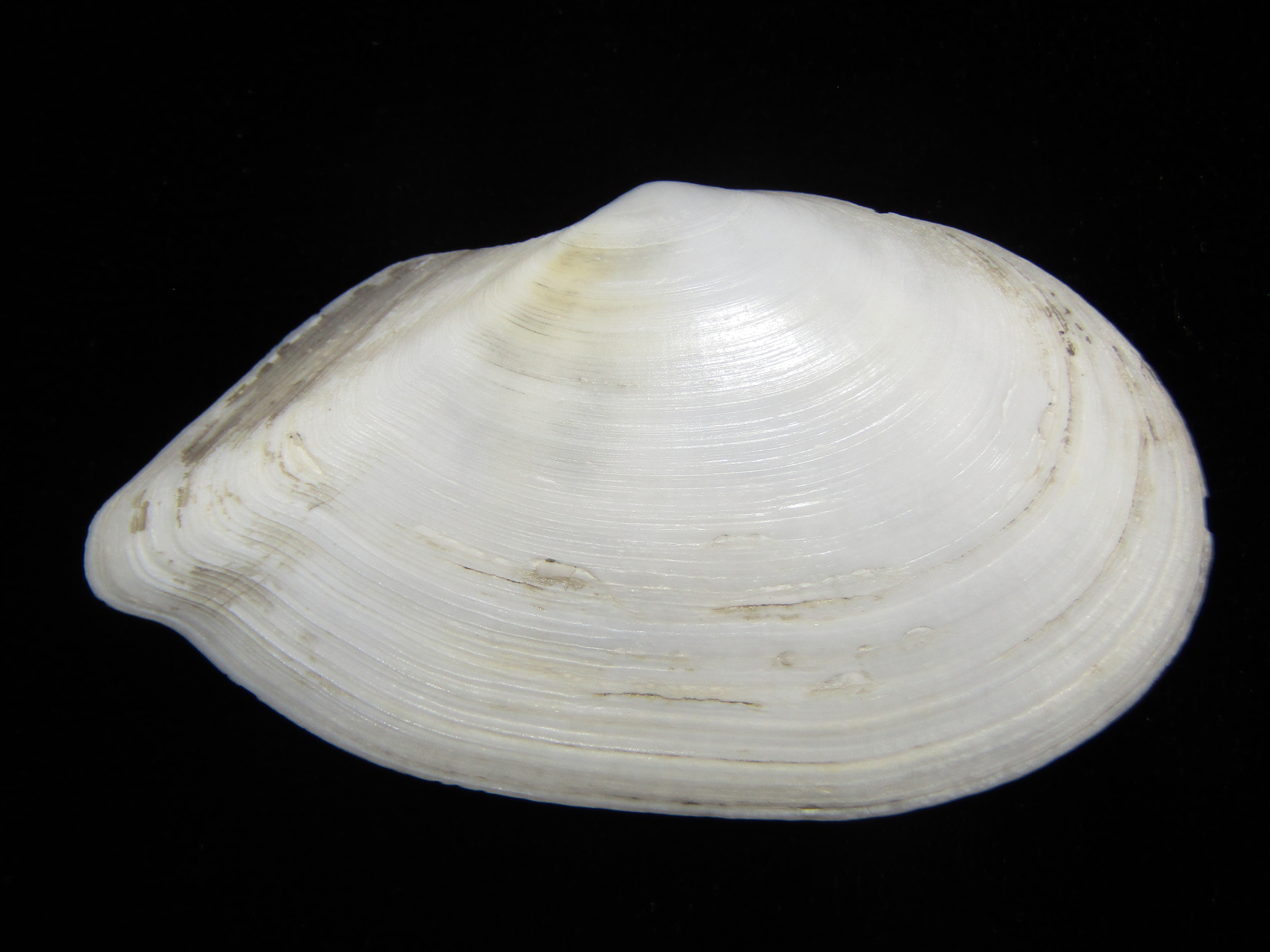

Scientific classification
- Kingdom: Animalia
- Phylum: Mollusca
- Class: Bivalvia
- Order: Cardiida
- Family: Tellinidae
- Genus: Ardeamya
- Species: A. spenceri

Binomial name
- Ardeamya spenceri Iredale, 1915

= Ardeamya spenceri =

Species of bivalve

Ardeamya spenceri, or Spencer's wedge shell, is a rare bivalve mollusc of the family Tellinidae, endemic to New Zealand.
