= Hanleyanus oblongus =

Scientific classification
- Domain: Eukaryota
- Kingdom: Animalia
- Phylum: Mollusca
- Class: Bivalvia
- Order: Cardiida
- Family: Tellinidae
- Genus: Hanleyanus
- Species: H. oblongus

Binomial name
- Hanleyanus oblongus (Gmelin, 1791)

Synonyms
- Angulus emarginatus (G.B. Sowerby I, 1825); Angulus oblongus Megerle von Mühlfeld, 1811; Tellina (Angulus) emarginata G. B. Sowerby I, 1825; Tellina carinata Spengler, 1798; Tellina emarginata (Sowerby I, 1825); Tellina oblonga Gmelin, 1791 (original combination); Tellinides emarginatus G.B. Sowerby I, 1825

Species of bivalve

Hanleyanus oblongus is a species of bivalve in the genus Hanleyanus.
