= Tellina carpenteri =

Scientific classification
- Domain: Eukaryota
- Kingdom: Animalia
- Phylum: Mollusca
- Class: Bivalvia
- Order: Cardiida
- Family: Tellinidae
- Genus: Tellina
- Species: T. carpenteri

Binomial name
- Tellina carpenteri Dall, 1900

Species of bivalve

Tellina carpenteri, the carpenter tellin, is a bivalve mollusc in the family Tellinidae, the tellins. Synonyms include Tellina arenica (Hertlein and Strong, 1949), Tellina variegata (Carpenter, 1864) and Tellina (Moerella) carpenteri (Dall).
