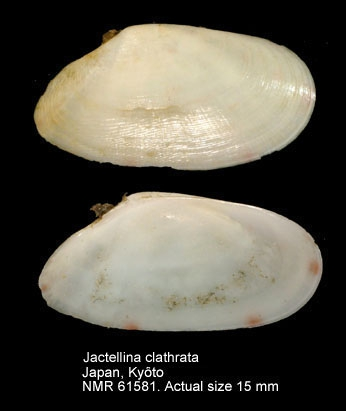
- A shell of Jactellina clathrata. Note portion of large external ligament still attached to upper left of each oval, elongated valve.

Scientific classification
- Kingdom: Animalia
- Phylum: Mollusca
- Class: Bivalvia
- Order: Cardiida
- Family: Tellinidae
- Genus: Jactellina
- Species: J. clathrata

Binomial name
- Jactellina clathrata (Deshayes, 1835)

= Jactellina clathrata =

Species of mollusks

Jactellina clathrata, commonly known as the shiborizakura tellin (squeezed cherry blossom tellin), is a species of tellinid, a marine bivalve mollusk in the family Tellinidae.

== Description ==
The shells of these burrowing tellins are oval, elongated and much flattened. The two valves are connected by a large external ligament. They burrow into neritic (or sublittoral) sand habitats. Deshayes originally described Jactellina clathrata as having characteristics similar to Fabulina fabula, which burrows into silty sand in sublittoral habitats and extends an inhalant siphon above the sediment surface to feed. The inhalant siphon sucks in suspended particles and vacuums up detritus from the sediment surface. A second siphon expels the filtered intake.

== Distribution ==
This species occurs widely in Western Pacific Ocean and along northern Australia, East Timor, Solomon Islands, Papua New Guinea, Fiji, Japan, Hawaii and Vanuatu. On some tropical shores they are among the most abundant occur bivalves.

== Habitat ==
These tellins live in sands in the neritic zone (sublittoral zone).
