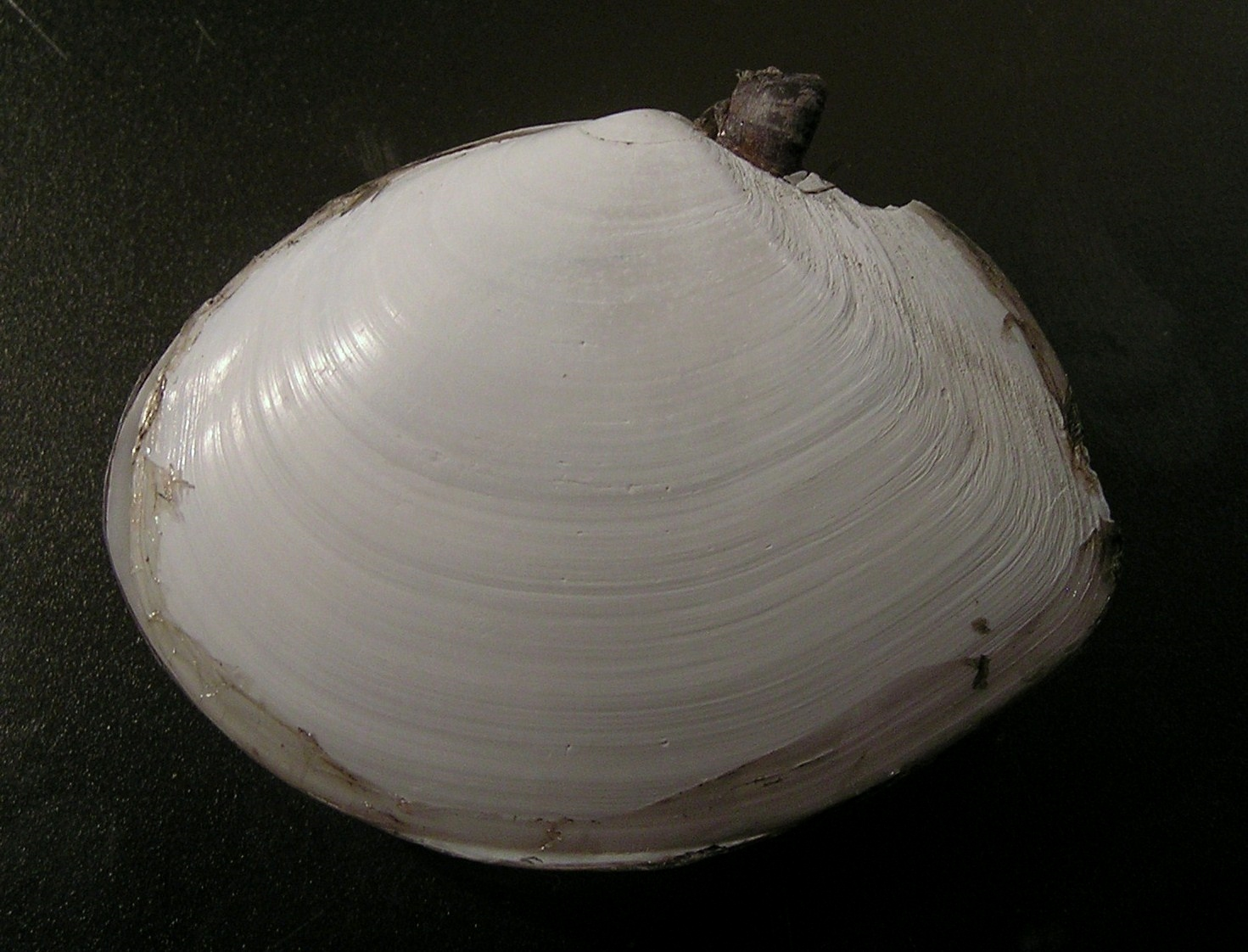
- Macoma secta, the white-sand macoma

Scientific classification
- Domain: Eukaryota
- Kingdom: Animalia
- Phylum: Mollusca
- Class: Bivalvia
- Order: Cardiida
- Superfamily: Tellinoidea
- Family: Tellinidae
- Genus: Macoma; Leach, 1819

Species
- See text.

= Macoma =

Genus of bivalves

Macoma is a large genus of saltwater clams, marine bivalve molluscs in the family Tellinidae, the tellins.

== Species ==
According to the World Register of Marine Species (WoRMS), the following species are included as accepted names within the genus Macoma:

- Macoma acolasta Dall, 1921 – morsel macoma
- Macoma awaijiensis (Sowerby, 1914)
- Macoma biota Arruda & Domaneschi, 2005
- Macoma brota Dall, 1916 – heavy macoma
- Macoma bruuni Nickles, 1955
- Macoma calcarea (Gmelin, 1791) – chalky macoma
- Macoma cancellata (G. B. Sowerby I, 1853)
- Macoma candida (Lamarck, 1818)
- Macoma carlottensis Whiteaves, 1880 – Charlotte macoma
- Macoma cerina Dall, 1900 – waxy macoma
- Macoma cleryana (d'Orbigny, 1846)
- Macoma coani Kafanov & Lutaenko, 1999
- Macoma consociata (Smith, 1885)
- Macoma constricta (Bruguière, 1792) – constricted macoma
- Macoma crassula (Deshayes, 1855) – thick macoma
- Macoma cumana (Costa O.G., 1829)
- Macoma dexioptera Baxter, 1977
- Macoma dubia (Deshayes, 1854)
- Macoma ecuadoriana Pilsbry & Olsson, 1941
- Macoma elimata Dunnill & Coan, 1968
- Macoma elytrum Keen, 1958
- Macoma expansa Carpenter, 1864
- Macoma extenuata Dall, 1900 – slender macoma
- Macoma georgiana Dell, 1964
- Macoma golikovi Scarlato & Kafanov, 1941
- Macoma hanleyi (Dunker, 1853)
- Macoma hemicilla (Iredale, 1936)
- Macoma hesperus Dall, 1908
- Macoma hokkaidoensis Amano, Lutaenko & Matsubara, 1999
- Macoma incongrua (Martens, 1865)
- Macoma indentata Carpenter, 1864
- Macoma inexpectata Cosel, 1995
- Macoma inornata (Hanley, 1844)
- Macoma inquinata (Deshayes, 1855)
- Macoma lama Bartsch, 1929 – Aleutian macoma
- Macoma lamproleuca (Pilsbry & Lowe, 1932)
- Macoma limula Dall, 1895 – little-file macoma
- Macoma lipara Dall, 1916
- Macoma litoralis (Krauss, 1848)
- Macoma loveni (A. S. Jensen, 1905) – inflated macoma, loven macoma
- Macoma lucerna (Hanley, 1844)
- Macoma melo (Sowerby G.B. II, 1866)
- Macoma middendorffi Dall, 1884
- Macoma mitchelli Dall, 1895 – Matagorda macoma, mitchell macoma
- Macoma moesta (Deshayes, 1855) – flat macoma
- Macoma murrayana (Salisbury, 1934)
- Macoma nasuta (Conrad, 1837) – bent-nosed clam
- Macoma nobilis (Hanley, 1845)
- Macoma obliqua (J. Sowerby, 1817)
- Macoma panamensis Dall, 1900
- Macoma phenax Dall, 1900 – cheating macoma
- Macoma praetexta (Martens, 1865)
- Macoma pseudofallax Cosel, 1995
- Macoma pseudomera Dall & Simpson, 1901 – mera macoma
- Macoma pulleyi Boyer, 1969 – delta macoma, pulley macoma
- Macoma retrorsa (G. B. Sowerby II, 1867)
- Macoma secta (Conrad, 1837)
- Macoma shiratoriensis (Matsubara, 1994)
- Macoma siliqua (C. B. Adams, 1852)
- Macoma subovata (Sowerby, 1867)
- Macoma tageliformis Dall, 1900 – tagelus macoma
- Macoma takahokoensis Yamamoto & Habe, 1959
- Macoma tenta (Say, 1834) – elongate macoma
- Macoma tokyoensis Makiyama, 1927
- Macoma torelli (Jensen, 1905) – triangular macoma
- Macoma uruguayensis (E. A. Smith, 1885)
- Macoma vappa (Iredale, 1929)
- Macoma ventricosa (Deshayes, 1855)
- Macoma yoldiformis Carpenter, 1864
