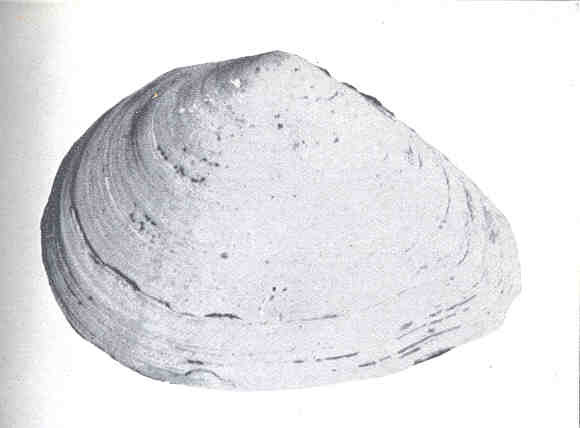

Scientific classification
- Domain: Eukaryota
- Kingdom: Animalia
- Phylum: Mollusca
- Class: Bivalvia
- Order: Cardiida
- Family: Tellinidae
- Genus: Macoma
- Species: M. nasuta

Binomial name
- Macoma nasuta (Conrad, 1837)

= Macoma nasuta =

Species of bivalve

Macoma nasuta, commonly known as the bent-nosed clam, is a species of bivalve found along the Pacific Ocean coast of North America. It is about 6 cm (2.4 in) long. It is often found buried in sands of 10–20 cm (3.9–7.9 in) in depth. This rounded clam has no radial ribs. Archaeological data supports the use of this species by Native Americans such as the Chumash peoples of central California.

== Names ==
Macoma nasuta is commonly known as the bent-nosed clam or bent-nose Macoma. It is commonly misidentified as either Macoma tersa or Macoma kelseyi.

== Description ==
The hinge plate is without lateral teeth and the length of shell much less than twice the height. Posterior portions of both valves distinctly bent to the right with the siphons distinctly separated (as they are in all Macoma) and have a distinct orange pigmentation. The periostracum is usually very prominent and the shell has a dirty brown wrinkled look to it, especially near the margin.

== Distinguishing characteristics ==
Valves bent rather sharply to the right at the posterior end, orange coloration of its siphons and periostracum is usually very prominent.

== Habitat ==
Common in intertidal and subtidal (50 m) zones; Prefers mud to muddy sand substrates situated in quiet waters and can burrow up to 40 cm beneath the surface sediment. M. nasuta and M. secta are geographically sympatric species and both are the characteristic species of Macoma on the west coast of North America.

== Range ==
Found in the neritic provinces of the eastern Pacific Ocean from Kodiak Island, Alaska, to Cabo San Lucas, Baja California.

== Feeding and digestion ==
Found to feed off the top millimeter of sediment by using a boring motion with the tip of its siphon into the sediment or by using a rotating motion similar to Scrobicularia plana. New sediment is found by moving the siphon into virgin sediment but the clams have also been observed to consume their pseudofeces and feces. It is assumed that the siphon tip is unselective in the particles it intakes.

Non-specific nematodes have been found in the stomach in all stages of digestion from live to empty cuticles. The small (about 500 μm) bivalve Transenella tantilla has also been found living in the stomach. The relationship with both nematodes and T. tantilla is uncertain.

The exhalant siphon is kept below the sediment surface (about 1 cm). The gut clearance time for inert particles of M. nasuta ranges from 1 to 9 hours with smaller particles and diatoms believed to remain longer than other particles ingested due to their disproportionably high presence in the stomach during dissections.

== Bioaccumulation of toxins ==
Due to their feeding behavior of deposit feeding, M. nasuta have been found to have high levels of DDT and PCBs.

== Reproduction ==
M. nasuta is a dioecious (probably gonochoristic) species that spawns in early summer.

== Natural history ==
There is archaeological data to support the use of this species by Native Americans such as the Chumash peoples of central California.

== Predators ==
Shore birds, Lewis' Moon Snail: Polinices lewisii, Starfish: Pisaster spp., Crabs: Cancer productus, Metacarcinus gracilis, Metacarcinus magister.

== Known parasites ==
- Graffilla pugetensi: a parasite of the pericardial cavity.
- Telolecithus pugetensi: uses M. nasuta as a second intermediate host.
