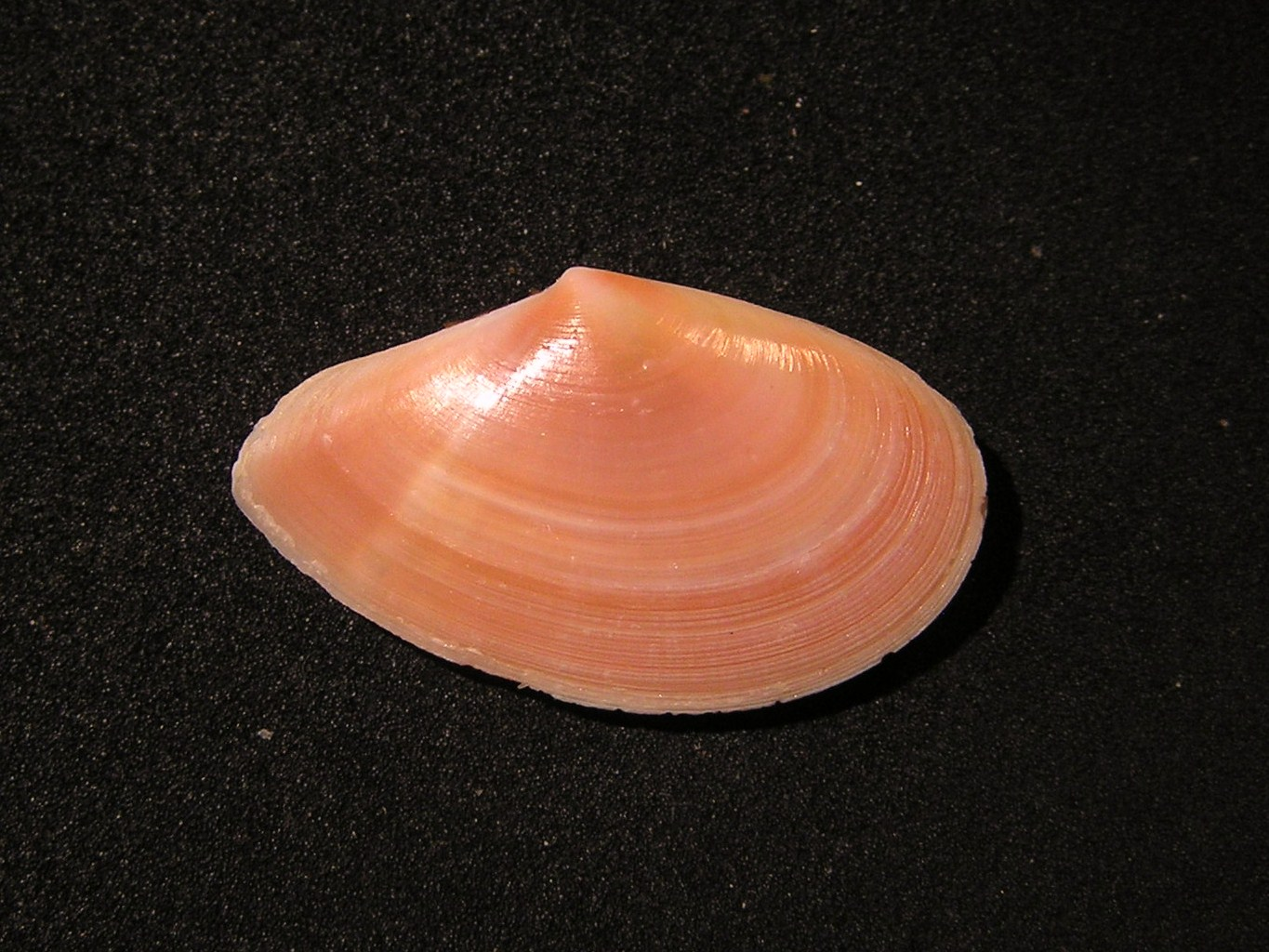

Scientific classification
- Kingdom: Animalia
- Phylum: Mollusca
- Class: Bivalvia
- Order: Cardiida
- Family: Tellinidae
- Genus: Bosemprella
- Species: B. incarnata

Binomial name
- Bosemprella incarnata (Linnaeus, 1758)

Synonyms
- Tellina incarnata Linnaeus, 1758

= Bosemprella incarnata =

Species of bivalve

Bosemprella incarnata is a species of bivalve belonging to the family Tellinidae.

The species is found in Western Europe and Mediterranean.

Right and left valve of the same specimen:

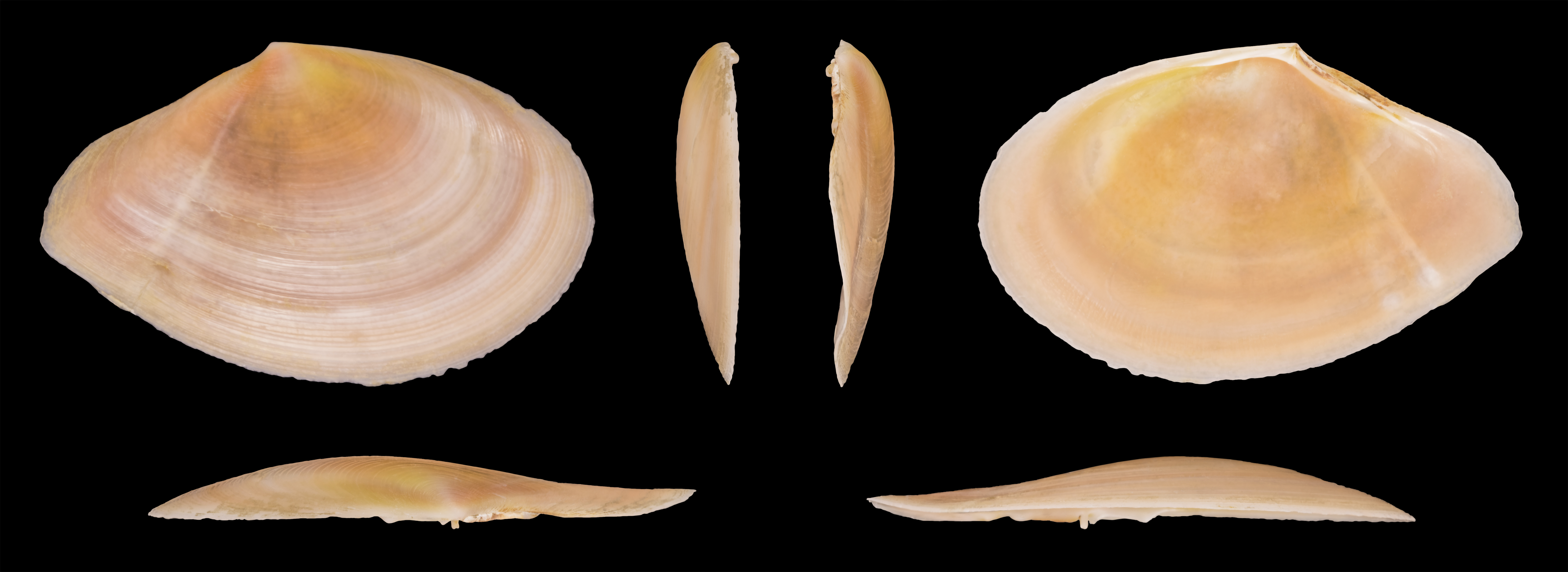
Right valve

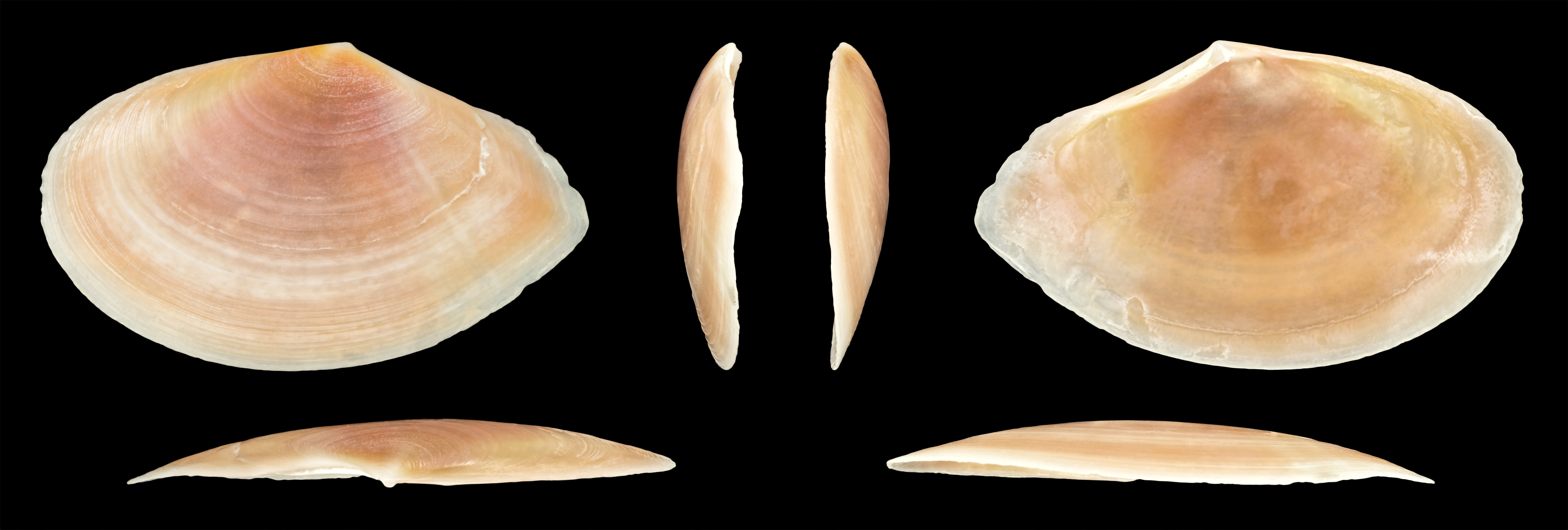
Left valve
