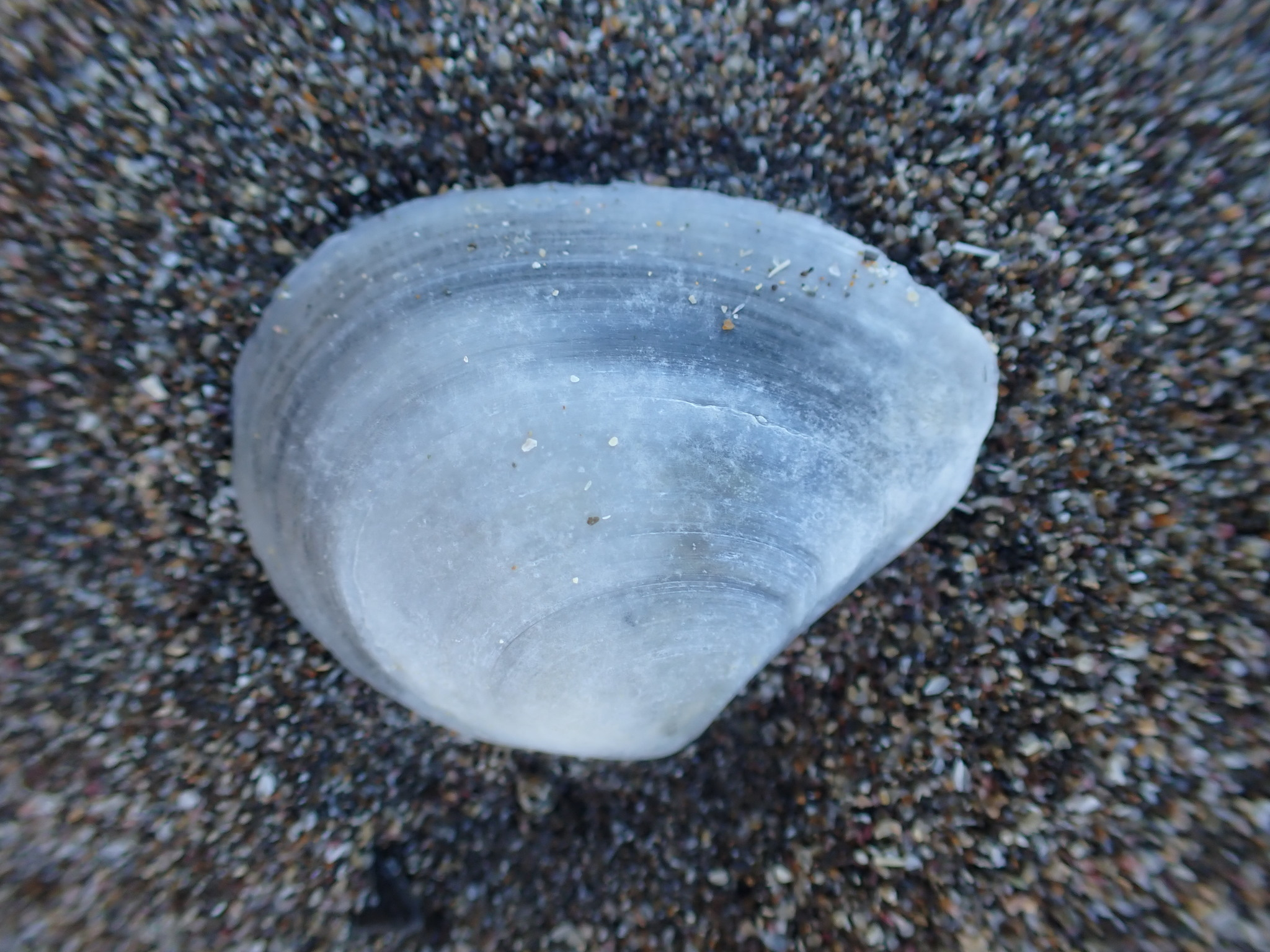

Scientific classification
- Kingdom: Animalia
- Phylum: Mollusca
- Class: Bivalvia
- Order: Cardiida
- Superfamily: Tellinoidea
- Family: Tellinidae
- Genus: Macomona
- Species: M. liliana

Binomial name
- Macomona liliana (Iredale, 1915)

= Macomona liliana =

Species of mollusc

Macomona liliana, or the large wedge shell, is a bivalve mollusc of the family Tellinidae. It is endemic to New Zealand.
