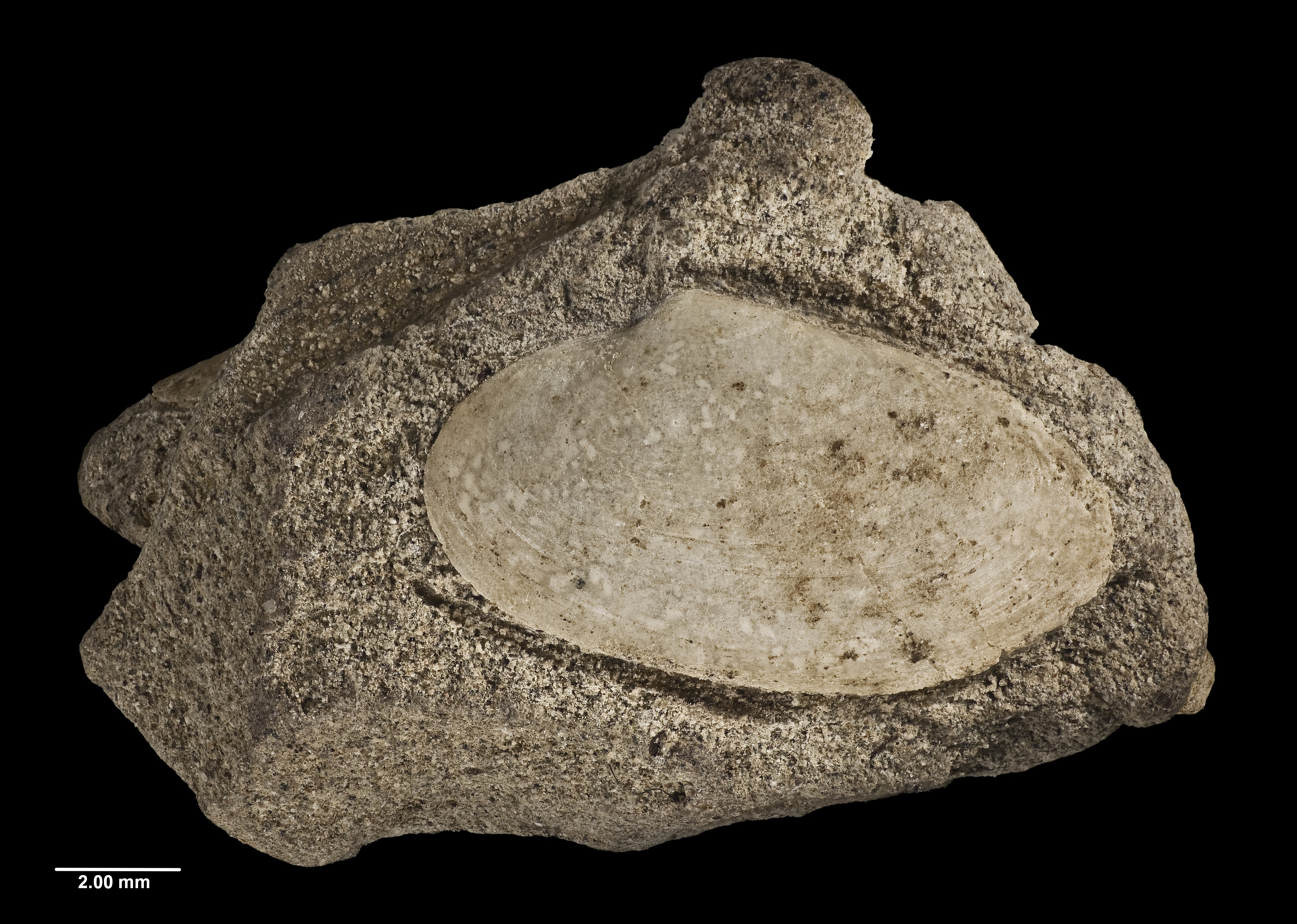
- Holotype from Auckland War Memorial Museum

Scientific classification
- Kingdom: Animalia
- Phylum: Mollusca
- Class: Bivalvia
- Order: Cardiida
- Family: Tellinidae
- Genus: Elliptotellina
- Species: †E. protensa

Binomial name
- †Elliptotellina protensa (A. W. B. Powell, 1935)

Synonyms
- Ascitellina protensa A. W. B. Powell, 1935

= Elliptotellina protensa =

Elliptotellina protensa Temporal range: early Miocene

Extinct species of gastropod

Elliptotellina protensa is an extinct species of bivalve, a marine mollusc, in the family Tellinidae. Fossils of the species date to early Miocene strata of the west coast of the Auckland Region, New Zealand.

== Description ==
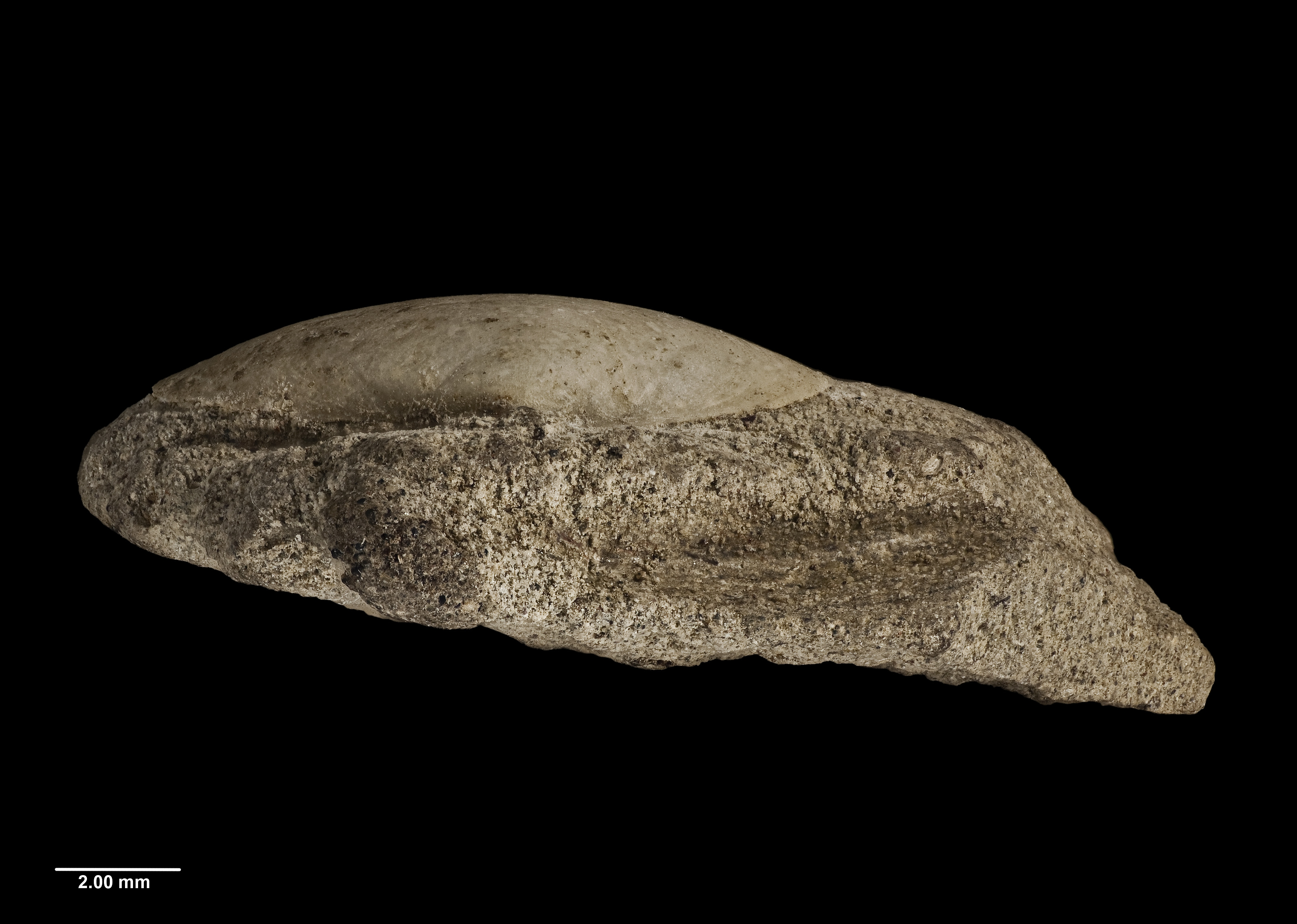
Side view of holotype

In the original description, Powell described the species as follows:

Shell small, thin, compressed, elongate-oval, rounded at both ends. Beaks a little in front of the anterior third, very little raised and directed forwards. Posterior end more narrowly rounded than anterior. Sculpture consisting of fine, somewhat irregular, concentric growth lines.

The holotype of the species measures 11.25 mm (0.443 in) in length and has a height of 6 mm (0.24 in) and a single valve thickness of 1.75 mm (0.069 in). The species can be differentiated from E. urinatoria due to having a more elongate-oval outline, a more narrowly contracted posterior end, and a more irregular sculpture.

== Taxonomy ==
The species was first described by A. W. B. Powell in 1935, using the name Ascitellina protensa. By 1990, Elliptotellina protensa had become the accepted name for the species. The holotype was collected at an unknown date prior to 1935 from north end of Pillow Lava Bay, south of Muriwai, Auckland Region (then more commonly known as Motutara), and is held in the collections of Auckland War Memorial Museum.

== Distribution ==
This extinct marine species occurs in early Miocene strata of the Nihotupu Formation of New Zealand, on the west coast of the Waitākere Ranges of the Auckland Region, New Zealand. Additionally, a fossil found at Pakaurangi Point on the Kaipara Harbour may also be a member of the same species.
