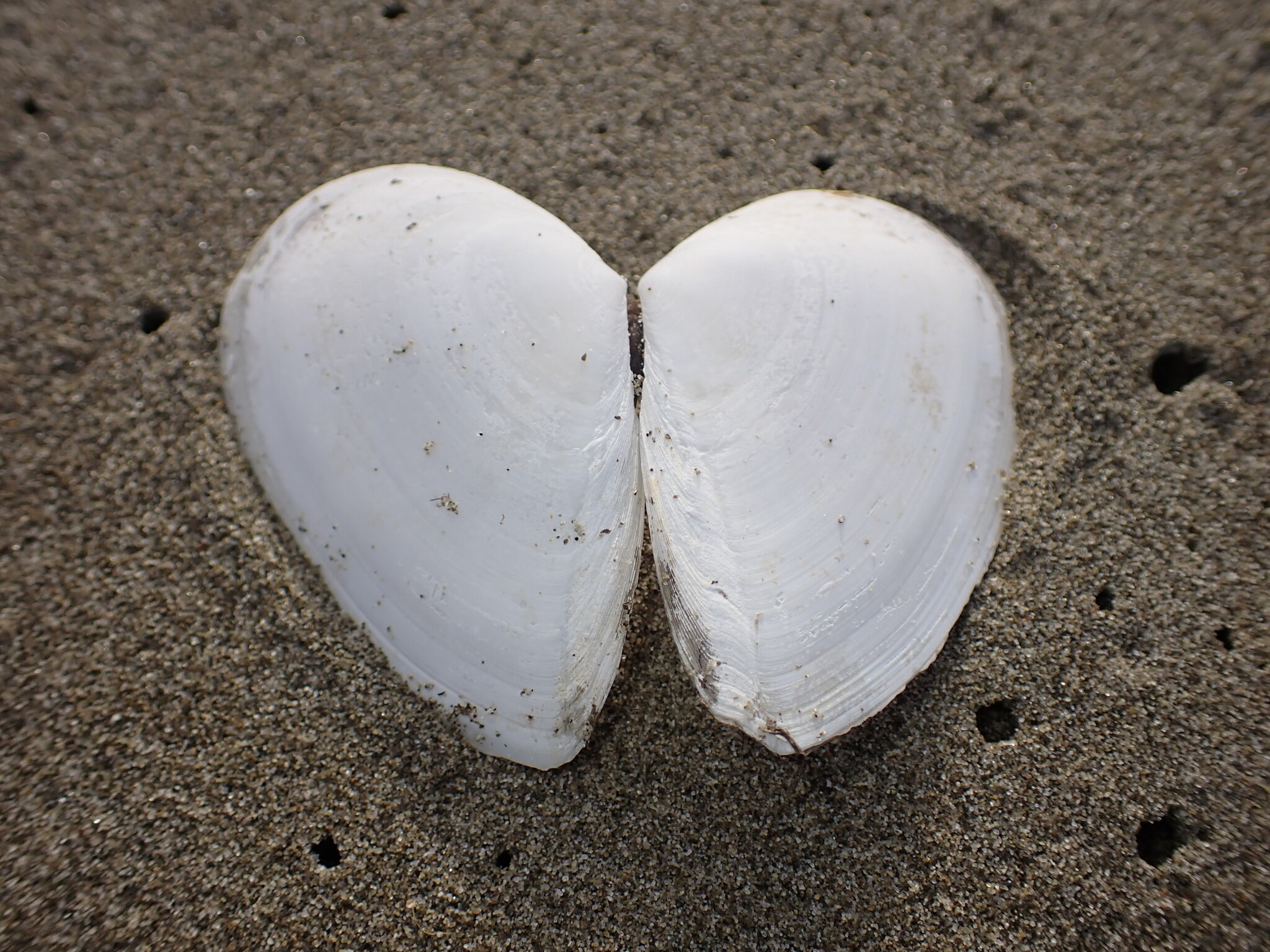

Scientific classification
- Kingdom: Animalia
- Phylum: Mollusca
- Class: Bivalvia
- Order: Cardiida
- Family: Tellinidae
- Genus: Bartschicoma
- Species: B. gaimardi

Binomial name
- Bartschicoma gaimardi Iredale, 1915

= Bartschicoma gaimardi =

Species of bivalve

Bartschicoma gaimardi, the angled wedge shell, is a bivalve mollusc of the family Tellinidae.
