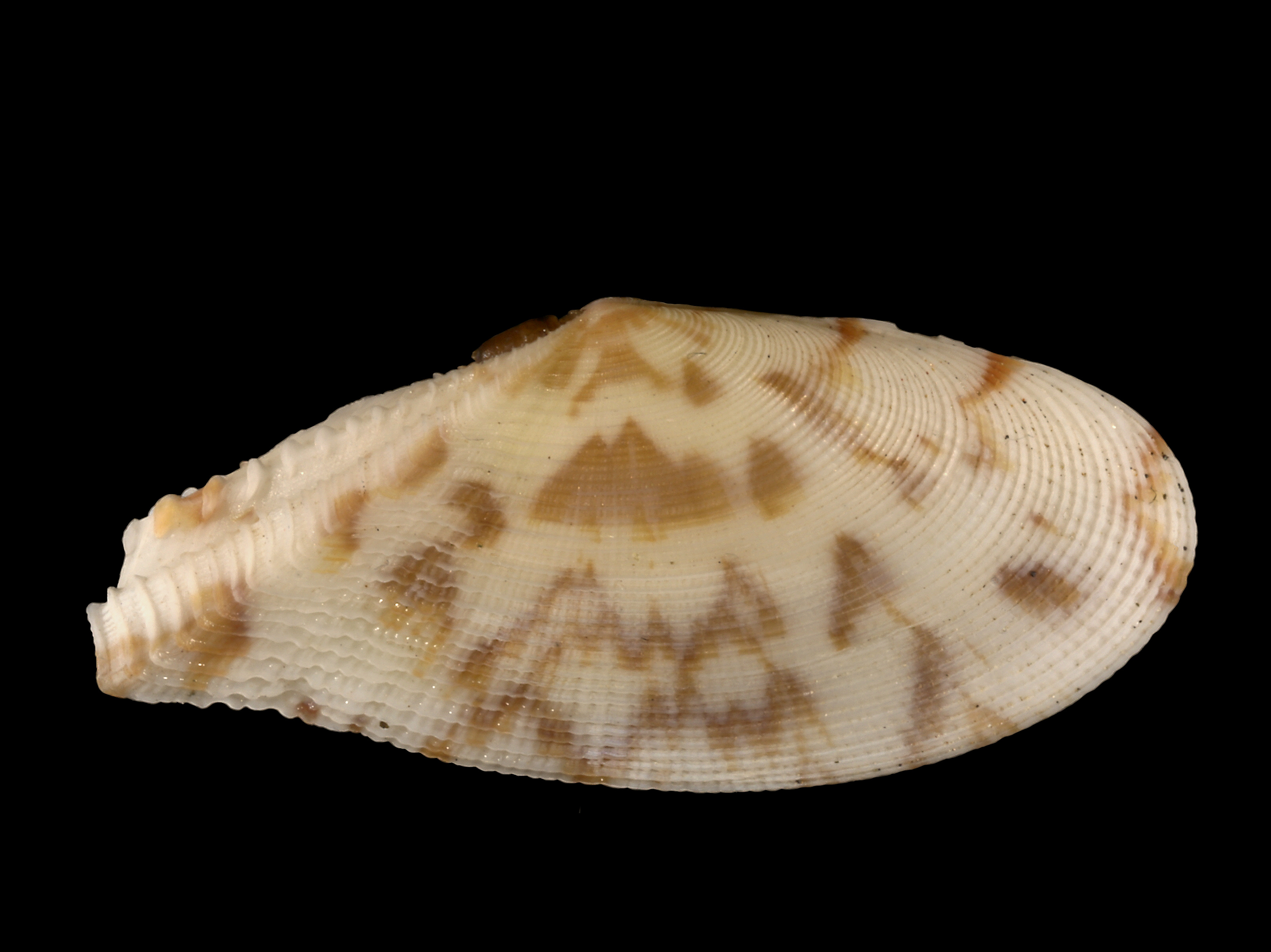
- The right valve of a shell of Tellinella listeri, anterior end towards the right

Scientific classification
- Kingdom: Animalia
- Phylum: Mollusca
- Class: Bivalvia
- Order: Cardiida
- Superfamily: Tellinoidea
- Family: Tellinidae
- Genus: Tellinella
- Species: T. listeri

Binomial name
- Tellinella listeri (Röding, 1798)

Synonyms
- Tellina (Tellinella) listeri Röding, 1798; Tellina interrupta Wood, 1815; Tellina interrupta [Lightfoot], 1786 nomen nudum; Tellina listeri Röding, 1798 ·; Tellina maculosa Lamarck, 1818

= Tellinella listeri =

Species of bivalve

Tellinella listeri, the speckled tellin, is a bivalve mollusc in the family Tellinidae, the tellins.

== Distribution ==
St. Vincent, Barbados and other Eastern Caribbean islands in sandy areas at 5–15 metres depth, and as far North as the Florida Keys.
