= Cadella =

Scientific classification
- Kingdom: Animalia
- Phylum: Mollusca
- Class: Bivalvia
- Order: Cardiida
- Family: Tellinidae
- Genus: Cadella; Dall, Bartsch & Rehder, 1938

Genus of bivalves

Cadella is a genus of bivalves belonging to the family Tellinidae.

The genus has almost cosmopolitan distribution.

== Species ==
Species:

- Cadella coltroi M.Huber, Langleit & Kreipl, 2015
- Cadella crebrimaculata (Sowerby II, 1868)
- Cadella delta (Yokoyama, 1922)
