= Hanleyanus =

Scientific classification
- Domain: Eukaryota
- Kingdom: Animalia
- Phylum: Mollusca
- Class: Bivalvia
- Order: Cardiida
- Family: Tellinidae
- Genus: Hanleyanus; Huber, Langleit & Kreipl, 2015

Genus of bivalves

Hanleyanus is a genus of bivalves belonging to the family Tellinidae.

The species of this genus are found in Southeastern Asia and Australia.

Species:

- Hanleyanus amboynensis (Deshayes, 1855)
- Hanleyanus immaculatus (Philippi, 1849)
- Hanleyanus oblongus (Gmelin, 1791)
- Hanleyanus truncatulus (G.B.Sowerby I, 1825)
- Hanleyanus vestalioides (Yokoyama, 1920)
- Hanleyanus vestalis (Hanley, 1844)
