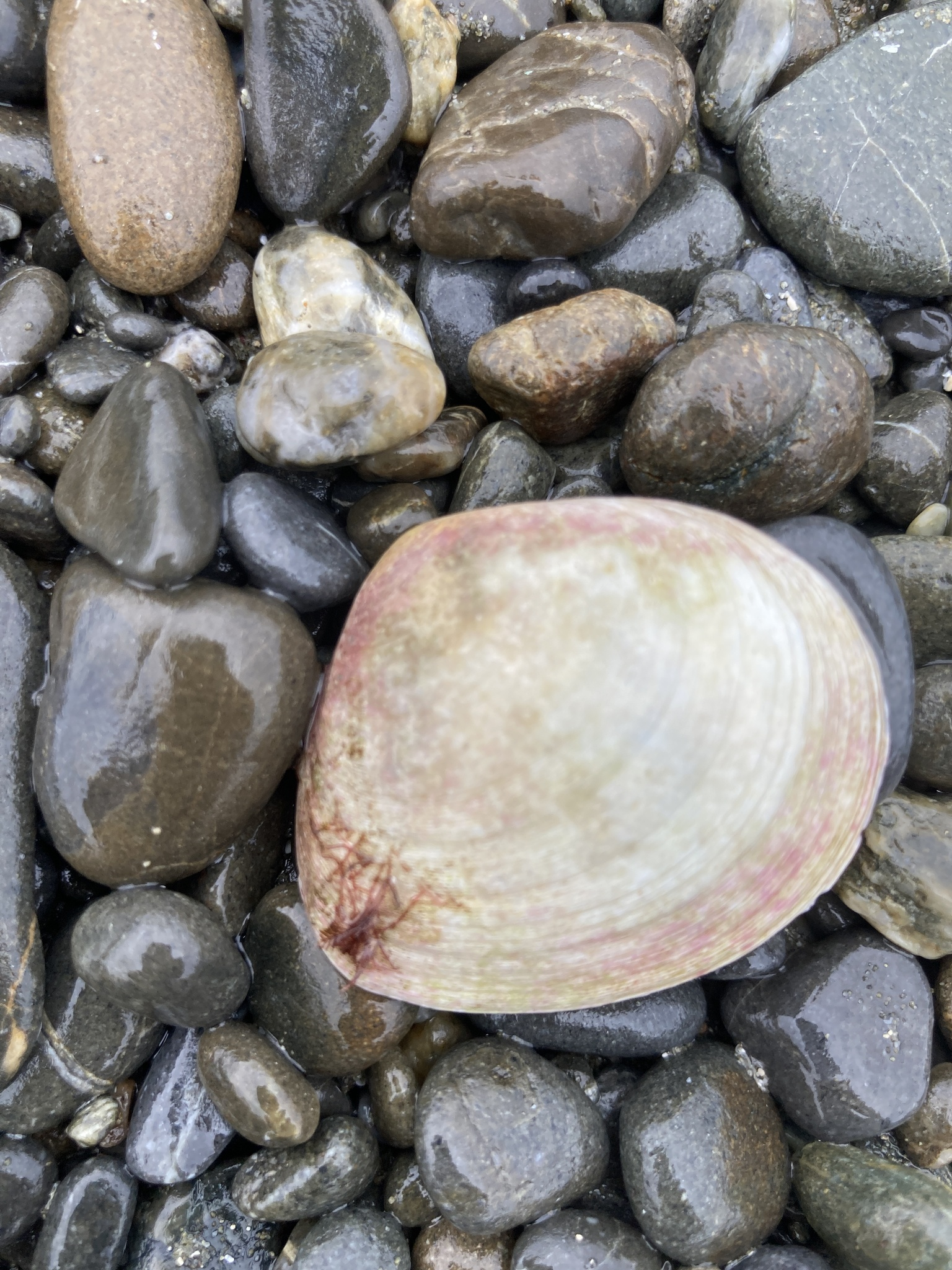

Scientific classification
- Kingdom: Animalia
- Phylum: Mollusca
- Class: Bivalvia
- Order: Cardiida
- Family: Tellinidae
- Subfamily: Arcopagiinae
- Genus: Pseudarcopagia; Bertin, 1878

= Pseudarcopagia =

Genus of molluscs

Pseudarcopagia is a genus of bivalves that exist in Australia and New Zealand.

== Description ==
These are small surf clams.

== Taxonomy ==
Pseudarcopagia contains the following species:

- Pseudarcopagia victoriae
- Pseudarcopagia ponsonbyi
- Pseudarcopagia botanica
- Pseudarcopagia disculus
- Pseudarcopagia decora
