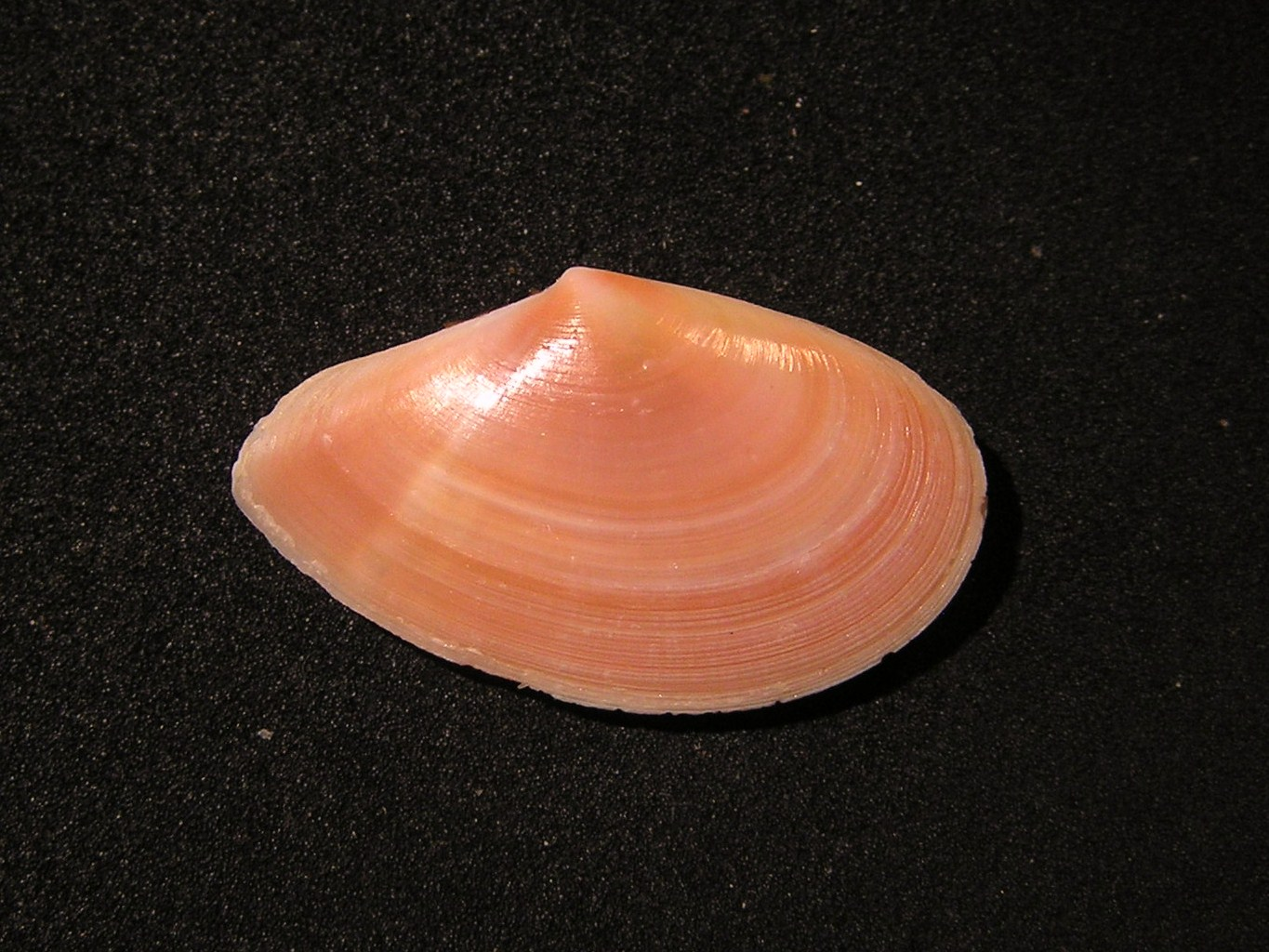
- Bosemprella incarnata

Scientific classification
- Domain: Eukaryota
- Kingdom: Animalia
- Phylum: Mollusca
- Class: Bivalvia
- Order: Cardiida
- Family: Tellinidae
- Genus: Bosemprella; Huber, Langleit & Kreipl, 2015

= Bosemprella =

Genus of bivalves

Bosemprella is a genus of bivalves belonging to the family Tellinidae.

The species of this genus are found in Western Europe and Mediterranean.

Species:

- Bosemprella aquitanica (Mayer, 1864)
- Bosemprella incarnata (Linnaeus, 1758)
