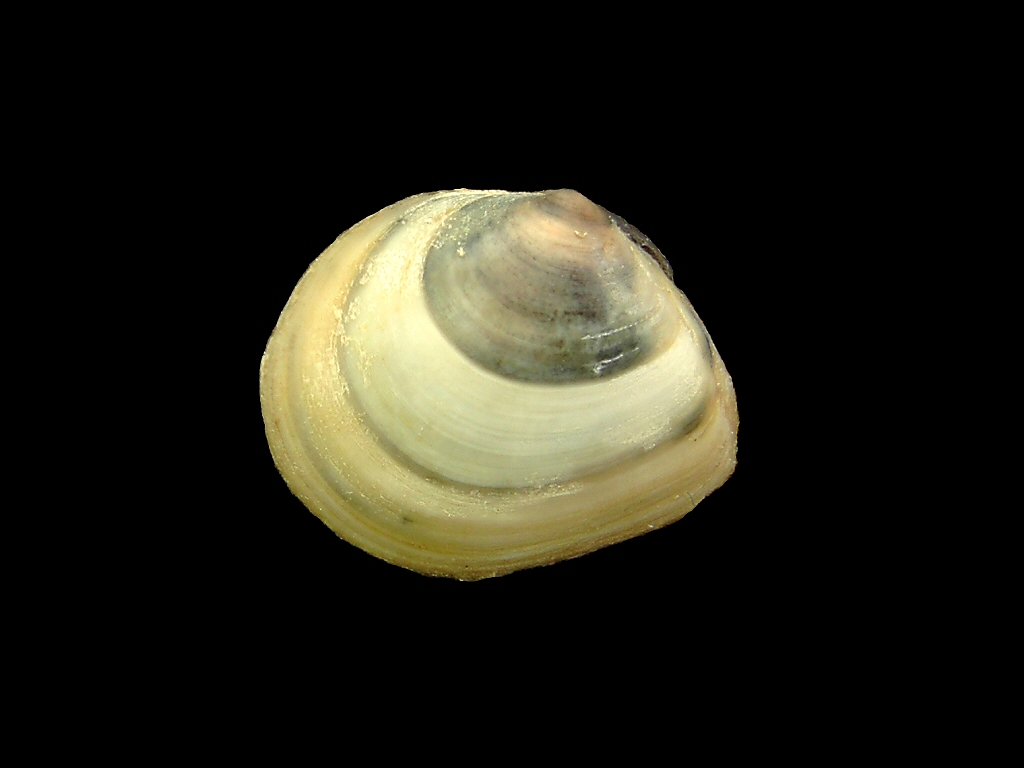

Conservation status
- Secure (NatureServe)

Scientific classification
- Kingdom: Animalia
- Phylum: Mollusca
- Class: Bivalvia
- Order: Cardiida
- Family: Tellinidae
- Genus: Limecola
- Species: L. balthica

Binomial name
- Limecola balthica (Linnaeus, 1758)

Synonyms
- Macoma balthica (Linnaeus, 1758)

= Limecola balthica =

Species of bivalve

Limecola balthica, commonly called the Baltic macoma, Baltic clam or Baltic tellin, is a small saltwater clam, a marine bivalve mollusk in the family Tellinidae (the macomas and tellins).

== Appearance ==
The shells are smooth, relatively flat, oval or somewhat trigonal in shape, and less than 30 mm (1.2 in) long. The shell color is polymorphic, varying between individuals and between localities. Often most specimens are white, sometimes most are pink, and also yellow and orange shells may occur. Color is best visible in worn-out dead shells and inside the shell. Concentric growth rings indicating the age of the specimen are often clearly visible.

Macoma balthica var. nivea
Right and left valve of the same specimen:

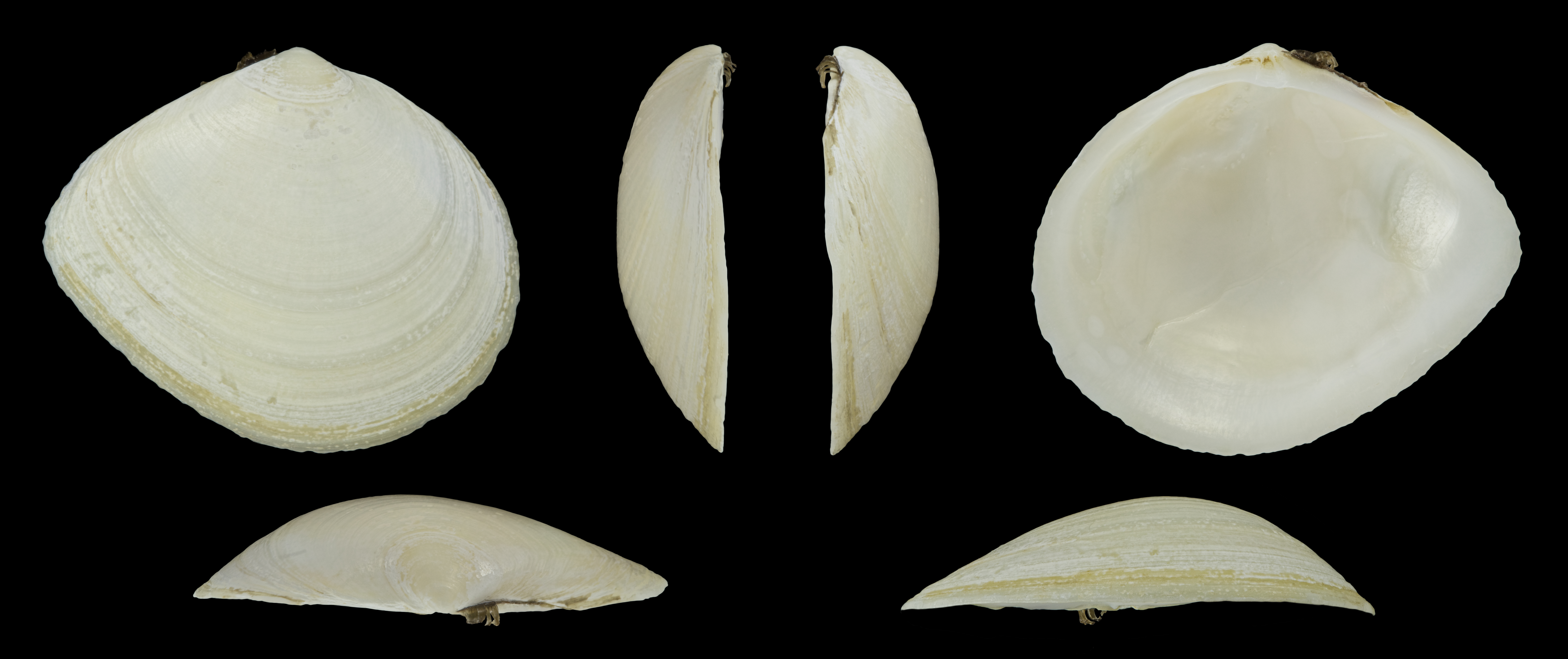
Right valve

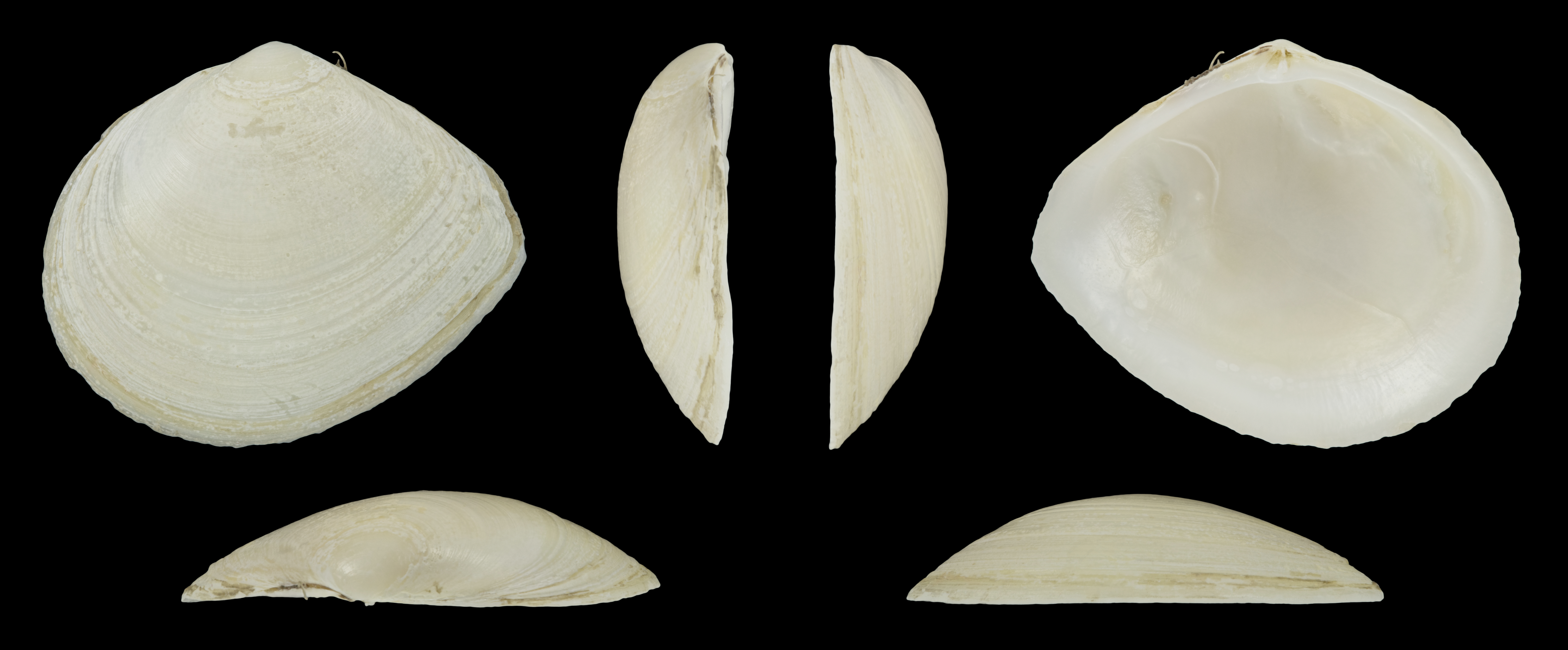
Left valve

== Ecology and habitat ==
Limecola balthica is an infaunal bivalve, living buried in the mud or silt, and extending its two narrow siphons to the bottom surface. Through the siphons, it feeds on organic matter on the sediment surface or in the water.

Limecola balthica is a euryhaline species, capable of living in a wide range of water salinity, down to 3-4 permille, i.e. 10% of ocean salinity. It usually lives in the intertidal or shallow subtidal, and is common in estuaries and bays. In the brackish Baltic Sea it lives submerged down to water depths over 100m.

== Distribution ==
Limecola balthica lives in the northern parts of both the Atlantic and Pacific oceans, and also extends to the Subarctic both in North America and in Europe. The European distribution ranges from southern France north to the White Sea and Pechora Sea, and also includes the inner brackish parts of the Baltic Sea. In eastern North America, L. balthica is distributed from the Gulf of St. Lawrence Bay north to Hudson Bay, in the Pacific from Washington to the Beaufort Sea in Alaska, and also on the Russian coast. Along the U.S. Atlantic and Pacific coasts (Oregon to south), M. balthica is replaced by a similar species Limecola petalum.
