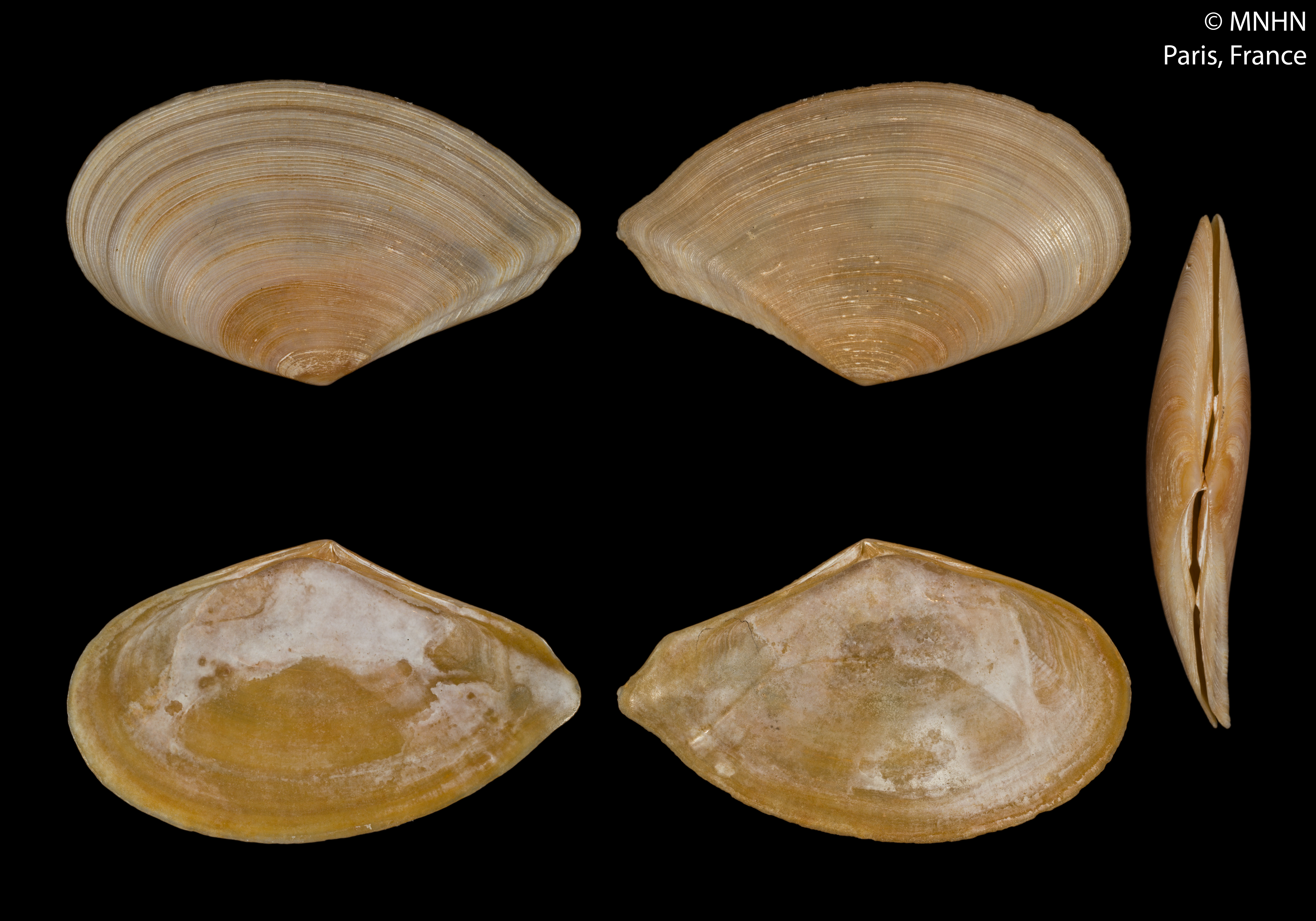
- Shell of Serratina owenii (syntype at MNHN, Paris)

Scientific classification
- Kingdom: Animalia
- Phylum: Mollusca
- Class: Bivalvia
- Order: Cardiida
- Superfamily: Tellinoidea
- Family: Tellinidae
- Genus: Serratina; Pallary, 1920

Type species
- Tellina serrata Brocchi, 1814

Synonyms
- Maoritellina Finlay, 1926; Pistris Thiele, 1934; Pristis Jousseaume in Lamy, 1918 (Invalid: junior homonym of...); Quadrans (Striotellina) Thiele, 1934 (objective synonym); Tellina (Pistris) Thiele, 1934; Tellina (Serratina) Pallary, 1920 · alternate representation

= Serratina (bivalve) =

Genus of bivalves

Serratina is a genus of marine bivalve molluscs, in the subfamily Tellininae of the family Tellinidae.

== Nomenclature ==
Originally introduced as a section of Tellina (Eurytellina).

== Species ==
- Serratina aequistriata Say, 1824
- Serratina alerta Boss, 1964
- Serratina belcheriana (G. B. Sowerby II, 1867)
- Serratina brevirostris Deshayes, 1855
- Serratina capsoides (Lamarck, 1818)
- Serratina charlottae E.A. Smith, 1885
- Serratina diaphana (Deshayes, 1855)
- †Serratina ferrari (Marwick, 1931)
- Serratina fimbriata (Hanley, 1844)
- Serratina fissa (Spengler, 1798)
- Serratina jonasi (Philippi, 1847)
- Serratina martinicensis D'Orbigny, 1842
- Serratina monomera (Habe, 1961)
- Serratina ostracea (Lamarck, 1818)
- Serratina owenii (Hanley, 1845)
- Serratina perplexa (Hanley, 1844)
- Serratina pristis (Lamarck, 1818)
- Serratina reclusa (Dall, 1900)
- Serratina resecta (Deshayes, 1855)
- Serratina serrata Brocchi, 1814
- Serratina siamensis (Martens, 1860)
- Serratina steinbecki Coan & Valentich-Scott, 2010

Synonyms

- Serratina eugonia (Suter, 1913): synonym of Serratina charlottae (E. A. Smith, 1885)
- Serratina margaritina (Lamarck, 1818): synonym of Tellinides margaritinus (Lamarck, 1818)
- Serratina subtruncata (Hanley, 1844): synonym of Pristipagia subtruncata (Hanley, 1844)
- Serratina sulcata (Wood, 1815): synonym of Serratina fissa (Spengler, 1798)
- Serratina tokunagai (Ikebe, 1936): synonym of Ardeamya tokunagai (Ikebe, 1936)
