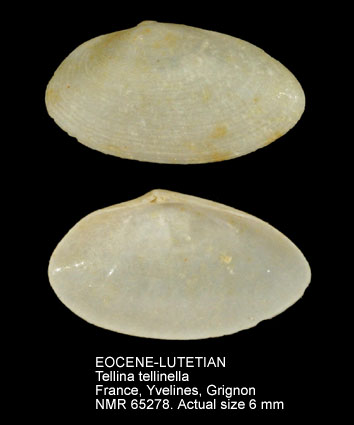
- Elliptotellina tellinella

Scientific classification
- Kingdom: Animalia
- Phylum: Mollusca
- Class: Bivalvia
- Order: Cardiida
- Family: Tellinidae
- Subfamily: Tellininae
- Genus: Elliptotellina; Cossmann, 1886

Type species
- † Donax tellinella Lamarck, 1805

Synonyms
- Ascitellina Marwick, 1928; Tellina (Elliptotellina) Cossmann, 1886

= Elliptotellina =

Elliptotellina Temporal range: Lower Paleocene–present

Genus of bivalves

Elliptotellina is a genus of bivalve molluscs in the family Tellinidae. First appearing in the fossil record at the end of the Lower Paleocene, the genus has two known living members, E. urinatoria from New Zealand, and E. kikaizimana from the western Pacific Ocean and the Andaman Sea.

== Description ==
The genus is more oval and elongated relative to members of the genus Tellina.

== Taxonomy ==
Elliptotellina was first described as a "section" (i.e. subgenus) of Tellina in 1886 by Maurice Cossmann, who named Donax tellinella (now Elliptotellina tellinella) as the type species for the genus. Elliptotellina has since been raised to genus level.

== Distribution ==
Currently there are two known extant species: E. kikaizimana, which is found in the Andaman Sea, New Caledonia and the islands of southern Japan (including the Amami Islands, Izu Islands, Ryukyu Islands and Bonin Islands), and E. urinatoria, which is found off the coast of New Zealand at a depth of 27–36.5 m (89–120 ft), around the mainland, Stewart Island, Campbell Islands, Bounty Islands and the Chatham Islands.

The earliest known fossils in the genus are of E. donaciformis, which date to the Waipawan stage of New Zealand, from the Lower Palaeocene / early Eocene border, as well as fossils from Togo and Nigeria. Fossils in the genus have been found in England, France, New Zealand, and the west coast of the United States dating to the Eocene. Fossils dating to the Oligocene have been found in California, as well as Miocene fossils in New Zealand, Pliocene fossils from Jamaica, and Quaternary fossils in Ecuador and New Zealand.

== Species ==
Species within the genus Elliptotellina include:

- † Elliptotellina ambigua (J. De C. Sowerby, 1823)
- † Elliptotellina donaciformis (Marwick, 1928)
- Elliptotellina kikaizimana (Nomura & Zinbo, 1934)
- † Elliptotellina protensa (A. W. B. Powell, 1935)
- † Elliptotellina tellinella (Lamarck, 1805)
- † Elliptotellina transversa (Deshayes, 1857)
- Elliptotellina urinatoria (Suter, 1911)

== Gallery ==
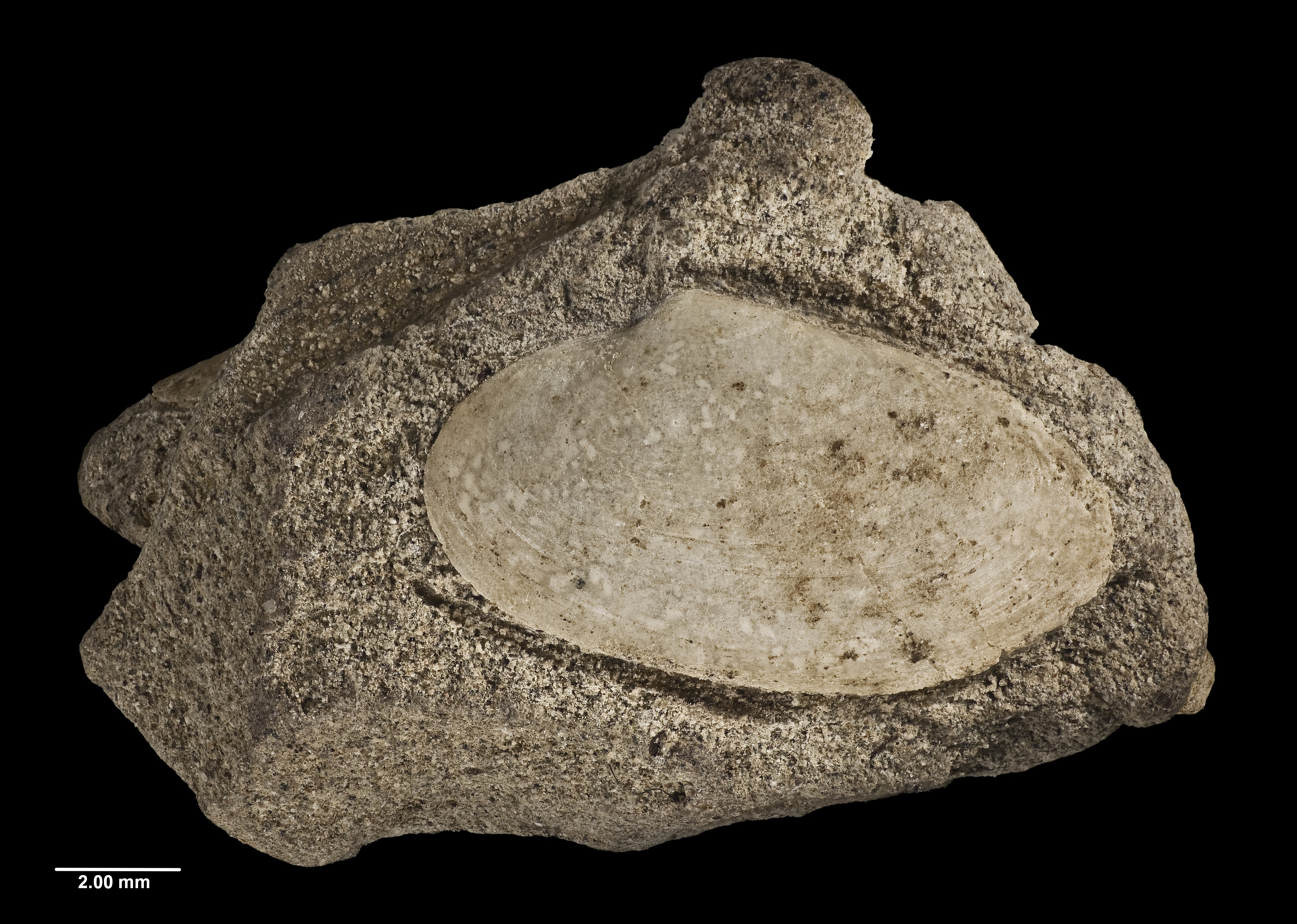
E. protensa

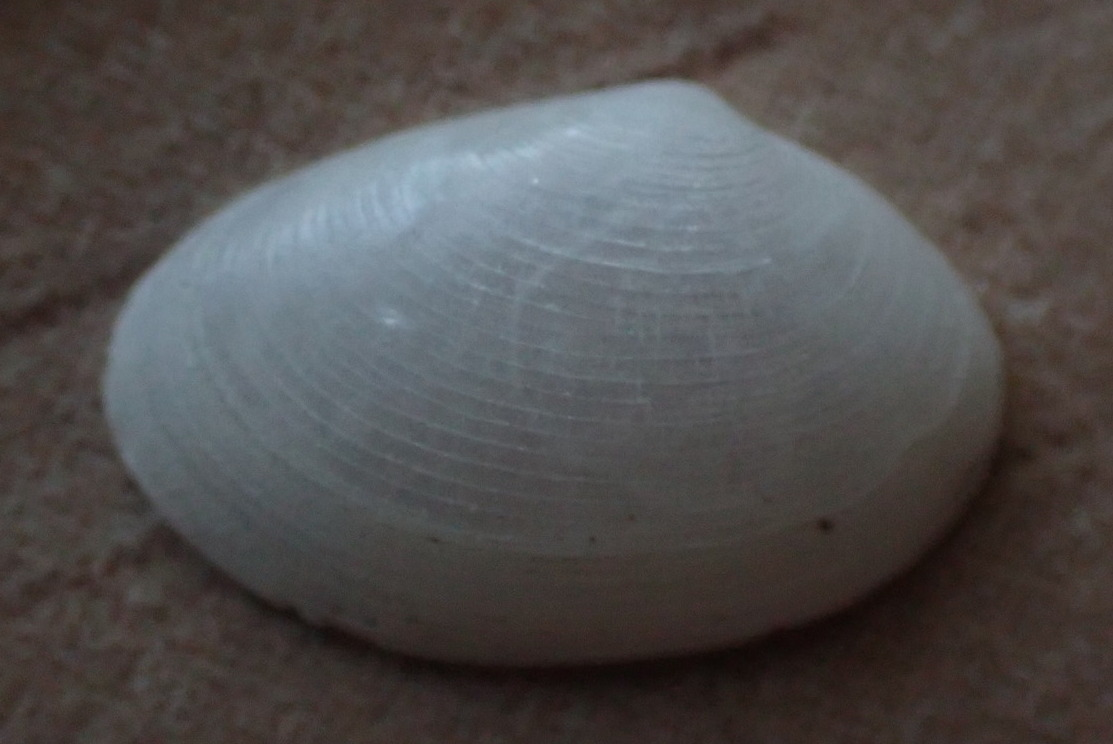
Recent shell of E. urinatoria
