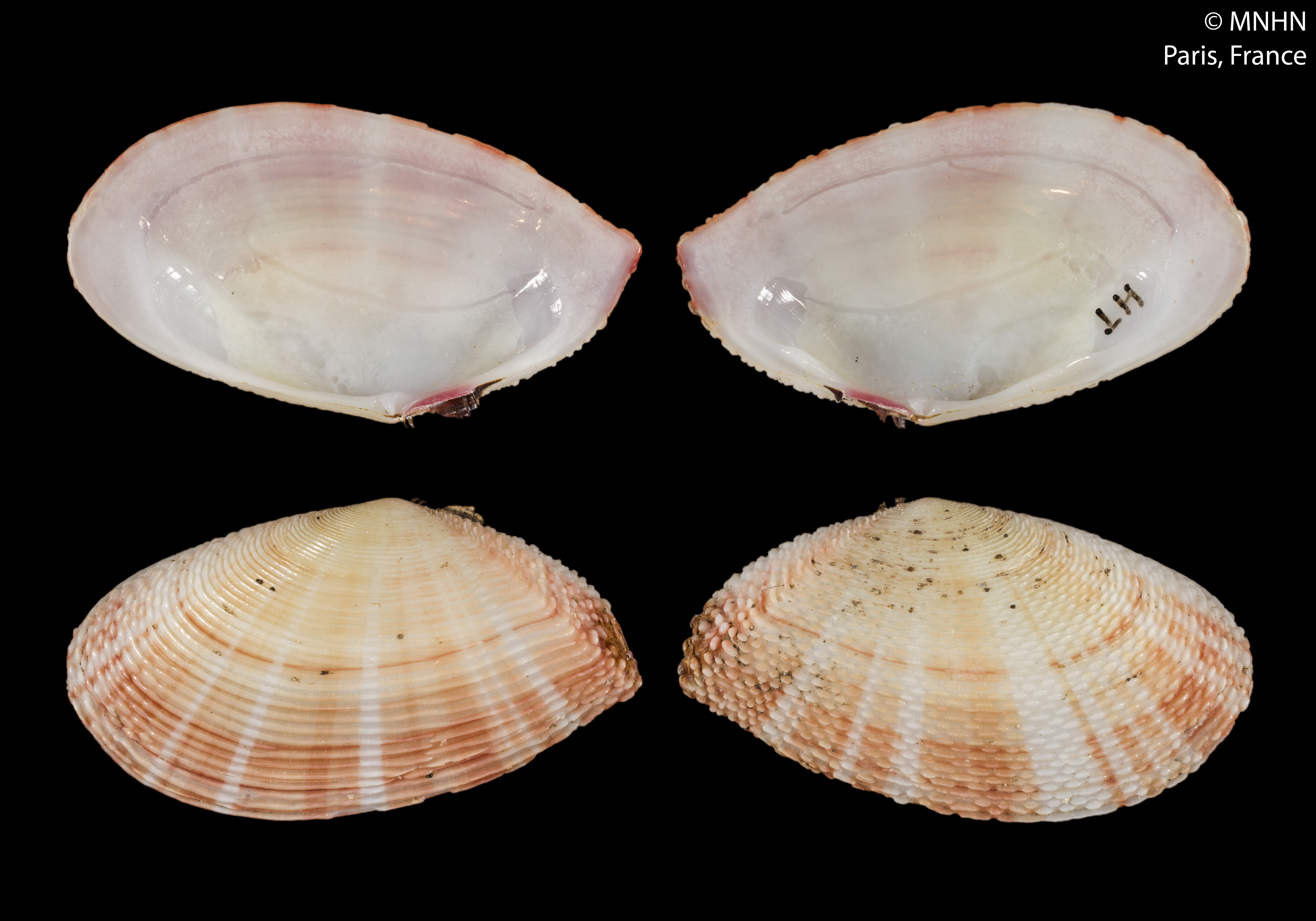
- Shell of Scutarcopagia monika (holotype at MNHN, Paris)

Scientific classification
- Kingdom: Animalia
- Phylum: Mollusca
- Class: Bivalvia
- Order: Cardiida
- Superfamily: Tellinoidea
- Family: Tellinidae
- Genus: Scutarcopagia; Pilsbry, 1918

Type species
- Tellina scobinata Linnaeus, 1758

Synonyms
- Arcopagia (Smitharcopagia) Afshar, 1969; Cyclotellina (Scutarcopagia) Pilsbry, 1918; Smitharcopagia Afshar, 1969; Smithsonella Afshar, 1969; Tellina (Scutarcopagia) Pilsbry, 1918 (original rank)

= Scutarcopagia =

Genus of bivalves

Scutarcopagia is a genus of bivalves belonging to the subfamily Tellininae of the family Tellinidae.

== Species ==
- Scutarcopagia delicatula (Selli, 1974)
- Scutarcopagia linguafelis (Linnaeus, 1758)
- Scutarcopagia monika M. Huber, Langleit & Kreipl, 2015
- Scutarcopagia nelly M. Huber, Langleit & Kreipl, 2015
- Scutarcopagia pulcherrima (G. B. Sowerby I, 1825)
- Scutarcopagia scobinata (Linnaeus, 1758)
- Scutarcopagia semiaspera (Deshayes, 1855)
- Scutarcopagia squamulosa (A. Adams, 1850)
- Scutarcopagia verrucosa (Hanley, 1844)

Synonyms

- Scutarcopagia lingaefelis [sic]: synonym of Scutarcopagia linguafelis (Linnaeus, 1758) (misspelling)
