= Pharaonella =

Scientific classification
- Domain: Eukaryota
- Kingdom: Animalia
- Phylum: Mollusca
- Class: Bivalvia
- Order: Cardiida
- Family: Tellinidae
- Genus: Pharaonella; Lamy, 1918

Genus of bivalves

Pharaonella is a genus of bivalves belonging to the family Tellinidae.

The species of this genus are found in Southern Hemisphere.

Species:

- Pharaonella amanyu Kato & Ohsuga, 2017
- Pharaonella astula (Hedley, 1917)
- Pharaonella aurea (Perry, 1811)
- Pharaonella cuspis (Hanley, 1844)
- Pharaonella dialeuca (Deshayes, 1855)
- Pharaonella miles (Hanley, 1844)
- Pharaonella pharaonis (Hanley, 1844)
- Pharaonella semilaevis (Martens, 1865)
- Pharaonella sieboldii (Deshayes, 1855)
- Pharaonella venusta (Deshayes, 1855)
- Pharaonella wallaceae (Salisbury, 1934)
