= Austromacoma constricta =

Conservation status
- Secure (NatureServe)

Scientific classification
- Kingdom: Animalia
- Phylum: Mollusca
- Class: Bivalvia
- Order: Cardiida
- Family: Tellinidae
- Genus: Austromacoma
- Species: A. constricta

Binomial name
- Austromacoma constricta (Bruguière, 1792)

Synonyms
- Solen constrictus Bruguière, 1792; Psammobia cayenensis Lamarck, 1818; Tellina lateralis Say, 1827; Tellina suensoni Deshayes, 1855; Tellina constricta (Bruguière, 1792); Tellina (Macoma) constricta (Bruguière, 1792); Macoma constricta (Bruguière, 1792)

Species of bivalve

Austromacoma constricta is a species of bivalve belonging to the family Tellinidae.

The species is found in both North and South America.
