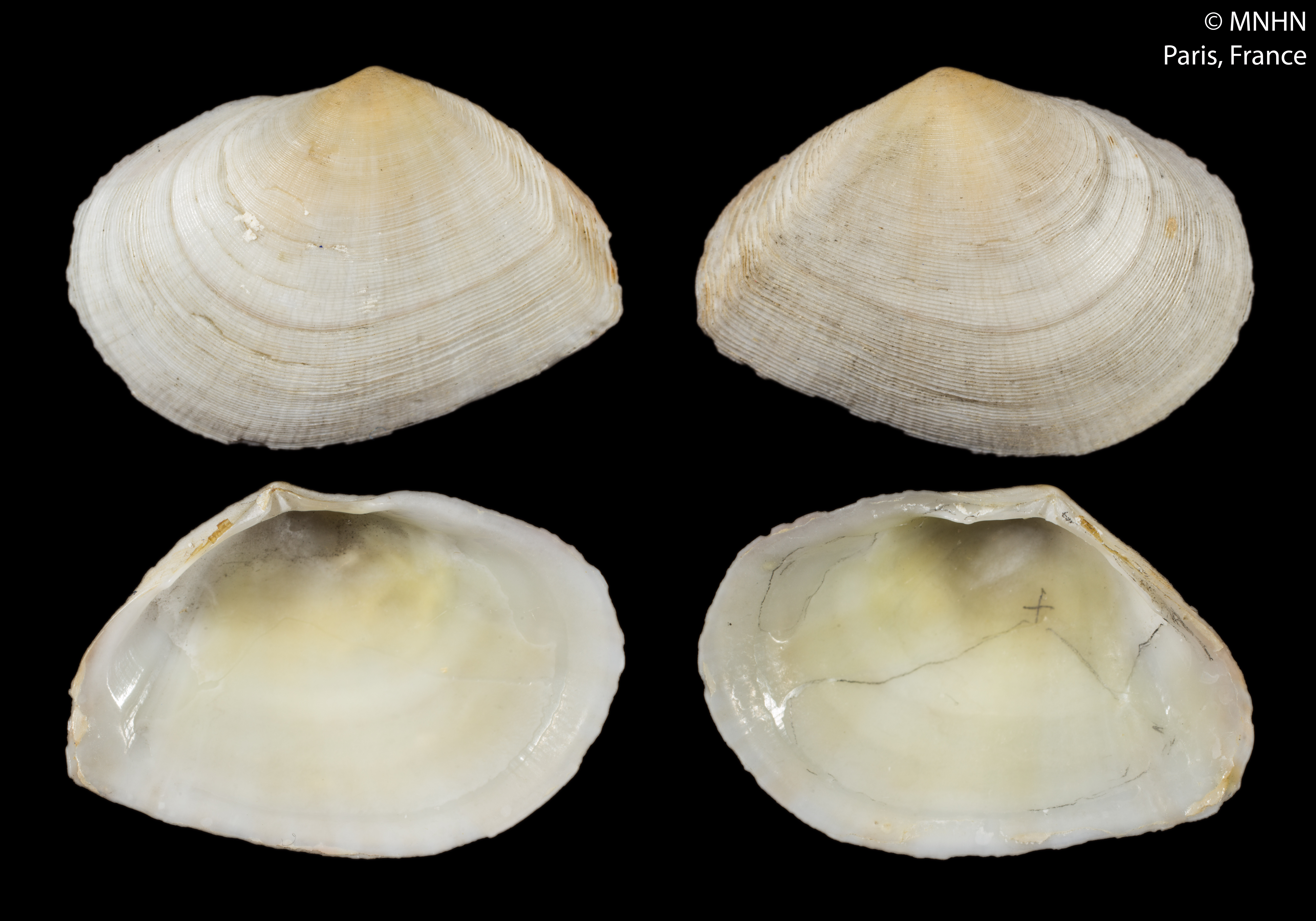
- Shell of Pristipagia bertini (syntype at MNHN, Paris)

Scientific classification
- Domain: Eukaryota
- Kingdom: Animalia
- Phylum: Mollusca
- Class: Bivalvia
- Order: Cardiida
- Superfamily: Tellinoidea
- Family: Tellinidae
- Genus: Pristipagia; Iredale, 1936

Type species
- Pristipagia gemonia Iredale, 1936

= Pristipagia =

Genus of bivalves

Pristipagia is a genus of bivalves belonging to the subfamily Tellininae of the family Tellinidae.

== Species ==
- Pristipagia adamsii (Bertin, 1878)
- Pristipagia bertini M. Huber, Langleit & Kreipl, 2015
- Pristipagia elaborata (G. B. Sowerby III, 1917)
- Pristipagia gemonia Iredale, 1936
- Pristipagia kolabana (Melvill, 1893)
- Pristipagia ojiensis (Tokunaga, 1906)
- Pristipagia radians (Deshayes, 1855)
- Pristipagia subtruncata (Hanley, 1844)
