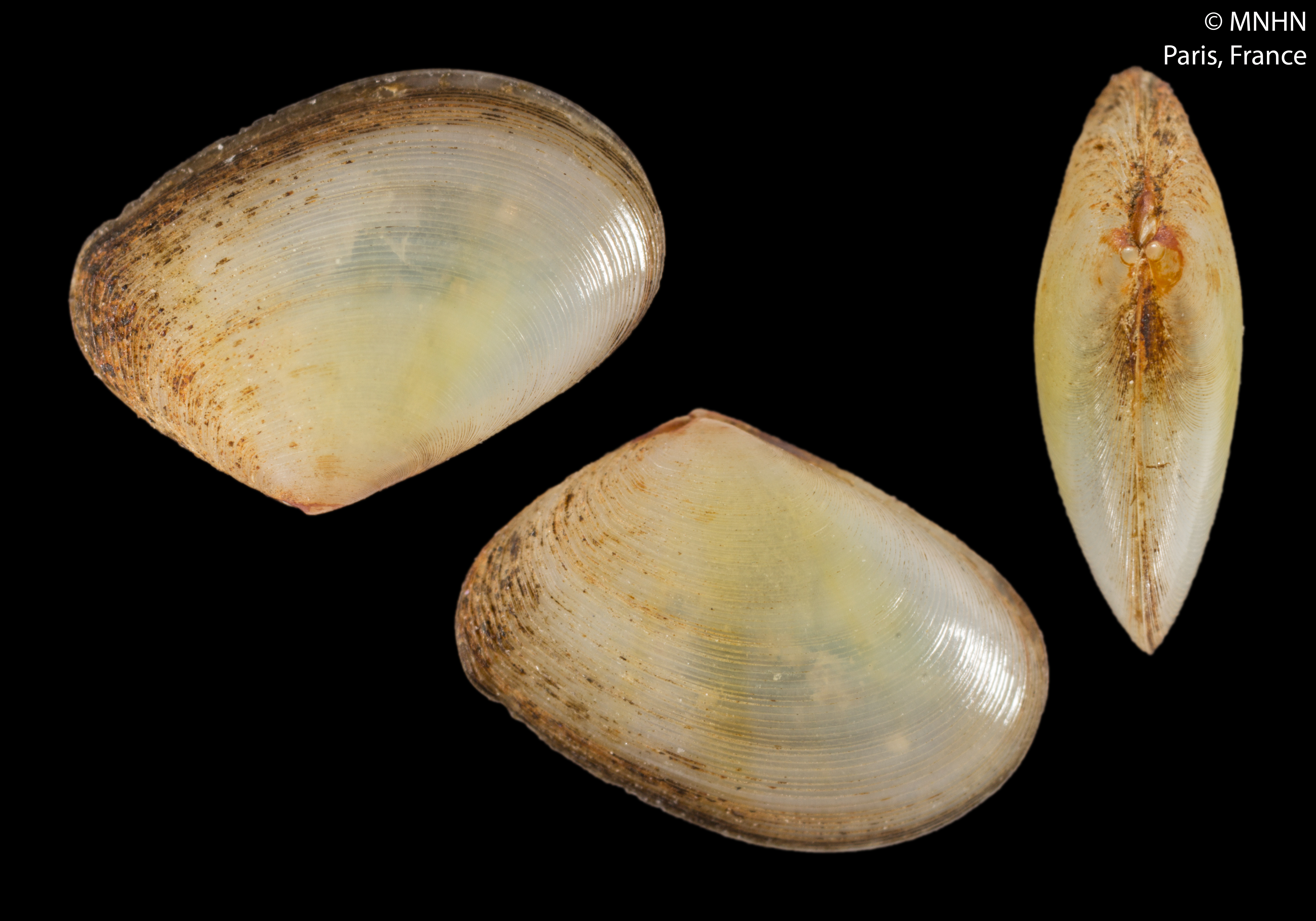
- Shell of Semelangulus boucheti (holotype at MNHN, Paris)

Scientific classification
- Kingdom: Animalia
- Phylum: Mollusca
- Class: Bivalvia
- Order: Cardiida
- Superfamily: Tellinoidea
- Family: Tellinidae
- Genus: Semelangulus; Iredale, 1924

Type species
- Tellina tenuilirata G. B. Sowerby II, 1867

Synonyms
- Tellina (Semelangulus) Iredale, 1924

= Semelangulus =

Genus of bivalves

Semelangulus is a genus of bivalves belonging to the subfamily Moerellinae of the family Tellinidae.

== Species ==
- Semelangulus boucheti M. Huber, Langleit & Kreipl, 2015
- Semelangulus brazieri (G. B. Sowerby II, 1869)
- Semelangulus ellicensis (Hedley, 1899)
- Semelangulus fijiensis (G. B. Sowerby II, 1868)
- Semelangulus lacrimadugongi Kato & Ohsuga, 2007
- Semelangulus liratus M. Huber, Langleit & Kreipl, 2015
- Semelangulus mesodesmoides P. G. Oliver & Zuschin, 2000
- Semelangulus miyatensis (Yokoyama, 1920)
- Semelangulus nebulosus Dall, Bartsch & Rehder, 1938
- Semelangulus parvulus (Bertin, 1878)
- Semelangulus rosamunda (Melvill & Standen, 1907)
- Semelangulus tenuiliratus (G. B. Sowerby II, 1867)
- Semelangulus tokubeii Habe, 1961
- Semelangulus vincentianus (Tate, 1891)

Synonyms

- Semelangulus adamsi M. Huber, Langleit & Kreipl, 2015: synonym of Jactellina adamsi (M. Huber, Langleit & Kreipl, 2015) (original combination)
- Semelangulus crebrimaculatus (G. B. Sowerby II, 1868): synonym of Cadella crebrimaculata (G. B. Sowerby II, 1868)
- Semelangulus dichrous Dall, Bartsch & Rehder, 1938: synonym of Semelangulus fijiensis (G. B. Sowerby II, 1868)
- Semelangulus diodorus Dall, Bartsch & Rehder, 1938: synonym of Semelangulus fijiensis (G. B. Sowerby II, 1868)
- Semelangulus lilium (Hanley, 1844): synonym of Sylvanus lilium (Hanley, 1844)
- Semelangulus oahusensis Dall, Bartsch & Rehder, 1938: synonym of Semelangulus fijiensis (G. B. Sowerby II, 1868)
- Semelangulus semitorta (G. B. Sowerby II, 1867): synonym of Semelangulus tenuiliratus (G. B. Sowerby II, 1867)
- Semelangulus unifasciatus (G.B. Sowerby II, 1867): synonym of Nitidotellina unifasciata (G. B. Sowerby II, 1867)
