= Jactellina =

Scientific classification
- Domain: Eukaryota
- Kingdom: Animalia
- Phylum: Mollusca
- Class: Bivalvia
- Order: Cardiida
- Family: Tellinidae
- Genus: Jactellina; Iredale, 1929

Type species
- Tellina obliquaria Deshayes, 1855

Genus of bivalves

Jactellina is a genus of bivalves, belonging to the family Tellinidae, first described by conchologist Tom Iredale in 1929.

This genus occurs widely in the western Pacific Ocean.

The following species are recognized:

- Jactellina adamsi (M. Huber, Langleit & Kreipl, 2015)
- Jactellina clathrata (Deshayes, 1835)
- Jactellina formosa (Hanley, 1844)
- Jactellina obliquaria (Deshayes, 1855)
- Jactellina obliquistriata (G. B. Sowerby II, 1868)
- Jactellina secunda (Bertin, 1878)
- Jactellina subpallida (E. A. Smith, 1891)
- Jactellina texturata (G. B. Sowerby II, 1867)
- Jactellina transcalpta (G. B. Sowerby III, 1915)
