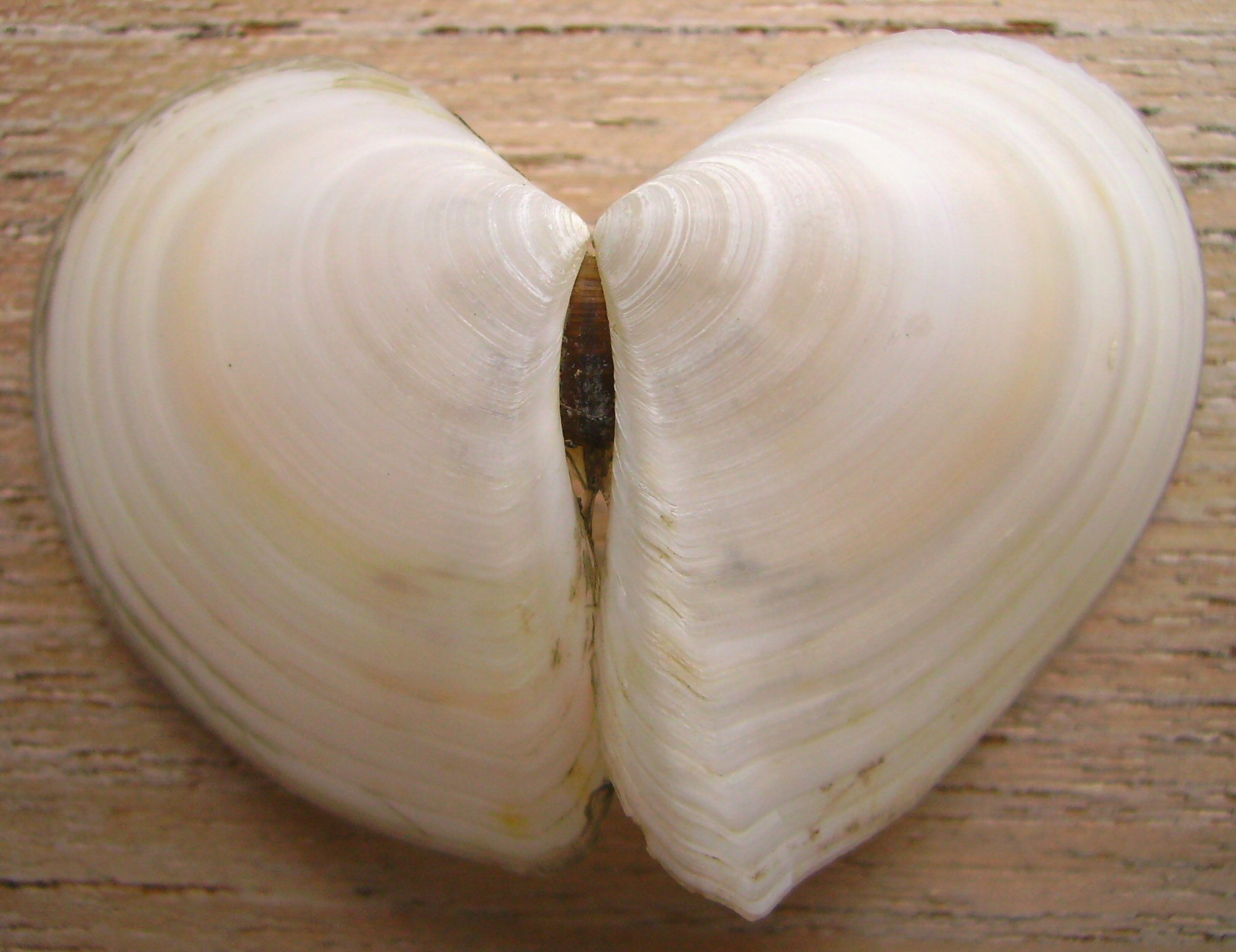
- Macomona liliana

Scientific classification
- Kingdom: Animalia
- Phylum: Mollusca
- Class: Bivalvia
- Order: Cardiida
- Superfamily: Tellinoidea
- Family: Tellinidae
- Genus: Macomona; Blainville, 1814

Species
- See text.

= Macomona =

Genus of bivalves

Macomona is a genus of marine bivalve molluscs, in the family Tellinidae.

== Species ==
- Macomona australis (Deshayes, 1855)
- Macomona deltoidalis (Lamarck, 1818)
- Macomona imbellis (Hanley, 1844)
- Macomona liliana (Iredale, 1915)
