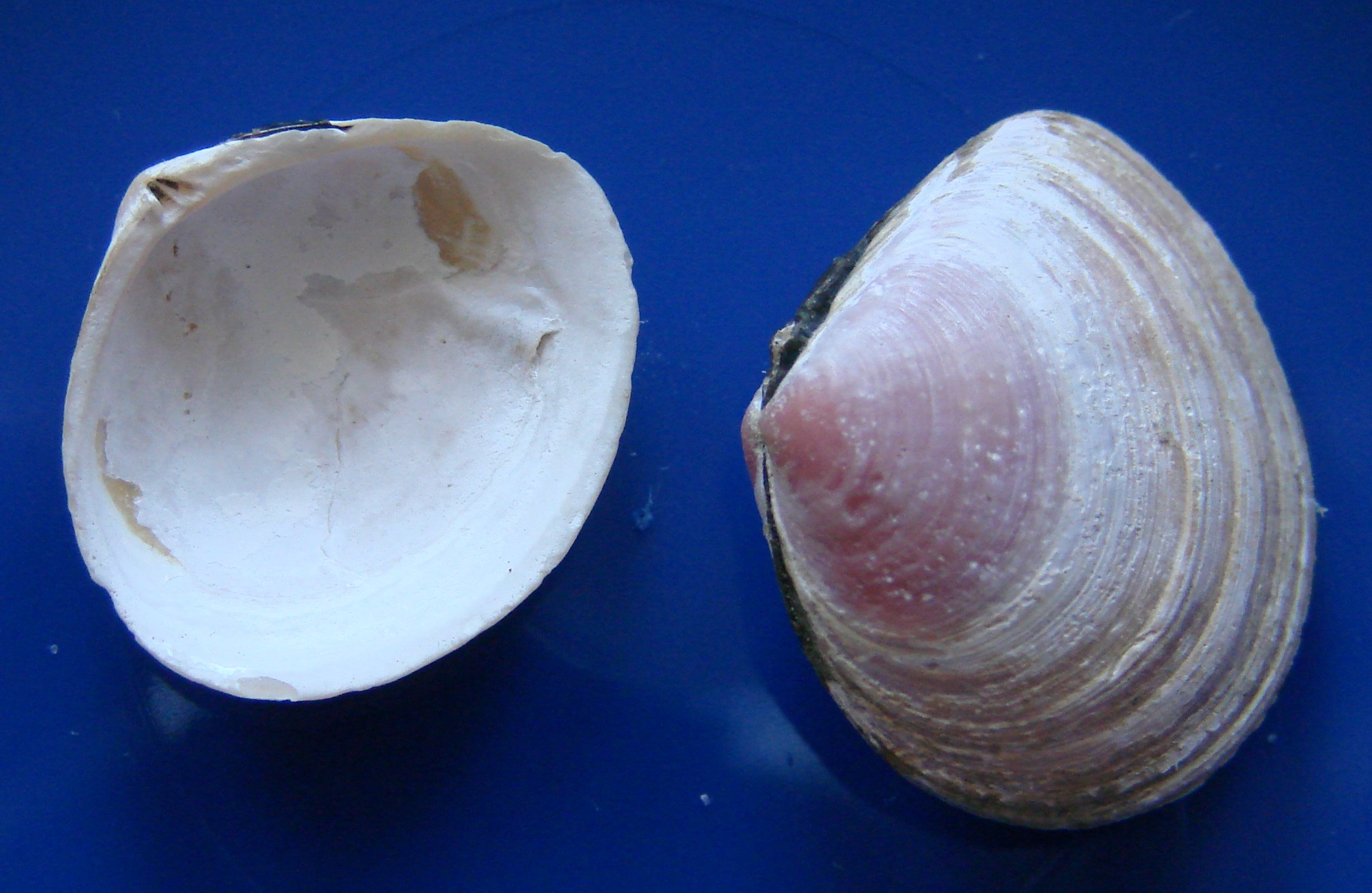
- Limecola balthica

Scientific classification
- Domain: Eukaryota
- Kingdom: Animalia
- Phylum: Mollusca
- Class: Bivalvia
- Order: Cardiida
- Superfamily: Tellinoidea
- Family: Tellinidae
- Genus: Limecola; T. Brown, 1844

Species
- See text

= Limecola =

Genus of molluscs

Limecola is a genus of saltwater clams, marine bivalve molluscs in the family Tellinidae, the tellins.

== Species ==
According to the World Register of Marine Species (WoRMS), the following species are included as accepted names within the genus Limecola:

- Limecola balthica (Linnaeus, 1758)
- Limecola contabulata (Deshayes, 1855)
- Limecola petalum (Valenciennes, 1827)
