= Austromacoma =

Scientific classification
- Domain: Eukaryota
- Kingdom: Animalia
- Phylum: Mollusca
- Class: Bivalvia
- Order: Cardiida
- Family: Tellinidae
- Genus: Austromacoma; Olsson, 1961

Genus of bivalves

Austromacoma is a genus of bivalves belonging to the family Tellinidae.

The species of this genus are found in America, Western Africa and Malesia.

Species:

- Austromacoma biota (Arruda & Domaneschi, 2005)
- Austromacoma birmanica (Philippi, 1849)
- Austromacoma constricta (Bruguière, 1792)
- Austromacoma laevigata (Lamarck, 1818)
- Austromacoma lucerna (Hanley, 1844)
- Austromacoma nymphalis (Lamarck, 1818)
