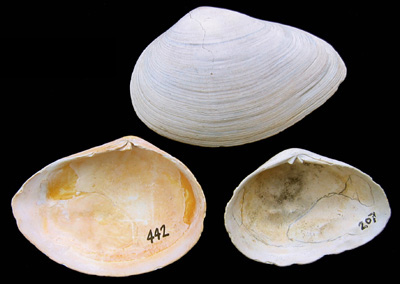
- Gastrana fragilis

Scientific classification
- Domain: Eukaryota
- Kingdom: Animalia
- Phylum: Mollusca
- Class: Bivalvia
- Order: Cardiida
- Family: Tellinidae
- Genus: Gastrana; Schumacher, 1817

= Gastrana =

Genus of bivalve molluscs

Gastrana is a genus of bivalves belonging to the family Tellinidae.

The genus has almost cosmopolitan distribution.

Species:

- Gastrana aquitanica Cossmann & Peyrot, 1910
- Gastrana fragilis (Linnaeus, 1758)
- Gastrana lyngei (A.E.Salisbury, 1934)
- Gastrana matadoa (Gmelin, 1791)
- Gastrana multangula (Gmelin, 1791)
- Gastrana orstomi Cosel, 1995
- Gastrana peregrina (Basterot, 1825)
