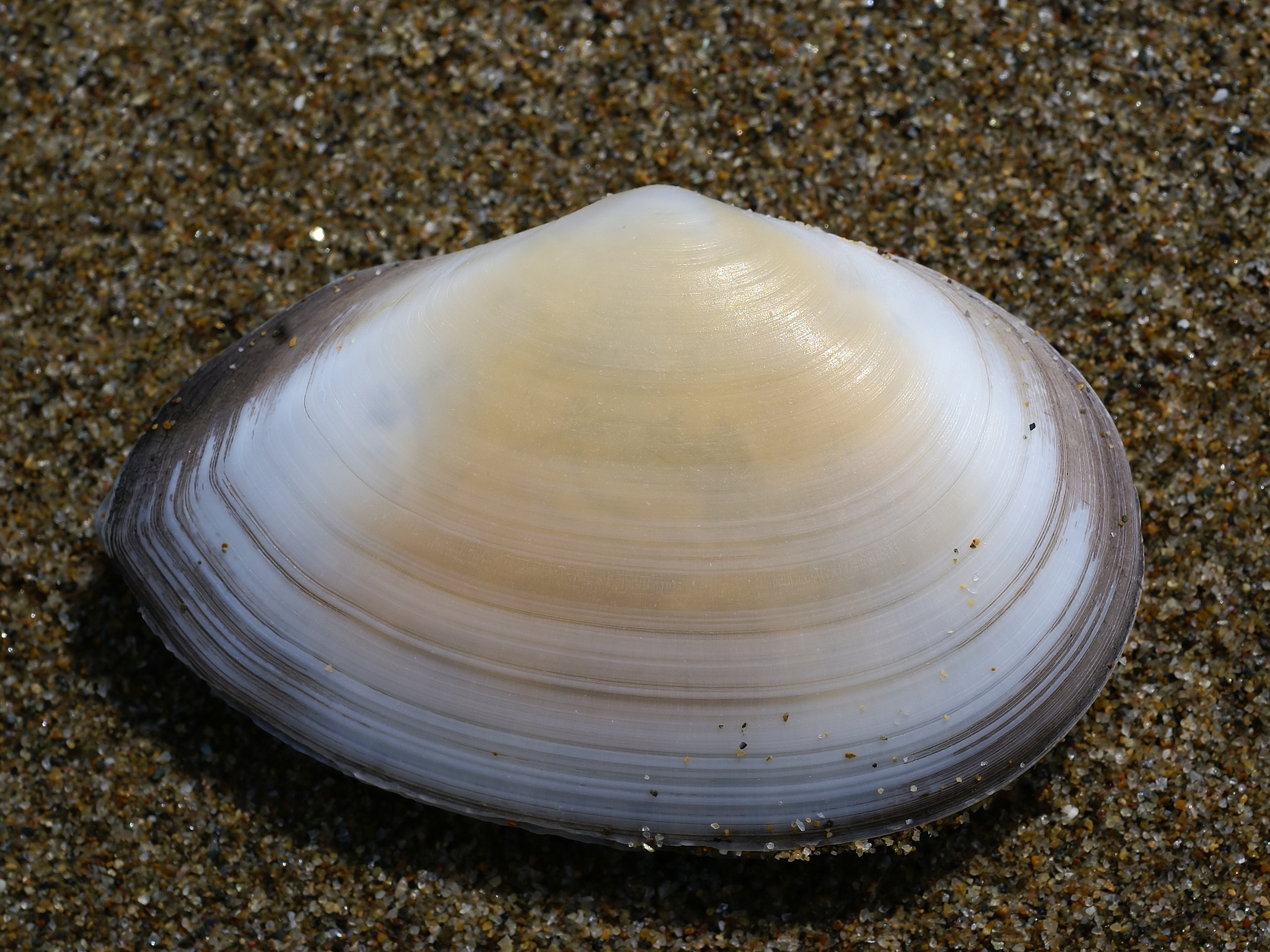
- Peronaea planata

Scientific classification
- Kingdom: Animalia
- Phylum: Mollusca
- Class: Bivalvia
- Order: Cardiida
- Superfamily: Tellinoidea
- Family: Tellinidae
- Genus: Peronaea; Poli, 1791

Species
- See text

= Peronaea =

Genus of bivalves

Peronaea is a genus of marine bivalve molluscs, in the subfamily Tellininae of the family Tellinidae.

== Species ==
- † Peronaea basteroti Lesport, Lozouet & Pacaud, 2019
- Peronaea madagascariensis (Gmelin, 1791)
- Peronaea manumissa (Melvill, 1898)
- Peronaea mars (Hanley, 1846)
- † Peronaea pahiensis (C. A. Fleming, 1950)
- Peronaea planata (Linnaeus, 1758)
- † Peronaea robini (Finlay, 1924)
- Peronaea strigosa (Gmelin,1791)
- † Peronaea zonaria (Lamarck, 1806)
