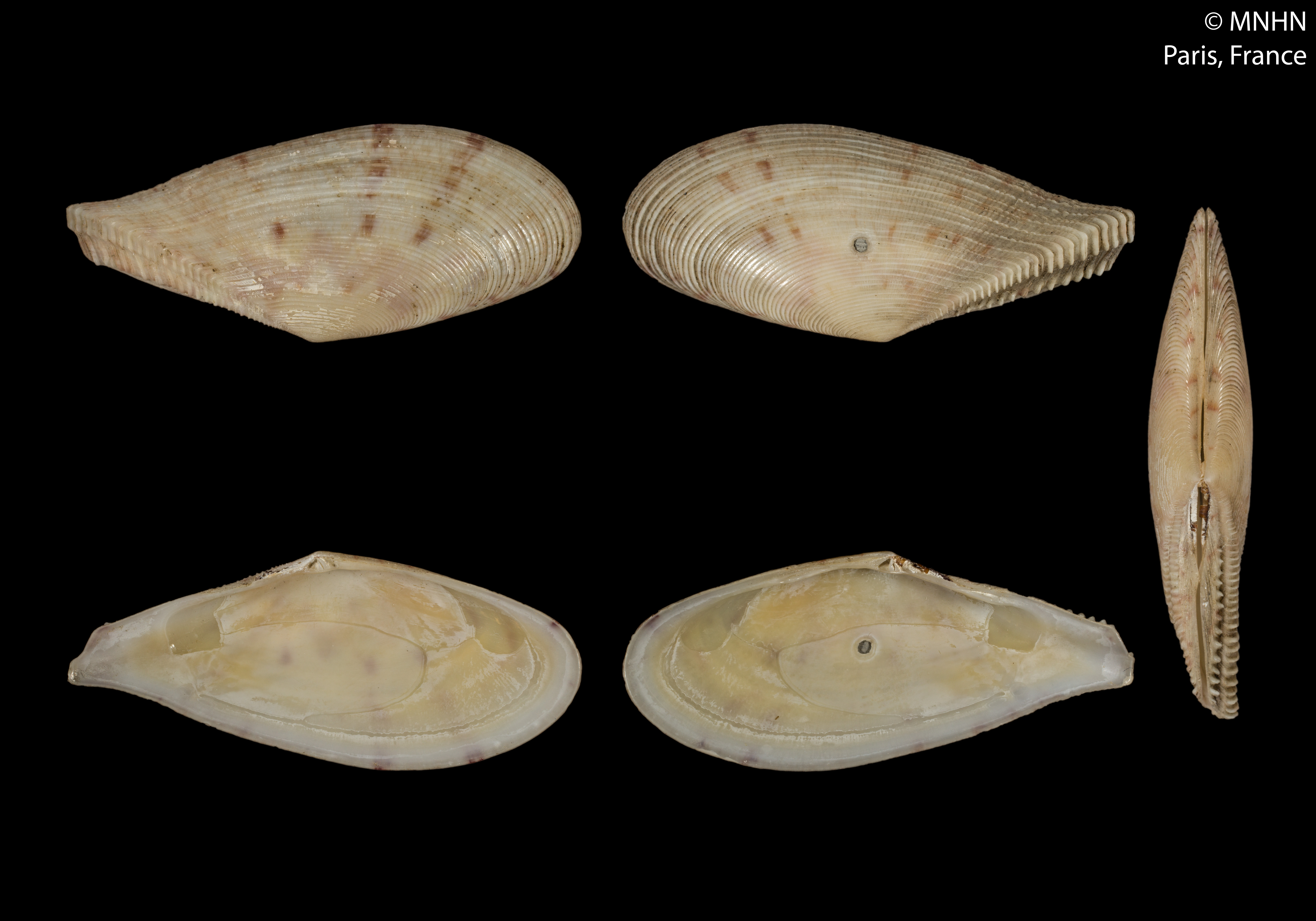
- Shell of Tellinella mexicana (syntype at MNHN, Paris)

Scientific classification
- Kingdom: Animalia
- Phylum: Mollusca
- Class: Bivalvia
- Order: Cardiida
- Superfamily: Tellinoidea
- Family: Tellinidae
- Genus: Tellinella; Mörch, 1853

Type species
- Tellina virgata Linnaeus, 1758

Synonyms
- Liotribella Afshar, 1969; Tellina (Eutellina) P. Fischer, 1887 (objective synonym); Tellina (Tellinella) Mörch, 1853 · alternate representation; Tellinarius A. E. Salisbury, 1934

= Tellinella =

Genus of bivalves

Tellinella is a genus of marine bivalve molluscs, in the subfamily Tellininae of the family Tellinidae.

== Species ==
- † Tellinella acutangula (Deshayes, 1857)
- † Tellinella biangularis (Deshayes, 1825)
- † Tellinella canaliculata (Edwards, 1847)
- Tellinella cruciata (Spengler, 1798)
- Tellinella crucigera (Lamarck, 1818)
- Tellinella cumingii (Hanley, 1844)
- Tellinella dissimilis (Deshayes, 1855)
- Tellinella listeri (Röding, 1798)
- Tellinella mexicana (Petit de la Saussaye, 1841)
- † Tellinella oblonga (G. B. Sowerby I, 1846)
- Tellinella philippii (Philippi, 1844)
- † Tellinella pseudorostralis (d'Orbigny, 1850)
- Tellinella regina (A. E. Salisbury, 1934)
- † Tellinella rostralina (Deshayes, 1825)
- † Tellinella rostralis (Lamarck, 1806)
- Tellinella severnsi M. Huber, Langleit & Kreipl, 2015
- Tellinella tithonia (A. A. Gould, 1850)
- Tellinella travancorica (E. A. Smith, 1899)
- Tellinella virgata (Linnaeus, 1758)
- Tellinella zacae (Hertlein & A. M. Strong, 1949)

Synonyms

- Tellinella adamsi [sic]: synonym of Pristipagia adamsii (Bertin, 1878) (misspelling)
- Tellinella albinella (Lamarck, 1818): synonym of Tellinota albinella (Lamarck, 1818)
- Tellinella asperrima (Hanley, 1844): synonym of Scutarcopagia pulcherrima (G. B. Sowerby I, 1825)
- Tellinella divergens (Anton, 1838): synonym of Tellinella crucigera (Lamarck, 1818)
- Tellinella exculta (Gould, 1851): synonym of Tellinella crucigera (Lamarck, 1818)
- † Tellinella ferrari Marwick, 1931: synonym of † Serratina ferrari (Marwick, 1931) (original combination)
- Tellinella idae (Dall, 1891): synonym of Idatellina idae (Dall, 1891)
- Tellinella incerta (Deshayes, 1855): synonym of Tellinella cruciata (Spengler, 1798)
- Tellinella patagiata (Prashad, 1932): synonym of Afsharius patagiatus (Prashad, 1932)
- Tellinella pulcherrima (G. B. Sowerby I, 1825): synonym of Scutarcopagia pulcherrima (G. B. Sowerby I, 1825)
- Tellinella radians (Deshayes, 1855): synonym of Pristipagia radians (Deshayes, 1855)
- Tellinella rastella [sic]: synonym of Tellinella rastellum (Hanley, 1844): synonym of Tellinella philippii (Philippi, 1844) (misspelling)
- Tellinella rastellum (Hanley, 1844): synonym of Tellinella philippii (Philippi, 1844)
- Tellinella spengleri (Gmelin, 1791): synonym of Dallitellina rostrata (Linnaeus, 1758)
- Tellinella staurella (Lamarck, 1818): synonym of Tellinella cruciata (Spengler, 1798)
- Tellinella verrucosa (Hanley, 1844): synonym of Scutarcopagia verrucosa (Hanley, 1844)
