= Graffilla =

Scientific classification
- Domain: Eukaryota
- Kingdom: Animalia
- Phylum: Platyhelminthes
- Order: Rhabdocoela
- Family: Graffillidae
- Genus: Graffilla; H. von Ihering, 1880

Genus of flatworms

Graffilla is a genus of parasitic turbellarian flatworms.

A species within Graffilla, G. pugetensi, is a parasite of the pericardial cavity of the bivalvian mollusc Macoma nasuta.

Graffilla effects reared and wild clam populations in Italy, Spain, the United States, and France.
