= Graffillidae =

Scientific classification
- Kingdom: Animalia
- Phylum: Platyhelminthes
- Order: Rhabdocoela
- Family: Graffillidae

Family of flatworms

Graffillidae is a family of flatworms belonging to the order Rhabdocoela.

Genera:

- Breslauilla Reisinger, 1929
- Bresslauilla Reisinger, 1929
- Graffilla Ihering, 1880
- Nygulgus Marcus, 1954
- Paravortex Wahl, 1906
- Pseudograffilla Meixner, 1938
