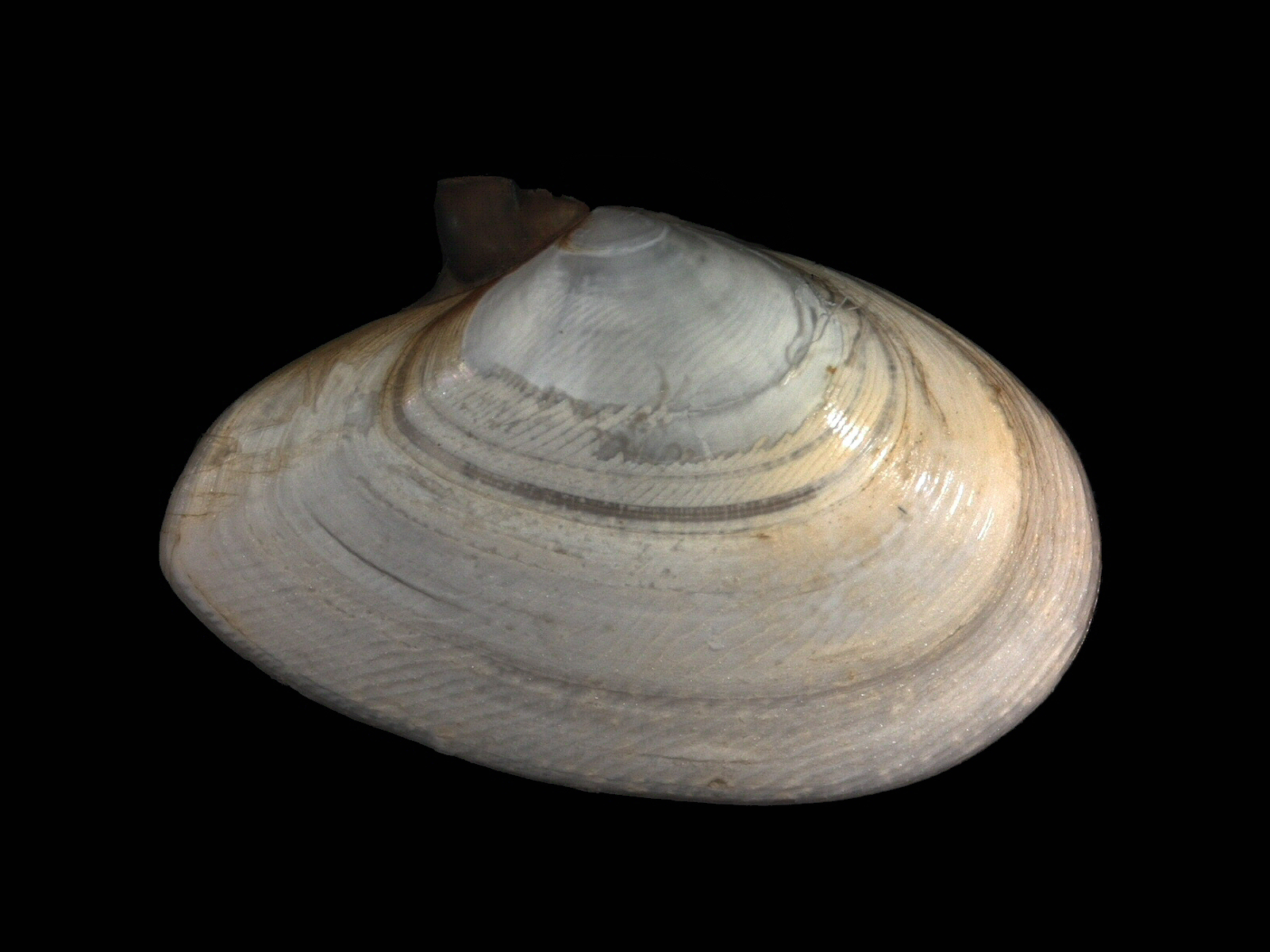
- A shell of Tellina fabula

Scientific classification
- Kingdom: Animalia
- Phylum: Mollusca
- Class: Bivalvia
- Order: Cardiida
- Superfamily: Tellinoidea
- Family: Tellinidae; Blainville, 1814

Genera
- See text

= Tellinidae =

Family of bivalves

The Tellinidae are a family of marine bivalve molluscs of the order Cardiida. Commonly known as tellins or tellens, they live fairly deep in soft sediments in shallow seas and respire using long siphons that reach up to the surface of the sediment.

== Characteristics ==
Tellinids have rounded or oval, elongated shells, much flattened. The two valves are connected by a large external ligament. The two separate siphons are exceptionally long, sometimes several times the length of the shell. These siphons have a characteristic cruciform muscle at their base.

== Selected genera ==
- Abranda Iredale, 1924
- Acorylus Olsson & Harbison, 1953
- Aenigmotellina Matsukuma, 1989
- † Aenona Conrad, 1870
- Afsharius M. Huber, Langleit & Kreipl, 2015
- Agnomyax Stewart, 1930
- Alaona M. Huber, Langleit & Kreipl, 2015
- Ameritella M. Huber, Langleit & Kreipl, 2015
- Angulinides M. Huber, Langleit & Kreipl, 2015
- Angulus Megerle von Mühlfeld, 1811
- Arcopagia Leach in Brown, 1827
- Asthenometis M. Huber, Langleit & Kreipl, 2015
- Austromacoma Olsson, 1961
- † Bartrumia Marwick, 1934
- † Barytellina Marwick, 1924
- Bathyangulus M. Huber, Langleit & Kreipl, 2015
- Bathytellina Kuroda & Habe, 1958
- Bosemprella M. Huber, Langleit & Kreipl, 2015
- Cadella Dall, Bartsch & Rehder, 1938
- Coanyax M. Huber, Langleit & Kreipl, 2015
- Confusella M. Huber, Langleit & Kreipl, 2015
- Cyclotellina Wenz, 1923
- Cymatoica Dall, 1889
- Dellius M. Huber, Langleit & Kreipl, 2015
- Elliptotellina Cossmann, 1886
- Eurytellina P. Fischer, 1887
- † Finlayella Laws, 1933
- Florimetis Olsson & Harbison, 1953
- Gastrana Schumacher, 1817
- Hanleyanus M. Huber, Langleit & Kreipl, 2015
- Herouvalia Cossmann, 1892
- Idatellina M. Huber, Langleit & Kreipl, 2015
- Indentina M. Huber, Langleit & Kreipl, 2015
- Indotellina M. Huber, Langleit & Kreipl, 2015
- Jactellina Iredale, 1929
- Jitlada M. Huber, Langleit & Kreipl, 2015
- Laciolina Iredale, 1937
- Leporimetis Iredale, 1930
- Limecola T. Brown, 1844
- Loxoglypta Dall, Bartsch & Rehder, 1938
- Macoma Leach, 1819
- Macomona Finlay, 1927
- Macomopsis Sacco, 1901
- Macoploma Pilsbry & Olsson, 1941
- Merisca Dall, 1900
- Moerella P. Fischer, 1887
- Nitidotellina Scarlato, 1961
- Obtellina Iredale, 1929
- Omala Schumacher, 1817
- Oudardia Monterosato, 1884
- Pallidea M. Huber, Langleit & Kreipl, 2015
- Peronaea Poli, 1791
- Pharaonella Lamy, 1918
- Phyllodina Dall, 1900
- Praetextellina M. Huber, Langleit & Kreipl, 2015
- Pristipagia Iredale, 1936
- Psammacoma Dall, 1900
- Psammotreta Dall, 1900
- Pseudarcopagia Bertin, 1878
- Pseudocadella M. Huber, Langleit & Kreipl, 2015
- Pseudomacalia M. Huber, Langleit & Kreipl, 2015
- Pseudopsammobia M. Huber, Langleit & Kreipl, 2015
- Pseudotellidora M. Huber, Langleit & Kreipl, 2015
- Punipagia Iredale, 1930
- Quadrans Bertin, 1878
- Quidnipagus (Iredale, 1929)
- Scissula Dall, 1900
- Scissulina Dall, 1924
- Scutarcopagia Pilsbry, 1918
- Semelangulus Iredale, 1924
- Senegona M. Huber, Langleit & Kreipl, 2015
- Serratina Pallary, 1922
- Strigilla Turton, 1822
- Sylvanus M. Huber, Langleit & Kreipl, 2015
- Tampaella M. Huber, Langleit & Kreipl, 2015
- Tellidora Mörch, 1856
- Tellina Linnaeus, 1758
- Tellinangulus Thiele, 1934
- Tellinella Mörch, 1853
- Tellinota Iredale, 1936
- Temnoconcha Dall, 1921
- Tonganaella M. Huber, Langleit & Kreipl, 2015
