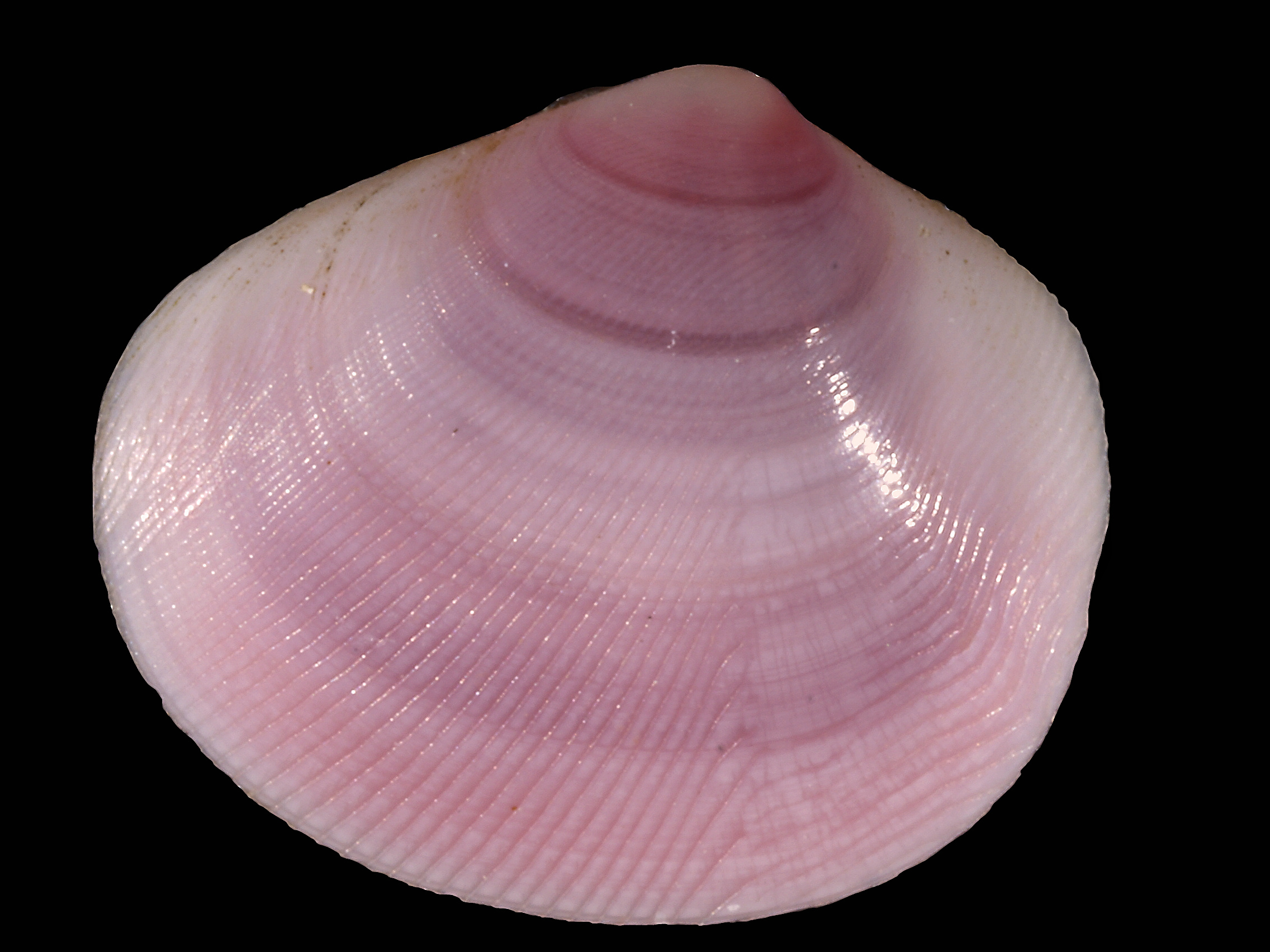
- Strigilla carnaria

Scientific classification
- Kingdom: Animalia
- Phylum: Mollusca
- Class: Bivalvia
- Superorder: Imparidentia
- Order: Cardiida; Ferussac, 1822

Family
- See text

= Cardiida =

Order of bivalves

Cardiida is an order of bivalves belonging to the class Bivalvia.

Families:

- Cardiidae
- Donacidae
- Ephippiodontidae
- Ferganoconchidae
- Glaucomyidae
- Goniocardiidae
- Icanotiidae
- Lahillidae
- Limnocyrenidae
- Lutetidae
- Psammobiidae
- Pterocardiidae
- Quenstedtiidae
- Semelidae
- Solecurtidae
- Sowerbyidae
- Tancrediidae
- Tellinidae
- Unicardiopsidae
