= William Balfour Baikie =

Scottish explorer, naturalist and philologist (1825-1864)

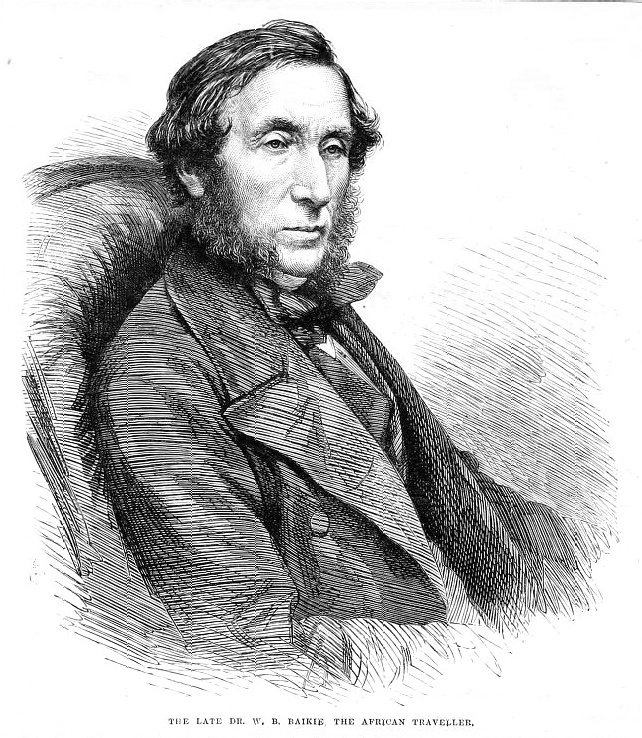
Portrait from Illustrated London News, 28 January 1865

William Balfour Baikie FSA Scot (27 August 1825 – 12 December 1864) was a Scottish explorer, naturalist and philologist.

== Biography ==
Baikie was born at Kirkwall, Orkney, eldest son of Captain John Baikie, R.N. He studied medicine at Edinburgh, and, on obtaining his M.D. degree, joined the Royal Navy in 1848. He early attracted the notice of Sir Roderick Murchison, through whom he was appointed surgeon and naturalist to the Niger expedition sent out in 1854 by Macgregor Laird with government support. The death of the senior officer (Consul Beecroft) occurring at Fernando Po, Baikie succeeded to the command.

Ascending the Benue about 250 miles beyond the point reached by former explorers, the little steamer Pleiad returned and reached the mouth of the Niger, after a voyage of 118 days, without the loss of a single man. The expedition had been instructed to endeavour to afford assistance to Heinrich Barth, who had in 1851 crossed the Benue in its upper course, but Baikie was unable to gain any trustworthy information concerning him. Returning to the UK, Baikie gave an account of his work in his Narrative of an Exploring Voyage up the Rivers Kwora and Binue (1856).

In March 1857, Baikie—with the rank of British consul—started on another expedition in the Pleiad. After two years exploring the Niger, the navigating vessel was wrecked passing through some of the rapids of the river, and Baikie was unable to keep his party together. The expedition survivors were not rescued from Africa for a year. The botanist, Charles Barter, who trained at Kew Gardens and was foreman of Regent's Park of the Royal Botanic Society, London from 1851 to 1857, caught dysentery and died at Rabba, Nigeria in 1859. He is commemorated by the genus Barteria Hook. f. in the Passifloraceae.

Baikie determined to carry out the purposes of the expedition. He first considered establishing a British Consular Agency at Kabba, but faced opposition from the local king - possibly because Baikie was against the slave trade, which still provided a generous income for some tribal leaders.

Landing from a small boat, with one or two native followers, at the confluence of the Niger and Benue, he instead chose Lokoja as the base of his future operations, it being the site of the model farm established by the Niger expedition of 1841, and abandoned on the death of most of the white settlers (see Capt. W. Allen, R.N., and T. R. H. Thomson, M.D., A Narrative of the Expedition . . . to the River Niger in 1841, (1848)).

After purchasing the site, and concluding a treaty with the Fula emir of Nupe, he proceeded to clear the ground, build houses, form enclosures and pave the way for a future city. In less than five years he had opened up the navigation of the Niger, made roads, and established a market to which the native produce was brought for sale and barter. His settlement grew to include representatives of almost all the tribes of West-Central Africa, and more than 2,000 traders visited the town in its first three years. To the motley commonwealth thus formed he acted not merely as ruler, but also as physician, teacher and priest. He collected vocabularies of nearly fifty African languages, and translated portions of the Bible and prayer-book into Hausa and Arabic. Once only during his residence had he to employ armed force against the surrounding tribes. While on his way home, on leave of absence, he died at Sierra Leone.

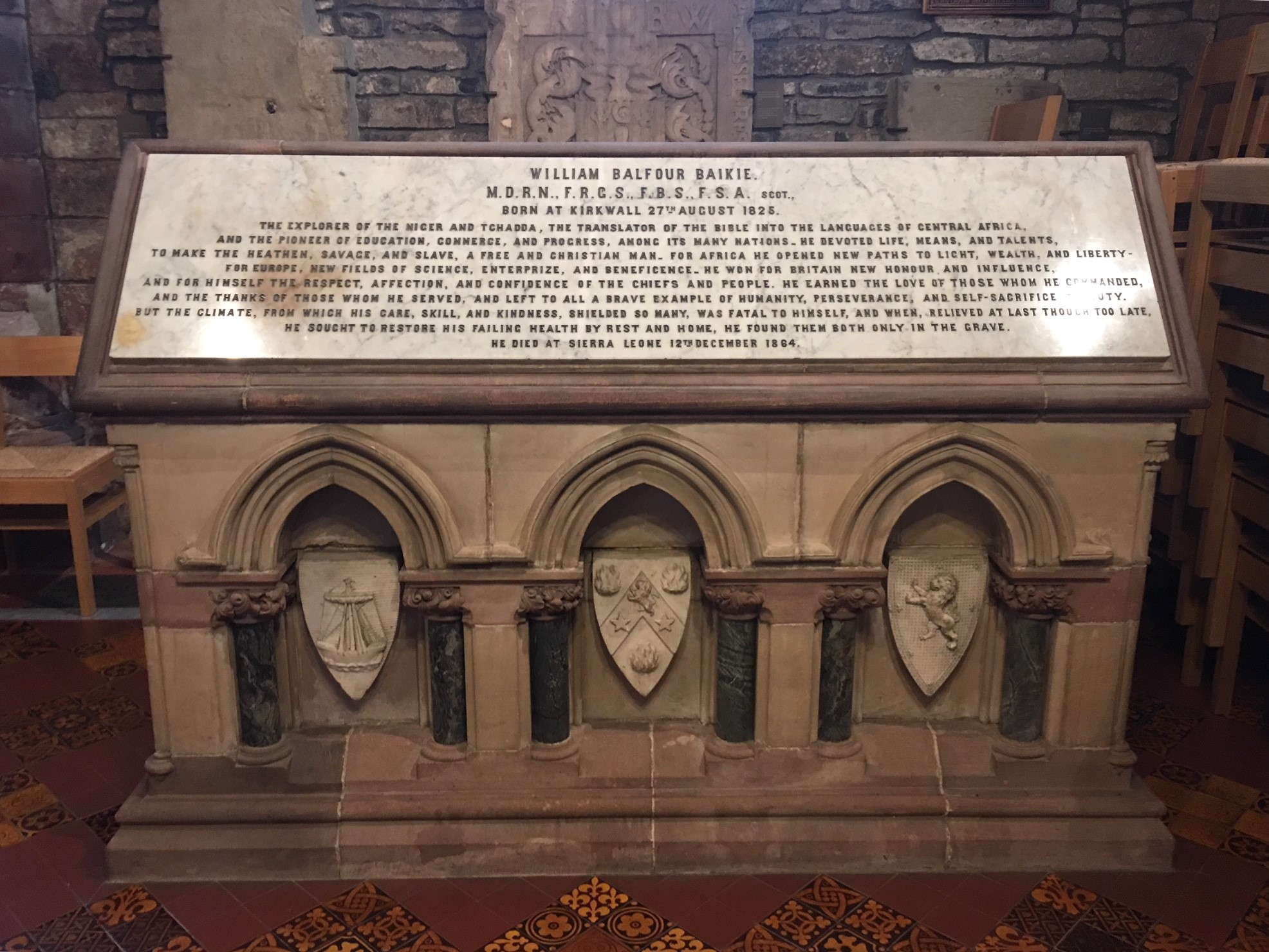
William Balfour Baikie memorial in St Magnus Cathedral, Kirkwall, Orkney

== Works ==
Historia Naturalis Orcadensis. Zoology, Part 1 was published in 1848, but Part 2 was never completed. Baikie's Observations on the Hausa and Fuifuide (i.e. Fula) Languages was privately printed in 1861. His translation of the Psalms into Hausa was published by the Bible Society in 1881. He was also the author of various works concerning Orkney and Shetland.

== Legacy ==
The plant genus Baikiaea commemorates his name. Baikie's published descriptions of Africa helped inspire the Scottish missionary and physician Dr. David Livingston to go to Africa.

After Baikie's death, the British government abolished the consulate (1866), but the trading post remained influential. The district where Baikie had worked so successfully was finally secured for the UK through private enterprise some 20 years later. Lokoja became the capital of the Northern Nigeria Protectorate.

A monument to his memory was placed in the nave of the ancient Cathedral of St Magnus, Kirkwall. The full inscription reads:

"William Balfour Baikie, MDRN, FRGS, FBS, FSA (Scot). Born at Kirkwall 27th August 1825. The explorer of the Niger and Tchadda, the translator of the Bible into the languages of Central Africa, and the pioneer of education, commerce, and progress, among its many nations. He devoted life, means, and talents, to make the heathen, savage, and slave, a free and Christian man. For Africa, he opened new paths to light, wealth and liberty – for Europe, new fields of science, enterprize and beneficence. He won for Britain new honour and influence, and for himself the respect, affection, and confidence of the chiefs and people. He earned the love of those whom he commanded, and the thanks of those whom he served, and left to all a brave example of humanity, perseverance, and self-sacrifice to duty. But the climate, from which his care, skill, and kindness, shielded so many, was fatal to himself, and when, relieved at last though too late, he sought to restore his failing health by rest and home, he found them both only in the grave. He died at Sierra Leone 12th December 1864."

== See also ==
- Selim Aga
