= Louis Fraser =

19th-century British zoologist

Louis Fraser (1810 – 1866) was a British zoologist and collector. In his early years, Fraser was curator of the Museum of the Zoological Society of London.

Little is known about Fraser's early life. He was born in 1810 and married Mary Ann Harrison on 17 February 1844. He worked for fourteen years at the museum of the Zoological Society of London. He worked with the anatomist Richard Owen on studies of the emu and rhea. He participated in the Niger expedition of 1841 as the African Civilization Society's scientist, with Allen and Thomson. On one occasion, he shot down a native boy in mistake for a monkey. He stayed on in Fernando Po and collected.

Upon his return he became in charge of Lord Derby's collection at Knowsley Hall. In 1846 he was sent by Lord Derby to collect in north Africa. In 1848 he became conservator at Knowsley. He wrote Zoologica Typica, or figures of the new and rare animals and birds in the collection of the Zoological Society of London, a lavishly illustrated large-sized book, published in 1849. In this book he described many new species of birds. In 1850, Fraser was appointed Consul of Ouidah in the Kingdom of Dahomey. Around 1857–1859, he collected birds and mammals in Ecuador for Philip Lutley Sclater of the Zoological Society of London, and the year after in California. Upon his return to London, he opened a shop in Regent Street, London, selling exotic birds. The last years of his life he spent in America.

Fraser wrote a Catalogue of the Knowsley Collections (1850) and described several new species including the Derbyan parakeet Psittacula derbiana named after his employer. A number of species and subspecies have been named in his honour, including Fraser's anole (Anolis fraseri), Fraser's ground snake (Liophis epinephelus fraseri), a centipede snake (Tantilla fraseri, a synonym of Tantilla melanocephala), Fraser's eagle-owl (Bubo poensis), Fraser's warbler (Myiothlypis fraseri), and Fraser's musk shrew (Crocidura poensis). Died at age 56.

A son Oscar Louis Fraser worked as an assistant in the Indian Museum at Calcutta from 1871.
