= Pedro Gibert =

Pedro Gibert may refer to:

- Pedro Gibert (footballer) (1888–1966), Spanish footballer
- Pedro Gilbert (1797–1835), Spanish pirate, privateer, and slave trader
