= Margaret Nisbet =

Forger (d. 1727)

Margaret Nisbet aka Margaret MacLeod aka Mrs M'Leod (? - 1727) was a forger, executed in Edinburgh in 1727.

== Life ==
She was married to Alexander MacLeod, a wigmaker in Leith. In 1726, she tried to pass a forged bill, which she claimed to have been signed by Lady Henrietta Mordaunt, wife of Alexander Gordon, 2nd Duke of Gordon. In May 1726, Mr Petrie, a town-officer in Leith, held the Duchess of Gordon's bill for £58, which had been blank endorsed by MacLeod as a security for £6, a sum which MacLeod was going to use to get her husband released from prison. George Henderson, an Edinburgh merchant, had drawn the bill for £53. Both MacLeod and Henderson were arrested, and the trial was to determine which of them had originally forged the bill. Henderson was about to have verdict decided when the judges decided to delay until the Winter Session. During the delay it was revealed that MacLeod had in fact engaged David Household, a seventeen-year-old servant, to write up the bill, disguising him as Henderson while he wrote in order to deflect guilt from herself onto Henderson. The court found only MacLeod guilty and sentenced her to death.

== Scandal ==
The notoriety of the case, partly because of the unwitting involvement of a member of the aristocracy, and partly because of MacLeod's comportment at her execution, resulted in a flurry of ballads and verse libels being produced about the trial and MacLeod's execution. Several of these depict MacLeod as a pimp (bawd) and a prostitute, although the trial provides no evidence for this. In a letter from John Boyd to Reverend Robert Wodrow, Boyd says about MacLeod, "She was a very lewd woman, in keeping disorderly houses at Edinburgh, Cowgate, and Leith, and it is now concluded she will die for this crime."

== Execution ==
MacLeod was hanged on the Grassmarket in Edinburgh on 8 March 1727. By all accounts, she went to her death with flair; Hugo Arnot wrote:

"She went to the place of execution dressed in a black robe and petticoat, with a large hoop, a white fan in her hand, and a white sarsenet hood on her head, according to the fashion of the times. When she came upon the scaffold, she put off the ornamental parts of her attire, pinned a handkerchief over her breast, and put the fatal cord about her neck with her own hands. She persisted to the last moment in the denial of her guilt, and died with the greatest intrepidity."

John Boyd also wrote about witnessing her execution: "I have had occasion to see several die a violent death; but never saw so much natural courage in any. She loads Hendersone [sic] much, whose character is not fair; and by what I can hear by those that had occasion to be by her in the Council-house, before she went to the place of execution, and even there, to the very last, she denied the crime; and, even upon the very ladder, never changed colour, which was very surprising to all present."

== Literary accounts ==
There are six extant ballads and verse libels about the affair:

- The Last Farewel and Lamentation Of Mrs. M'Leoid, who was Execute in the Grass-market of Edinburgh on 8 March
- An Account of the Life and Actions of Mrs McLeod
- A Letter from Doctor Dalgleish to his Patient Mrs. M'Leod, and her Answer.
- An Elegy On the never to be lamented Death of Mirs. M'Leod, who was Execute [sic] on Wednesday 8 March, 1727
- Mrs. M'Leod's last Farewel to John Gibson
- The Apparition

'Doctor Dalgleish' refers to John Dalglish, the 18th-century Edinburgh executioner. John Gibson was one of the witnesses called in the trial of MacLeod. 'The Apparition' refers to the belief that MacLeod appeared as a ghost because she had been wrongly convicted.

== Bibliography ==
- Hugo Arnot, A Collection and Abridgement of Celebrated Criminal Trials in Scotland, From A. D. 1536 to 1784. With Historical and Critical Remarks. Glasgow: A. Napier, 1812.
- Robert Woodrow, Private letters, now first printed from the original mss., 1694-1732. Edinburgh, 1829.
