= Charles Barter =

Scottish gardener and botanist (1821–1859)

- Born: 1821
- Died: 15 July 1859 (aged 37–38); Rabba, Nigeria

Charles Barter (1821 – 15 July 1859) was a Scottish gardener and botanist who trained at Kew Gardens in London from 1849 to 1851. He was foreman of Regent's Park of the Royal Botanic Society from 1851 to 1857.

In 1857, he joined an expedition to Niger led by William Balfour Baikie (1825–1864), a naturalist and philologist from Scotland, who was in correspondence with Charles Darwin. The expedition ended prematurely when the ship hit rocks near Jebba. It took one year for the survivors to be rescued and taken back to England but Charles Barter never returned to his country. He caught dysentery and died in Rabba, Nigeria in 1859. German botanist Gustav Mann was sent to replace him on the expedition after he became ill.

Plants of the genus Barteria Hook. f. in the Passifloraceae commemorate his name.

Palisota barteri is a species from the Commelinaceae family that also honours his name.
