= Old Durban Brook Street Cemetery =

Cemetery in Durban, South Africa

Coordinates: 29°51′31″S 31°00′50″E

Old Durban Brook Street Cemetery is a cemetery in Durban, KwaZulu-Natal, South Africa. It was also known as the West Street Cemetery.

Adjacent to the cemetery is the Emmanuel Cathedral and the Juma Mosque.

== Notable burials ==
- Thomas Baines, artist and explorer
- William Stanger, surveyor
- Rick Turner, philosopher and anti-apartheid activist
