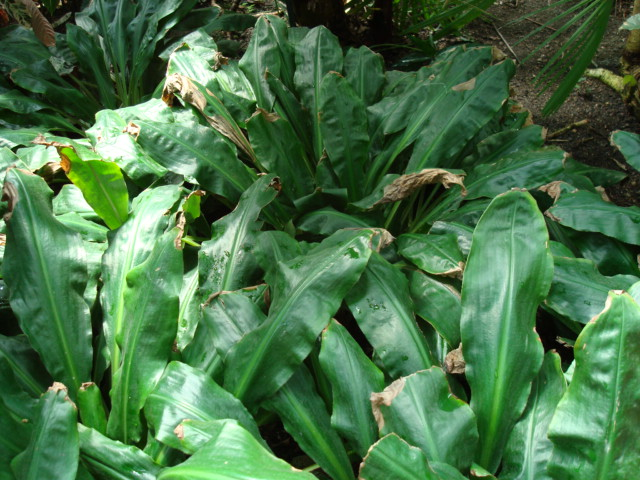

Scientific classification
- Kingdom: Plantae
- Clade: Tracheophytes
- Clade: Angiosperms
- Clade: Monocots
- Clade: Commelinids
- Order: Commelinales
- Family: Commelinaceae
- Genus: Palisota
- Species: P. barteri

Binomial name
- Palisota barteri Hook.

= Palisota barteri =

Species of flowering plant

Palisota barteri is a species of plant in the Commelinaceae family, described in 1862. It is native to western and central Africa. The species thrives in the underwood of pluvial forests.

The genus is named after French botanist Ambroise Palisot de Beauvois and the species is named after British botanist Charles Barter.

Palisota barteri can reach a height of 2 to 5 feet when mature and produces beautiful white or off-white flowers that attract a variety of insects. Its known for its very bright red decorative fruits, however, all parts of the plant are toxic due to the presence of calcium oxalates.
