= Marion Kirkland Reid =

Scottish feminist writer

- Born: Marion Kirkland; 25 March 1815; Glasgow
- Died: 9 March 1902 (aged 86); Shepherd's Bush, London
- Known for: Influential Scottish feminist writer
- Notable work: A Plea for Woman (1843) Woman, her Education and Influence
- Spouse: Hugo Reid
- Parents: James Kirkland (father); Janet Finlay (mother)

Marion Kirkland Reid (1815–1902) was an influential Scottish feminist writer, notable for her A Plea for Woman which was first published in 1843 in Edinburgh by William Tait, then published in the United States in 1847, 1848, 1851, and 1852 as Woman, her Education and Influence under the name of Mrs. Hugo Reid. She was a member of the Ladies National Association for the Repeal of the Contagious Diseases Acts.

== Biography ==
Her father, James Kirkland, was a merchant in Glasgow. Her mother was called Janet Finlay.

Kirkland married Hugo Reid on 8 January 1839 (thereby becoming the sister-in-law to David Boswell Reid). Reid was a progressive educationalist from Edinburgh.

Kirkland was the only Scotswoman present at the World Anti-Slavery Convention, an event in London during the month of June 1840. Kirkland and other British spectators, including Anne Knight, witnessed some American woman delegates were unable to take part in the convention. There was a large debate after which Kirkland met the leader of the American woman delegates, Lucretia Mott. This event, and an article on "Women's rights and duties" in the Edinburgh Review of 1841, may have inspired Kirkland's book A Plea for Women, written in 1843. Anne Knight sent a copy of this book to Lucretia Mott with her highest recommendation, and its influence grew in America. A Plea for Women is most likely the first work in Britain or the USA that gave importance to gaining both civil and political rights for women. The book was especially significant in the early years of the women's suffrage movement in the USA. A Plea for Woman was, as Susanne Ferguson points out in the preface to the modern reprint of the first edition, "a landmark book as the first to be written by a woman, for women, specifically arguing that the possession of the vote is crucial in ending discrimination" against women in education and employment, and to gain equal rights under the law.

Hugo held teaching posts in Liverpool, and Nottingham, then moved to Halifax Nova Scotia to became principal of Dalhousie College, a post that he held between 1855 and 1860. Marion probably accompanied him to Canada. After the family's return to Britain they settled in Marylebone London, which was the address listed when Marion signed a petition on women's suffrage presented to Parliament in 1866. After Hugo died in 1872, she lived with her only daughter Jessie in Shepherd's Bush.

Both Marion Reid and Mary Wollstonecraft pointed out that the democratic laws of the French Revolution had still not been enforced on half of the world's population.
