= Peter Cormac Sutherland =

British explorer

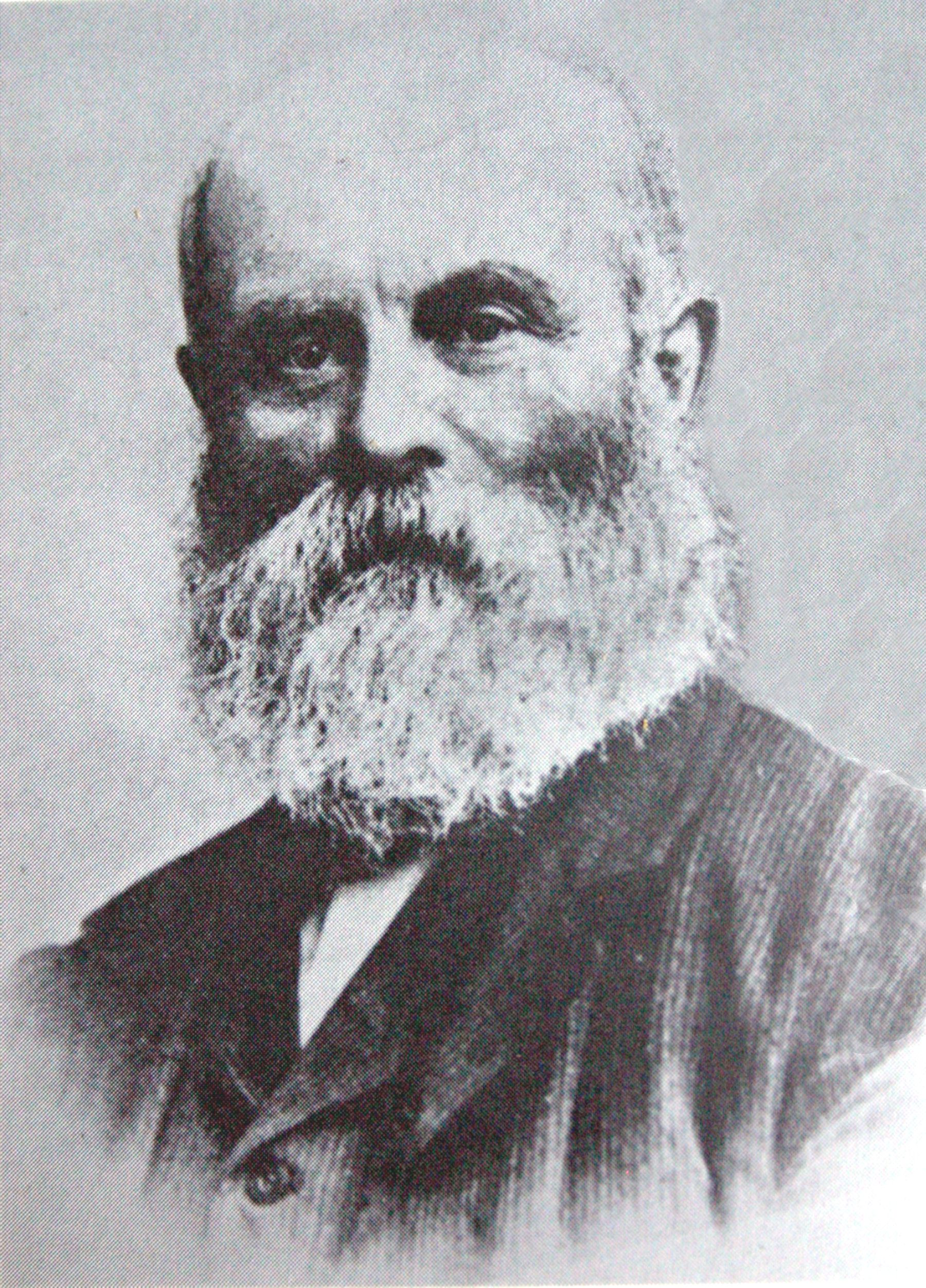
- Born: 14 April 1822; Newlands of Forse, near Latheron, Caithness, Scotland
- Died: 30 November 1900; Pietermaritzburg, South Africa
- Notable works: Journal of a voyage in Baffin's Bay and Barrow Straits
- Children: 2

Peter Cormac Sutherland (14 April 1822 – 30 November 1900) was born in Newlands of Forse, near Latheron, Caithness, Scotland. The son of Robert and Elizabeth Sutherland, he was one of three surviving children of a family of eight, due to smallpox and a drowning accident in Nova Scotia. He became a geologist, physician and an author.

In 1850 he embarked on a campaign to discover the fate of HMS Erebus and Terror after a disastrous polar expedition. It was on that expedition that he sailed under the command of Mr William Penny R.N. on board HMS Lady Franklin and Sophia and from which his book Journal of a voyage in Baffin's Bay and Barrow Straits originated. The campaign was largely a success as they discovered the fate of several crew members of the polar expedition buried at the winter base station.

Sutherland later moved with his wife and two children to Pietermaritzburg, where he later became surveyor-general of Natal, South Africa, succeeding William Stanger. It was while Sutherland held this position that his friend, the father of Cecil Rhodes requested that Cecil reside with him temporarily.

Sutherland was killed in a road accident on 30 November 1900 in Pietermaritzburg, South Africa.

Sutherland's great-grandson, John Cormac Seekings, wrote a biography of Sutherland, entitled Natal's Little Doctor (2013).

== Written works ==
Author: Journal of a voyage in Baffin's Bay and Barrow Straits, in the years 1850–1851, performed by HM Ships ""Lady Franklin"" and ""Sophia"", under the command of Mr William Penny, in search of the missing crews of HM Ships Erebus and Terror. 2 vols. London.
