= Palisota flagelliflora =

Scientific classification
- Kingdom: Plantae
- Clade: Tracheophytes
- Clade: Angiosperms
- Clade: Monocots
- Clade: Commelinids
- Order: Commelinales
- Family: Commelinaceae
- Genus: Palisota
- Species: P. flagelliflora

Binomial name
- Palisota flagelliflora Faden

Species of flowering plant

Palisota flagelliflora is a plant species endemic to Cameroon. It grows on the ground in secondary tropical forests.

Palisota flagelliflora is the only known species in its genus that reproduces by means of stolons arising aerially within a rosette then running horizontally along the forest floor. Leaves are mostly in rosettes, the petioles up to 20 cm, the blades up to 40 cm. Inflorescences are created at nodes along the stolon, each inflorescence consisting of maroon bracts up to 4 cm long, subtending a small group of flowers, some staminate, others hermaphroditic. Sepals are boat-shaped, up to 8 mm long, red and glabrous on the upper side, with long hairs on the under side. Petals white, up to 6 mm long.
