= William Stanger (surveyor) =

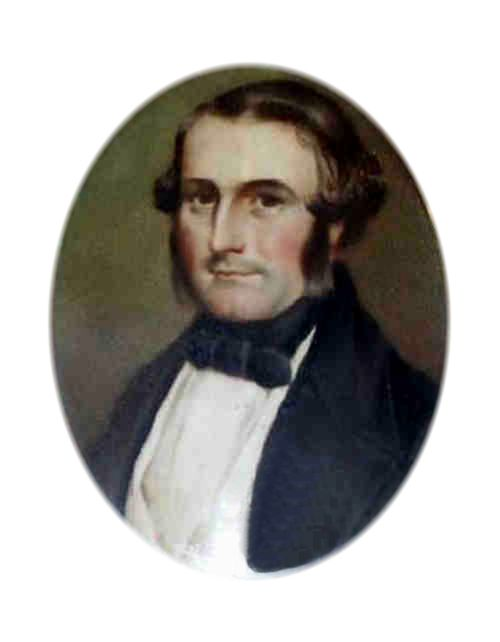
William Stanger

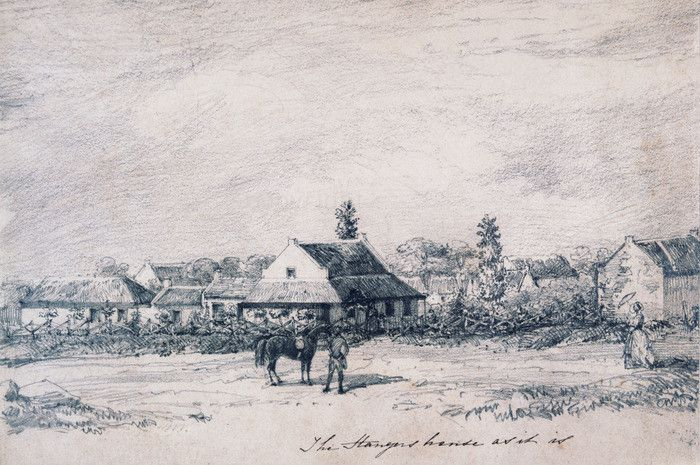
Stanger's house in Pietermaritzburg

William Stanger (27 September 1811 in Tydd St. Mary, Wisbech – 14 March 1854 in Durban) was best known as a surveyor-general in the Cape Colony and the Colony of Natal, but was also a geologist, botanist and medical doctor. He was the son of Willam Stanger and Mary Dent. He studied medicine and natural science at Edinburgh University, and after returning from a trip to Australia and New Zealand, ran a practice in London for some time.

William Stanger took part as geologist and doctor in the ill-fated 1841 British expedition to the Niger River. Three vessels steamed about 320 miles up the Niger and Chadda. Treaties were signed with the two black Princes of Eboe and Iddah, agreeing to the abolition of the slave trade and of human sacrifices, and the signatories were then left to resume their normal practices. An extract from a letter written on board the "Æthiope" on 21 October 1841 - "We entered the Nun on the 10th inst., and proceeded up the river the next morning, and fell in with the "Albert" on the evening of the 13th inst. at Stirling Island, about 24 miles below Eboe. We found her in a worse state than the "Wilberforce"; all hands down with fever but for Drs M'William, Stanger, a scientific gentleman, a marine, the boatswain's mate, and a servant. Captain Trotter very weak, Captain Bird Allen (who is since dead) very low; no engineers; Dr. Stanger was endeavouring to work the engine the best way he could. We sent our head engineer on board, and the "Albert" followed the "Æthiope" to the coast. Captain Becroft then went on board the "Albert", and took her to Fernando Po." - The Times, 27 January 1842

And from the report of Captain Trotter: "From want of engineers we should have had to drop down the whole length of the river without steam, had not Dr. Stanger, the geologist, in the most spirited manner, after consulting Tredgold's work on steam, and getting some little instruction from the convalescent engineer, undertaken to work the engine himself. The heat of the engine-room affected the engineer so much as to throw him back in his convalescence, and prevent him rendering any further assistance, but Dr. Stanger took the vessel safely below Eboe, without anything going wrong with the machinery."

Stanger arrived in poor health in the Cape in 1843. He came highly commended by the Secretary of State for the Colonies, and immediately started on surveying the route for the proposed road joining Cape Town to Grahamstown. In 1845 he was appointed surveyor-general in Natal. One of Stanger's first tasks was fixing Natal's exact boundary and mapping its main geographical features, publishing a topographical map in 1848. Following on this he carried out a survey of Durban, Pietermaritzburg and smaller villages, and planned the route of the main road between Durban and Pietermaritzburg. Stanger erected the small building which later housed the Natal Training College in Pietermaritzburg, and which became Government House in 1850, having been acquired by Sir Benjamin Pine, Lieutenant Governor of Natal (1850-1855).

According to an obituary in The Lancet, Stanger suffered a premature death as a consequence of the so-called hydropathic treatment. A horseback ride from Pietermaritzburg to Port Natal (Durban) had exhausted him, and he was persuaded to 'submit to the application of the "wet shed". The next day inflammation of the lungs took place, which carried him off in one week'. He os buried in Old Durban Brook Street Cemetery.

Botany was one of Stanger's enduring interests and the genus Stangeria was named in his honour, as was the small town of Stanger in Natal, laid out in March 1873 by the incumbent surveyor-general Dr. P.C. Sutherland and named after his late predecessor.

The town of Stanger, now known as KwaDukuza on the north coast of Kwazulu-Natal was named after him.

William Stanger is commemorated in the scientific name of a species of lizard, Chioninia stangeri. He is also honored by the name Gari stangeri, a species of pink clam from New Zealand.

== Marriage ==
William Stanger married on 22 September 1842 in Lowestoft, Sarah Hursthouse (17 August 1809 Wisbech - 4 May 1873 Hunstanton), daughter of Charles Hursthouse (1781-1854) and Mary Jecks (1785-1821). The marriage produced four children:

1. Mary Alice Stanger (1845 Pietermaritzburg - 1930)
2. William Harry Stanger (1847 Pietermaritzburg - 1903 Sydney
3. Harriett Edith Stanger (September 1851 Wisbech - 1937
4. William Hursthouse Stanger (December 1852 Wisbech - 1931 Sydney)

== Notable people from article ==
- Thomas Tredgold
- Benjamin Pine
- Peter Cormack Sutherland
- Capt. Trotter
