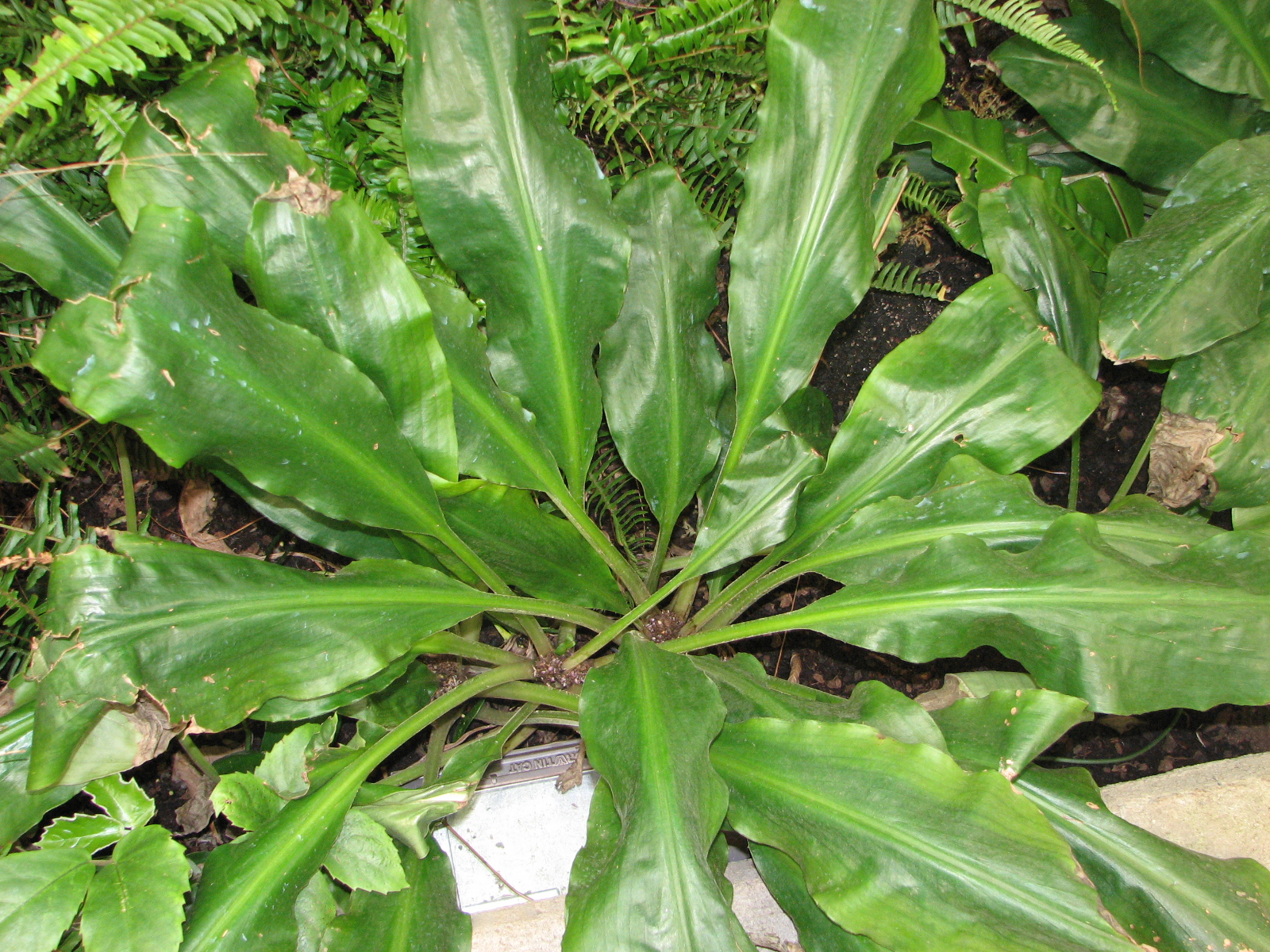
- Palisota barteri

Scientific classification
- Kingdom: Plantae
- Clade: Tracheophytes
- Clade: Angiosperms
- Clade: Monocots
- Clade: Commelinids
- Order: Commelinales
- Family: Commelinaceae
- Subfamily: Commelinoideae
- Tribe: Tradescantieae
- Subtribe: Palisotinae
- Genus: Palisota; Rchb. ex Endl.

Synonyms
- Duchekia Kostel.

= Palisota =

Genus of flowering plants

Palisota is a genus of plant in family Commelinaceae, first described in 1828. It is native to sub-Saharan Africa.

Species

- Palisota alopecurus Pellegr. - Cameroon, Gabon, Central African Republic, Congo-Brazzaville
- Palisota ambigua (P.Beauv.) C.B.Clarke - central Africa from Nigeria to Angola
- Palisota barteri Hook.f. - western + central Africa
- Palisota bicolor Mast. - Bioko
- Palisota bogneri Brenan - Gabon, Equatorial Guinea
- Palisota brachythyrsa Mildbr. - Cameroon, Gabon, Central African Republic, Congo-Brazzaville, Zaïre
- Palisota bracteosa C.B.Clarke - western + central Africa; naturalized in Trinidad & Tobago
- Palisota congolana Hua - Congo-Brazzaville
- Palisota flagelliflora Faden - Cameroon
- Palisota gracilior Mildbr. - Cameroon
- Palisota hirsuta (Thunb.) K.Schum. - western + central Africa
- Palisota lagopus Mildbr. - Gabon, Central African Republic, Congo-Brazzaville, Equatorial Guinea
- Palisota laurentii De Wild. - Zaïre
- Palisota laxiflora C.B.Clarke - São Tomé, Annobon
- Palisota mannii C.B.Clarke - central Africa from Nigeria to Tanzania
- Palisota myriantha K.Schum - Luanda region of Angola
- Palisota orientalis K.Schum. - Tanzania
- Palisota pedicellata K.Schum - São Tomé, Annobon
- Palisota preussiana K.Schum. ex C.B.Clarke - Bioko, Cameroon, Congo-Brazzaville
- Palisota pynaertii De Wild. - Zaïre
- Palisota satabiei Brenan - Cameroon, Gabon, Equatorial Guinea, Congo-Brazzaville
- Palisota schweinfurthii C.B.Clarke - central Africa from Nigeria to Tanzania and south to Zambia
- Palisota tholloni Hua - Cameroon, Gabon, Central African Republic, Congo-Brazzaville, Zaïre
- Palisota thyrsostachya Mildbr. - Zaïre
- Palisota waibelii Mildbr. - Cameroon
