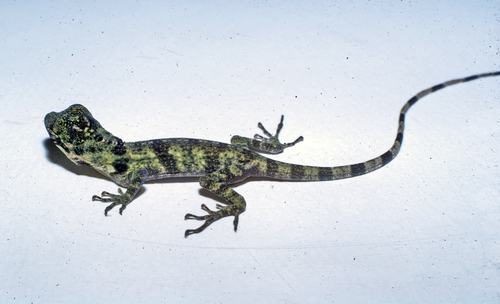

Conservation status
- Least Concern (IUCN 3.1)

Scientific classification
- Kingdom: Animalia
- Phylum: Chordata
- Class: Reptilia
- Order: Squamata
- Suborder: Iguania
- Family: Dactyloidae
- Genus: Anolis
- Species: A. fraseri

Binomial name
- Anolis fraseri Günther, 1859

Synonyms
- Anolis fraseri Günther, 1859; Anolis de Villei Boulenger, 1880; Anolis fraseri — Boulenger, 1885; Dactyloa fraseri — Nicholson et al., 2012

= Anolis fraseri =

Species of lizard

Anolis fraseri, also known commonly as Fraser's anole, is a species of lizard in the family Dactyloidae. The species is native to northwestern South America.

== Etymology ==
The specific name, fraseri, is in honor of British zoologist Louis Fraser.

== Geographic range ==
A. fraseri is found in Colombia and Ecuador.

== Habitat ==
The preferred natural habitat of A. fraseri is forest, at altitudes of 400–1,700 m (1,310–5,580 ft).

== Description ==
Large for its genus, A. fraseri may attain a snout-to-vent length (SVL) of 11 cm (4.3 in), plus a tail length of 27 cm (11 in). The legs are long, especially the hind legs.

== Behavior ==
A. fraseri is arboreal, perching high in trees.

== Reproduction ==
A. fraseri is oviparous.
