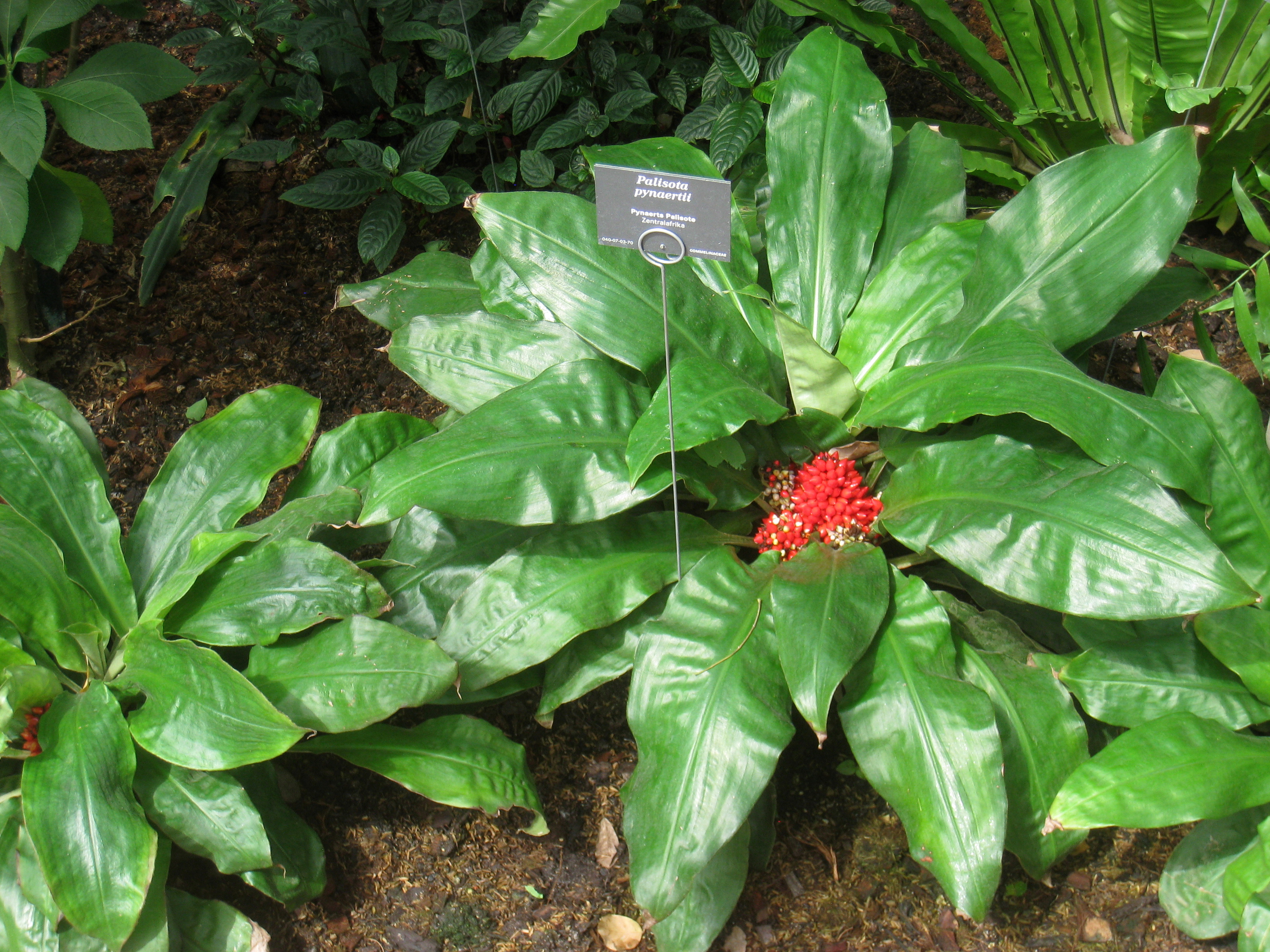

Scientific classification
- Kingdom: Plantae
- Clade: Tracheophytes
- Clade: Angiosperms
- Clade: Monocots
- Clade: Commelinids
- Order: Commelinales
- Family: Commelinaceae
- Genus: Palisota
- Species: P. pynaertii

Binomial name
- Palisota pynaertii De Wild.

= Palisota pynaertii =

Species of flowering plant

Palisota pynaertii is a species of plant in the Commelinaceae family, described in 1903. It may be endemic to the Democratic Republic of the Congo in central Africa.
