= Society for the Extinction of the Slave Trade and for the Civilization of Africa =

1839 Organisation in London for protesting slave trade

The Society for the Extinction of the Slave Trade and for the Civilization of Africa was an organisation set up in London in June 1839 to oppose the slave trade. Fowell Buxton was the principal person behind its establishment. Slavery had been abolished in 1833 throughout the British Empire.

== Objects ==
The objects of the society were:

1. "To make the Africans acquainted with the inexhaustible riches of their own soil, and sedulously to direct their attention to its cultivation on a system of free labour. To convince them, moreover, of the immeasurable superiority of agriculture and innocent commerce, even in point of profit, over the Slave Trade which excludes them."
2. "To instruct the natives in Agriculture and practical Science; to cultivate small portions of land as models for their imitation; distribute agricultural implements, seeds, plants, &c.; introduce local and other improvements; and suggest and facilitate the means of beneficially exchanging the produce of Africa for the manufactures of Europe."
3. "To examine the principal languages of Africa, and reduce them where advisable to a written form."
4. "To investigate the diseases, climate, and local peculiarities of Africa, for the benefit as well of natives, as of foreign residents and travellers; to send out medicines and practitioners; and thus to separate the practice of Medicine from the horrid superstitions now connected with it."
5. "To co-operate by every means in its power with the Government Expedition to the Niger; to report its progress—assist its operations—circulate the valuable information it may communicate; and, generally, to keep alive the interest of Great Britain in the suppression of the Slave Trade, and the welfare of Africa."

== See also ==
- History of slavery#African participation in the slave trade
- Abolitionism in the United Kingdom
