= Selim Aga =

Sudanese writer and critic (1826–1875)

Selim Aga (c. 1826 – December 1875) was a Sudanese man who was abducted by Arab slave traders when he was eight years of age, was brought to Scotland in 1836, and raised and educated as a free man. Selim wrote an autobiography of his life as a slave, accompanied by his poetic Ode to Britain and printed in Aberdeen in 1846. He regularly lectured in Great Britain about African topics, and in 1857 left with William Balfour Baikie for an expedition of the Niger River. Later he accompanied John Hawley Glover and Richard Francis Burton on their African expeditions. In late 1860s, Selim relocated to Liberia, probably aspiring for presidency; he was killed by Grebo insurgents in 1875.

== Childhood ==
Selim Aga, according to his own account, was born in Taqali valley controlled by a chief whose main possessions were the three wells. The people of Taqali practised primitive agriculture and sheepherding, their faith combined Islam with pagan Sun worship. Selim, the oldest boy in the family, was prepared by the father to plow his own farmland; he was abducted by slaveholders when herding the livestock. He and his fellow prisoners were forced to march away from Taqali, relayed between numerous Sudanese, Arab and Turkish gangs of slaveholders. After six months' service to one exceptionally vicious slaveholder, Selim was taken over by a new owner (his seventh) who set up a caravan heading to Dongola. After a brief stay there, Selim was sold again; he ended up on a slave market in Cairo. His ninth master was a European (identified as Mr. P in Selim's book); his tenth was Robert Thurburn (Mr. R. T.), British consul in Alexandria. The new owners taught Selim basic English, took him on a tour of the Cataracts of the Nile, and then prepared for the journey to Britain via Malta, Messina, Naples and the land route to Dover Strait.

== Scotland and London ==
Selim was placed in the custody of consul Thurburn's brother John in Peterculter near Aberdeen, baptised, educated at home and in a local school. In 1846 he published autobiographical Incidents Connected with the Life of Selim Aga, written in "faultless idiomatic English"; it was reissued in 1850. In 1875, the year of Selim's death, his memoirs were published in the Geographical Magazine. The memoirs became the centre of a controversy, with many refusing to believe that the book was written by an African. British explorer Richard Francis Burton came to his former steward's defence, confirming that Selim was, in fact, an African educated in Scotland, and capable of "... briefly anything... he took all the trouble of life off my hands."

His life between 1846 and 1857 remains scarcely documented, but it is known that he fathered at least one son with a local woman. Selim's living descendants from this affair have been traced in Scotland and the United States, one of his descendants has been traced with the name Ben Ferry (16 years old) After leaving the Peterculter home in 1846 Selim resurfaced as a lecturer on the Panorama of the Nile at the Great Exhibition of 1851; he petitioned Lord Palmerston for Amelioration of Africa, promoted an idea of a trans-African east-west railroad to facilitate commerce, and was given an audience at the Foreign Office.

== African expeditions ==
In 1857 Selim Aga sailed with William Balfour Baikie on an expedition up the Niger River; he was placed under command of lieutenant John Hawley Glover and accompanied the latter on a dangerous journey to Lagos to help the survivors of a shipwreck. He attempted to lead a search-and-rescue for the vanished expedition led by Eduard Vogel, but was superseded by Baikie. Since 1860 Selim Aga was in the service of Richard Francis Burton, who regularly praised Selim's assistance and experience.

== Death ==
Selim Aga spent at least nine last years of his life, 1866–1875, in Liberia. He was engaged in searching for mineral resources, surveying the previously unsurveyed Cavallo River valley. Selim's arrival in Liberia coincided with the beginning of clashes between inland native Africans and the African American immigrants from the United States. In 1871, secretary of state Edward Wilmot Blyden was forced into exile; president Edward James Roye was deposed by the mob. Selim was murdered four years later, at a time when he served as an assistant surgeon and was not involved in active politics. According to an obituary published in Liberian Independent 23 December 1875, the Grebo mob leader allowed him time for a Christian prayer, then "chopped his body all over, cut off his head, which he took to his town, and threw the body with a gift [of a Bible] into the field."
