= Thomas Baines =

British expedition artist (1820–1875)

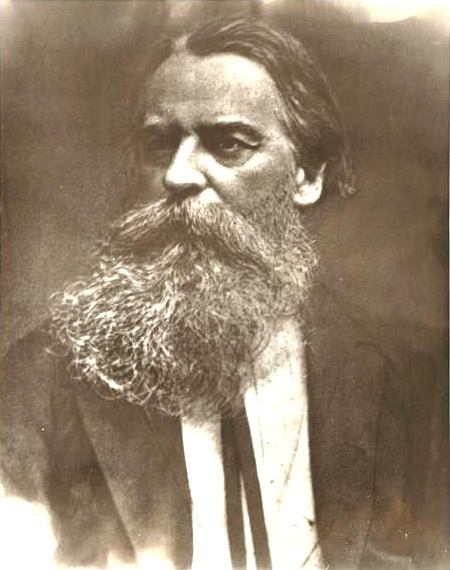
- Portrait of Thomas Baines, ca 1860s; 37 x 29.4 cm. National Library of Australia
- Born: 27 November 1820; King's Lynn, England, United Kingdom
- Died: 8 May 1875 (aged 54); Durban, Colony of Natal (now part of South Africa)
- Known for: Expedition, colonial and wildlife painting
- Elected: FRGS

(John) Thomas Baines (27 November 1820 – 8 May 1875) was an English artist and explorer of British colonial southern Africa and Australia.

== Life and work ==
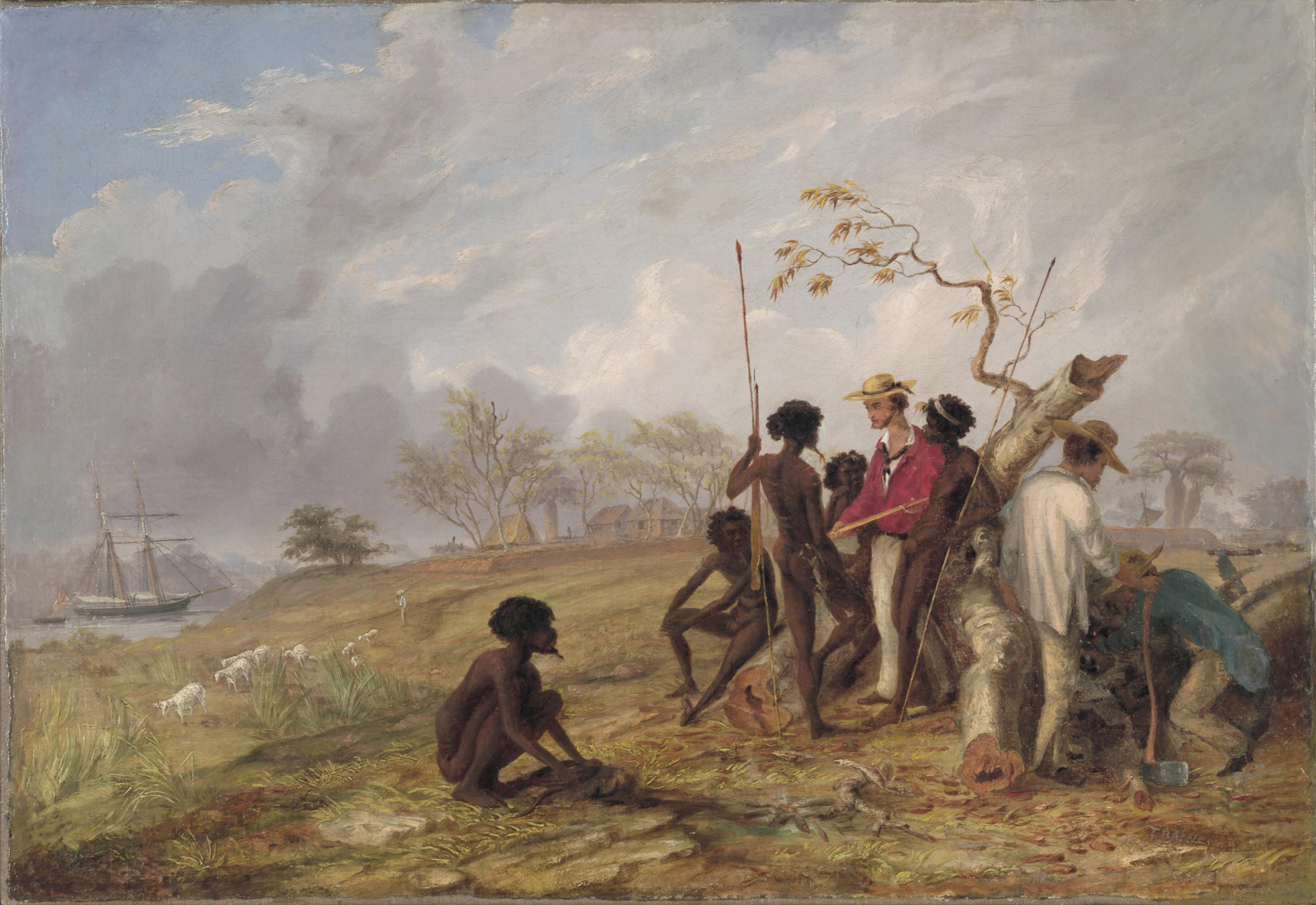
Thomas Baines, Thomas Baines with Aborigines near the mouth of the Victoria River, N.T., 1857: oil on canvas; 45 x 65.5 cm. National Library of Australia

Born in King's Lynn, Norfolk, on 27 November 1820, Baines was apprenticed to a coach painter at the age of 16. When he was 22 he left England for South Africa aboard the "Olivia" (captained by a family friend William Roome) and worked for a while in Cape Town as a scenic and portrait artist, and as official war artist during the so-called Eighth Frontier War for the British Army.

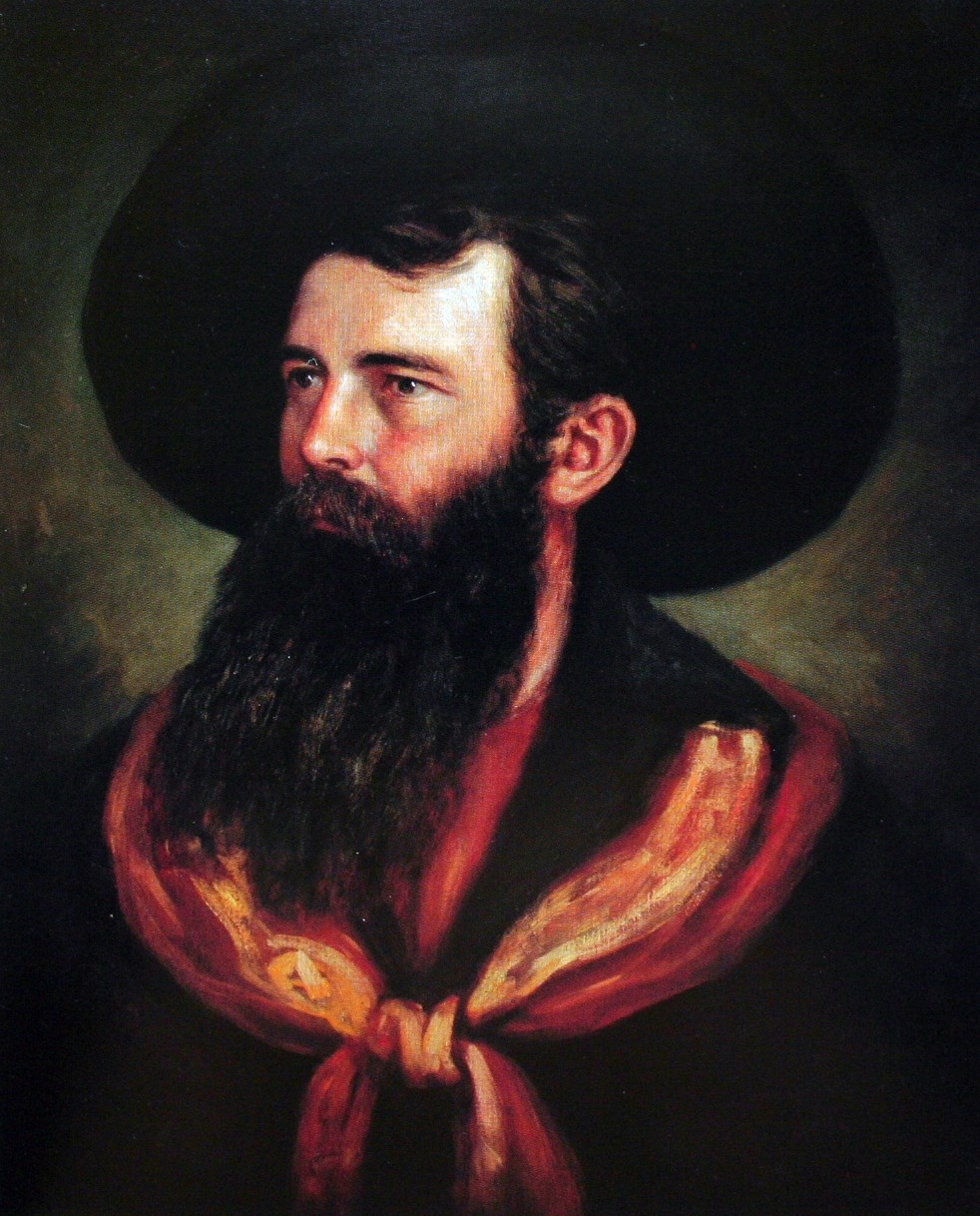
Self-portrait at age 38. Oil on canvas. William Fehr Collection

In 1855 Baines joined Augustus Gregory's 1855–1857 Royal Geographical Society sponsored expedition across northern Australia as official artist and storekeeper. The expedition's purpose was to explore the Victoria River district in the north-west and to evaluate the entire northern area of Australia in terms of its suitability for colonial settlement. His association with the North Australian Expedition was the highpoint of his career, and he was warmly commended for his contribution to it, to the extent that Mount Baines and the Baines River were named in his honour.

In 1858 Baines accompanied David Livingstone along the Zambezi, and was one of the first white men to view Victoria Falls. In 1869 Baines led one of the first gold prospecting expeditions to Mashonaland in what later became Rhodesia.

From 1861 to 1862 Baines and James Chapman undertook an expedition to South West Africa. Chapman's Travels in the Interior of South Africa (1868) and Baines' Explorations in South-West Africa (1864), provide a rare account of different perspectives on the same trip. This was the first expedition during which extensive use was made of both photography and painting, and in addition both men kept journals in which, amongst other things, they commented on their own and each other's practice.

Baines made some of the drawings for the engravings illustrating Alfred Russel Wallace's 1869 book The Malay Archipelago.

In 1870 Baines was granted a concession to explore for gold between the Gweru and Hunyani rivers by Lobengula, leader of the Matabele nation. In 1873 he accompanied Theophilus Shepstone to the Zulu king Cetshwayo's coronation.

Thomas Baines died in Durban on 8 May 1875 and is buried in West Street Cemetery.

== Legacy and Honors ==
Baines is today best known for his detailed paintings and sketches which give a unique insight into colonial life in southern Africa and Australia. Most of his work is held in London. Many of his pictures are held by the National Library of Australia, National Archives of Zimbabwe, National Maritime Museum, Brenthurst Library and the Royal Geographical Society. There are also numerous paintings at the Castle of Good Hope in Cape Town. The Thomas Baines Nature Reserve in the Eastern Cape of South Africa was also named after him.

Baines is also commemorated in the Aloe bainesii T.-Dyer, Albuca bainesii Baker, Iboza bainesii N.E.Br and many others.

== Publications ==
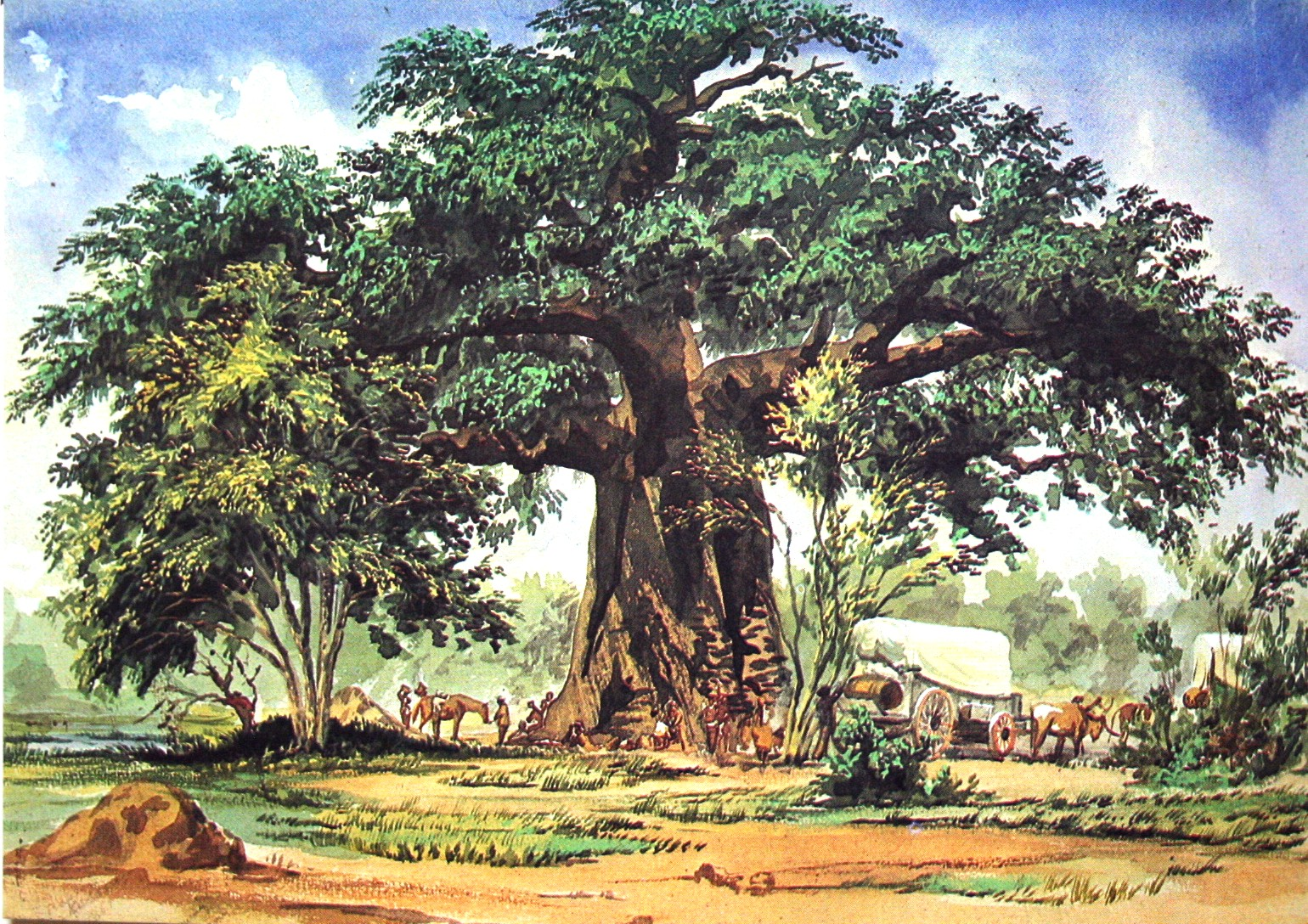
Baobab Tree, South Africa. Watercolour, 29 December 1861

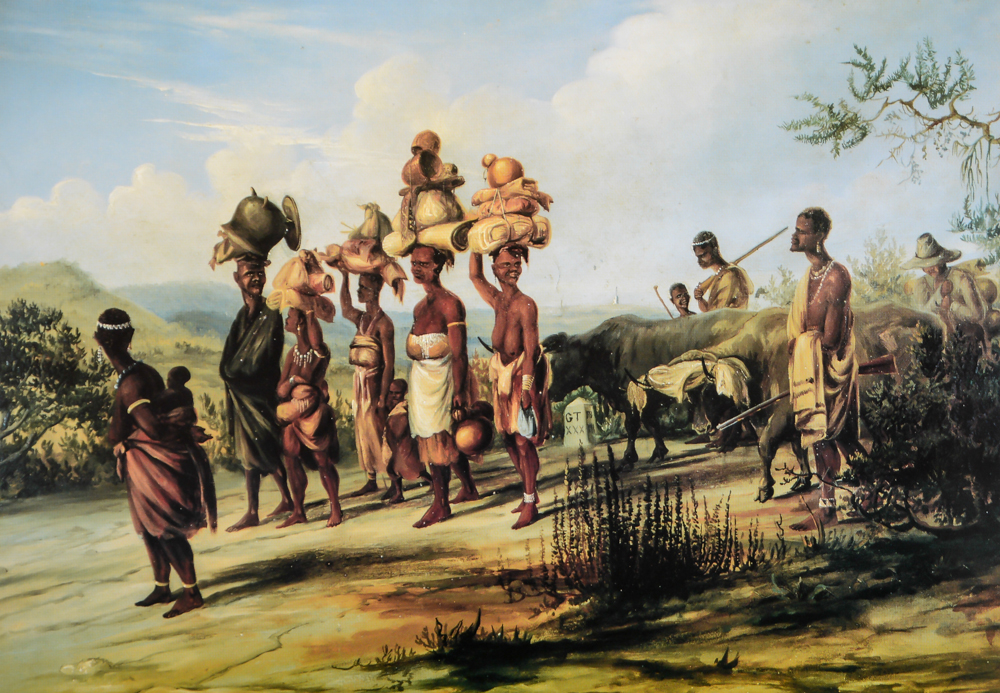
Kaffirs having made their fortunes leaving the Colony, 1848

- Thomas Baines, Explorations in South-West Africa: being an account of a journey in the years 1861 and 1862 from Walvisch Bay, on the Western Coast to Lake Ngami and the Victoria Falls (London: Longman, Green, Longman, Roberts, & Green, 1864).
- Thomas Baines, The gold regions of south eastern Africa (London: Edward Stanford, 1877).
- J.P.R. Wallis (ed.), The northern goldfields diaries of Thomas Baines (London: Chatto & Windus, 1946).
- Fay Jaff, They came to South Africa (Cape Town: Timmins, 1963).
- J.P.R. Wallis, Thomas Baines, his life and explorations in South Africa, Rhodesia and Australia, 1820–1875 (Cape Town: A.A. Balkema, 1976).
- Russell Braddon, Thomas Baines and the North Australian Expedition (Sydney: Collins in association with the Royal Geographical Society, 1986).
- Jane Carruthers and Marion Arnold, The life and work of Thomas Baines (Vlaeberg, South Africa: Fernwood Press, 1995).
- Historic Houses Trust, Cape Town, halfway to Sydney 1788–1870: treasures from The Brenthurst Library Johannesburg (Sydney: Historic Houses Trust, 2005).
- William Barry Lord lavishly illustrated by Thomas Baines Shifts and Expedients of Camp Life, Travel and Exploration (1876)
- "Thomas Baines of King's Lynn, Artist and Traveller". by Henry J. Hillen. serialised in "The King's Lynn News and Norfolk County Press" published between 12 March and 10 September 1898. Transcribed copies are in the King's Lynn Library, and Museum.
