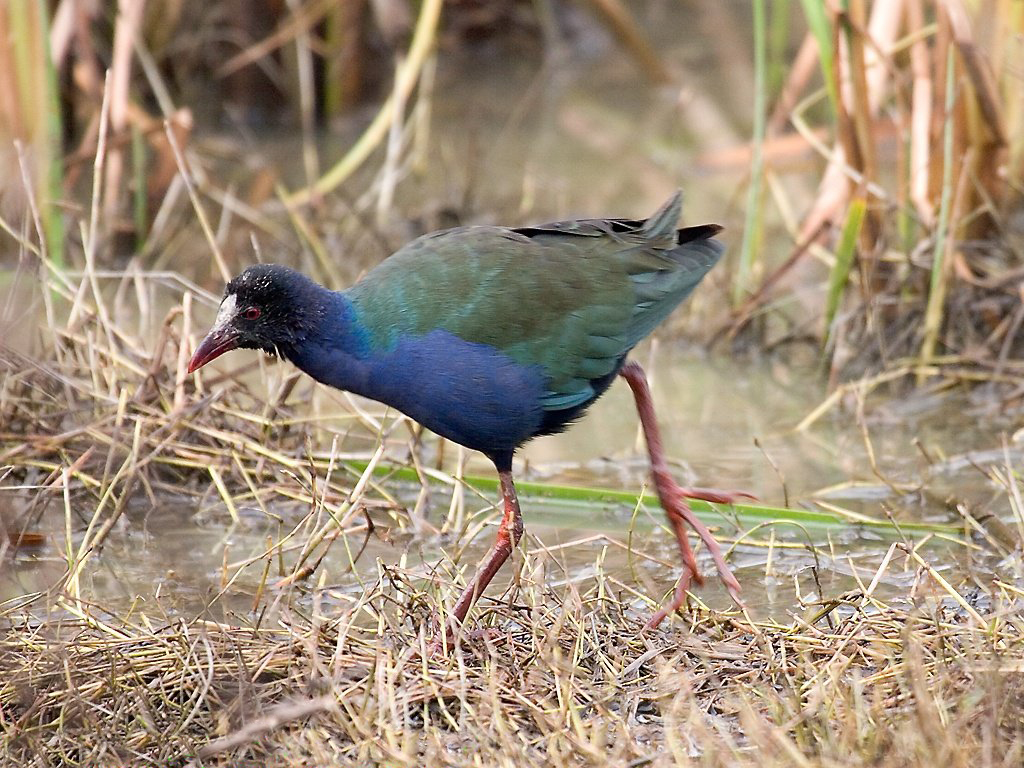

Conservation status
- Least Concern (IUCN 3.1)

Scientific classification
- Kingdom: Animalia
- Phylum: Chordata
- Class: Aves
- Order: Gruiformes
- Family: Rallidae
- Genus: Porphyrio
- Species: P. alleni

Binomial name
- Porphyrio alleni Thomson, 1842

= Allen's gallinule =

Species of bird

Allen's gallinule (Porphyrio alleni), formerly known as the lesser gallinule, is a small waterbird of the family Rallidae.

== Taxonomy ==
Its former binomial name is Porphyrula alleni. Porphyrio is the Latin for "swamphen", and alleni, like the English name, commemorates British naval officer Rear-Admiral William Allen (1792–1864).

== Distribution and habitat ==
Allen's gallinules are found year-round in marshes and lakes in Sub-Saharan Africa. It has occurred as a vagrant in several European countries, and is the only purely Sub-Saharan bird species to reach Great Britain.

== Description ==
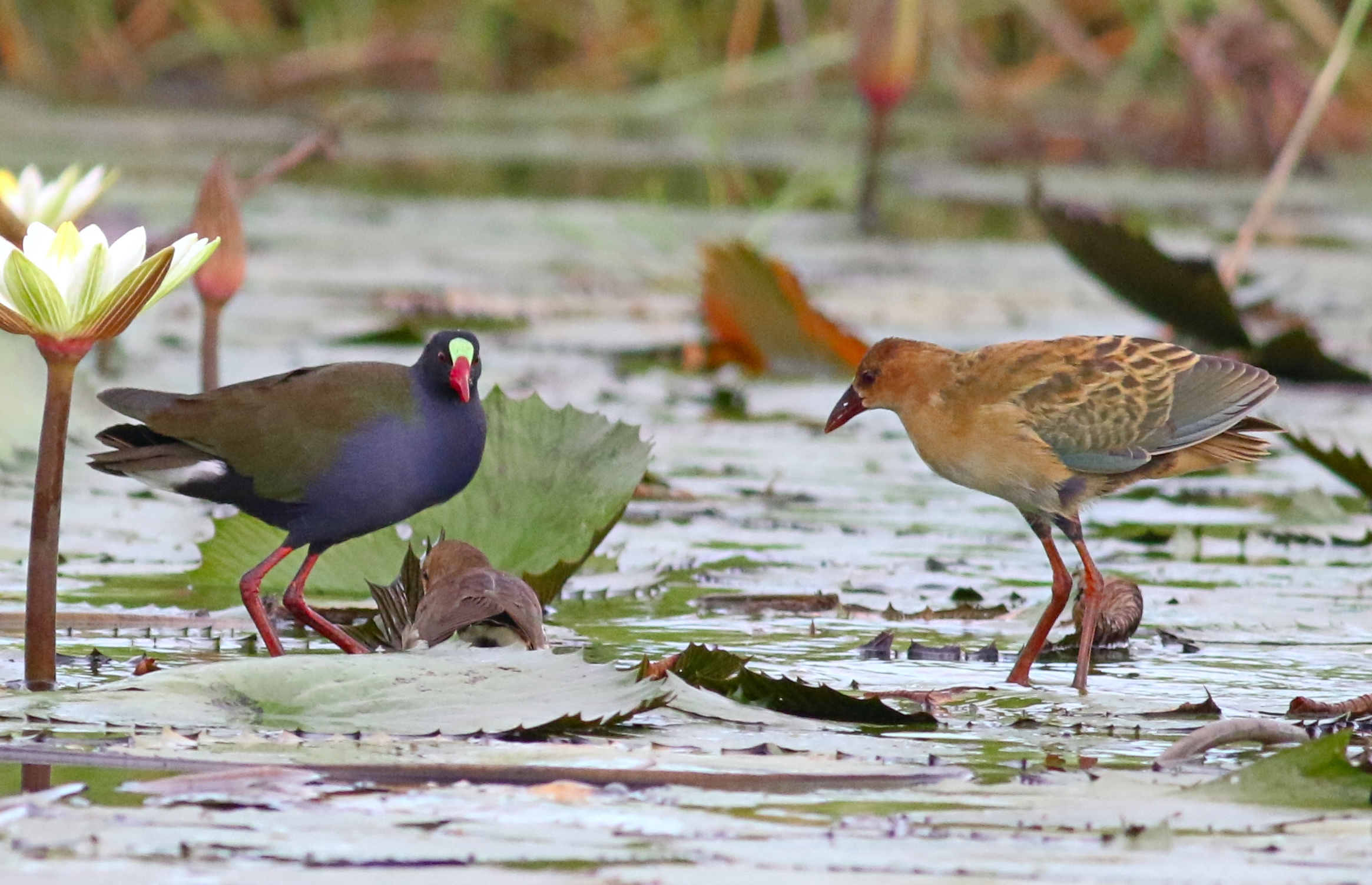
Mature (left) and immature (right) at Chobe National Park, Botswana.

They are similar in size to the only slightly larger water rail. The Allen's gallinule has a short red bill, greenish back and purple upperparts. They have red legs with long toes, and a short tail which is white with a dark central bar underneath. Breeding males have a blue frontal shield, which is green in the female. Immature Allen's gallinules are sandy brown with a buff undertail. The downy chicks are black, as with all rails. They nod their heads as they swim.

== Breeding ==
Allen's gallinules are very secretive in the breeding season, particularly in the dense swamps they favour, and are mostly heard rather than seen. They are then rather noisy birds, with a sharp nasal pruk call. This species is partially migratory, undertaking seasonal movements. They can be easier to see on migration or when wintering. They build a floating nest in marshes and swamps, laying 2–5 eggs.

== Diet ==
These birds probe with their bill in mud or shallow water, also picking up food by sight. They mainly eat insects and aquatic animals.
