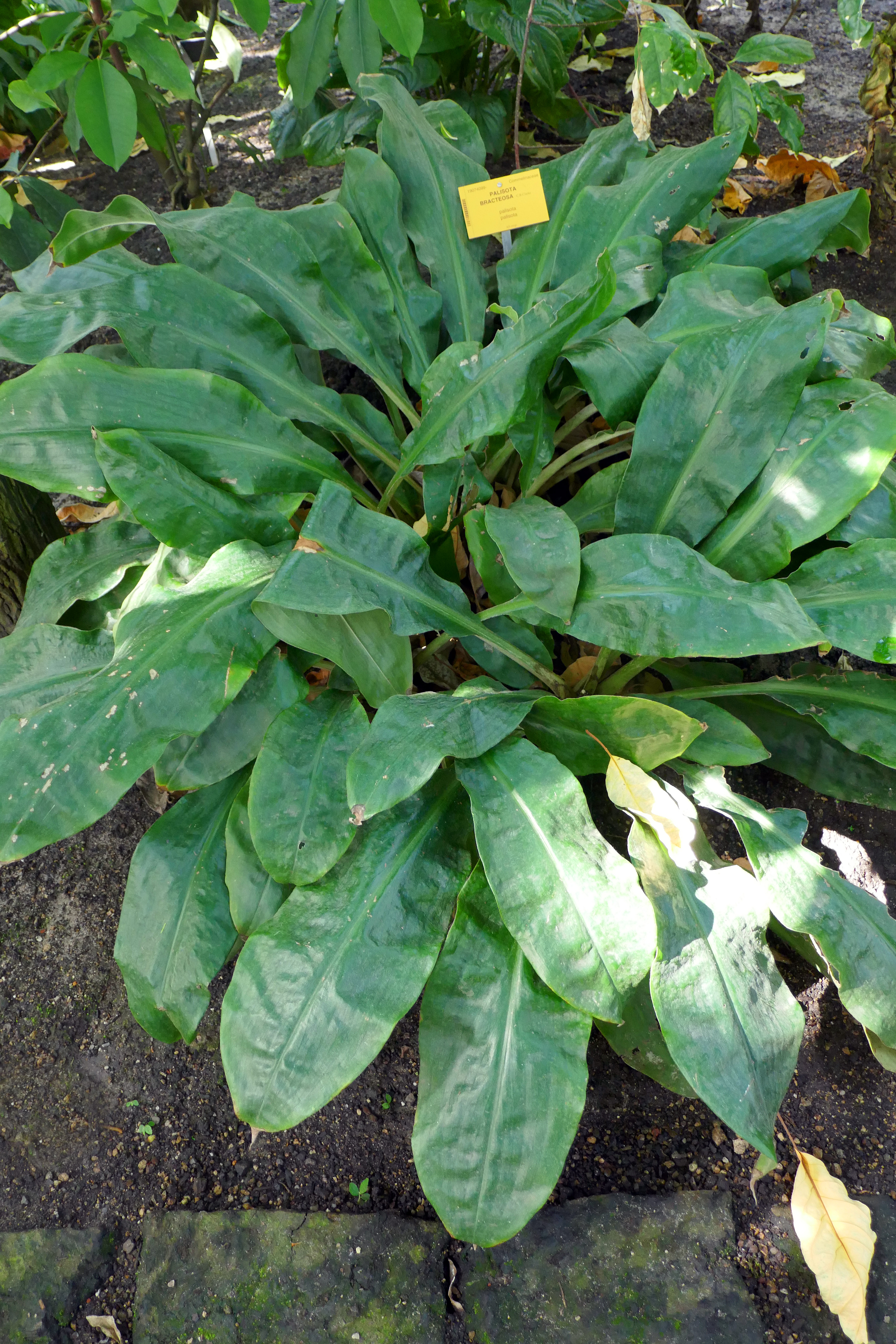

Scientific classification
- Kingdom: Plantae
- Clade: Tracheophytes
- Clade: Angiosperms
- Clade: Monocots
- Clade: Commelinids
- Order: Commelinales
- Family: Commelinaceae
- Genus: Palisota
- Species: P. bracteosa

Binomial name
- Palisota bracteosa C.B.Clarke

= Palisota bracteosa =

Species of flowering plant

Palisota bracteosa is a species of plant in the family Commelinaceae. It is native to western Africa, specifically Cameroon, Equatorial Guinea, Gabon, Ghana, Guinea, Gulf of Guinea islands, Ivory Coast, Liberia, Nigeria, Sierra Leone, and Togo.

P. bracteosa is an herbaceous plant with leaves arranged in a rosette. It lacks a stem. The flowers are pinkish-white or white and the fruits are red.

Palisota bracteosa is used for many different medicinal purposes. Both the hairs and sap of the fruit are irritants.

Palisota bracteosa has been introduced to Trinidad and Tobago, and is naturalized or naturalizing in Hawaii.
