= Robert Jamieson (merchant) =

English merchant (d. 1861)

Robert Jamieson (died 1861) was a London merchant and promoter of commerce with West Africa.

== Life ==
Described also as a palm oil merchant of Liverpool, and as of Glasgow, Jamieson sought to open up major African rivers to navigation and commerce. His schooner, the Warree, went to the River Niger in 1838. In 1839 he equipped the Ethiope, and its commander, Captain John Beecroft, explored several West African rivers, to higher points in some instances than had then been reached by Europeans.

In 1840 Jamieson was offered, but declined, a vice-presidency of the Institut d'Afrique of France. When the Second Melbourne ministry, in 1841, supported the African Colonisation Expedition to the Niger, he denounced the scheme. The attempt was abandoned from September 1841, and on 25 October many of the surviving colonists were rescued by the Ethiope.

Jamieson died in London on 5 April 1861.

== Works ==
Narratives of explorations were published by Jamieson and others in the Journal of the Royal Geographical Society. Jamieson opposed the Niger expedition in Appeals to the Government and People of Great Britain, where he claimed the proposed colonisers would be monopolists. He pointed out the fulfilment of his predictions of disaster in Sequel to two Appeals (London, 1843).

In 1859 Jamieson published Commerce with Africa, emphasising the insufficiency of treaties for the suppression of the African slave trade, and urging the use of the land route from Cross River to the Niger.

== Notes ==
Attribution

This article incorporates text from a publication now in the public domain: Lee, Sidney, ed. (1892). "Jamieson, Robert (d.1861)". Dictionary of National Biography. Vol. 29. London: Smith, Elder & Co.
