= Palisota preussiana =

Conservation status
- Vulnerable (IUCN 3.1)

Scientific classification
- Kingdom: Plantae
- Clade: Tracheophytes
- Clade: Angiosperms
- Clade: Monocots
- Clade: Commelinids
- Order: Commelinales
- Family: Commelinaceae
- Genus: Palisota
- Species: P. preussiana

Binomial name
- Palisota preussiana K.Schum. ex C.B.Clarke

Species of flowering plant

Palisota preussiana is a species of plant in the Commelinaceae family. It is found in Cameroon and Equatorial Guinea. Its natural habitats are subtropical or tropical moist lowland forests and subtropical or tropical moist montane forests. It is threatened by habitat loss.
