= David Boswell Reid =

British physician, chemist and inventor (1805–1863)

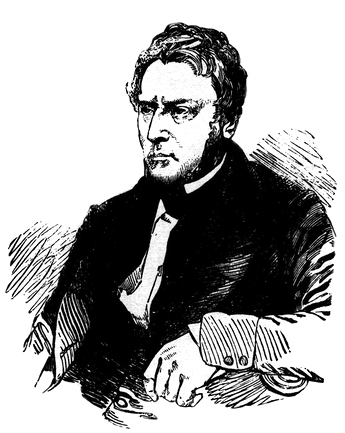
David Boswell Reid

Prof David Boswell Reid MD FRSE FRCPE (1805 – 5 April 1863) was a British physician, chemist and inventor. Through reports on public hygiene and ventilation projects in public buildings, he made a reputation in the field of sanitation. He has been called the "grandfather of air-conditioning".

== Early life ==
Reid was born in Edinburgh in June 1805, the second son of Peter Reid (1777–1838) and his wife, Christian Arnot, eldest daughter of Hugo Arnot of Balcormo, and was the elder brother of Hugo Reid (becoming the brother-in-law of Marion Kirkland Reid upon their marriage in 1839). When born the family appear to have lived with Peter Reid Sr., a vintner at Milne's Square (now known as Milne's Court) off the Royal Mile. His father gained his doctorate as a physician c.1810 and in 1815 the family was living independently at 7 Roxburgh Place in Edinburgh's South Side.

David was educated at the High School in Edinburgh then studied medicine at Edinburgh University, obtained his medical diploma on 12 July 1830, and was admitted a fellow of the Royal College of Physicians, Edinburgh, on 2 August 1831.

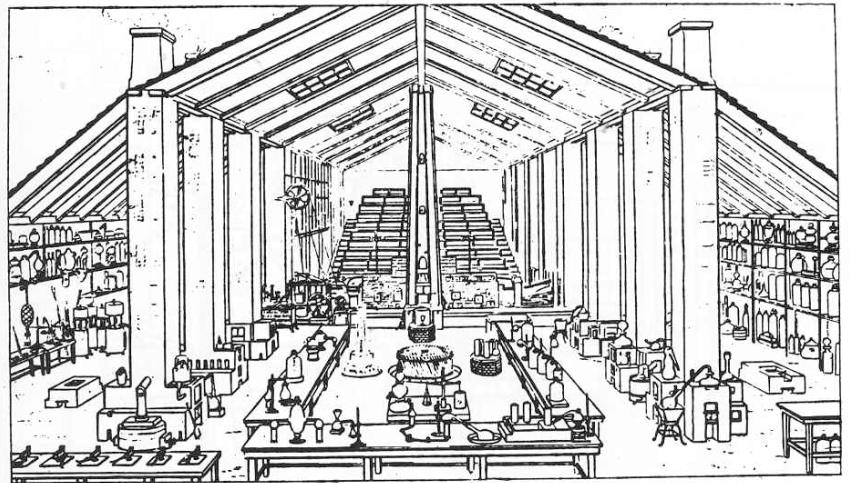
Chemistry laboratory, from Reid's Brief Outline Illustrations of the Alterations in the House of Commons (1837)

In 1831 Reid began to give classes in practical chemistry. He was soon appointed assistant to Thomas Charles Hope, professor of chemistry at the university. The same year he was elected a Fellow of the Royal Society of Edinburgh his sole proposer being Hope. He was living at this time at 37 Nicholson Street, described as "experimental rooms" for Edinburgh University.

In 1833, however, he had a disagreement with Hope. At this point he set up a laboratory of his own. Reid hoped to have a chair in Practical Chemistry set up in his favour; but he came up against Robert Christison as dean of the medical faculty who was opposed, disliking the effect on the existing chair, and regarding Reid's teaching as too mechanical. Reid complained in The Scotsman.

In 1835 at the Dublin meeting of the British Association for the Advancement of Science Reid talked on reform of education in chemistry, and was asked to give evidence to the committee under Thomas Wyse then looking into education in Ireland.

One of his chemistry students was Macquorn Rankine. Reid continued to give private chemistry classes until he moved to London in 1847.

== Reid the Ventilator ==
Reid invited participants at the 1834 meeting of the British Association, in Edinburgh, to visit his laboratory; and among those who took up the offer were some members of parliament. Fortuitously there was a very destructive fire at the Houses of Parliament at Westminster later in 1834, and Reid was brought in as a consultant. He did innovative work in the temporary accommodation on forced ventilation. When the new building work started on the same site, he was in a strong position to carry out plans that were systematic as far as ventilation was concerned. He was remembered as "Dr. Reid the ventilator" in the twenty-first century in discussions of energy efficiency, by Lord Wade of Chorlton.

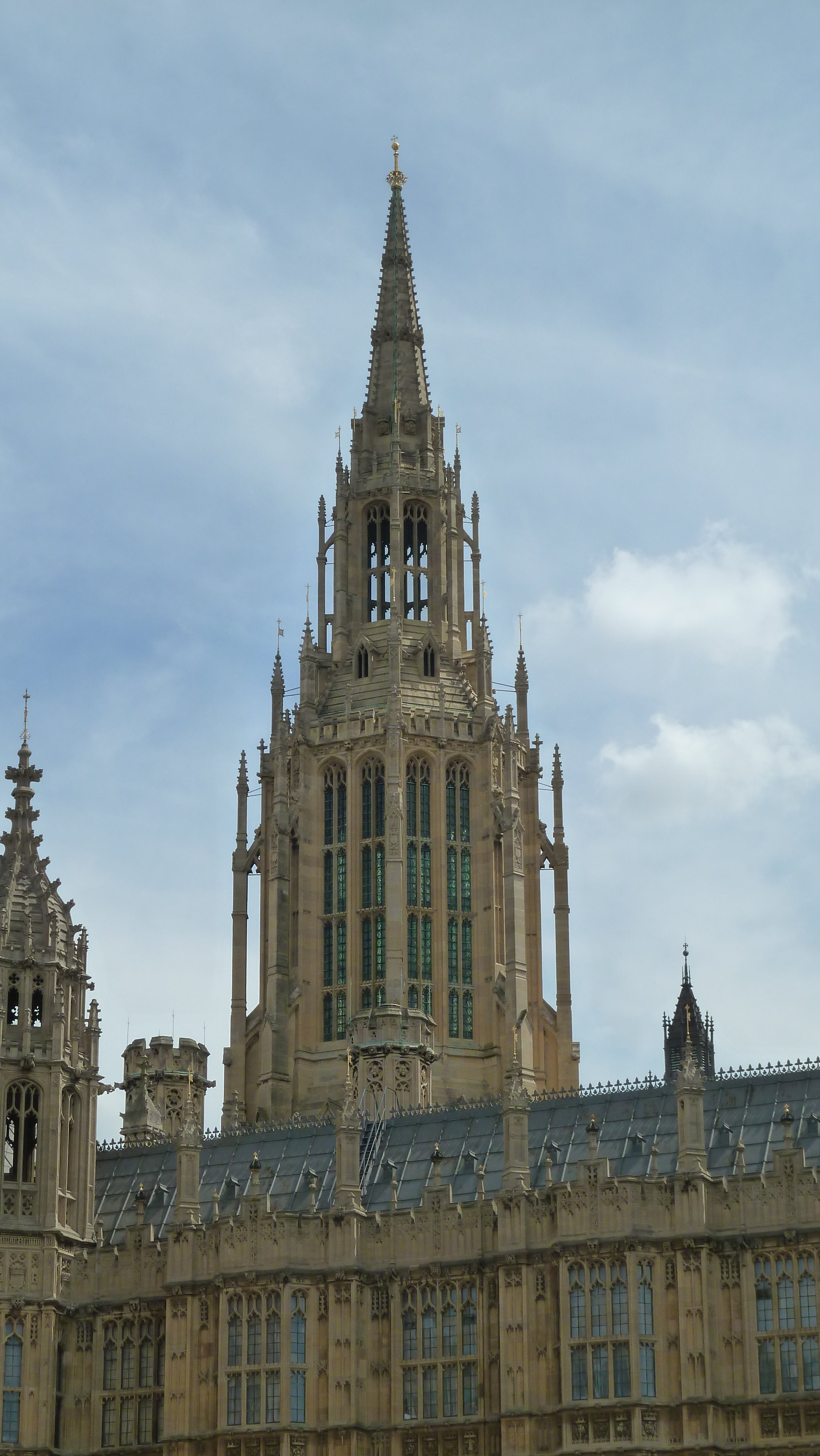
The Central Tower of the Palace of Westminster. This octagonal spire was for ventilation purposes, in the more complex system imposed by Reid on Barry, in which it was to draw air out of the Palace. The design was for aesthetic disguise of its function.

In January 1840 Reid was appointed by the committee for the House of Lords dealing with the construction of the replacement for the Houses of Parliament that had burned down six years earlier. The post was in the capacity of ventilation engineer, in effect; and with its creation there began a long series of quarrels between Reid and Charles Barry, the architect. Reid's ventilation system was adopted reluctantly by Barry in this new Palace of Westminster. Reid was engaged for five years at Westminster on this work.

Reid made a reputation by his work in Westminster. He was commissioned for an air quality survey in 1837 by the Leeds and Selby Railway in their tunnel. The steam vessels built for the Niger expedition of 1841 were fitted with ventilation systems based on Reid's Westminster model. Air was dried, filtered and passed over charcoal. The system proved a cumbersome failure. A detailed account was published by James Ormiston McWilliam.

Reid's ventilation method was also applied more fully to St. George's Hall, Liverpool, the only building, he said, in which his system was completely carried out. In this case the architect Harvey Lonsdale Elmes requested in 1841 that Reid should be involved in ventilation design.

In 1852 Reid was dismissed from his position at the Houses of Parliament. His immediate replacement was Alfred Meeson, who had been assistant to Barry. Leading Tory politicians including Benjamin Disraeli had had enough of his feud with Barry, and Lord Derby thought him a charlatan. In an extended process of settlement, Reid received substantial compensation for his dismissal.

== Royal Commission on public health ==
In 1843 Reid sat on the 13-man Royal Commission to inquire into "the state of large towns and populous districts in England and Wales with reference to the causes of disease among the inhabitants, and into the best means of promoting and securing public health". With the other medical men James Ranald Martin, Richard Owen and Lyon Playfair, he made up the dominant group on the committee.

He wrote the 1845 Report on the state of Newcastle-upon-Tyne and other towns (HMSO). His visits had included areas of great poverty and squalor, such as Sandgate. It had immediate effects. For example, his findings on Sunderland and South Shields led to the setting up in 1846 of the Sunderland Water Company. His observation on cholera, that there were no privies in the mines, was mentioned in the celebrated paper On the pathology and mode of communication of cholera of John Snow in 1849.

== In the USA ==
In 1856 Reid moved to the United States. His stature as an author on sanitation was recognised by the physician Elisha Harris writing in Reid's Ventilation in American Dwellings (1858).

Reid was brought as a professor of physiology and hygiene to the University of Wisconsin-Madison in 1859 by Henry Barnard, and then dismissed after a year. He then became government medical inspector to the sanitary commission of the United States.

On the outbreak of the American Civil War new military hospitals were erected throughout the country, and Reid was about to leave Washington on a tour of inspection when he came down with a fatal illness. He died at Washington on 5 April 1863.

== Reid's Theories ==
Reid was regarded as an expert on ventilation, but his views differed from Neil Arnott, another leader in theories of air and fever. He also regarded the susceptible individual in a different way than Southwood Smith, with more weight placed on predisposition. In a work on public hygiene by John Bell M.D. of Philadelphia for the New York Board of Councilmen, Reid's views on carbonic acid gas in old graveyards and "vitiated" air are quoted; and on "those subtle poisons called miasms" he is said to have reported that he "has detected their escape from graves more than twenty feet deep". Reid took "moving air" to be important to health, and emphasised the health hazards of "defective ventilation".

== Works ==
He was author of:

- Rudiments of Chemistry: with illustrations of the chemical phenomena of daily life (1836)
- Elements of Chemistry (1837)
- Textbook for Students of Chemistry(1839).
- Element of Chemistry and Electricity in Two Parts (1849)

In 1844 he published Illustrations of the Theory and Practice of Ventilation.
