= Niger expedition of 1841 =

British political and research expedition

The Niger expedition of 1841 was mounted by British missionary and activist groups in 1841–1842, using three British iron steam vessels to travel to Lokoja, at the confluence of the Niger River and Benue River, in what is now Nigeria. The British government backed the effort to make treaties with the native peoples, introduce Christianity and promote increased trade. The crews of the boats suffered a high mortality from disease.

== Meeting of 1 June 1840 ==
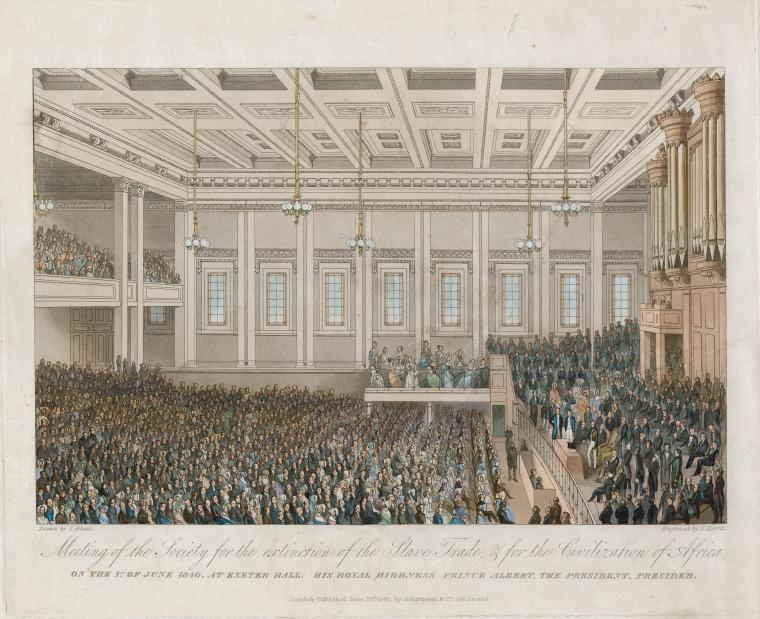
Exeter Hall meeting of 1 June 1840.

The expedition was put into motion by an Exeter Hall meeting of 1 June 1840. It was chaired by Prince Albert. The organisers were the Society for the Extinction of the Slave Trade and for the Civilization of Africa, set up in 1839 by Thomas Fowell Buxton. Buxton was promoting a grandiose "New Africa" policy, based on a series of treaties to be made in West Africa, the introduction of Christianity, and increased commerce, as set out in his book the previous year. Buxton's ideas went back at least half a century, to the Sierra Leone Company. At the time anti-slavery activists had little access to the higher reaches of the British government, and were relying on public meetings and popular agitation; Buxton was in an exceptional position.

Up to 4,000 people attended the meeting, Sir Robert Peel spoke from the stage, and Prince Albert became President of the Society. The proceedings were written up by Joseph Beldam.

The Whig government of the time, under Lord Melbourne, was more irritated than pleased by Buxton's lobbying. But it made financial moves to support the expedition. Lord Palmerston as Foreign Secretary found £50,000 to offer Spain for their claimed sovereignty of Fernando Po (now Bioko), an island in the region already home to British naval bases.

== History ==
=== Expedition ===
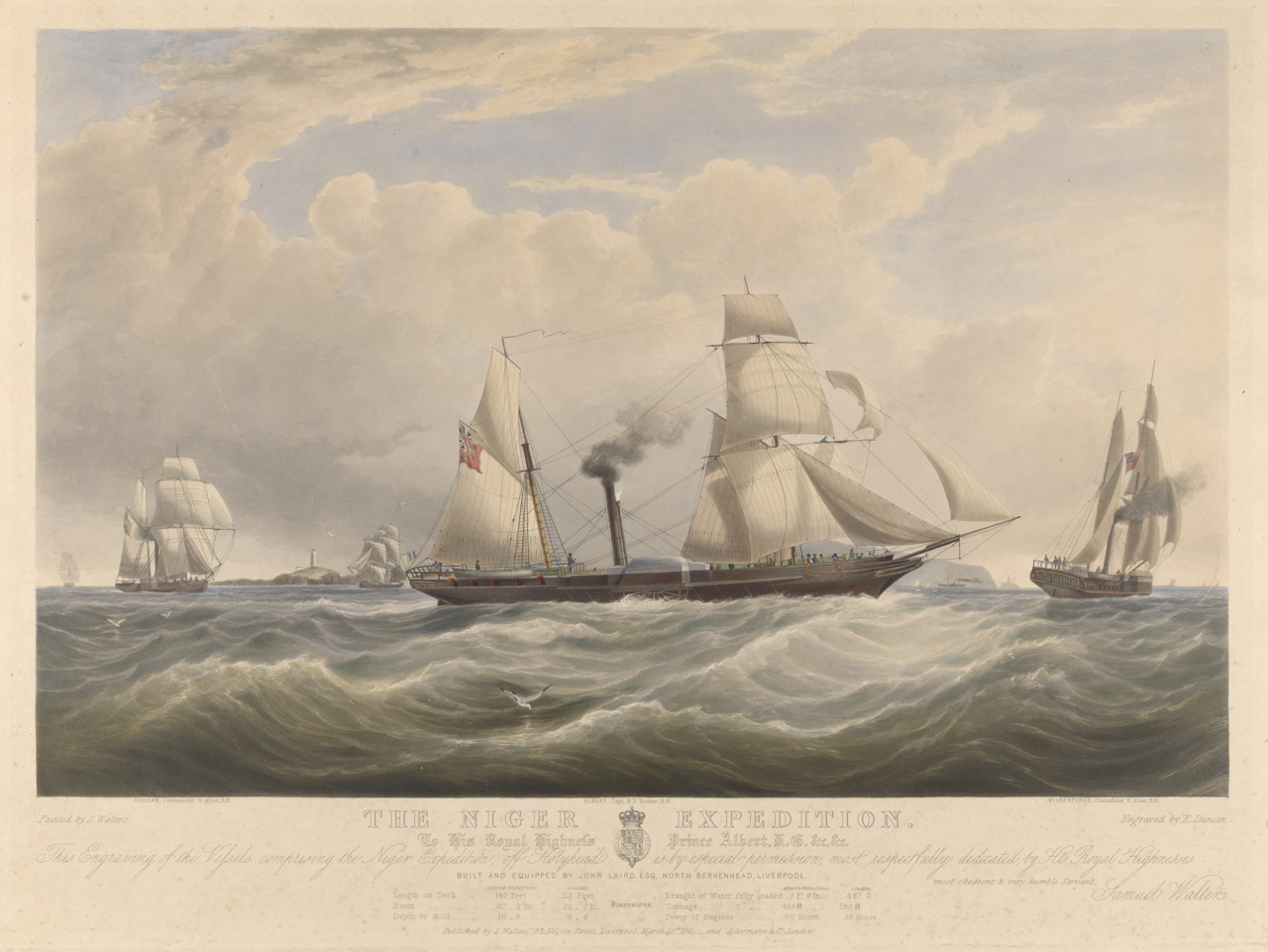
The Niger Expedition - off Holyhead, 1841. HMS Albert also shows HMS Sudan and HMS Wilberforce

Officially known as the African Colonization Expedition, it was opposed by Robert Jamieson, and Macgregor Laird. Some medical planning was done and Royal Navy surgeons carried quinine as a prophylactic against malaria. The boats also had a ventilation system, based on that of David Boswell Reid for the Palace of Westminster.

The three vessels, the steamers Albert, Wilberforce, and Soudan, were made by Laird of Liverpool. The commander was Henry Dundas Trotter in the Albert, with William Allen in the Wilberforce and Bird Allen in the Soudan. In Sierra Leone, interpreters joined the expedition. The expedition called at Cape Coast in July to drop off the Ghanaian princes Nkwantabisa and Owusu-Ansa, who had been in England since 1836.

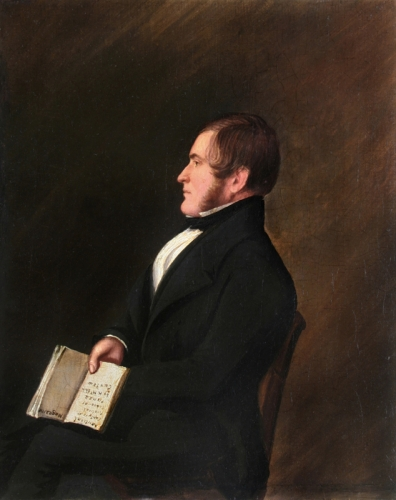
Henry Dundas Trotter, portrait around 1833.

The expedition did achieve treaties against the slave trade, signed in Aboh with Obi Ossai, and Idah. Trotter in the Albert reached Eggan and before falling ill and turning back, was on the way to Raba. The group purchased land at Lokoja, the confluence of the Niger River and Benue River, with the idea of setting up a center for missionary work and trade.

Of the 150 Europeans on the expedition, 42 died quickly. There were 130 fever cases. Members who were of African descent suffered no deaths from illness. With such high mortality, the naval commanders called the expedition off, and withdrew to the island of Fernando Po. Other figures given are 55 deaths (out of 159) of Europeans, before the return to England in 1842. The rescue operation of the expedition was led by Fernando Po governor John Beecroft.

== Participants ==
- Samuel Ajayi Crowther who wrote Journal of the Niger Expedition (1842)
- John Duncan, master-at-arms in the Albert.
- Edmund Gardiner Fishbourne, naval officer
- Louis Fraser
- James Ormiston McWilliam, chief surgeon on the Albert. From 4 October the handling of the vessel fell to him and the geologist Dr. William Stanger, the others being ill. He took it to the open sea over ten days. He published Medical History of the Niger Expedition in 1843.
- James Schön, missionary and linguist who wrote Journal of the Niger Expedition (1842)
- Thomas Richard Heywood Thomson, co-author with William Allen of A narrative of the expedition sent by Her Majesty's Government to the River Niger in 1841 (1848).
- Theodor Vogel was chief naturalist; he died in December 1841. William Jackson Hooker edited the Niger flora (1849) containing his collecting notes, with works by Philip Barker Webb, Joseph Dalton Hooker, and George Bentham. John Ansell was Vogel's assistant; he discovered on Fernando Po a specimen of Ansellia africana or Leopard Orchid, and the genus (of one species) was later named after him.

== Aftermath ==
Charles Dickens commented on this expedition, particularly by means of the character of Mrs. Jellyby in Bleak House.

A group of Baptist missionaries on Fernando Po were waiting for a rendezvous with the expedition, which was never made. They remained on the island group and evangelised.
