= Henry Dundas Trotter =

British naval officer (1802–1859)

Henry Dundas Trotter (19 September 1802 – 14 July 1859) was a Scottish officer of the Royal Navy, who reached the rank of rear-admiral.

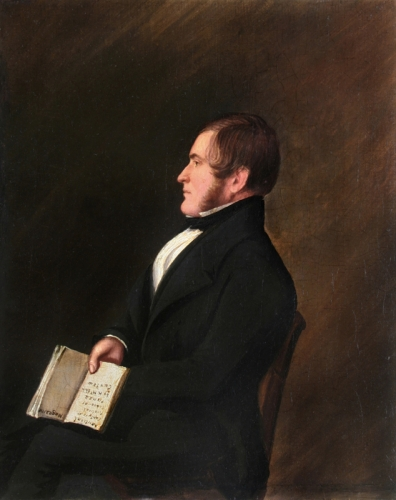
Henry Dundas Trotter, portrait around 1833

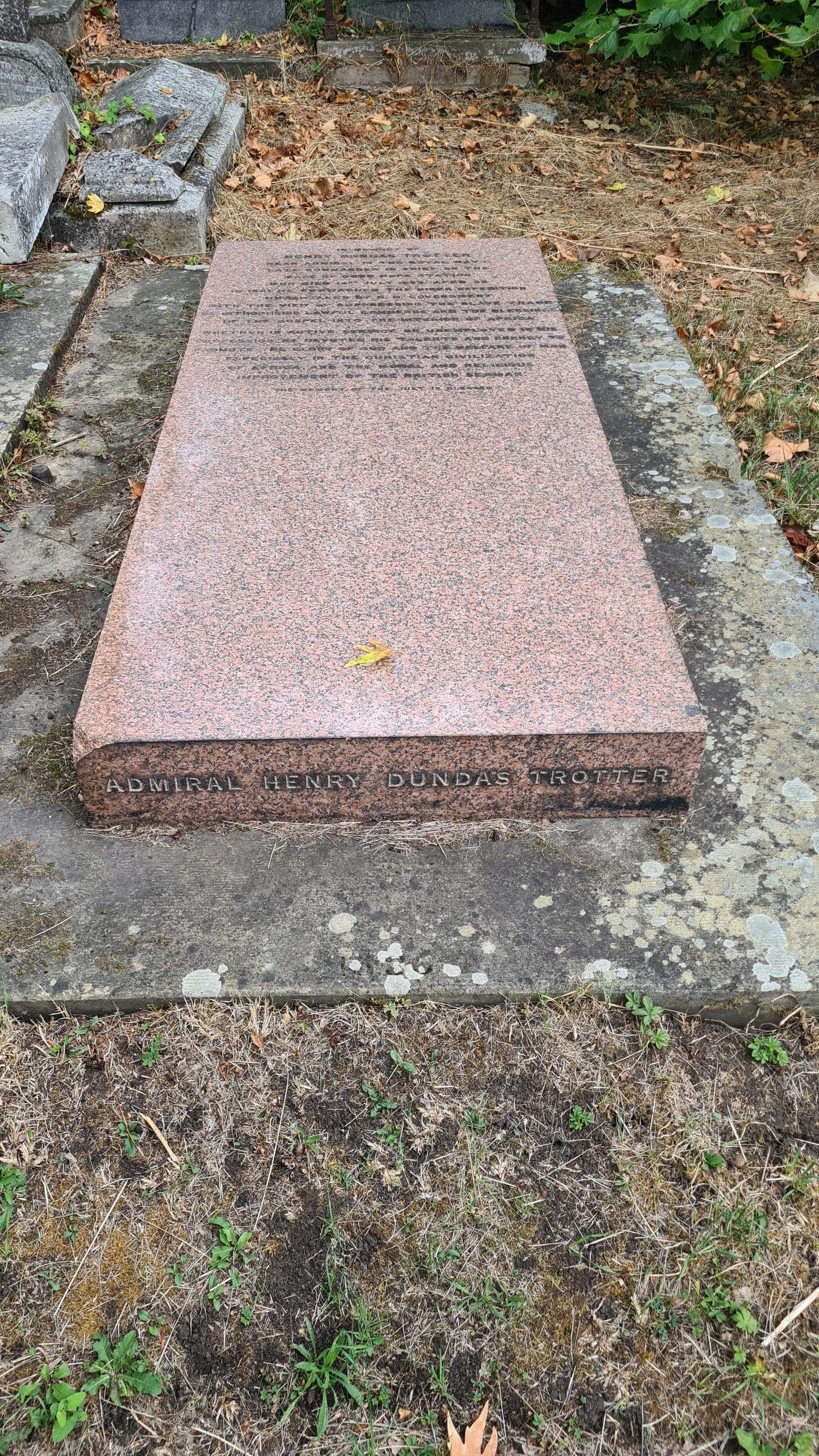
Tomb of Henry Dundas Trotter at Kensal Green Cemetery, London

== Early life ==
The third son of Alexander Trotter of Dreghorn, near Edinburgh, he was born on 19 September 1802. He entered the Royal Naval College at Portsmouth in 1815.

== Career ==
In February 1818 joined the Ister at Leith. From her in May he was sent to the Eden of 26 guns, going out to the East Indies, and in her during 1819 taking part in the expedition against the pirates of the Persian Gulf, under Captain Francis Augustus Collier. In March 1821 he was moved to the Leander, flagship of Sir Henry Blackwood, by whom he was appointed acting lieutenant. On arriving in England the commission was confirmed, dating from 9 January 1823. He was then appointed to the Hussar, going out to the West Indies, and was reported by her captain, George Harris, for his conduct in the capture of pirates at the Isle of Pines. He afterwards served in the Bellette and Rattlesnake, and on 20 February 1826 was made commander into the Britomart sloop.

In July 1830 he commissioned the Curlew for service on the west coast of Africa, where he was for the most part senior officer, the commander-in-chief remaining at the Cape of Good Hope. In May 1833, at Prince's Island in the Gulf of Guinea, he had intelligence of an act of piracy committed on an American brig, the Mexican, the previous September, by a large schooner identified as the Panda, a Spanish slaver from Havana, and then on the coast. It was commanded by Pedro Gibert. On 4 June he seized the Panda in the Nazareth River, but the crew escaped to the shore. After a hunt of several months, he succeeded in capturing most of them, and took possession of the Esperanza, a Portuguese schooner, which had been assisting the fugitives. The prisoners and the Esperanza he took to England. The prisoners were sent over to Salem, Massachusetts; the brig they had plundered was then in harbour, and most of them were hanged; Trotter received the thanks of the American government. Against the Esperanza there was no legal evidence; her owners instituted a prosecution against Trotter, and Lord Palmerston, then foreign secretary, agreed that the schooner should be returned to Lisbon. Trotter was called on to fit her out at his own expense. At Plymouth, however, the captains of the ships there sent parties of men who completed her refit free of cost to Trotter; and the Admiralty promoted him to post rank on 16 September 1835.

For a few months in 1838 Trotter was flag-captain to Sir Philip Durham at Portsmouth. In 1840 he was appointed captain of the Albert steamer, commander of the Niger expedition of 1841, and chief of the commission authorised to conclude treaties of commerce with the local rulers. The squadron of three small steamers sailed from England in May 1841, and entered the Niger River on 13 August. In less than three weeks the other two vessels were incapacitated by fever, and obliged to return (see William Allen. Trotter in the Albert struggled on as far as Egga, where, on 3 October, he was prostrated by the fever; and, as the greater part of his ship's company was also down with it, he was obliged to turn back. He succeeded, however, in establishing some treaties.

The admiralty promoted all the junior officers of the expedition, and in the following years offered Trotter the governorship of New Zealand in 1843, the command of an Arctic expedition in 1844, and the command of the Indian Navy in 1846. The state of his health, however, led him to refuse these offers, and it was not until the outbreak of the Crimean War that he accepted employment. He was then appointed commodore at the Cape of Good Hope, a post which he held for three years, during which time he succeeded in establishing the Cape Town Sailors' Home.

On 19 March 1857 Trotter became a rear-admiral on the retired list.

== Later life ==
He died suddenly in London on 14 July 1859, and was buried in Kensal Green Cemetery.

== Personal life ==
He married, in November 1835, Charlotte, second daughter of Major-General James Pringle of the East India Company's service.

== See also ==
- O'Byrne, William Richard (1849). "Trotter, Henry Dundas" . A Naval Biographical Dictionary . John Murray – via Wikisource.
