= Hugo Arnot =

Scottish advocate, writer and campaigner (1749-1786)

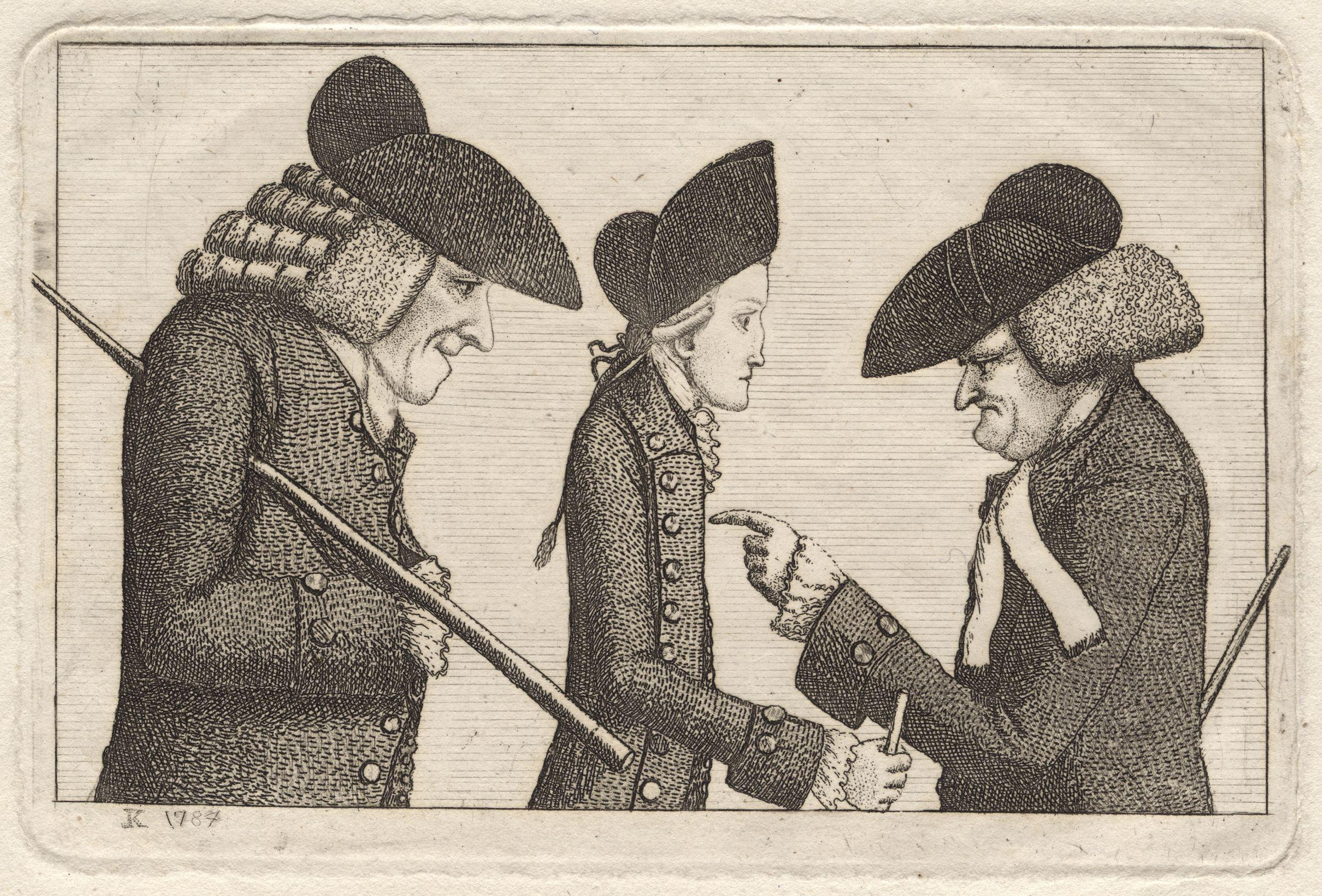
Henry Lord Kames, Hugo Arnot, and James Lord Monboddo. Etching by John Kay, 1784.

Hugo Arnot of Balcormo (8 December 1749 – 20 November 1786) was a Scottish advocate, writer, and campaigner.

He was described as a "natural curiosity": being "of great height, but sadly deficient in breadth".

== Life ==
Arnot was born Hugo Pollock on 8 December 1749 in Leith, where his father was a merchant and ship-owner. He adopted his mother's maiden name, Arnot, after succeeding to her property of Balcormo in Fife (north of Pittenweem). He was trained as a lawyer and became a member of the Faculty of Advocates on 5 December 1772. From at least 1773 until his death he lived on Princes Street, where he was one of its first residents.

In 1779 he published his History of Edinburgh with a second issue with added illustrations later in the year, a second edition appeared in 1788 and a third in 1816. Arnot quoted from manuscript sources in Edinburgh City Archives and the National Records of Scotland including a household book of James IV and the accounts of Robert Jousie. In 1785 he published a Collection of Celebrated Criminal Trials in Scotland. Both works were pirated in Ireland.

He became prematurely aged from asthma, and his irritability, caustic language, and a reluctance to accept cases where the potential customer in his opinion was in the wrong, hindered his success as an advocate. Many anecdotes are told of his eccentricity. He wrote many papers on local politics, opposing local taxation and road tolls, mainly hitting the poorer part of the population, as means for funding road projects. He is said to have held up for ten years the erection of the city's South Bridge.

Arnot died 20 November 1786, and left eight children. He is buried in South Leith Parish Churchyard in an enclosure which he had built to contain him in the final month of his life.

His daughter Christian Arnot married Dr Peter Reid and was mother to David Boswell Reid.

== Publications ==
- An Essay on Nothing (1776)
- History of Edinburgh (1779)
- A Collection of Celebrated Criminal Trials (1785)

== General opinions ==
In his texts, Arnot was sharp and outspoken, which was met with mixed feelings. In his Collection of Celebrated Criminal Trials in Scotland, he clearly comments on what he considered as unjust decisions, using terms such as despotism. Here, for example, is his Enlightenment view of 'progress' being made in the sentencing of criminals, while at the same implying the need to reform the criminal justice of his time.

We do not think it possible, that a nation can attain to improvement in science, to refinement of taste, and in manners, without, at the same time, acquiring a refinement in their ideas of justice, and feelings of humanity. The codes of the criminal laws of most nations (our own in no ways excepted) are exceedingly barbarous. This is owing to their having been compiled when the respective nations were sunk in barbarity, were subjected to an absolute government, or were blinded with religious bigotry. But, although scarce any attention has been paid to the state of criminal jurisprudence, by revising the penal statutes; yet, with the increasing mildness of manners, the officers of the law have declined to raise prosecutions for inflicting those rigorous punishments.

In 1777 Arnot published a "fanciful metaphysical treatise", called an 'Essay on Nothing,' which originally was read before the debating club called the Speculative Society, and made himself unpopular by his sarcasms. However, he was later a regular participant in church activities, and his contributions to the Society were recognised by the Edinburgh magistrates, who gave him the freedom of the city.

Arnot was a favourite subject with John Kay, the Edinburgh caricaturist, who took full advantage of the extreme slimness of his figure.
