= Pedro Gilbert =

Spanish pirate and slave trader (1797–1835)

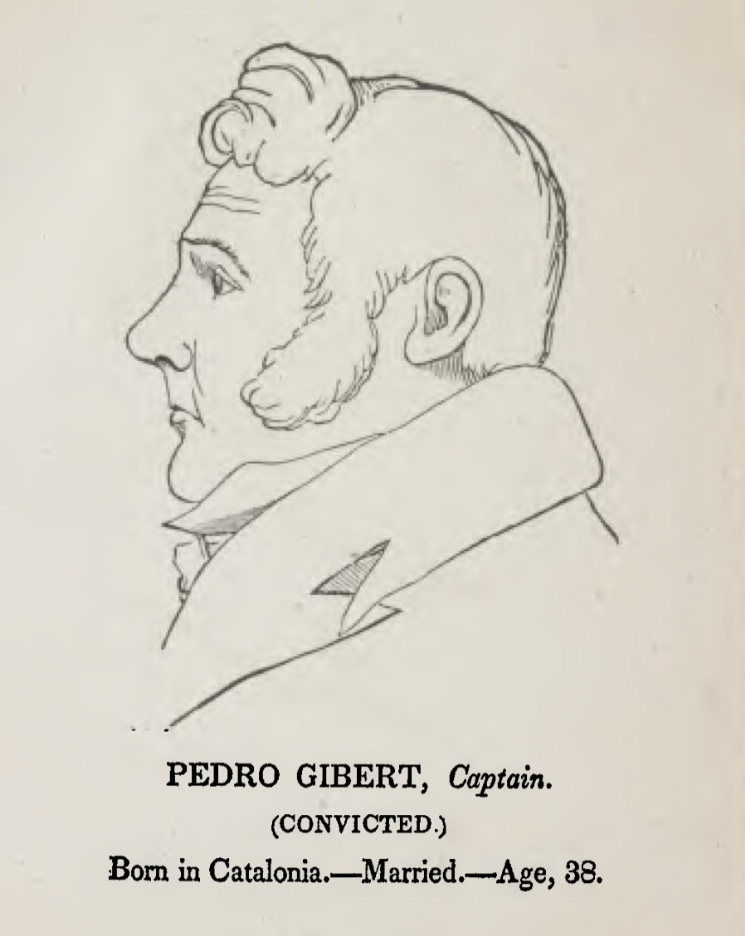
- Likeness made of Gilbert during his trial before the U.S. Circuit Court
- Born: c. 1797; Catalonia, Spain
- Died: June 11, 1835 (aged 38); Boston, Massachusetts, United States
- Cause of death: Execution by hanging
- Piratical career
- Nickname: Don Pedro Gibert
- Type: Pirate, Privateer
- Years active: 1832-1834
- Rank: Captain
- Base of operations: Caribbean

Pedro Gilbert (c. 1797 – June 11, 1835) was a Spanish pirate, privateer and slave trader. At the time of his execution, he was one of the few remaining pirates continuing to raid shipping on the Atlantic coast.

== Biography ==
A former privateer in the service of the Viceroyalty of New Granada, Gilbert began raiding American merchant vessels off the eastern coast of Florida with his schooner, the Panda in early 1832. On September 21, 1832, off the coast of what is now Stuart, Florida, Gilbert chased then boarded the Mexican, an American brig bound from Salem to Rio de Janeiro carrying $20,000 in silver. Following the crew's surrender, a crew member asked Gilbert what was to be done with their captives, to which the pirate captain reportedly remarked, "Dead cats don't mew. You know what to do." Gilbert was also a slave trader who made several voyages to Africa to pick up slaves.

"This vessel was fashioned, at the will of avarice, for the aid of cruelty and injustice; it was an African slaver."

Locking the crew inside the forecastle, Gilbert's crew ransacked the ship, looting the Mexican's stores. Slashing the rigging and sails, the pirates filled the ship's galley with combustibles and set the ship afire with the crew trapped inside. However, the crew managed to break out after an hour and eventually doused the fire, although they continued to let enough smoke billow until the pirates were out of sight. After six weeks at sea, the crew finally made it back to Salem, where they were able to report the incident. Gilbert was eventually captured in West Africa two years later when his ship was sunk in a naval engagement with the British brig sloop HMS Curlew, commanded by Henry Dundas Trotter. Extradited to the United States, he was tried with 11 of his crewmen in Boston, Massachusetts. All pleaded not guilty, albeit one of the crewmen, Manuel Delgado, committed suicide in jail. Seven of them, including Gilbert, were found guilty and received mandatory death sentences. Five of them: Pedro Gilbert, Maneul Boyga, Manuel Castillo, Angel Garcia, and Juan Montenegro, were executed on June 11, 1835. Another, Francisco Ruiz, was hanged on September 18, 1835, after initially receiving a stay of execution. The remaining convict, Bernardo de Soto, the first mate and owner of the Panda, was pardoned by President Andrew Jackson on July 6, 1835. There had been public pressure to spare his life since he'd helped save the lives of American passengers of a sunken ship several years back.

== Memorial ==
A sandbar off Stuart which the pirates often used to lure unsuspecting ships is marked on nautical charts as "Gilbert's Bar."
