= William Allen (Royal Navy officer) =

British Royal Navy officer (1792–1864)

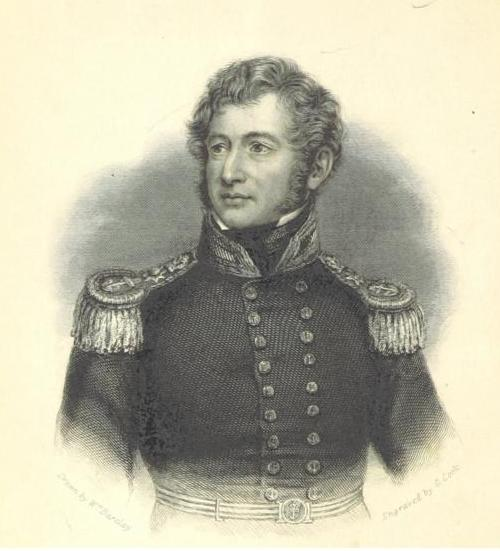
William Allen, 1848 engraving.

Rear-Admiral William Allen FRS (25 November 1792 – 23 January 1864) was an English naval officer and explorer.

== Biography ==
Allen was born in Weymouth in November 1792. He entered the navy as a volunteer in 1805, and, as midshipman, was present at the passage of the Dardanelles in 1807. He was on board the 36-gun HMS Leda in August 1811 for the capture of Java, and in June 1813 during the successful attack on the pirate base at Sambas, Borneo.

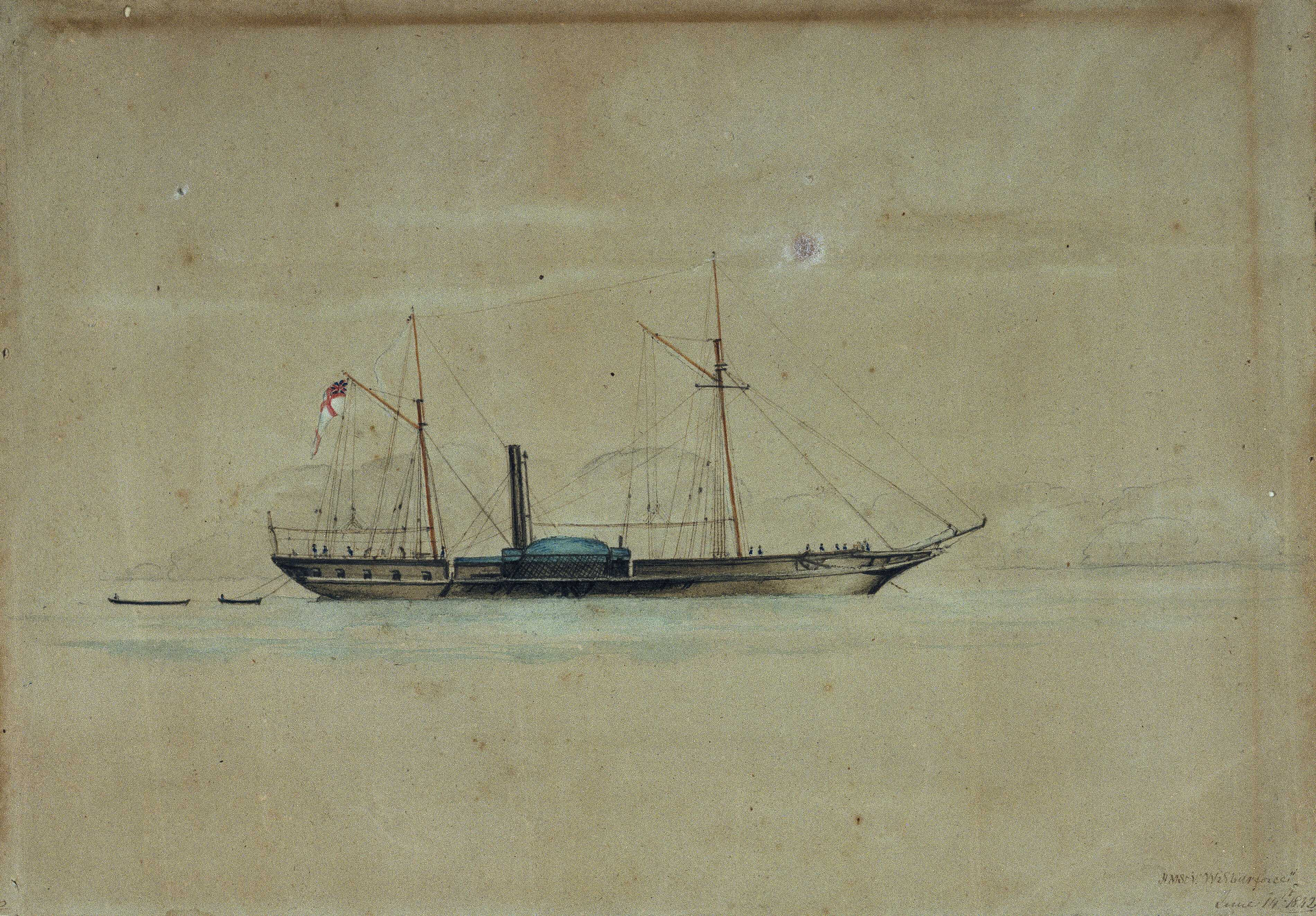
HMS Wilberforce on 14 June 1842

Allen was promoted lieutenant in 1815, commander 1836, and captain 1842. He look part in the Niger expedition of Richard Lander and Oldfield, 1832; but is best known as having commanded the steamer HMS Wilberforce in the elaborately equipped but disastrous Niger expedition of 1841 under Captain Henry Totter. Though Allen cannot be blamed for any of the misfortunes of this expedition, he was on his return placed on half-pay, and retired from the service, as rear-admiral, in 1862, dying at Weymouth 23 January 1864.

Allen collected the type specimen of Allen's gallinule (a small waterbird) near the River Niger. He was a Fellow of the Royal Society.

== Works ==
In 1848, Allen with Thomas Richard Heywood Thomson published, in two volumes as A Narrative of the Expedition sent by H.M.'s Government to the River Niger in 1841. In 1849 he travelled through Syria and Palestine, and published the results in two volumes (1855) as The Dead Sea, a New Route to India, with other Fragments and Gleanings in the East, in which he advocated the construction of a canal between the Mediterranean and Red Sea by the Jordan Valley and Dead Sea, and compared that route with the proposed Suez Canal.

In 1846, Allen published a pamphlet on Mutual Improvement, advocating the institution of good-conduct prizes to be awarded by ballot by the community divided for the purpose into small groups; and in 1849 a Plan for the immediate Extinction of the Slave Trade, for the Relief of the West India Colonies, and for the Diffusion of Civilisation and Christianity in Africa by the co-operation of Mammon with Philanthropy, a scheme of compulsory "apprenticeship" or "temporary bondage". Allen also brought out two volumes of Picturesque Views on Ascension Island (1835) and the River Niger (1840), with papers in the Journal of the Royal Geographical Society, vols. vii. viii. xiii. and xxiii. Some of his landscape paintings were exhibited at the Royal Academy, from 1828 to 1847.
