= T. R. H. Thomson =

English explorer and naturalist

Thomas Richard Heywood Thomson (1813–1876) was an English explorer and naturalist. He took part in the Niger expedition of 1841.

He originally described the Allen's gallinule.

== Works ==
- Captain William Allen & T. R. H. Thomson 1848: A narrative of the expedition sent by Her Majesty's government to the river Niger, in 1841, under the command of Capt. H. D. Trotter, R.N.. 2 vols. – Richard Bentley, Lontoo.
- T. R. H. Thomson 1854: Observations on the Reported Incompetency of the "Gins" or Aboriginal Females of New Holland, to Procreate with a Native Male after Having Borne Half-Caste Children to a European or White. Journal of the Ethnological Society of London (1848–1856), Vol. 3, 1854 (1854), ss. 243–246
