= Sunset shell =

Sunset shell is a common name for several bivalves with brightly colored shells and may refer to:

- Tellina radiata
- Several genera in the family Psammobiidae, including:
  - Gari
  - Soletellina
