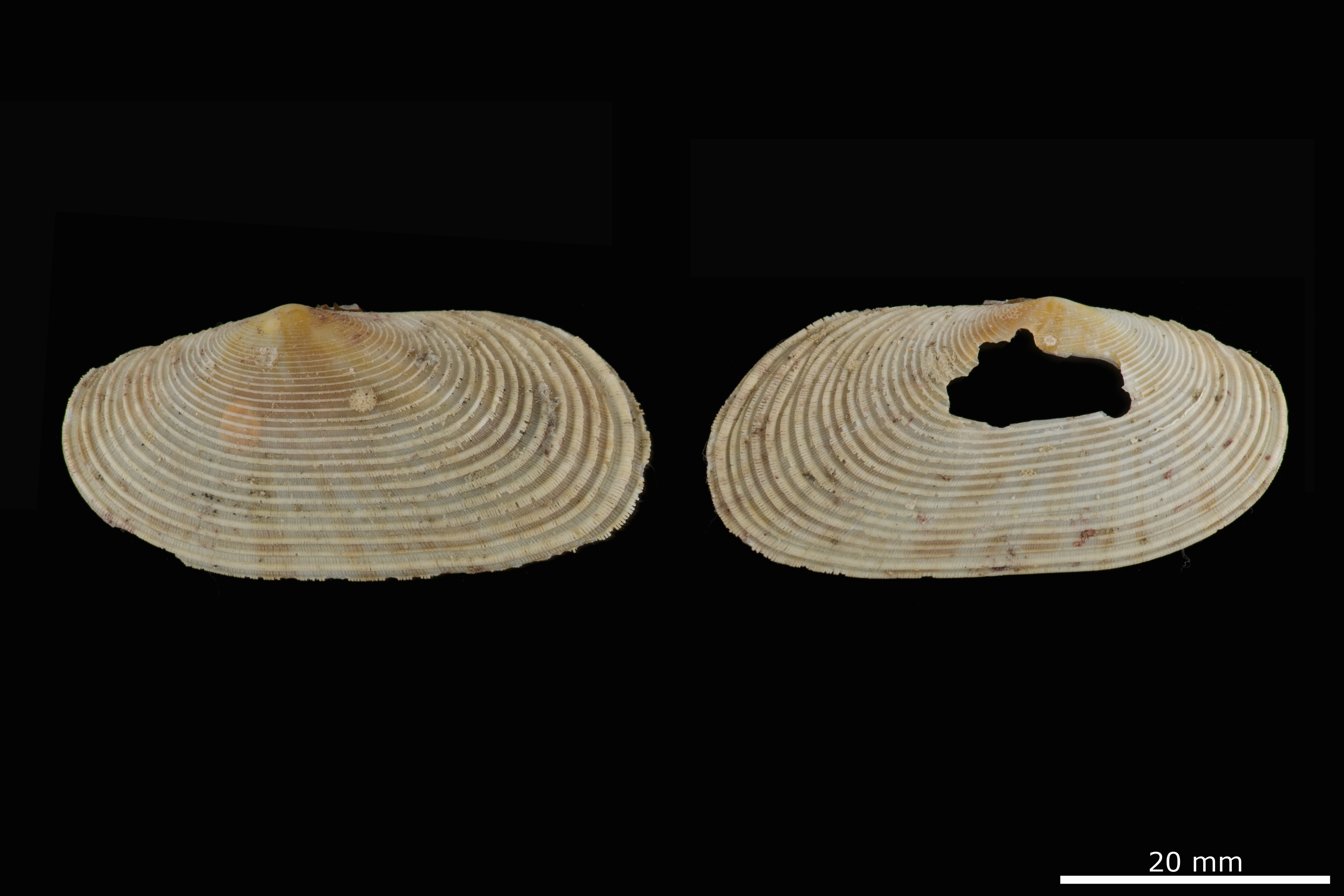
- Holotype of Gari galatheae external view
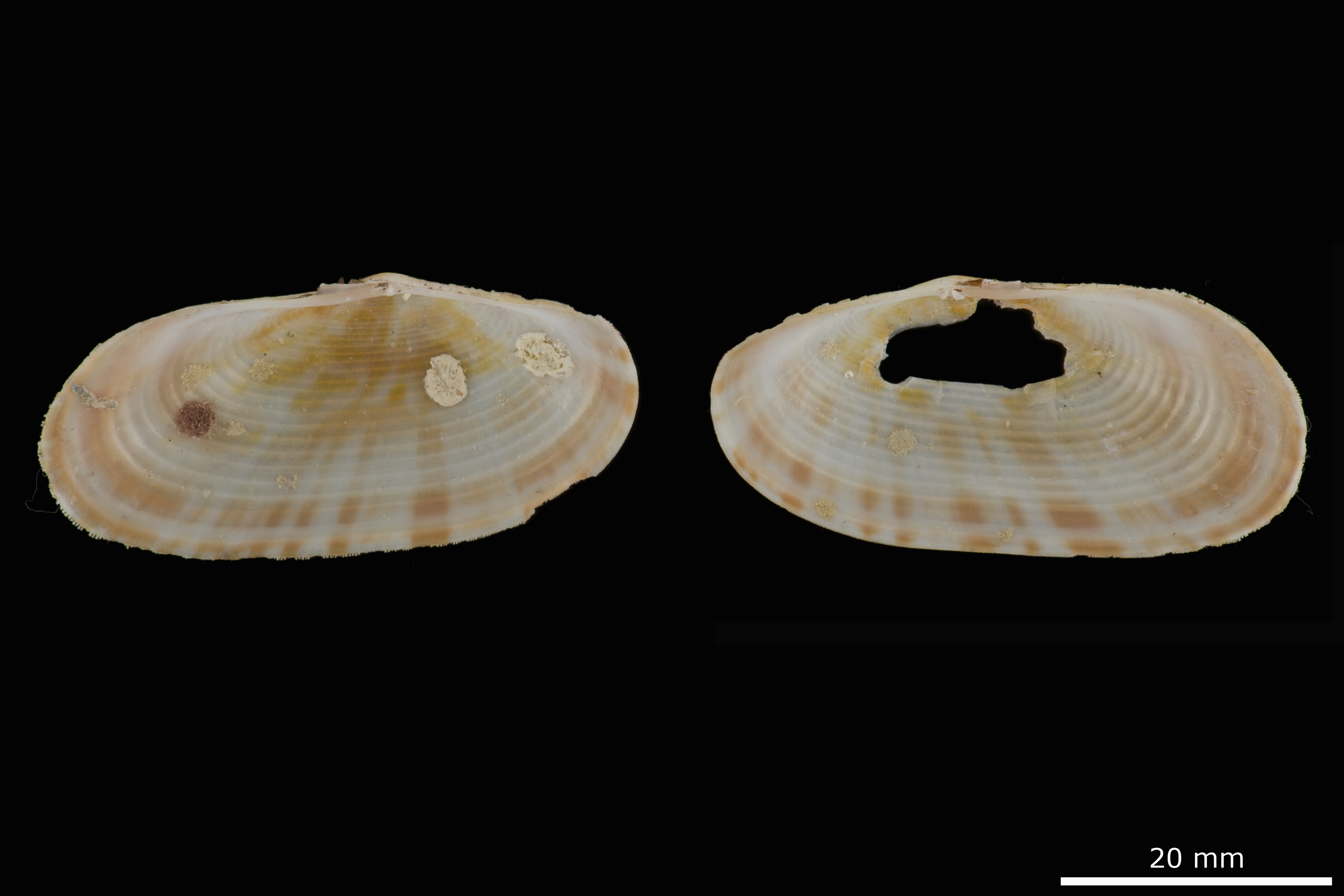
- Holotype of Gari galatheae internal view

Scientific classification
- Kingdom: Animalia
- Phylum: Mollusca
- Class: Bivalvia
- Order: Cardiida
- Superfamily: Tellinoidea
- Family: Psammobiidae
- Genus: Gari
- Species: G. galatheae

Binomial name
- Gari galatheae (A. W. B. Powell, 1958)

Synonyms
- Dysmea galatheae (A. W. B. Powell, 1958); Dysmea (Kermadysmea) galatheae (A. W. B. Powell, 1958); Kermadysmea galatheae A. W. B. Powell, 1958; Gari (Kermadysmea) galatheae (A. W. B. Powell, 1958)

= Gari galatheae =

Species of bivalve

Gari galatheae is a bivalve mollusc of the family Psammobiidae. First described as Kermadysmea galatheae by A. W. B. Powell in 1958 from specimens found in the Kermadec Islands, the species is known to live across the Pacific and Indian oceans.

== Description ==
In the original description, Powell described the genus as below:

Shell, large, thin, fragile, elongate-rectangularly ovate, pale pinkish-buff irregularly radially rayed with salmon-pink. Dorsal margin slightly curved, with the umbones situated a little nearer to the anterior end which is narrowly rounded with the point of greatest convexity above middle height. Posterior end slightly gaping and flexed with a bias to the left, broadly rounded with the point of greatest convexity below middle height. Ventral margin straight. Sculpture of numerous rounded concentric ribs crossed by a dense surface pattern of linear-spaced radial threads which curve over the concentric ribs, giving a dense comb-like effect. Interior of shell smooth, only slightly corrugated by the external ridges. Posterior muscle scar large almost twice the size of the anterior one. Pallial sinus deep, reaching the middle of the shell, broad non tapered with a bluntly rounded apex and set at about 30° to the ventral margin. Ventral margin smooth within but densely cusped externally by the radial threads which slightly overhang the margin. Hinge plate narrow, without laterals. Right valve with two divergent cardinals, posterior one the stronger. Left valve with two cardinals, a heavy triangulate one immediately below the umbo and a thin short lamellate one parallel with the hinge plate and situated posteriorly. Nymph broad and short extending above the dorsal margin. Lunule very long and narrow.

The holotype has a height of 21 mm (0.83 in), length of 44 mm (1.7 in), and a diameter of 11.7 mm (0.46 in). The species has a maximum length of 50 mm (2.0 in).

The species can be distinguished from other member of Gari due to being more elongated and solid, and due to the presence of lamellae of microscopic recurved riblets over the entire outer surface of both shell valves.

== Taxonomy ==
The species was first described by A. W. B. Powell in 1958 as the type species of a new genus, Kermadysmea, which he split from Gari due to morphological differences of the posterior cardinal. The holotype was collected in 1952 off the coast of Raoul Island in the Kermadec Islands during the Danish Galathea, and is held by the Natural History Museum of Denmark. In 1969, Myra Keen recombined Kermadysmea as a subgenus of Gari, which was recombined again by Tadashige Habe in 1977 as a subgenus of Dysmea. Keen's placement was restored in 1993 by R. C. Willan, leading to the currently accepted scientific name, Gari galatheae.

== Distribution and habitat ==
The species has a wide distribution, found across the Indian Ocean and Pacific Ocean in locations such as the Kermadec Islands, Réunion, the Philippines and the Ryukyu Islands. Specimens of the species tend to be found in coarse shell sand and gravel, predominantly from a depth ranging between 75–215 m (246–705 ft).
