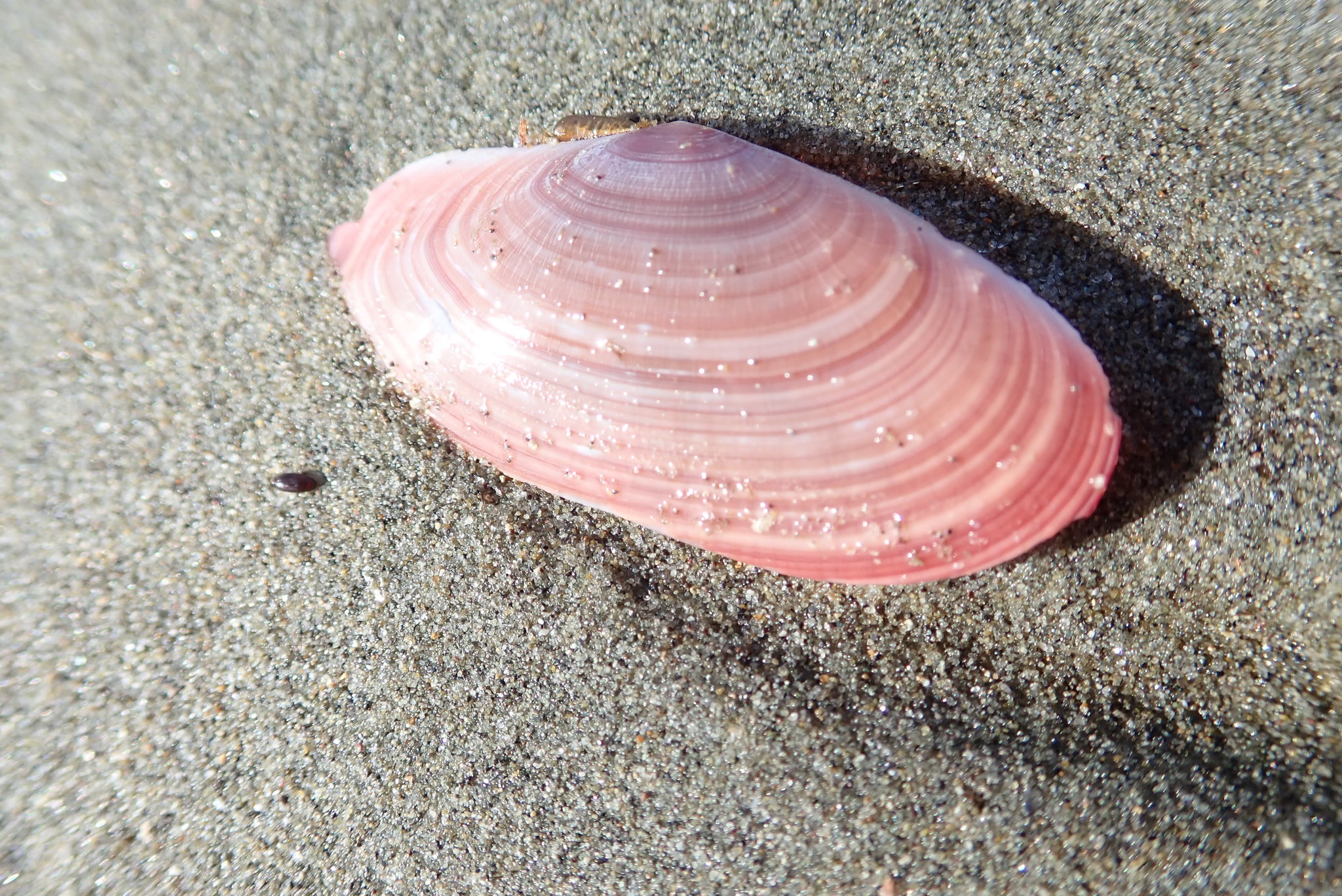

Scientific classification
- Kingdom: Animalia
- Phylum: Mollusca
- Class: Bivalvia
- Order: Cardiida
- Superfamily: Tellinoidea
- Family: Psammobiidae
- Genus: Gari
- Species: G. lineolata

Binomial name
- Gari lineolata (Gray, 1835)

= Gari lineolata =

Species of bivalve

Gari lineolata, or the pink sunset shell, is a bivalve mollusc of the family Psammobiidae.
