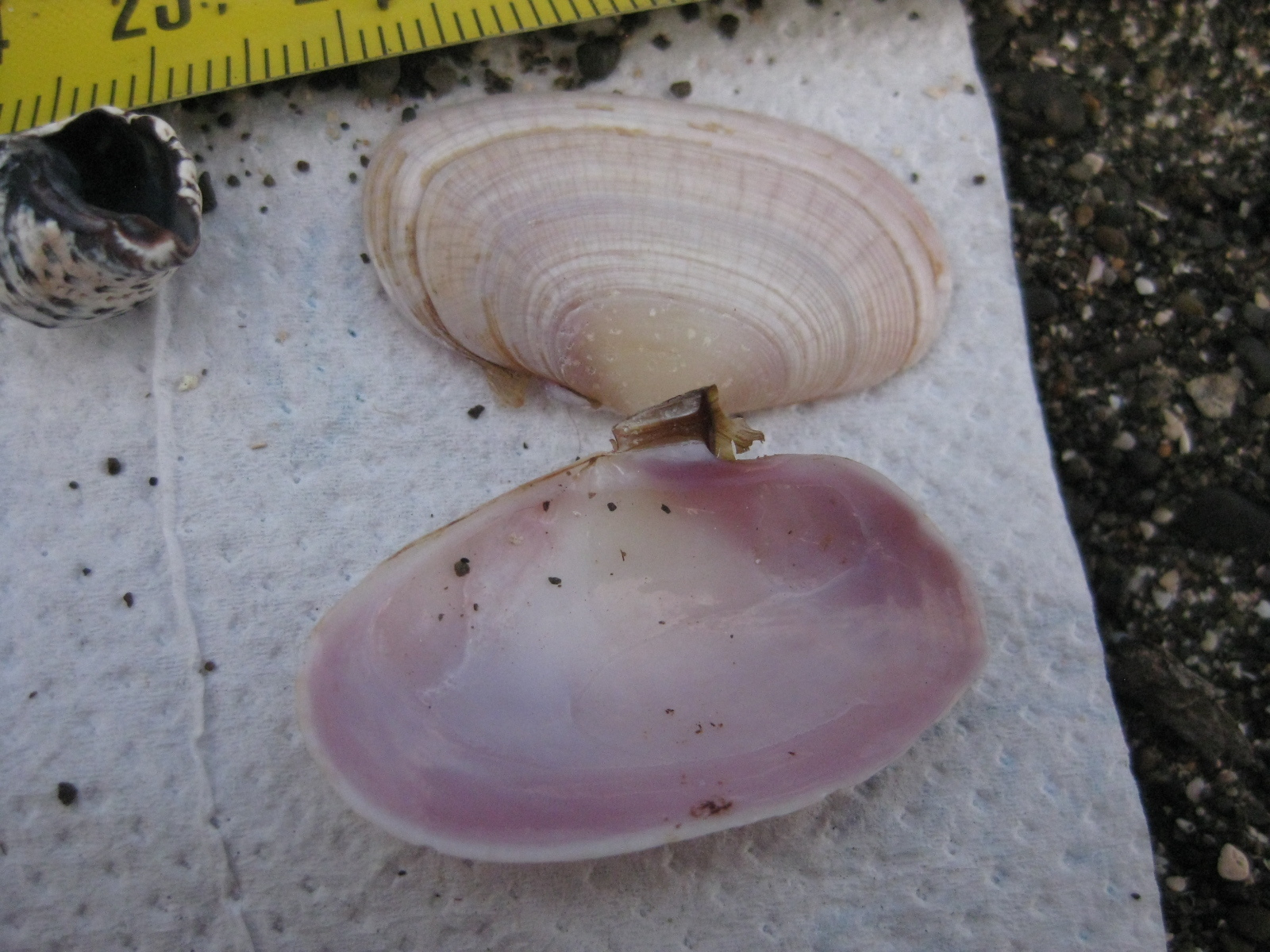

Scientific classification
- Kingdom: Animalia
- Phylum: Mollusca
- Class: Bivalvia
- Order: Cardiida
- Superfamily: Tellinoidea
- Family: Psammobiidae
- Genus: Gari
- Species: G. stangeri

Binomial name
- Gari stangeri (Gray, 1843)

Synonyms
- Gari (Gobraeus) stangeri (Gray, 1843); Psammobia kuesteri Philippi, 1845; Psammobia neozelanica Hutton, 1884; Psammobia stangeri Gray, 1843; Psammobia tristis Deshayes, 1855; Psammobia zelandica Deshayes, 1855

= Gari stangeri =

Species of bivalve

Gari stangeri, or the purple sunset shell, is a bivalve mollusc of the family Psammobiidae. It was first described by John Edward Gray using specimens collected by William Stanger.

== Description ==
It has a pink shell with radiating rings. The inside appears to be pink with a diffuse colour of white, and a white rim. The shell is oblong and around 2" in length when mature.

== Etymology ==
The generic name Gari is of uncertain etymology, with none listed in the original description. It is an ancient Greek hapax legomenon for a city in northern Afghanistan. The gender is normally considered feminine as it was originally combined with Gari papyracea.

Stangeri was named for William Stanger (surveyor).
