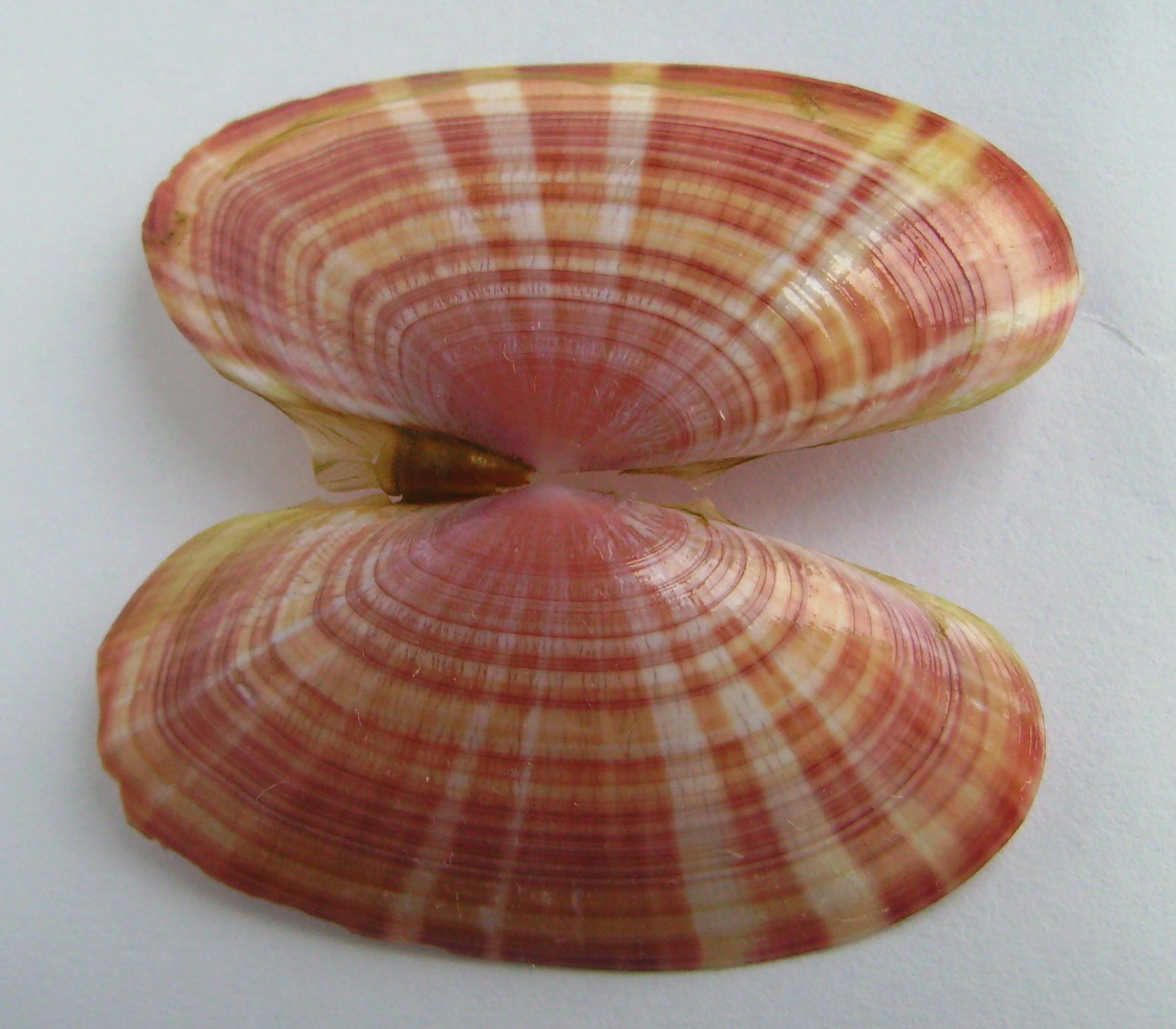
- Gari convexa external view
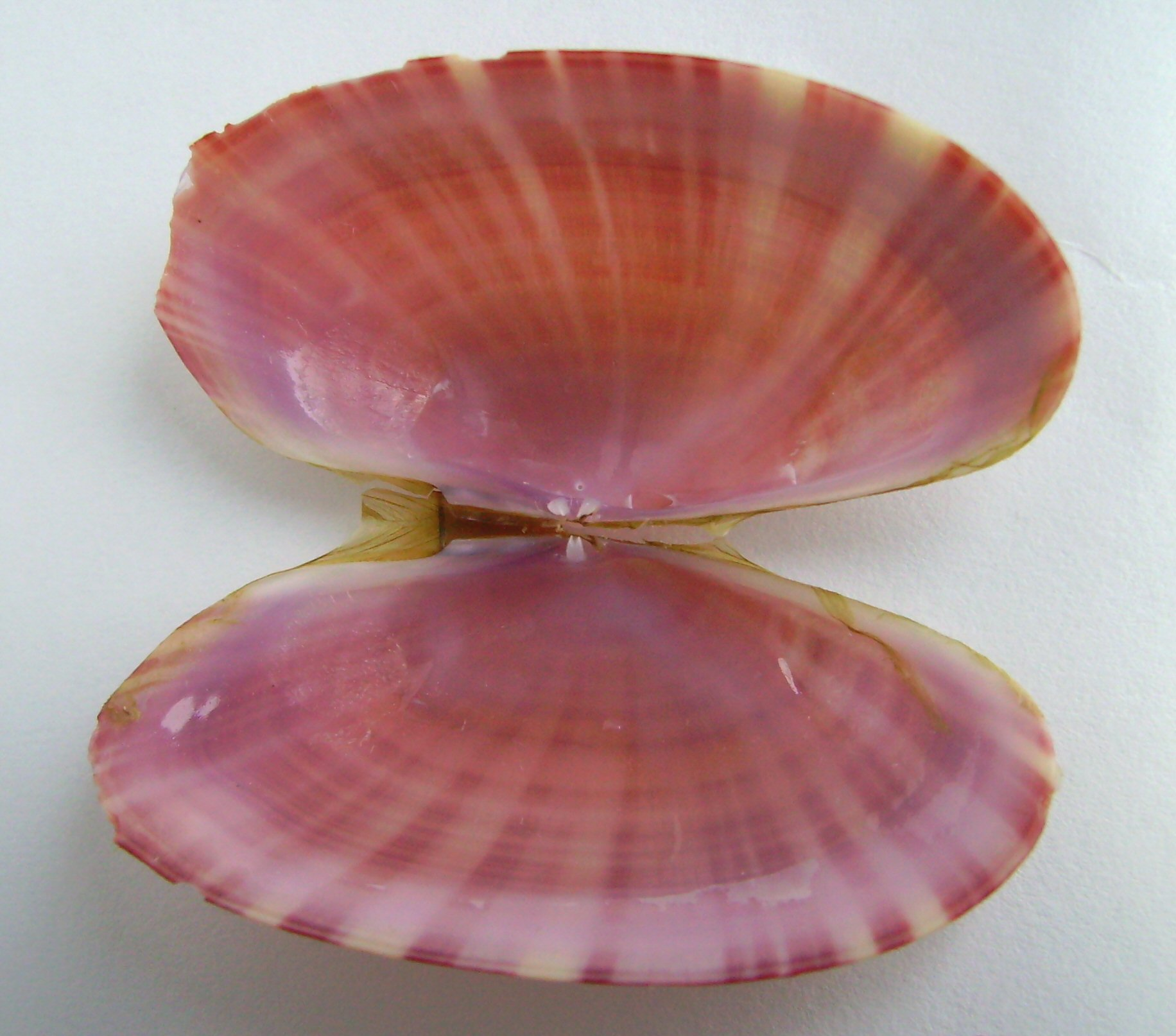
- Gari convexa internal view

Scientific classification
- Kingdom: Animalia
- Phylum: Mollusca
- Class: Bivalvia
- Order: Cardiida
- Superfamily: Tellinoidea
- Family: Psammobiidae
- Genus: Gari
- Species: G. convexa

Binomial name
- Gari convexa Reeve, 1857

= Gari convexa =

Species of bivalve

Gari convexa is a bivalve mollusc of the family Psammobiidae.
