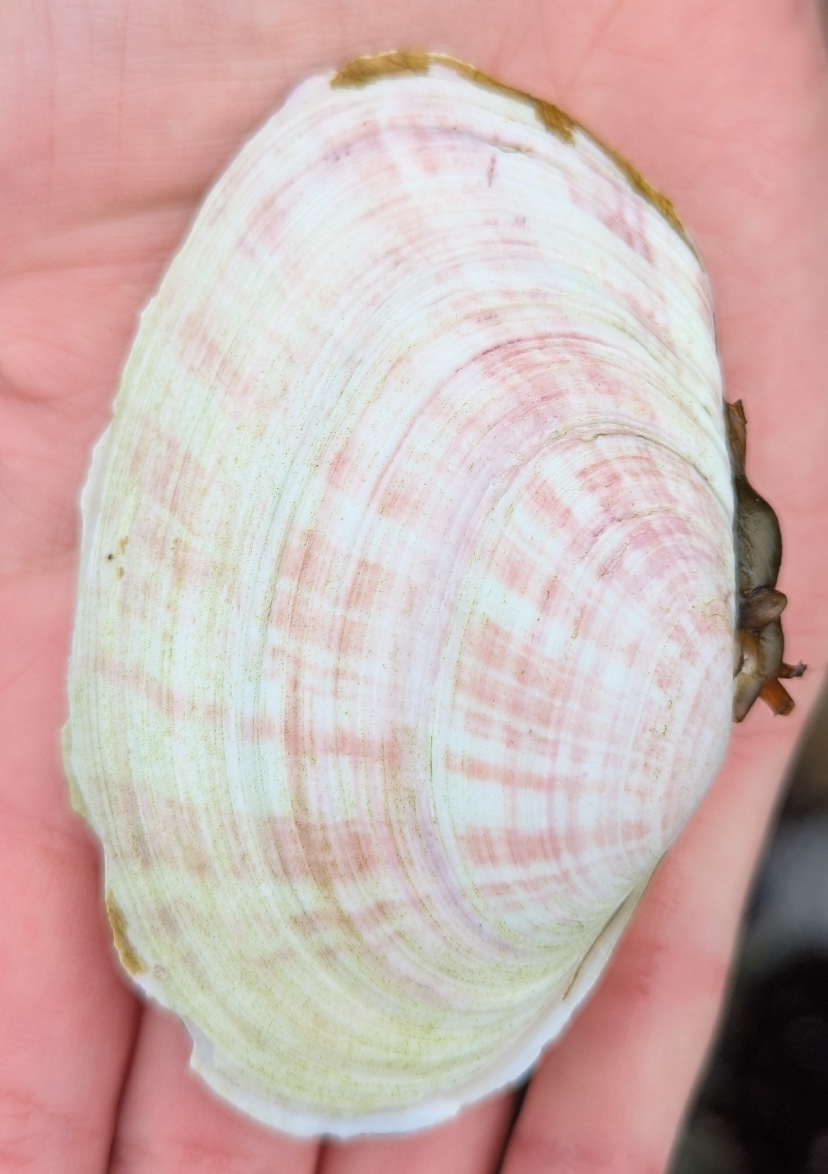
- The shell, seen here with pink stripes and remnants of the periostracum.

Scientific classification
- Kingdom: Animalia
- Phylum: Mollusca
- Class: Bivalvia
- Order: Cardiida
- Superfamily: Tellinoidea
- Family: Psammobiidae
- Genus: Gari
- Species: G. californica

Binomial name
- Gari californica (Conrad, 1849)

Synonyms
- Gari (Gobraeus) californica (Conrad, 1849); Gari (Psammocola) californica (Conrad, 1849); Psammobia californica Conrad, 1849; Psammobia lilacina Wilkins, 1958; Psammobia rubroradiata P. P. Carpenter, 1864

= Gari californica =

Species of bivalve

Gari californica, or the California sunset clam, is a bivalve mollusc of the family Psammobiidae. It is known from Puget Sound, Washington to southern Alaska, and from northern Mexico to central California. It can be found buried 15 - 20 cm deep in the sand or gravel, from the intertidal up to depths of 150 m, as well as in the entrances of bays.

== Description ==
The California sunset clam has a thick white shell, up to 15 cm in diameter and 10 cm in height. Faded pink stripes typically emanate from a prominent beak, which inspires the common name. Remains of the periostracum are typically found only around the edge of the shell.

== Taxonomy ==
The California sunset clam was originally described by Timothy Abbott Conrad in 1849 under the genus Psammobia, which has since been reclassified under the genus Gari. Conrad's holotype was collected by the naturalist Thomas Nuttall. Unknowingly, the same specimen was also used by Philip Pearsall Carpenter in his 1864 description of the synonymous Psammobia rubroradiata. Historically, a related species G. kazusensis has also been synonymized with G. californica. However, G. kazusensis has since been distinguished morphologically and geographically, where it is known only from northern China, Korea, and Japan.

== Ecology ==
The California sunset clam is both a suspension feeder and a deposit feeder. The species provides a source of food for octopuses and sea otters, as well as for crabs, sea stars, and shorebirds.

== Etymology ==
The etymology of the generic name Gari is not given in the original description, but it is thought to derive from the name of the fish sauce garum. The specific epithet californica presumably refers to the holotype locality, although the location of the Nuttall holotype was not specified.
