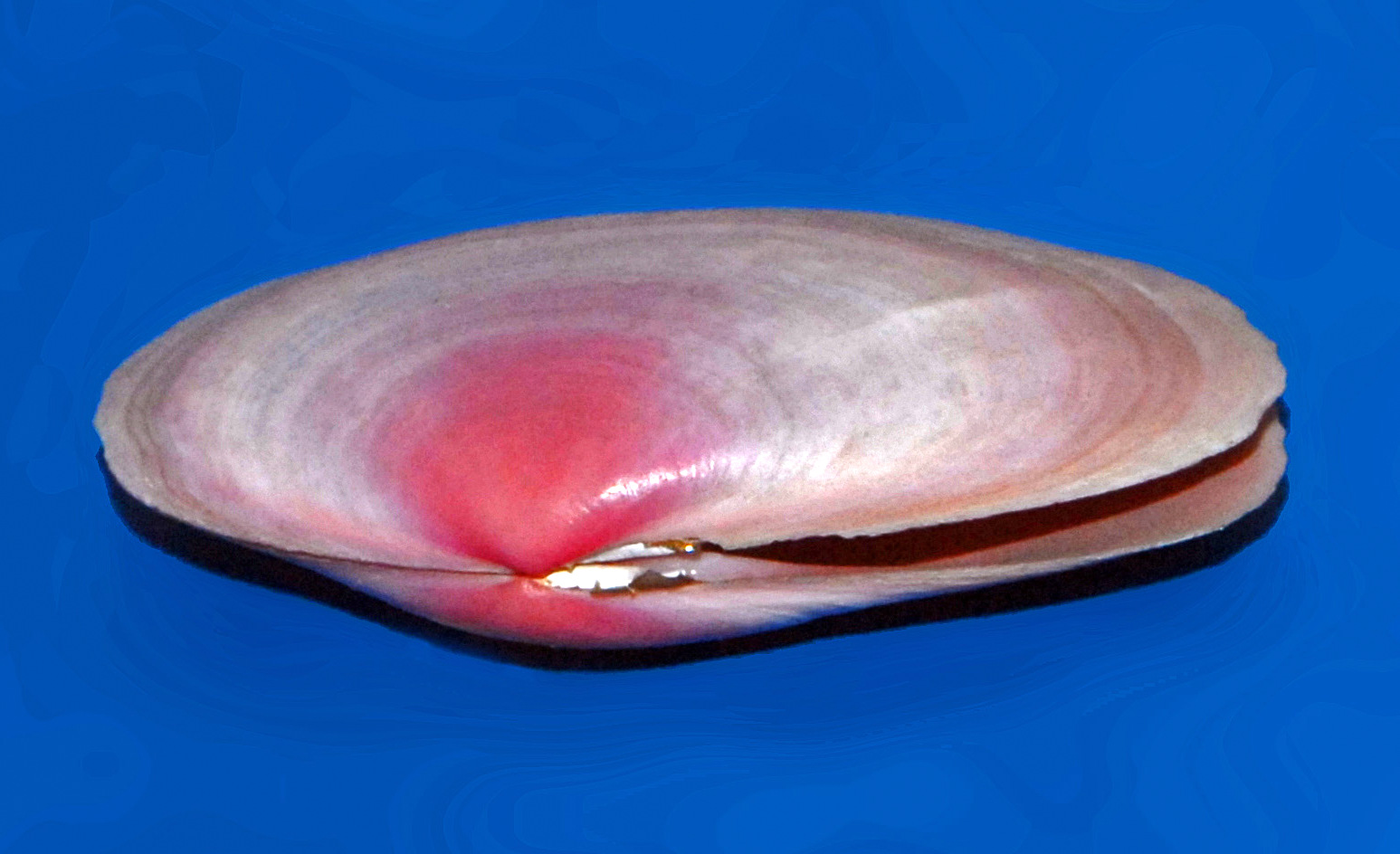
- Shell of Sanguinolaria tellinoides from Honduras at the Museo Civico di Storia Naturale di Milano

Scientific classification
- Domain: Eukaryota
- Kingdom: Animalia
- Phylum: Mollusca
- Class: Bivalvia
- Order: Cardiida
- Family: Psammobiidae
- Genus: Sanguinolaria; Lamarck, 1799

Species
- See text

Synonyms
- Lobaria Schumacher, 1817 (synonym); Psammotellina Fischer, 1887; Sanguinolaria (Sanguinolaria) Lamarck, 1799

= Sanguinolaria =

Genus of bivalves

Sanguinolaria is a genus of saltwater clams, marine bivalve molluscs of the family Psammobiidae.

== Species ==
- Sanguinolaria achatina (Spengler, 1798)
- Sanguinolaria ovalis Reeve, 1857
- Sanguinolaria sanguinolenta (Gmelin, 1791)
- Sanguinolaria tellinoides A. Adams, 1850
- Sanguinolaria tenuis Olsson, 1961
- Sanguinolaria vitrea Deshayes, 1855

Synonyms

- Sanguinolaria acuminata (Reeve, 1857): synonym of Hiatula diphos (Linnaeus, 1771)
- Sanguinolaria acuta Cai & Zhuang, 1985: synonym of Hiatula acuta (Cai & Zhuang, 1985) (original combination)
- Sanguinolaria africana Cosel, 1990: synonym of Sanguinolaria achatina (Spengler, 1798)
- Sanguinolaria antarctica Mabille & Rochebrune, 1889: synonym of Macoploma inornata (Hanley, 1844)
- Sanguinolaria atrata (Reeve, 1857): synonym of Hiatula atrata (Reeve, 1857)
- Sanguinolaria aureocincta E. von Martens, 1879: synonym of Sanguinolaria vitrea Deshayes, 1855
- Sanguinolaria bertini Pilsbry & H. N. Lowe, 1932: synonym of Psammotella bertini (Pilsbry & H. N. Lowe, 1932) (original combination)
- Sanguinolaria californiana Conrad, 1837: synonym of Limecola petalum (Valenciennes in Humboldt & Bonpland, 1821): synonym of Macoma petalum (Valenciennes in Humboldt & Bonpland, 1821)
- Sanguinolaria capensis (G. B. Sowerby III, 1889): synonym of Hiatula capensis (G. B. Sowerby III, 1889)
- Sanguinolaria castanea Scarlato, 1965: synonym of Gari chinensis (Deshayes, 1855)
- Sanguinolaria clouei (Bertin, 1880): synonym of Hiatula clouei Bertin, 1880
- Sanguinolaria cruenta ([Lightfoot], 1786): synonym of Psammotella cruenta ([Lightfoot], 1786)
- Sanguinolaria dichotoma Anton, 1838: synonym of Asaphis violascens (Forsskål in Niebuhr, 1775) (junior synonym)
- Sanguinolaria diphos (Linnaeus, 1771): synonym of Hiatula diphos (Linnaeus, 1771)
- Sanguinolaria elongata (Lamarck, 1818): synonym of Gari elongata (Lamarck, 1818)
- Sanguinolaria grandis Carpenter, 1857: synonym of Nuttallia nuttallii (Conrad, 1837)
- Sanguinolaria hendersoni Melvill & Standen, 1898: synonym of Salmacoma nobilis (Hanley, 1845)
- Sanguinolaria iridescens Benson, 1842: synonym of Iridona iridescens (Benson, 1842) (original combination)
- Sanguinolaria lamarckii Deshayes, 1824 †: synonym of Homalina lamarckii (Deshayes, 1824) † (unaccepted > superseded combination)
- Sanguinolaria livida Lamarck, 1818: synonym of Hiatula biradiata (W. Wood, 1815)
- Sanguinolaria lunulata (Deshayes, 1855): synonym of Hiatula lunulata (Deshayes, 1855)
- Sanguinolaria nivea Mörch, 1853: synonym of Sanguinolaria sanguinolenta (Gmelin, 1791)
- Sanguinolaria nuttallii Conrad, 1837: synonym of Nuttallia nuttallii (Conrad, 1837) (original combination)
- Sanguinolaria olivacea (Jay, 1857): synonym of Nuttallia obscurata (Reeve, 1857)
- Sanguinolaria orcutti Dall, 1921: synonym of Nuttallia nuttallii (Conrad, 1837)
- Sanguinolaria purpurea Deshayes, 1855: synonym of Sanguinolaria tellinoides A. Adams, 1850
- Sanguinolaria robertsii Tryon, 1870: synonym of Hiatula ambigua (Reeve, 1857)
- Sanguinolaria rosea Lamarck, 1801: synonym of Sanguinolaria sanguinolenta (Gmelin, 1791)
- Sanguinolaria tahitensis Bernardi, 1852: synonym of Asaphis violascens (Forsskål in Niebuhr, 1775)
- Sanguinolaria tchangsii Scarlato, 1965: synonym of Psammosphaerita tchangsii (Scarlato, 1965)
- Sanguinolaria togata (Deshayes, 1855): synonym of Gari togata (Deshayes, 1855)
- Sanguinolaria ventricosa Philippi, 1851: synonym of Asaphis violascens (Forsskål in Niebuhr, 1775)
- Sanguinolaria vespertina Pilsbry & H. N. Lowe, 1932: synonym of Sanguinolaria ovalis Reeve, 1857
- Sanguinolaria vitrea Deshayes, 1855 sensu Nicklès, 1952: synonym of Sanguinolaria achatina (Spengler, 1798) (misapplication)
