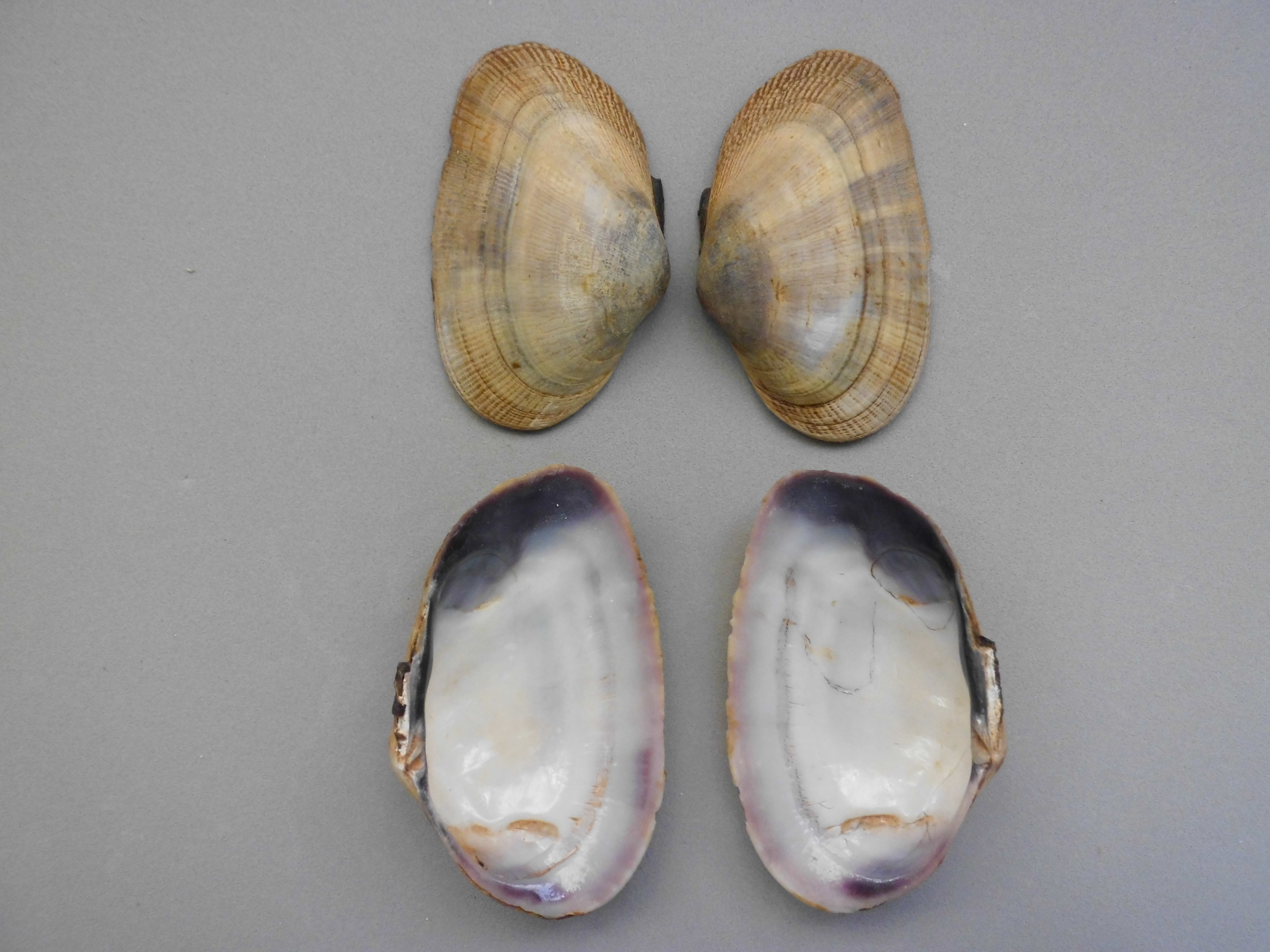

Scientific classification
- Kingdom: Animalia
- Phylum: Mollusca
- Class: Bivalvia
- Order: Cardiida
- Family: Psammobiidae
- Genus: Asaphis
- Species: A. deflorata

Binomial name
- Asaphis deflorata (Linnaeus, 1758)

= Asaphis deflorata =

Species of bivalve

Asaphis deflorata, common name the gaudy sanguin, is a species of bivalve in the family Psammobiidae.

== Description ==
The shell size ranges from 40 to 70 mm (1.6 to 2.8 in).

Right and left valve of the same specimen:

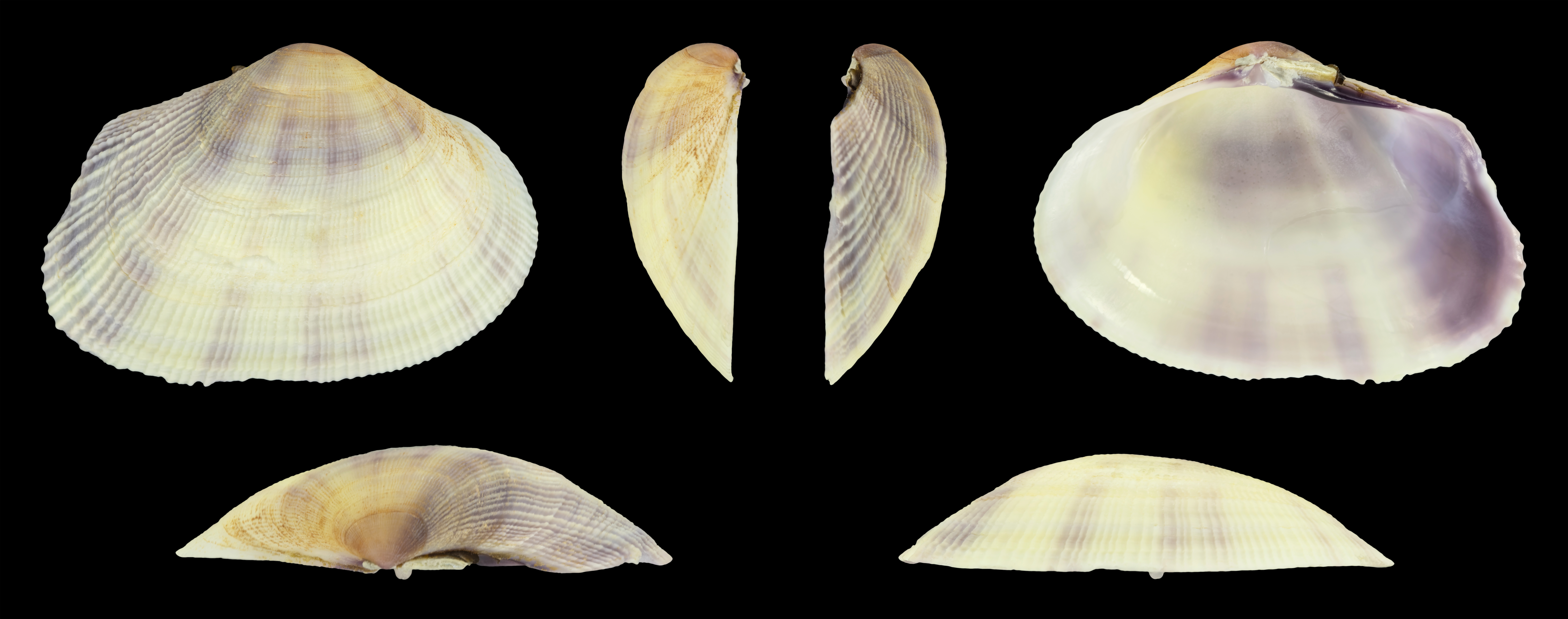
Right valve

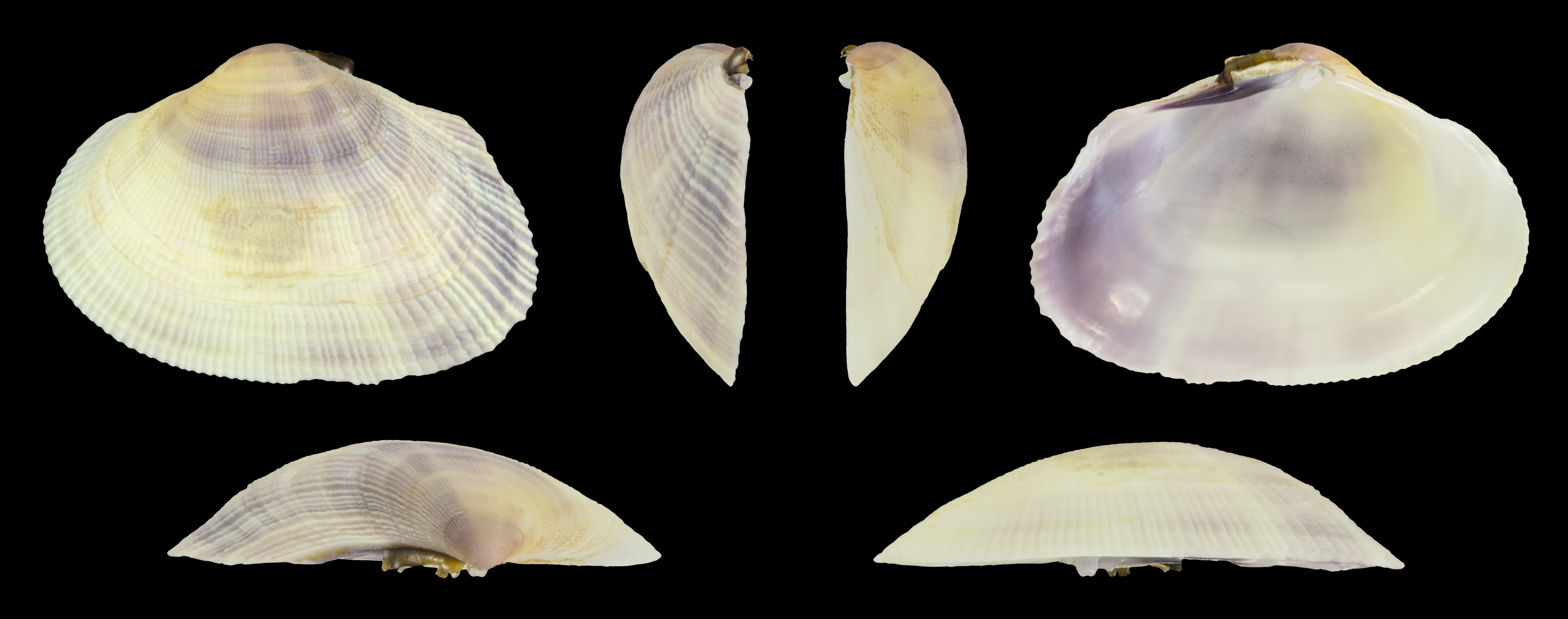
Left valve

== Distribution ==
This species is found in South-Eastern Florida, Central America, the Red Sea, and the Indian and Pacific Oceans.
