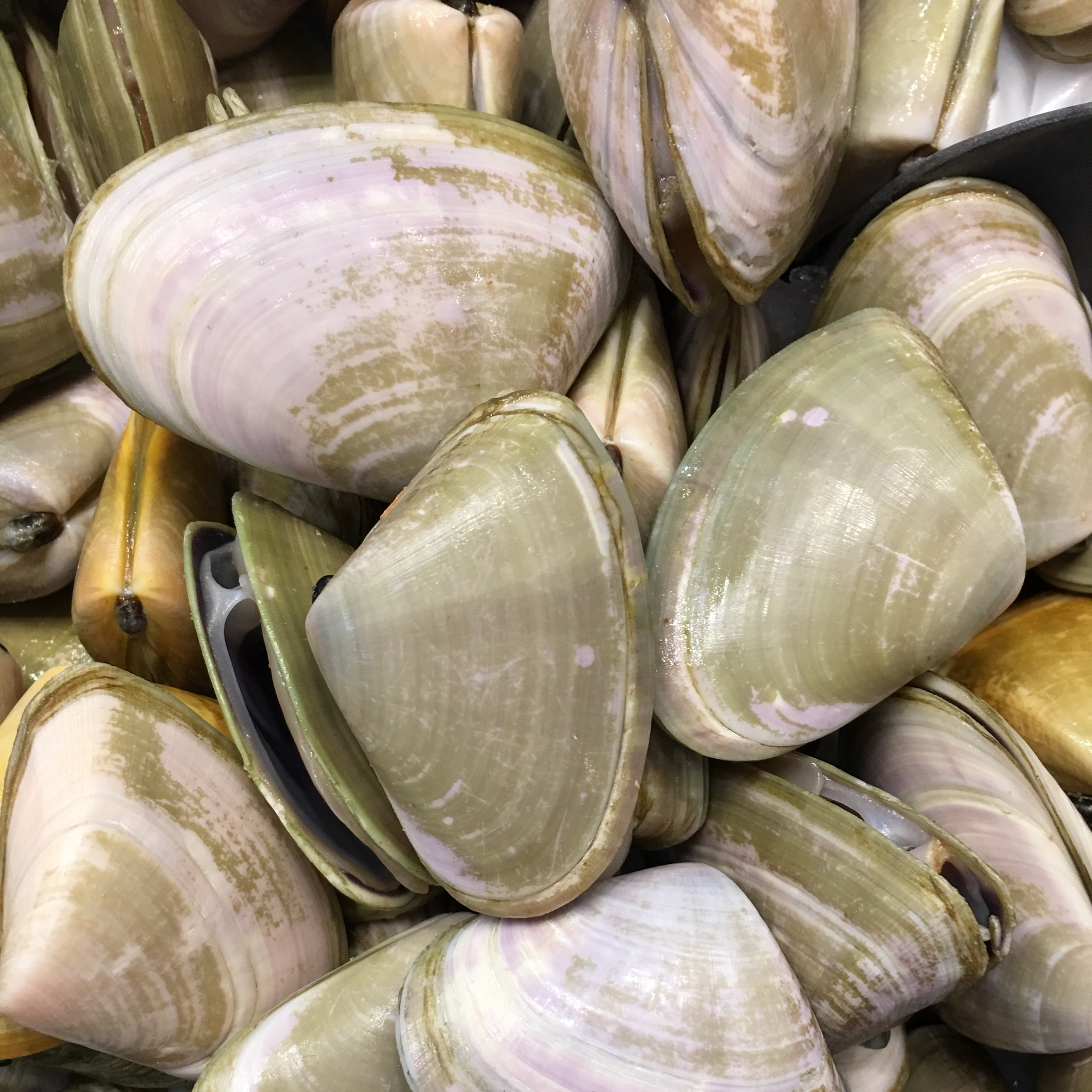
- Plebidonax deltoides

Scientific classification
- Domain: Eukaryota
- Kingdom: Animalia
- Phylum: Mollusca
- Class: Bivalvia
- Order: Cardiida
- Family: Psammobiidae
- Genus: Plebidonax; Iredale, 1930

= Plebidonax =

Genus of bivalves

Plebidonax is a genus of bivalves belonging to the family Psammobiidae.

The species of this genus are found in Australia and Malesia.

Species:

- Plebidonax deltoides (Lamarck, 1818)
- Plebidonax kenyoniana (Chapman & Gabriel, 1914)
