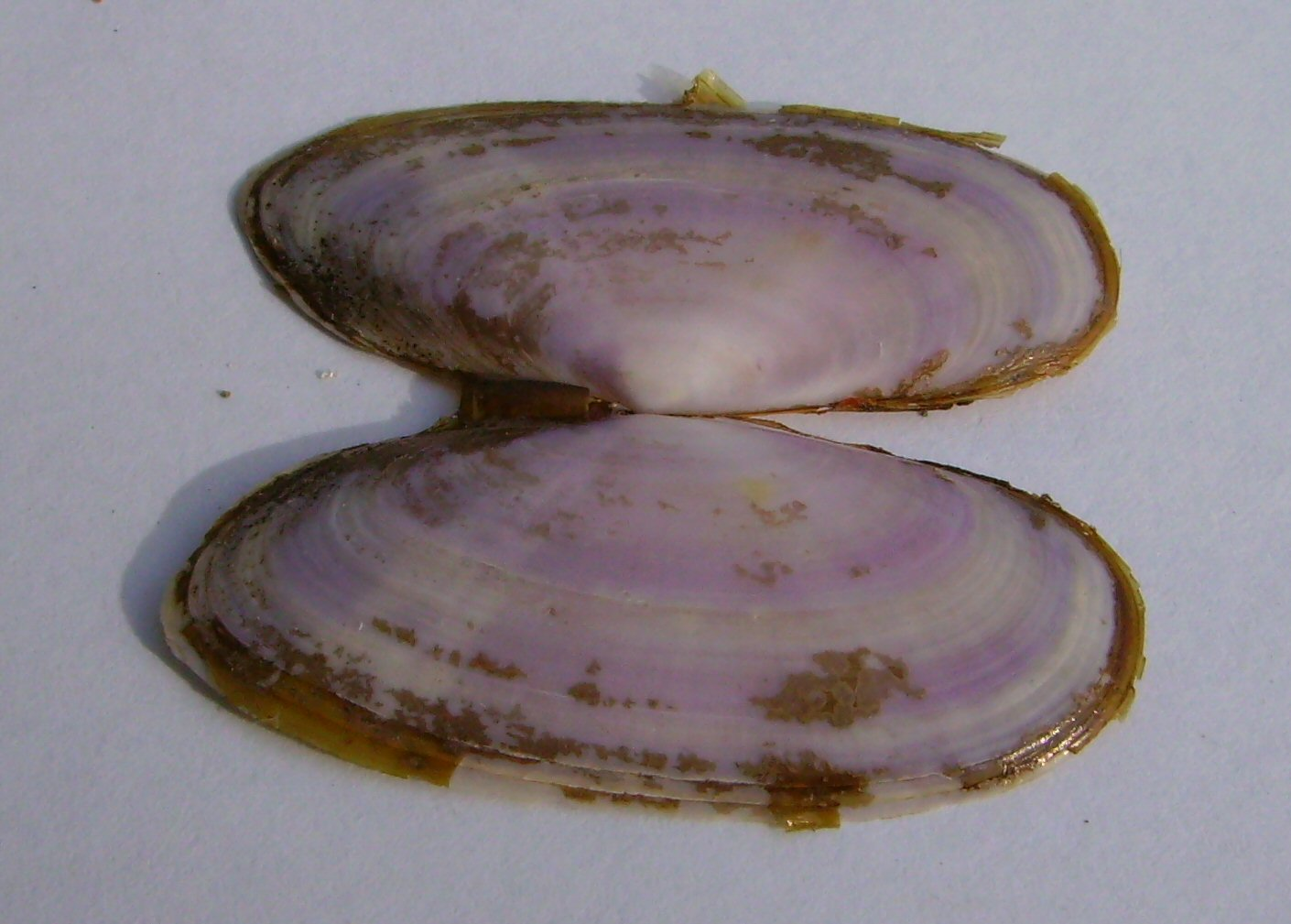

Scientific classification
- Kingdom: Animalia
- Phylum: Mollusca
- Class: Bivalvia
- Order: Cardiida
- Family: Psammobiidae
- Genus: Soletellina
- Species: S. nitida

Binomial name
- Soletellina nitida (Gray, 1835)

Synonyms
- Psammobia nitida Gray, 1843

= Soletellina nitida =

Species of bivalve

Soletellina nitida, commonly known as the shining sunset shell, is a bivalve mollusc of the family Psammobiidae.
