= S. nitida =

S. nitida may refer to:

- Segmentina nitida, the shining ram's-horn snail, a freshwater snail species found in Europe
- Soletellina nitida, the shining sunset shell, a bivalve mollusc species

== See also ==
- Nitida (disambiguation)
