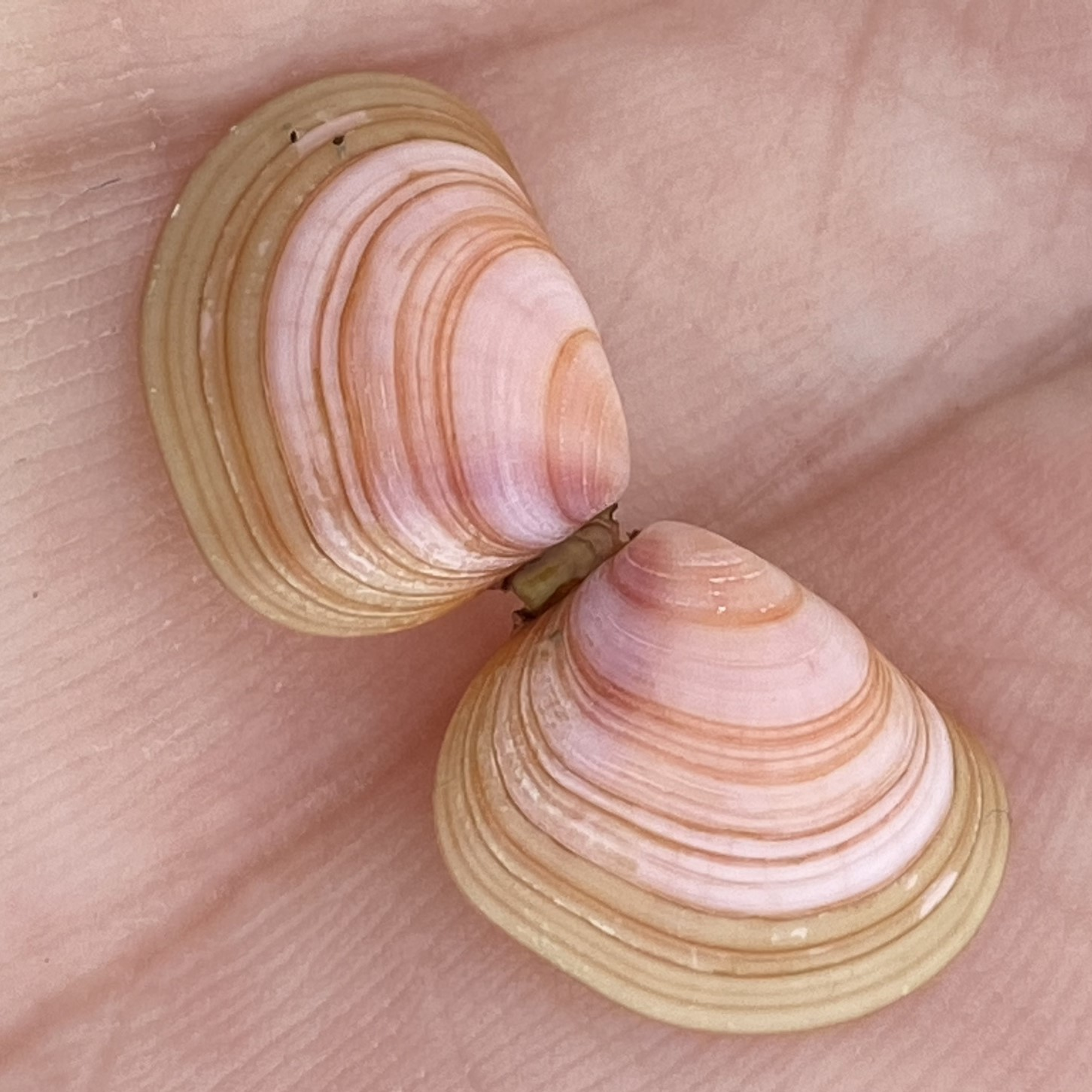
- Tellina nuculoides

Scientific classification
- Kingdom: Animalia
- Phylum: Mollusca
- Class: Bivalvia
- Order: Cardiida
- Superfamily: Tellinoidea
- Family: Tellinidae
- Genus: Tellina; Linnaeus, 1758

Species
- See text.

Synonyms
- List: Liotellina P. Fischer, 1887; Musculus Mörch, 1853; †Tellina (Gastranopsis) Cossmann, 1906; Tellina (Liotellina) P. Fischer, 1887; †Tellina (Macaliopsis) Cossmann, 1886; Tellina (Tellina) Linnaeus, 1758; Tellina (Tellinarius) Froriep, 1806; Tellinarius Froriep, 1806

= Tellina =

Genus of bivalves

Tellina is a widely distributed genus of marine bivalve molluscs, in the family Tellinidae. It is also known as "tellin" in English.

== Species ==
The following species are recognised in the genus Tellina:

- Tellina angrensis (Marques & Simone, 2014)
- Tellina brasiliana Spengler, 1798
- Tellina chrysogona Dall, 1908
- Tellina iheringi Dall, 1908
- Tellina nuculoides Reeve, 1854: salmon tellin
- Tellina radiata Linnaeus, 1758: sunrise tellin
- Tellina rhodon Hanley, 1844
- Tellina simplaria A. E. Salisbury, 1934
