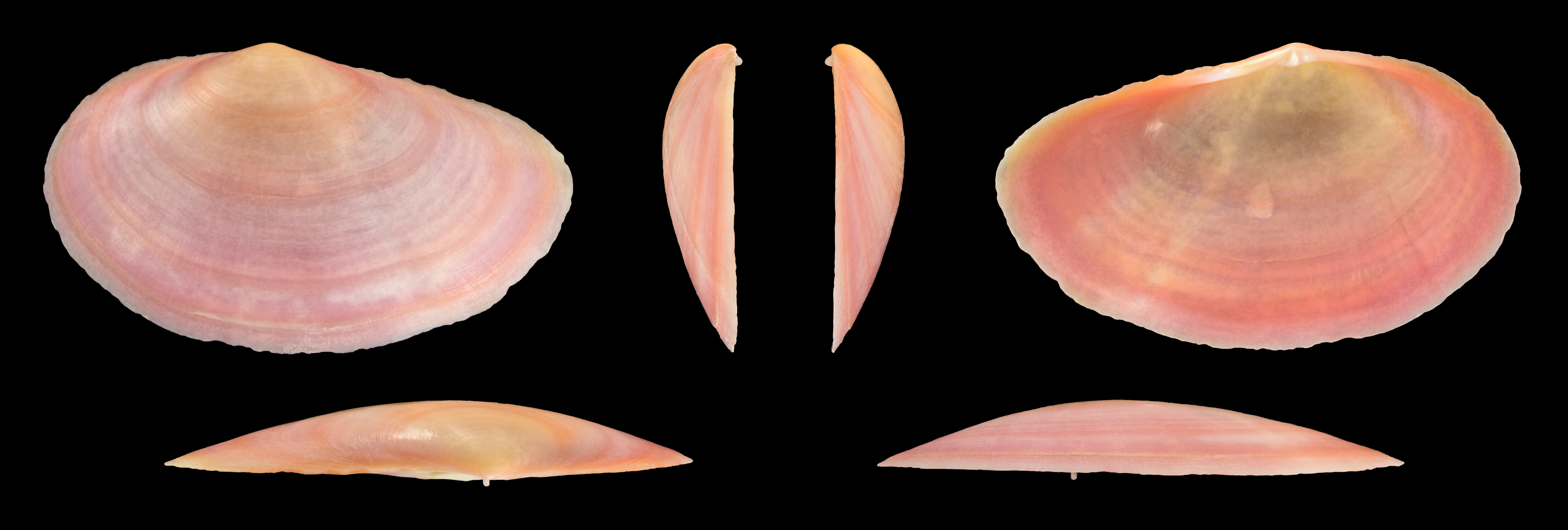
- Left valve of Sanguinolaria tellinoides from Guatemala

Scientific classification
- Kingdom: Animalia
- Phylum: Mollusca
- Class: Bivalvia
- Order: Cardiida
- Family: Psammobiidae
- Genus: Sanguinolaria
- Species: S. tellinoides

Binomial name
- Sanguinolaria tellinoides A. Adams, 1850

Synonyms
- Sanguinolaria purpurea Deshayes, 1855; Sanguinolaria tellinoides elongata Mörch, 1860; Tellina miniata Gould, 185

= Sanguinolaria tellinoides =

Species of bivalve

Sanguinolaria tellinoides is a species of saltwater clam, marine bivalve molluscs of the family Psammobiidae.

== Description ==
Sanguinolaria tellinoides can reach a size of 30–70 mm. It is a facultatively mobile infaunal deposit feeder.

== Distribution ==
This species is present along the Pacific coast of United States, Mexico and Central America (Costa Rica, Nicaragua, Honduras, Ecuador).
