= Nuttallia (disambiguation) =

Nuttallia may refer to:

- Nuttallia, a genus of saltwater clams in the family Psammobiidae
- Nuttallia, a synonym of the plant genus Callirhoe in the family Malvaceae
