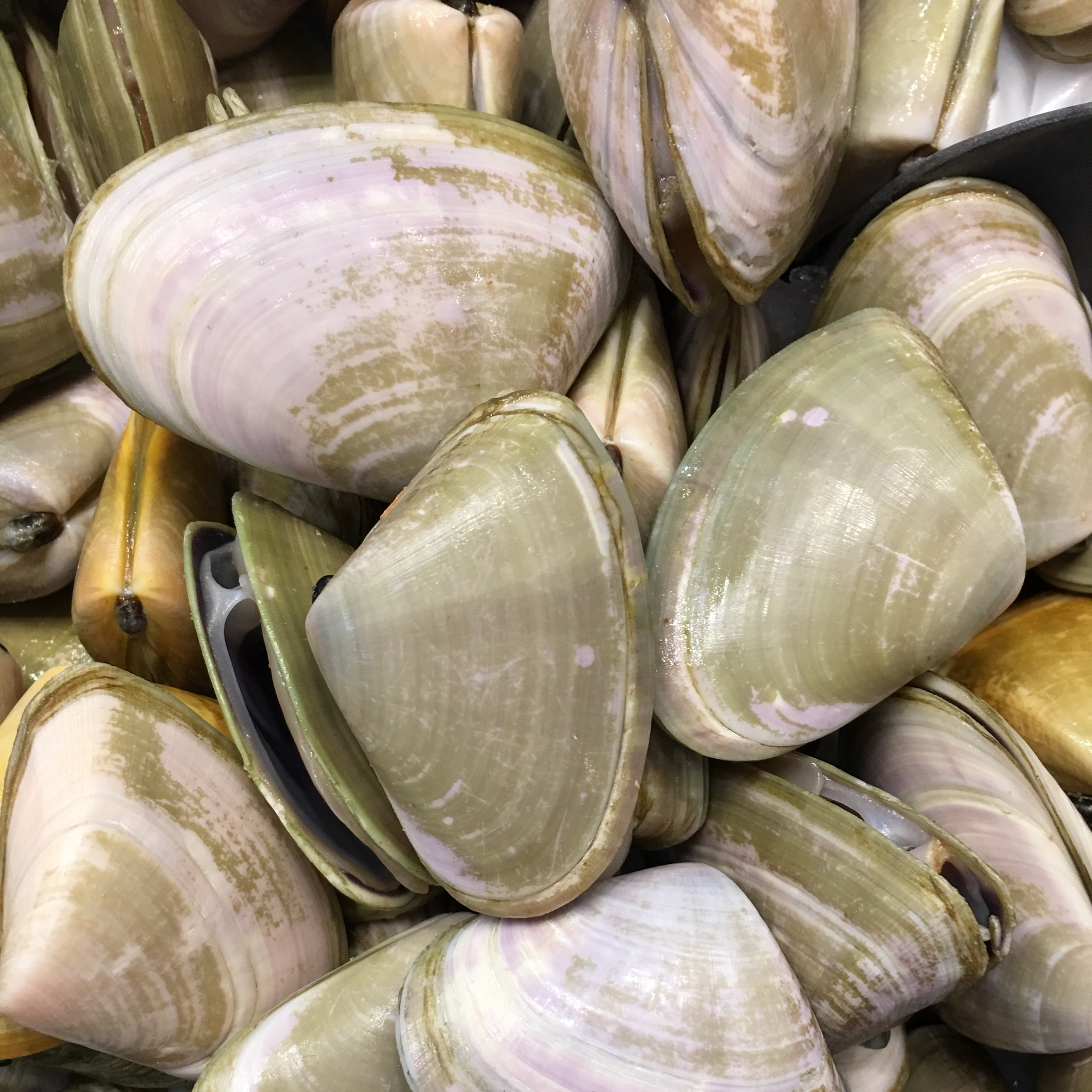

Scientific classification
- Kingdom: Animalia
- Phylum: Mollusca
- Class: Bivalvia
- Order: Cardiida
- Family: Psammobiidae
- Genus: Plebidonax
- Species: P. deltoides

Binomial name
- Plebidonax deltoides Lamarck, 1818

Synonyms
- Donax deltoides

= Plebidonax deltoides =

Species of bivalve

Plebidonax deltoides or Donax deltoides is a small, edible saltwater clam or marine bivalve mollusc, endemic to Australia. It belongs to the family of either the Donacidae, or the related Psammobiidae. It is most widely known as the pipi (/ˈpɪpi/; also spelled pippi, plural pipis or pippies) in the eastern states of its native Australia. In South Australia, it is called the Coorong cockle, Goolwa cockle, or Goolwa pipi, for the region where it is most abundant, or by its Ngarrindjeri name, kuti. In south-eastern Queensland, it is often also known as eugarie or (y)ugari, a borrowing from the local Yugambeh and Ugarapul languages.

This species should not be confused with the bivalve Paphies australis (of the family Mesodesmatidae), endemic to New Zealand and also called "pipi".

== Life cycle ==
A pipi (plebidonax deltoid) burying itself in the sand

P. deltoides is an edible bivalve mollusc primarily found from the Eyre Peninsula to Kingston SE in South Australia and from Tasmania to Fraser Island in Queensland, with Younghusband Peninsula (Coorong Beach) in South Australia the site of the largest stock abundance in Australia, where they make up 85% of the total biomass. The Sir Richard Peninsula (Goolwa Beach) and Younghusband Peninsula sand dunes are composed mainly of P. deltoides shell sediments that have formed over the last 6,600 years.

P. deltoides live on high-energy beaches, the juveniles in the intertidal zone and the adults in the subtidal zone. They use a strong foot to burrow into the sand to an average depth of 100 mm (3.9 inches) and feed by filtering phytoplankton from the water. They mature at around one year of age and live from four to five years, reaching a maximum size of 80 mm (3.1 in). They are dioecious serial broadcast spawners, with spawning taking place over a long period of time peaking in the spring. Larvae drift as plankton for four to eight weeks in the coastal currents, often travelling large distances. They need heavy surf to live, as the surf concentrates the phytoplankton they feed on and increases the oxygen in the water; after periods of calm weather, they begin to die off.

== Taxonomy ==
Donax deltoïdes was first named and briefly described by Jean-Baptiste Lamarck in 1818. He indicated that the description was based on specimen(s) collected from Kangaroo Island by François Péron.

In 1930, Tom Iredale proposed three new genera for species that he judged do "not agree with the type of Donax, nor with Chion". These were Plebidonax (type Donax deltoides Lamarck), Tentidonax (Donax veruinus Hedley), and Deltachion (containing two new species).

Plebidonax has been adopted by some reference works, but has not been widely accepted, with many publications still using Donax. Other sources treat Plebidonax as a subspecies of Donax. If classified as Plebidonax, it is the only member of its genus.

A study of five genes published in 2017 found that P. deltoides grouped with the Psammobiidae, not the Donacidae.

== South Australia ==
The Ngarrindjeri people had long used pipi, which they called kuti, as an important source of protein in their diet. Cooked on hot coals or in mud ovens, kuti was eaten on the beach. Numerous ancient shell middens still in evidence around the Coorong and Goolwa beaches, as well as areas now underwater, attest to this practice. After British colonisation of South Australia and the establishment of the Raukkan (previously Point McLeay) mission in 1859, the Ngarrindjeri were removed from their land, thereby becoming unable to access their traditional fishing and hunting grounds. Famous Ngarrindjeri author and inventor David Unaipon (who is featured on the Australian $50 note) asked the 1913 Royal Commission on the Aborigines for a fishing licence, but this was not granted.

From then until the 1990s, pipis were primarily used by Europeans as bait in South Australia, and it was not until Italian immigrants introduced vongole into restaurants in the 1990s that prices increased to the point of viability for commercial fishing. In 2004, regulations regarding human consumption were included into the Fisheries Act 1982, and 32 licences to harvest unlimited quantities were offered at A$150,000 each. Subsequently, imported Asian clam species have largely replaced P. deltoides as bait because of their lower cost.

The Cockle Train, the oldest steel-tracked railway in Australia, was built in 1854 from Port Elliot to Goolwa to transfer cargo from ocean-going vessels to river boats. The train acquired its name due to its extensive use by colonists to collect pipis from beaches near the mouth of the Murray River. Originally 11 km (6.8 miles) in length, the line was extended to Victor Harbor in 1864 and is now a popular tourist attraction

=== 2008: Quotas ===
During the 2008 season, owing to surging demand and decreasing catches, a quota of 600 tonnes (660 tons) was introduced to manage the resource; commercial fishing was restricted to the Younghusband Peninsula, from a point 2 kilometres (1.2 mi) east of the centre of the Murray mouth to Kingston, with recreational fishers banned from catching in these areas. It was subsequently found that 11 of the licences — primarily multi-generational local family fishing companies — were allocated only 1% of the quota each, which would fail to cover their overheads, while 10 licences supplying European markets were allocated up to 15% of the quota each. Two groups lobbied Parliament to protect the respective interests: Goolwa Cockle Working Group representing the 10 large quota holders, and the Southern Fisherman's Association representing the small quotas. The South Australian Legislative Council overturned the quotas on 23 June 2008 on the basis of unfairness.

=== 2009 season ===
The November 2008 to May 2009 season was closed after the fishery dramatically collapsed, with more than 95% of the catch consisting of undersize juveniles. A Parliamentary enquiry is investigating Department of Primary Industries and Resources (PIRSA) for its failure to manage the fishery. An independent organisation, The Goolwa Pipi Harvesters Association — inaugurated in October 2009 — was tasked with ensuring the sustainable development of the P. deltoides retail and export industry. The initial quota for future seasons was set at 600 tonnes annually, less than 2% of the 2008 quota.

=== 2010 season ===
In October 2009 the government reduced the commercial quota to 300 tonnes, and delayed the start of the 2010 season until December. Previously, recreational fishers had been requested to voluntarily limit their catches to 600 per day; however, a new recreational bag limit of 300 per person was now enforceable by law. During the weekend of 9–10 January, fisheries officials patrolled the Victor Harbor and Goolwa Beaches, inspecting over 1,000 recreational catches. Four fishers were fined for exceeding the bag limit and ten for taking undersized individuals; 15,000 undersized P. deltoides were returned to the water.

=== 2011 season ===
Owing to a recovery of fishery stocks, the State Government increased the commercial quota from 300 to 330 tonnes for the 2011 season, the start of which was voluntarily delayed until 1 December 2010. Recreational fishers were permitted to collect on the Younghusband Peninsula between 28 Mile Beach and Kingston jetty. Commercial fishers without a quota could take P. deltoides for their own personal use as bait with a catch limit of 10 kg (22 lb) per day. It was illegal for commercial fishers without quotas to sell or trade P. deltoides. The size limit was not increased but would instead be reviewed annually, and the Goolwa cockle was officially renamed pipi by PIRSA.

=== 2012 season ===
For the 2012 season, the state government increased the commercial quota from 330 to 400 tonnes and announced its intention to proclaim a 5 kilometres (3.1 mi) section of the Younghusband Peninsula a marine sanctuary to provide some protection for future stocks. In reply, commercial fishers announced they planned to lobby the government to either provide compensation or move the sanctuary to a location that would have a lower impact on commercial fishing.

=== 2020: Kuti Co. ===
After the popularity of the pipi had surged in the preceding five years, a new partnership began between Indigenous enterprise Kuti Co. and the highly successful Goolwa Pipi Co., which had established a processing facility at Port Elliott. The partnership deal was struck soon after the Goolwa Pipi Co. had taken over the lease of a beach café at Goolwa, renamed Kuti Shack. The new arrangement saw dozens of Ngarrindjeri workers employed at various stages of production, helping to bring cultural pride and understanding of their heritage.

=== 2025: algal bloom ===
From March 2025, a harmful algal bloom caused by Karenia mikimotoi occurred in South Australia, ongoing as of October 2025. Many marine animals were affected by the bloom, including the pipis, and Goolwa Pipi Co. employees were put out of work and income.

== Victoria ==
Pipis were taken commercially from South Gippsland beaches in "massive quantities" until depletion of stocks in the 1970s reduced the fishery to recreational fishers. Recreational fishers were limited to five litres a person per day until this was reduced to two litres in 2009 due to concern over family groups collecting far in excess of regulations. Recreational fishers required a fishing licence and were prohibited from using tools; pipis must be dug up using hands or feet only.

== New South Wales ==
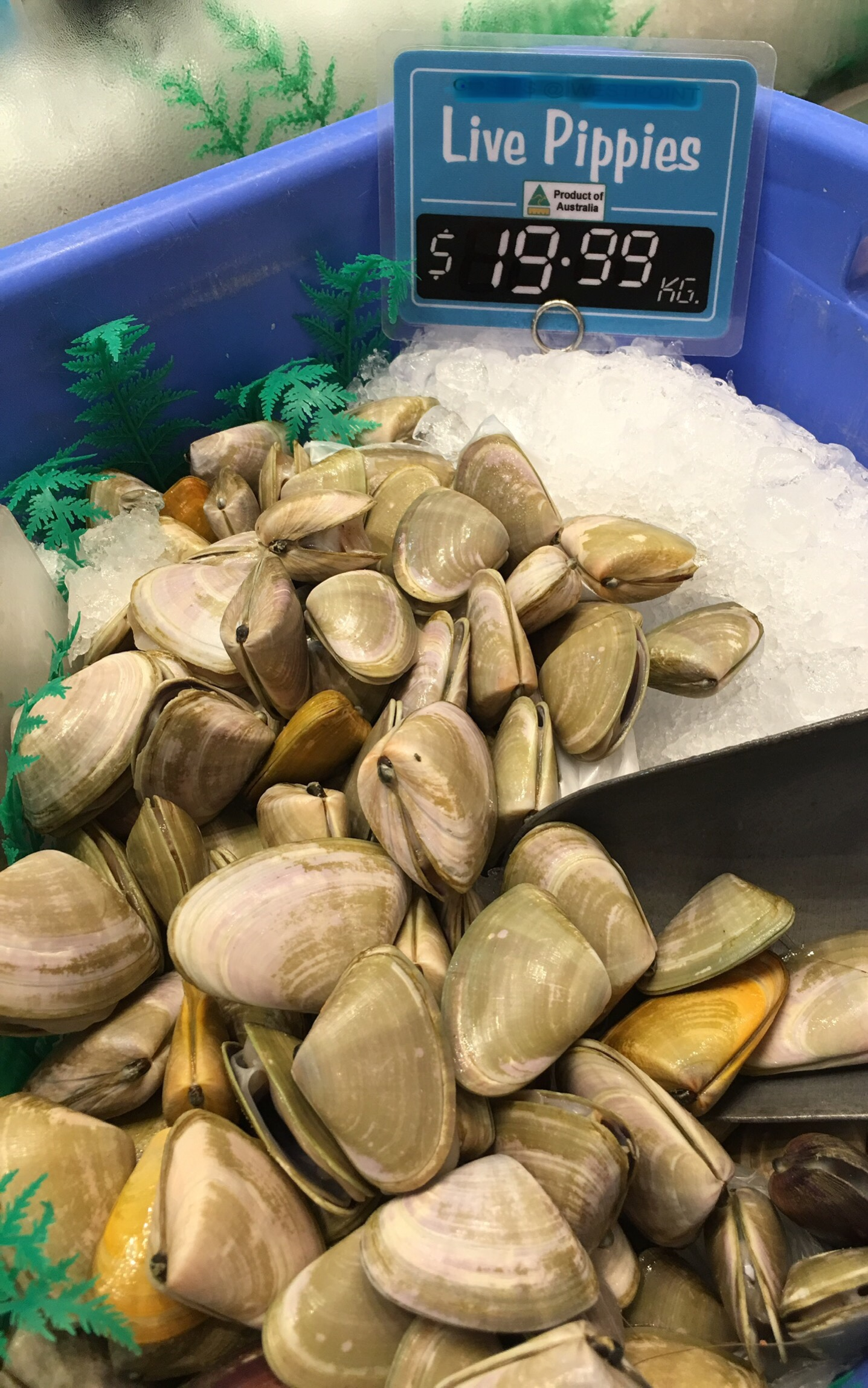
Pippies for sale at a fishmonger in 2020.

A small commercial fishery with no size or catch limit existed since the 1950s, harvesting from 100 to 450 tonnes per year in the 1990s, though this tonnage declined from 1998 because of contamination from algae biotoxins. Commercial harvesting in New South Wales is by hand, with 99% of the commercial catch being taken north of Sydney, half from Stockton Beach. To share the resource and to minimise harvesting for sale on the black market, recreational fishers were allowed a bag limit of 50 pipis per day, to be used only for bait because of a number of biotoxin poisoning cases. According to a 1999 survey, recreational fishers were estimated to take around 45 tonnes per year, 92% for consumption and 8% for bait.

In 2011, following concerns that the fishery may collapse, the Department of Primary Industries implemented a partial season closure and minimum commercial size limit of 40 mm (1.6 in), although recreational fishing has not been further constrained. The NSW Status of Fisheries lists the pipi exploitation status as "Uncertain".
