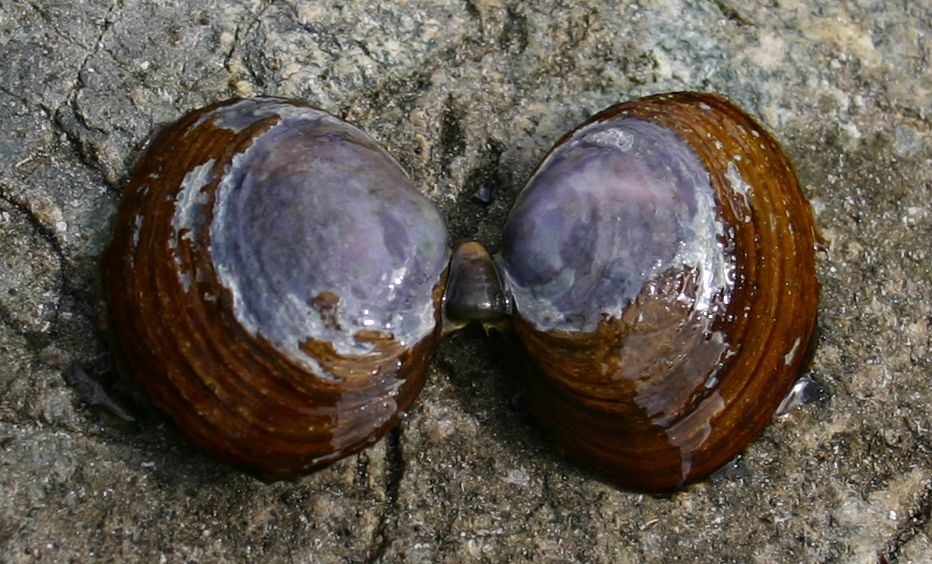
- Exterior
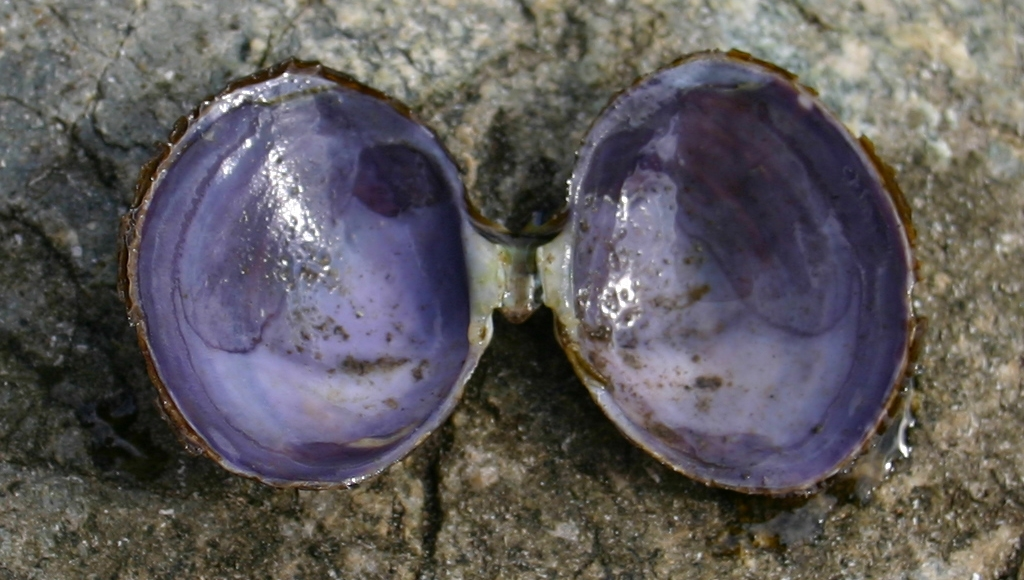
- Interior

Scientific classification
- Kingdom: Animalia
- Phylum: Mollusca
- Class: Bivalvia
- Order: Cardiida
- Family: Psammobiidae
- Genus: Nuttallia
- Species: N. obscurata

Binomial name
- Nuttallia obscurata (Reeve, 1857)

Synonyms
- Nuttallia solida Kira, 1953; Psammobia olivacea Jay, 1857; Soletellina obscurata Reeve, 1857

= Nuttallia obscurata =

Species of bivalve

Nuttallia obscurata, the purple mahogany clam, dark mahogany clam, varnish clam or savory clam, is a species of saltwater clam, a marine bivalve mollusk in the family Psammobiidae. It was first described to science by Lovell Augustus Reeve, a British conchologist, in 1857.

== Description ==
The valves are thin, relatively shallow, and almost oval in shape. They can reach 6.4 centimetres (2.5 in) long. Individuals can achieve a maximum weight of 45 grams (1.6 oz). The exterior of the valves is covered in a shiny brown periostracum, hence one of its common names, "varnish clam". The periostracum is often worn away at the umbo. There are concentric rings on the outside of the valves which can be observed where the periostracum has been removed. The interior of the valves is deep purple to almost white in some individuals. The prominent hinge ligament is external to the valves. Nuttallia obscurata has a large white, muscular foot that it uses to dig in the sand and for propulsion. The animal has two long, white, separate siphons.

Right and left valve of the same specimen:

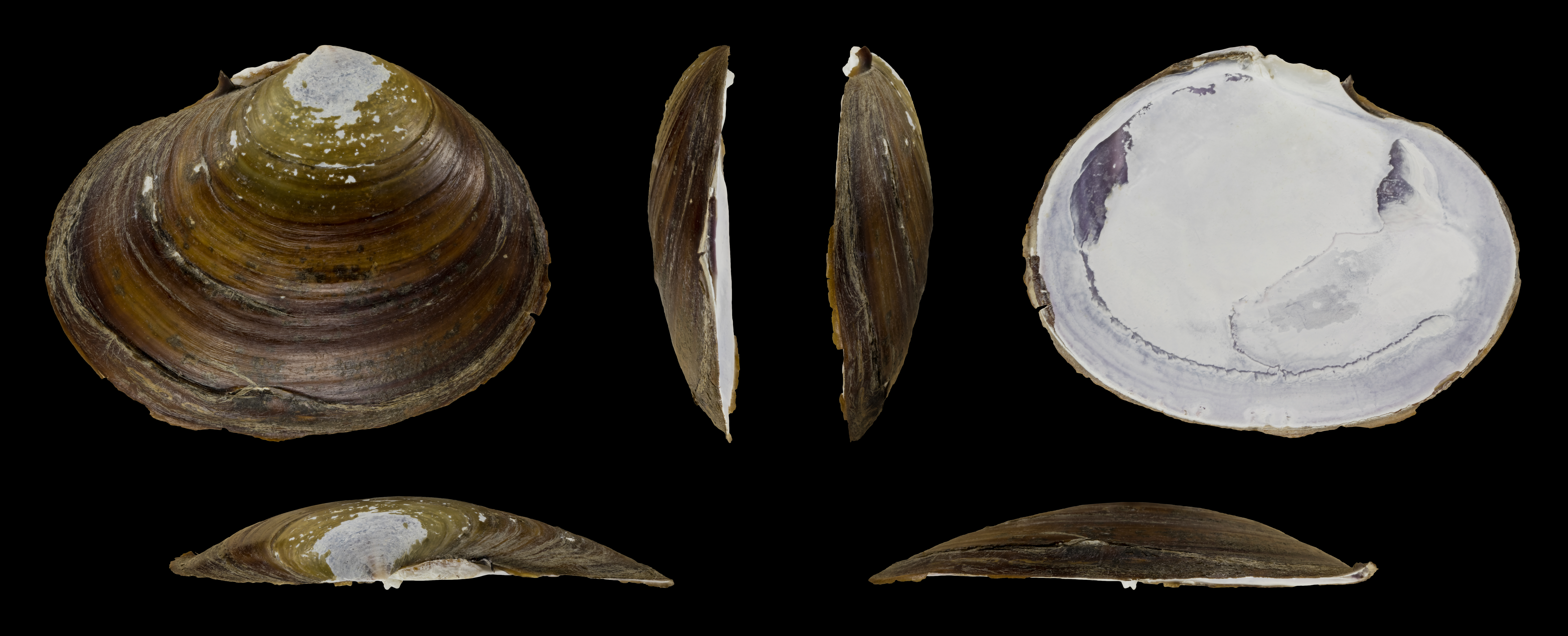
Right valve

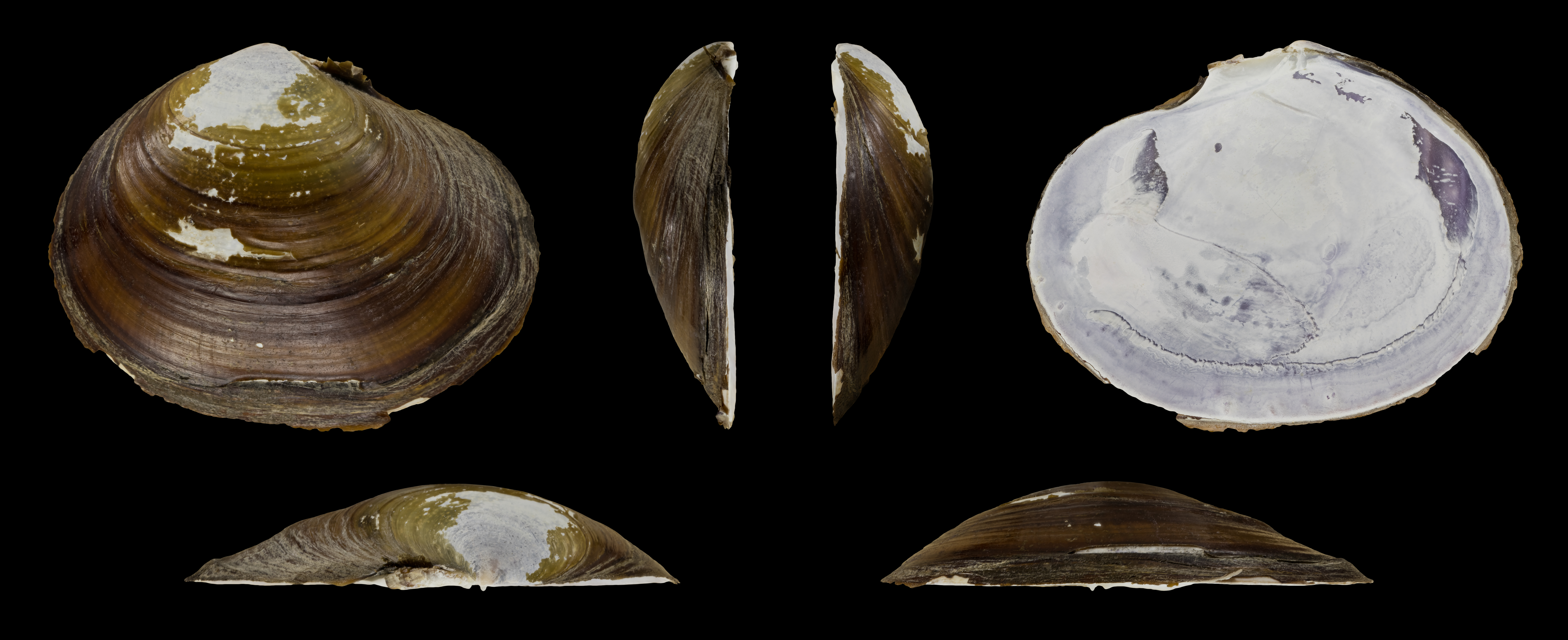
Left valve

== Range and habitat ==
These clams are found in the mid to high intertidal zone, buried in sand, gravel, or silt, from just below the surface to 20 centimetres (7.9 in) deep. They have greater tolerance for salinity conditions than native clams and are sometimes found in brackish waters near freshwater seeps. The species is native to Japan, Korea, and China. It has been naturalized in British Columbia, Washington and Oregon. Its range includes the coast of Vancouver Island, the Strait of Georgia, Puget Sound, and south along the coast to Coos Bay. It is considered an invasive species in North America.

The first collection of Nuttallia obscurata in North America occurred in 1991 near Vancouver. It is hypothesized that planktonic larvae were released by a ship disposing of ballast water she had pumped aboard in Asia. A 2006 study of reproductive ecology and dispersal potential suggested that a "lengthy planktonic phase, combined with favourable oceanographic circulation patterns, has contributed to the rapid dispersal and geographic range expansion of the varnish clam in the Northeast Pacific." By 1998, the species had reached Washington beaches. Where they find suitable habitat, these clams can reach densities of as high as 800 individuals per square meter.

== Life history ==
Nuttallia obscurata can live at least six years. They begin life as free-swimming plankton. This planktonic stage can last from 3 to 8 weeks before they settle to the bottom as recognizable clams. They become reproductively mature at one year old. This species is protandrous, where the young forms are male and then become female later in life. In each population, there are males and females in approximately equal numbers, and 4-5% of the population is hermaphroditic. In some populations, the sex ratio skews towards males for reasons that are not known. Females have been observed to produce between 40,000 and 6,000,000 eggs during the summer breeding season. These oocytes are 55 micrometres (0.0022 in) in diameter. Fertilization takes place by broadcast spawning.

Nuttallia obscurata has two methods of feeding. It is a filter feeder, drawing water in with one siphon and straining out algae and other nutrients. It then ejects water and waste from its other siphon. This species also has the ability to gather material from the surrounding sand with its foot, sweeping detritus to its mouth.

These clams are preyed upon by raccoons, glaucous-winged gulls, Lewis' moonsnails, black oystercatchers, crows, and others. Nuttallia obscurata is also eaten by Dungeness and red rock crabs, both of which appear to prefer it to native littleneck clams, because it is easier to eat.

Pea crabs, Pinnotheridae feba, are known to parasitize this species. As there is no reliable method for removing them, this has been seen as a negative for marketing them as human food.

== Human consumption ==
British Columbia, Washington, and Oregon, all have recreational fisheries for Nuttallia obscurata.

No large-scale commercial fishery exists for this species, although small commercial landings are ongoing in both British Columbia and Washington. Marketing efforts have produced another common name, savory clam, for this species.

Nuttallia obscurata is subject to paralytic shellfish poisoning. They retain biotoxins longer than other clams, so care should be taken when harvesting them.
