= Nuttallia =

Scientific classification
- Domain: Eukaryota
- Kingdom: Animalia
- Phylum: Mollusca
- Class: Bivalvia
- Order: Cardiida
- Superfamily: Tellinoidea
- Family: Psammobiidae
- Genus: Nuttallia; Dall, 1898

Species
- See text.

Synonyms
- Hainania Scarlato, 1965 non Koller, 1927; Nanhaia S. Morris & M. Morris, 1983 [nom. nov. for Hainania Scarlato, 1965]

Genus of bivalves

Nuttallia is a genus of saltwater clams, marine bivalve molluscs in the family Psammobiidae.

== Species ==
Species within the genus Nutallia include:

- Nuttallia ezonis Kuroda & Habe in Habe, 1955
- Nuttallia japonica (Reeve, 1857)
- Nuttallia nuttallii (Conrad, 1837)
- Nuttallia obscurata (Reeve, 1857)
- Nuttallia petri (Bartsch, 1929)
