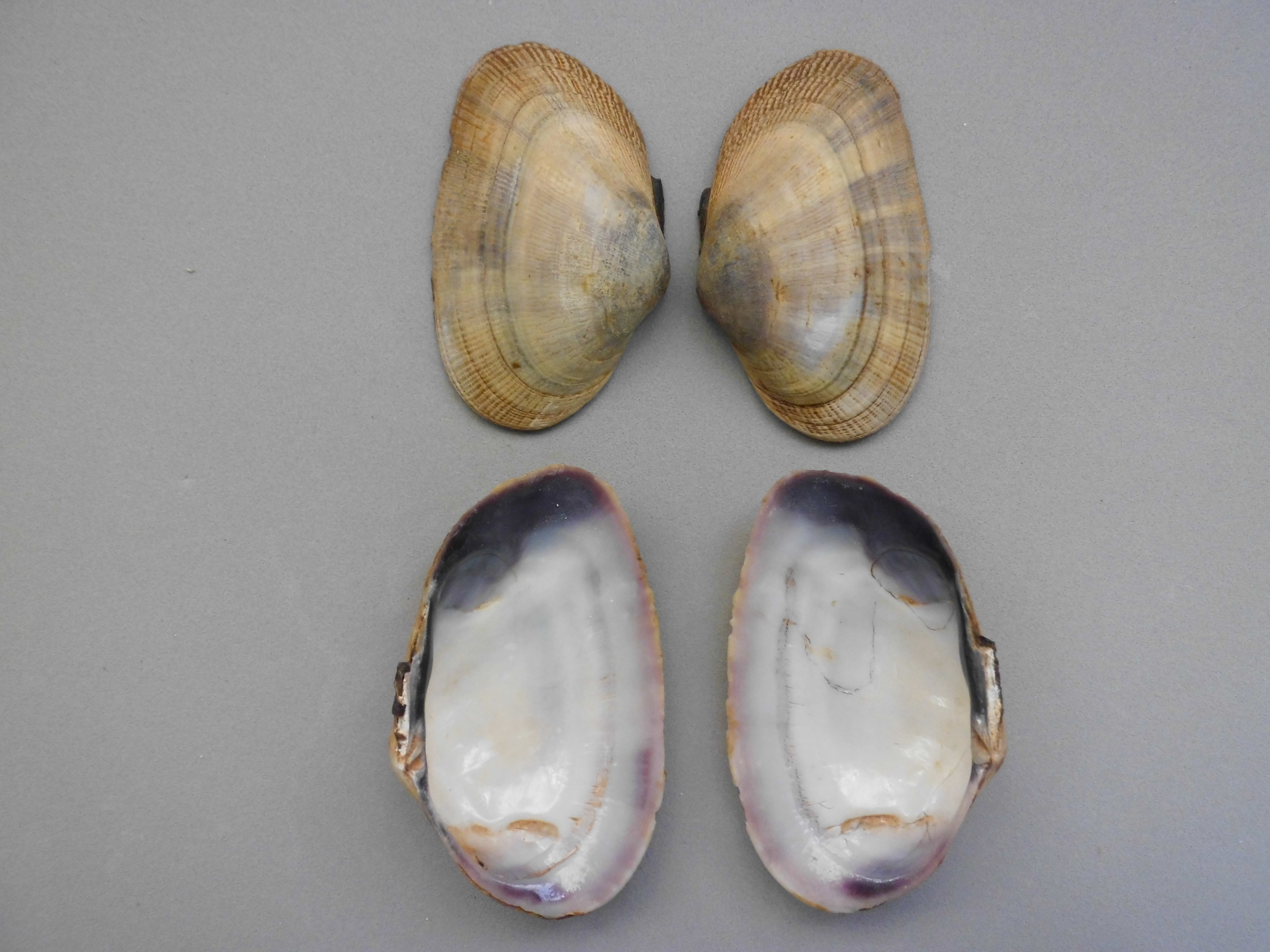
- Asaphis deflorata

Scientific classification
- Domain: Eukaryota
- Kingdom: Animalia
- Phylum: Mollusca
- Class: Bivalvia
- Order: Cardiida
- Family: Psammobiidae
- Genus: Asaphis; Modeer, 1793

= Asaphis =

Genus of bivalves

Asaphis is a genus of bivalves belonging to the family Psammobiidae.

The genus has almost cosmopolitan distribution.

Species:

- Asaphis deflorata (Linnaeus, 1758)
- Asaphis undulata Gabb, 1864
- Asaphis violascens (Forsskål, 1775)
- Asaphus delicatus (Weisbord, 1929)
