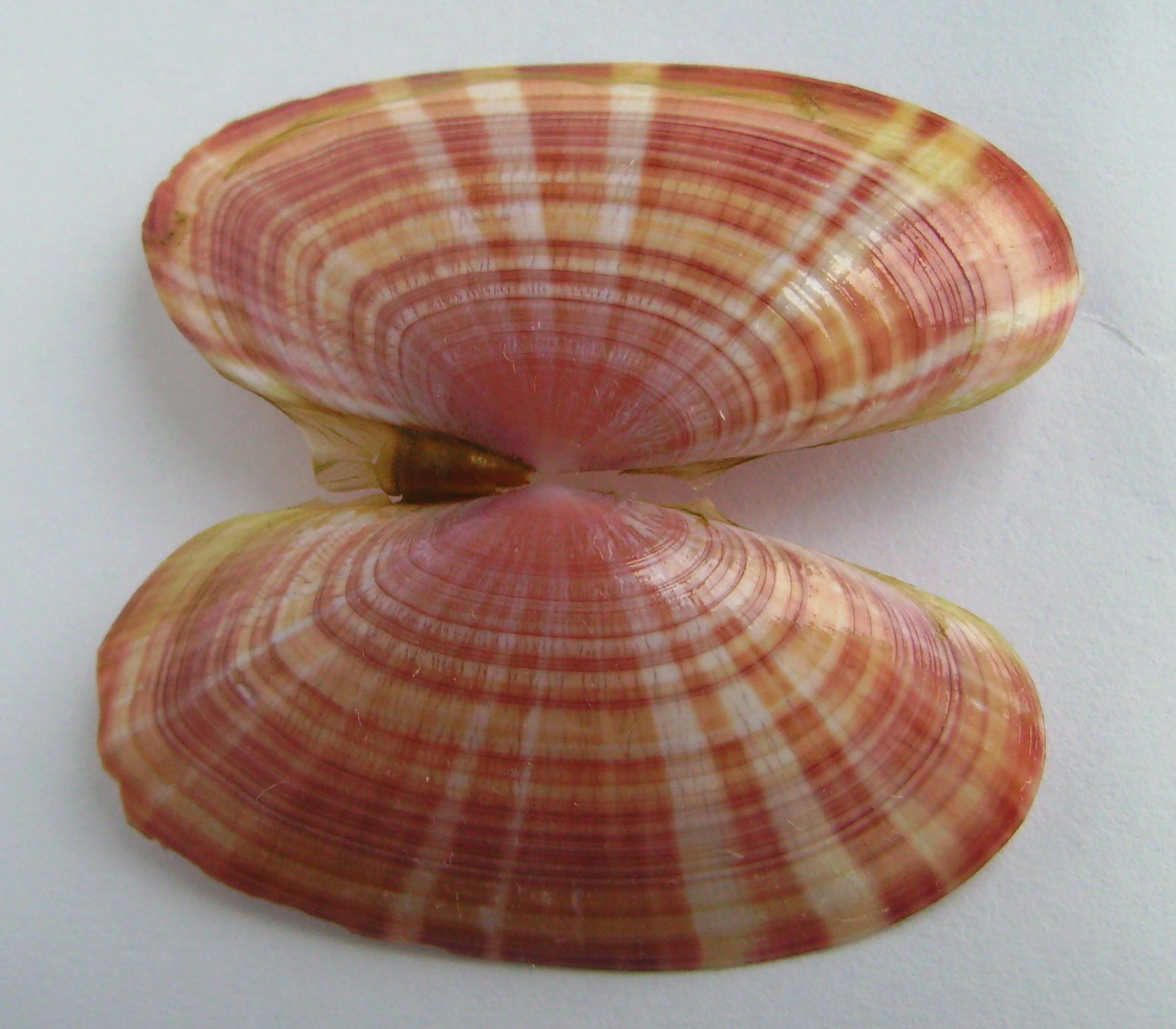
- Gari convexa

Scientific classification
- Kingdom: Animalia
- Phylum: Mollusca
- Class: Bivalvia
- Order: Cardiida
- Superfamily: Tellinoidea
- Family: Psammobiidae
- Genus: Gari; Schumacher, 1817

Synonyms
- Azor J. de C. Sowerby, 1824; Dysmea Dall, Bartsch & Rehder, 1938; Gari (Amphipsammus) Cossmann, 1913 † alternate representation; Gari (Crassulobia) Willan, 1993 alternate representation; Gari (Dysmea) Dall, Bartsch & Rehder, 1938 alternate representation; Gari (Gari) Schumacher, 1817 alternate representation; Gari (Garum) Dall, 1900 †; Gari (Gobraeus) T. Brown, 1844 alternate representation; Gari (Kermadysmea) Powell, 1958 alternate representation; Gari (Psammobella) Gray, 1851 alternate representation; Gari (Psammobia) Lamarck, 1818 alternate representation; Gari (Psammodonax) Cossmann, 1886 alternate representation; Gari (Psammoica) Dall, 1900 †; Gari (Psammotaena) Dall, 1900 alternate representation; Garum Dall, 1900 †; Gobraeus T. Brown, 1844; Grammatomya Dall, 1898; Hiatula (Psammotaea) Lamarck, 1818 alternate representation; Kermadysmea Powell, 1958; Macropsammus Cossmann, 1902; Milligaretta Iredale, 1936; Psammobia Lamarck, 1818; Psammobia (Gari) Schumacher, 1817; Psammobia (Garum) Dall, 1900 †; Psammobia (Macropsammus) Cossmann, 1902; Psammobia (Psammoica) Dall, 1900 (invalid: junior homonym of Psammoica Solier, 1835 [Coleoptera]; Macropsammus is a replacement name); Psammobia (Psammotaea) Lamarck, 1818; Psammotaea Lamarck, 1818; Psammotea misspelling (incorrect subsequent spelling of Psammotaea Lamarck, 1818à

= Gari (bivalve) =

Genus of bivalves

Gari is a genus of bivalve molluscs in the family Psammobiidae, known as sunset shells.

== Species ==
The following species have been accepted by the database World Register of Marine Species (WoRMS):

- Gari affinis (Dujardin, 1837) †
- Gari amethystus (W. Wood, 1815)
- Gari anomala (Deshayes, 1855)
- Gari appendiculata (Lamarck, 1806) †
- Gari aquitanica (Mayer, 1858) †
- Gari aucklandica Marwick, 1948 †
- Gari baudoni (Deshayes, 1857) †
- Gari brevisinuata (Cossmann, 1886) †
- Gari cacuminata Finlay & Marwick, 1937 †
- Gari caillati (Deshayes, 1857) †
- Gari californica (Conrad, 1849) – California sunset clam
- Gari callosa (Deshayes, 1857) †
- Gari candidula (Deshayes, 1855)
- Gari castrensis (Spengler, 1794)
- Gari chinensis (Deshayes, 1855)
- Gari circe (Mörch, 1876)
- Gari commoda (Yokoyama, 1925)
- Gari consobrina (Deshayes, 1857) †
- Gari convexa (Reeve, 1857)
- Gari costulata (Turton, 1822)
- Gari crassatellaeformis (Cossmann, 1883) †
- Gari crassula (Deshayes, 1855)
- Gari cuisensis (Cossmann, 1883) †
- Gari debilis (Deshayes, 1857) †
- Gari depressa (Pennant, 1777) – large sunset shell
- Gari dickmoli Vervoenen & Nieulande, 2006 †
- Gari dollfusi Cossmann, 1886 †
- Gari donacilla (Deshayes, 1857) †
- Gari dutemplei (Deshayes, 1857) †
- Gari eburnea (Reeve, 1856)
- Gari effusa (Lamarck, 1806) †
- Gari elongata Lamarck
- Gari eos Willan, 1993
- Gari fervensis (Gmelin, 1791) – the Faroe sunset shell
- Gari fucata (Hinds, 1845) – painted sunset clam
- Gari galatheae (Powell, 1958)
- Gari gofasi Cosel, 1990
- Gari gracilenta (E. A. Smith, 1884)
- Gari helenae Olsson, 1961
- Gari inflata (Bertin, 1880)
- Gari insignis (Deshayes, 1855)
- Gari jousseaumeana Bertin, 1880
- Gari juliae Willan & Huber, 2007
- Gari kazusensis (Yokoyama, 1922)
- Gari kenyoniana (Pritchard & Gatliff, 1904)
- Gari lamarckii (Deshayes, 1857) †
- Gari lata (Deshayes, 1855)
- Gari layardi (Deshayes, 1855)
- Gari lessoni (de Blainville, 1826)
- Gari lineolata (Gray, 1835) – pink sunset shell
- Gari livida (Lamarck, 1818)
- Gari loustauae (Cossmann, 1886) †
- Gari maculosa (Lamarck, 1818)
- Gari maxima (Deshayes, 1855)
- Gari micans (Bertin, 1880)
- Gari modesta (Deshayes, 1855)
- Gari neglecta (Deshayes, 1857) †
- Gari nincki (Cossmann, 1913) †
- Gari oamarutica Finlay, 1930 †
- Gari obtusalis (Deshayes, 1825) †
- Gari occidens (Gmelin, 1791)
- Gari oriens (Deshayes, 1855)
- Gari pallida (Deshayes, 1855)
- Gari panamensis Olsson, 1961
- Gari pennata (Deshayes, 1855)
- Gari preangerensis (K. Martin, 1922) †
- Gari pseudoweinkauffi Cosel, 1989
- Gari pulcherrima (Deshayes, 1855)
- Gari pusilla Bertin, 1880
- Gari radiata (Dunker, 1845)
- Gari rasilis (Melvill & Standen, 1899)
- Gari rudis (Lamarck, 1806) †
- Gari sharabatiae Rusmore-Villaume, 2005
- Gari sibogai Prashad, 1932
- Gari solida (Gray, 1828)
- Gari spathula (Deshayes, 1857) †
- Gari squamosa (Lamarck, 1818)
- Gari staadti (Cossmann, 1913) †
- Gari stangeri (Gray, 1843) – painted sunset shell
- Gari tellinella (Lamarck, 1818)
- Gari tellinella (Deshayes, 1824) † (accepted - unreplaced junior homonym, junior homonym of Gari tellinella (Lamarck, 1818)
- Gari tenuicula (Deshayes, 1857) †
- Gari togata (Deshayes, 1855)
- Gari truncata (Linnaeus, 1767)
- Gari vaudini (Deshayes, 1857) †
- Gari virescens (Deshayes, 1855)
- Gari virgata (Lamarck, 1818)

The following species have been found in other databases :

- Gari edentula (Gabb, 1869)
- Gari regularis (Carpenter, 1864)

Synonyms

- Gari bicarinata (Deshayes, 1855): synonym of Gari insignis (Deshayes, 1855)
- Gari granulifera E. Lamy, 1938: synonym of Herouvalia pulchella (H. Adams, 1870)
- Gari intermedia (Deshayes, 1855) : synonym of Gari virgata (Lamarck, 1818)
- Gari linhares Simone, 1998 : synonym of Gari circe (Mörch, 1876)
- Gari ornata (Deshayes, 1854): synonym of Gari maculosa (Lamarck, 1818)
- Gari wenkauffi (Crosse, 1864) : synonym of Gari pallida (Deshayes, 1855)
