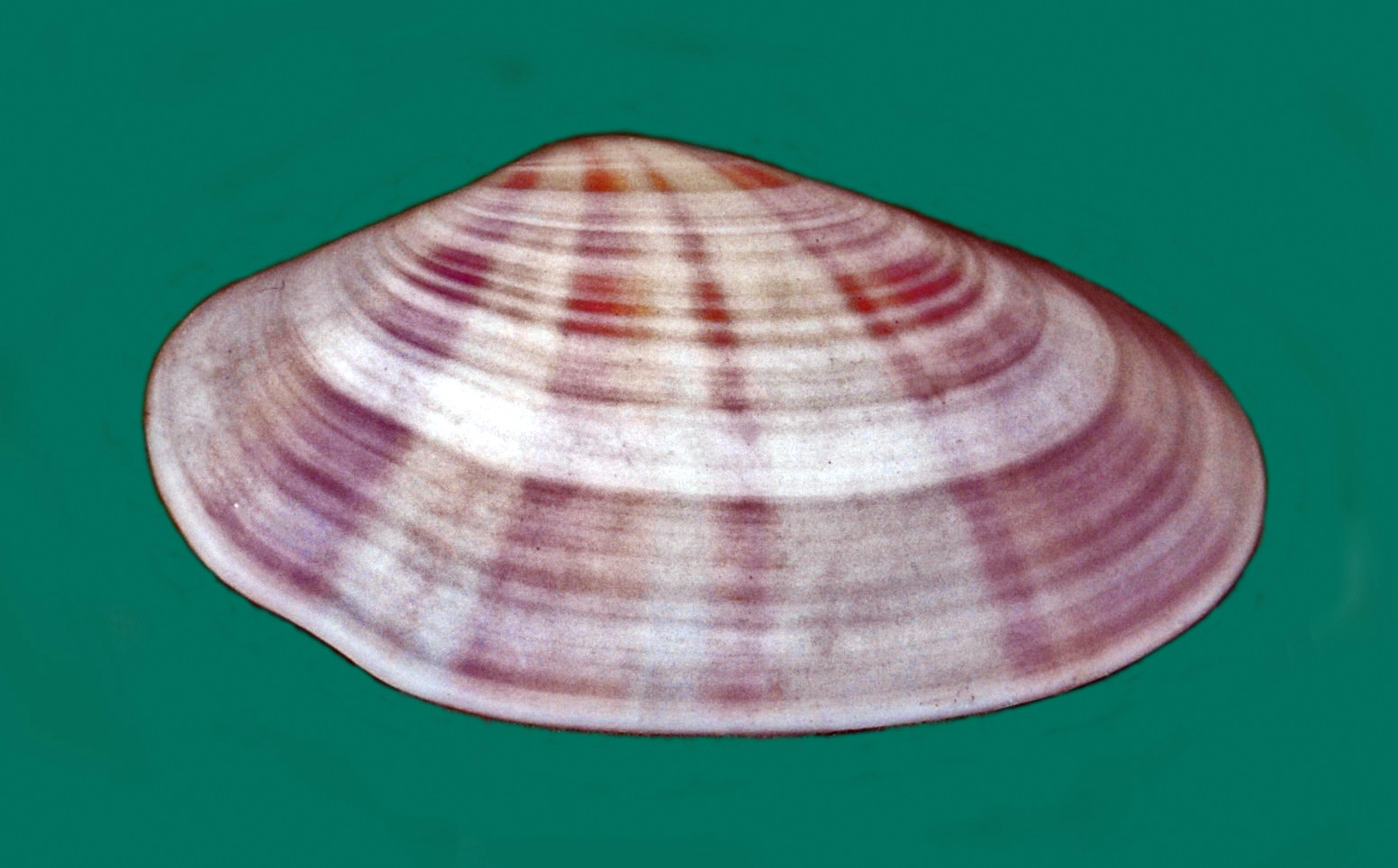
- A view of the external surface of a valve of Tellina radiata
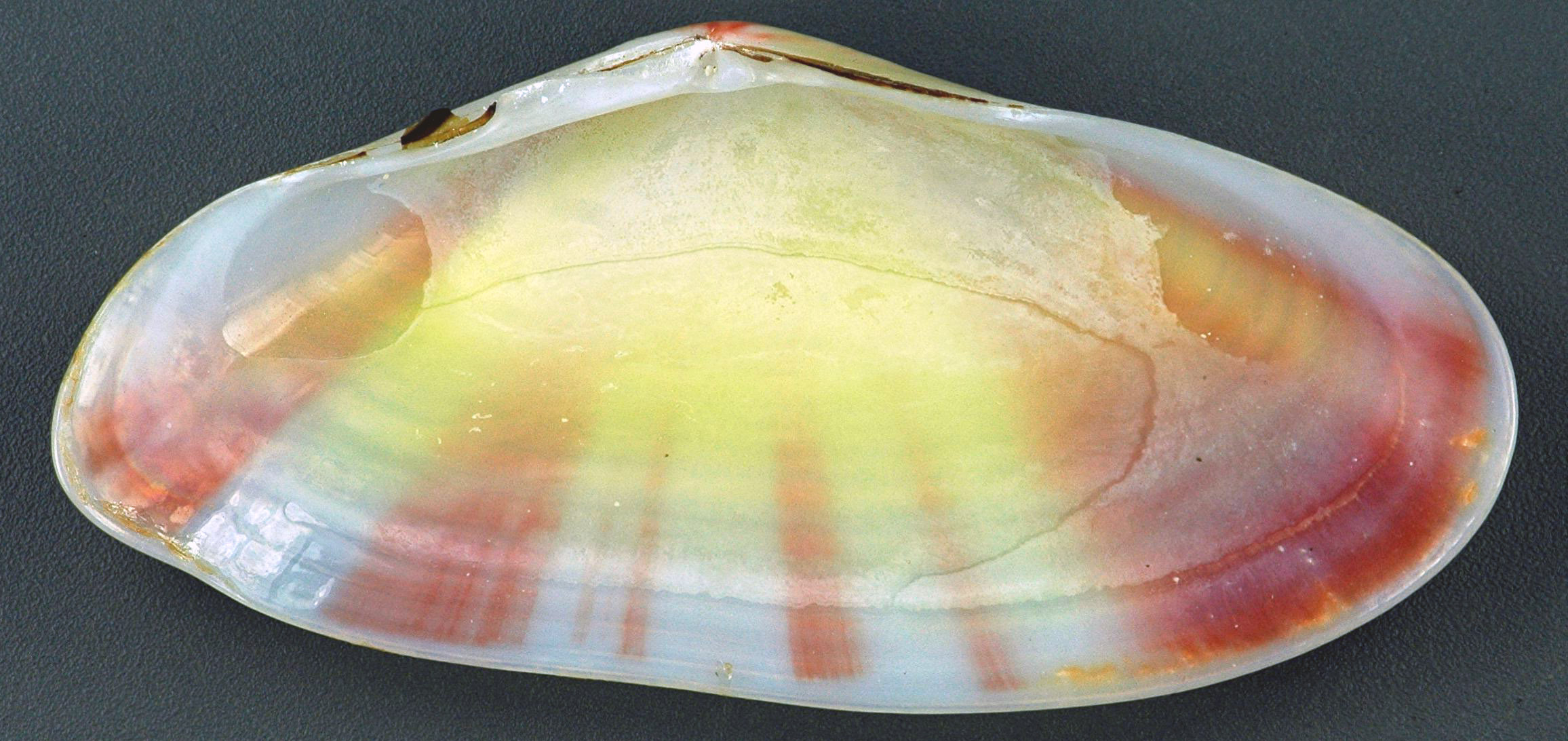
- Interior of a left valve of Tellina radiata

Scientific classification
- Kingdom: Animalia
- Phylum: Mollusca
- Class: Bivalvia
- Order: Cardiida
- Family: Tellinidae
- Genus: Tellina
- Species: T. radiata

Binomial name
- Tellina radiata Linnaeus, 1758

Synonyms
- Tellina unimaculata Lamarck, 1818

= Tellina radiata =

Species of bivalve

Tellina radiata, common name sunrise tellin, is a species of bivalve mollusc in the family Tellinidae, the tellins.

== Description ==
Shell of Tellina radiata can reach a length of 10.5 centimetres (4.1 in). The shells of these bivalves are yellowish-white or pale pinkish, with a smooth and shiny surface. They show a quite variable pattern of pinkish-brown bands radiating from the top to the edges. These bivalves live buried in sand.

Tellina radiata var. unimaculata
Right and left valve of the same specimen:

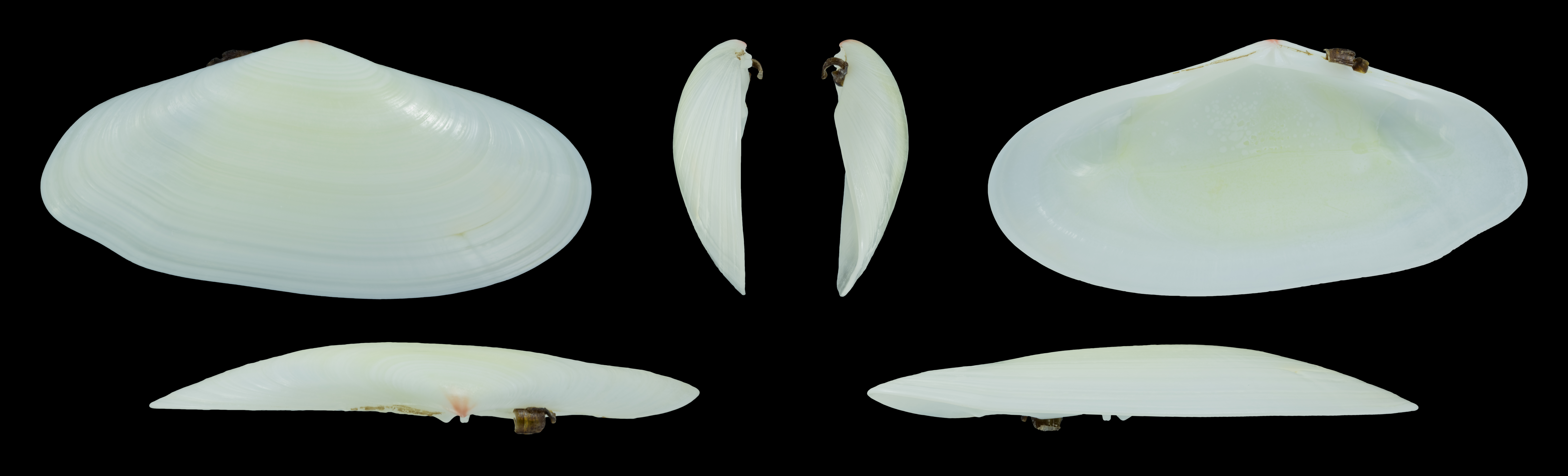
Right valve

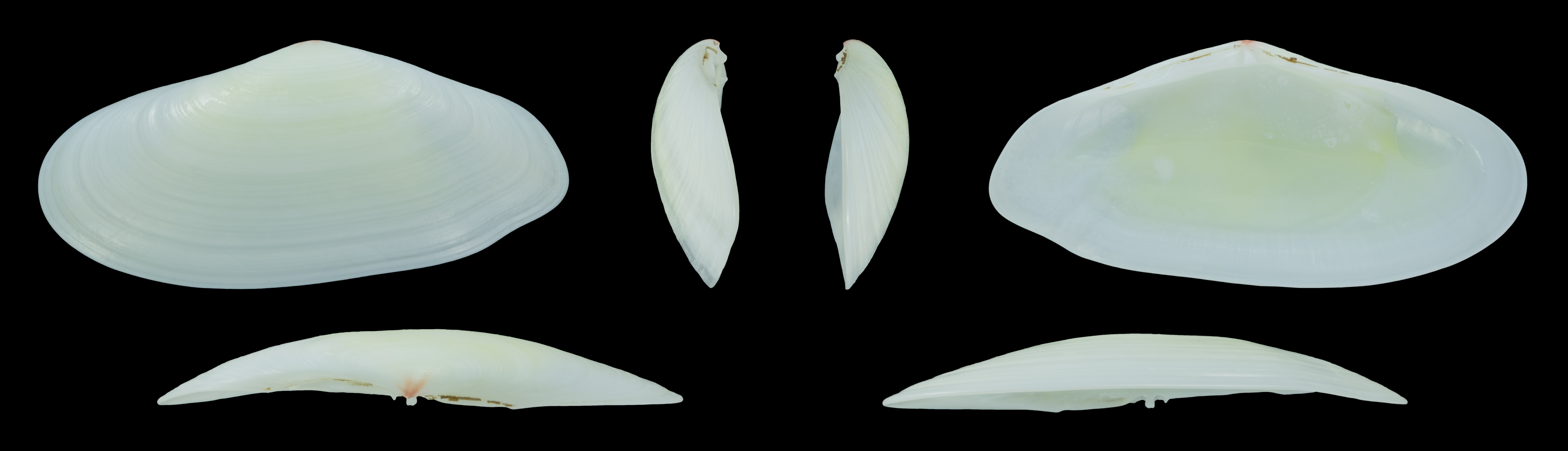
Left valve

== Distribution and habitat ==
The sunrise tellin can be found in eastern North America, including the Caribbean Sea, Colombia, Cuba, Gulf of Mexico, Jamaica. and as far southeast as Barbados. These filter-feeding bivalves inhabit marine and estuarine settings.
