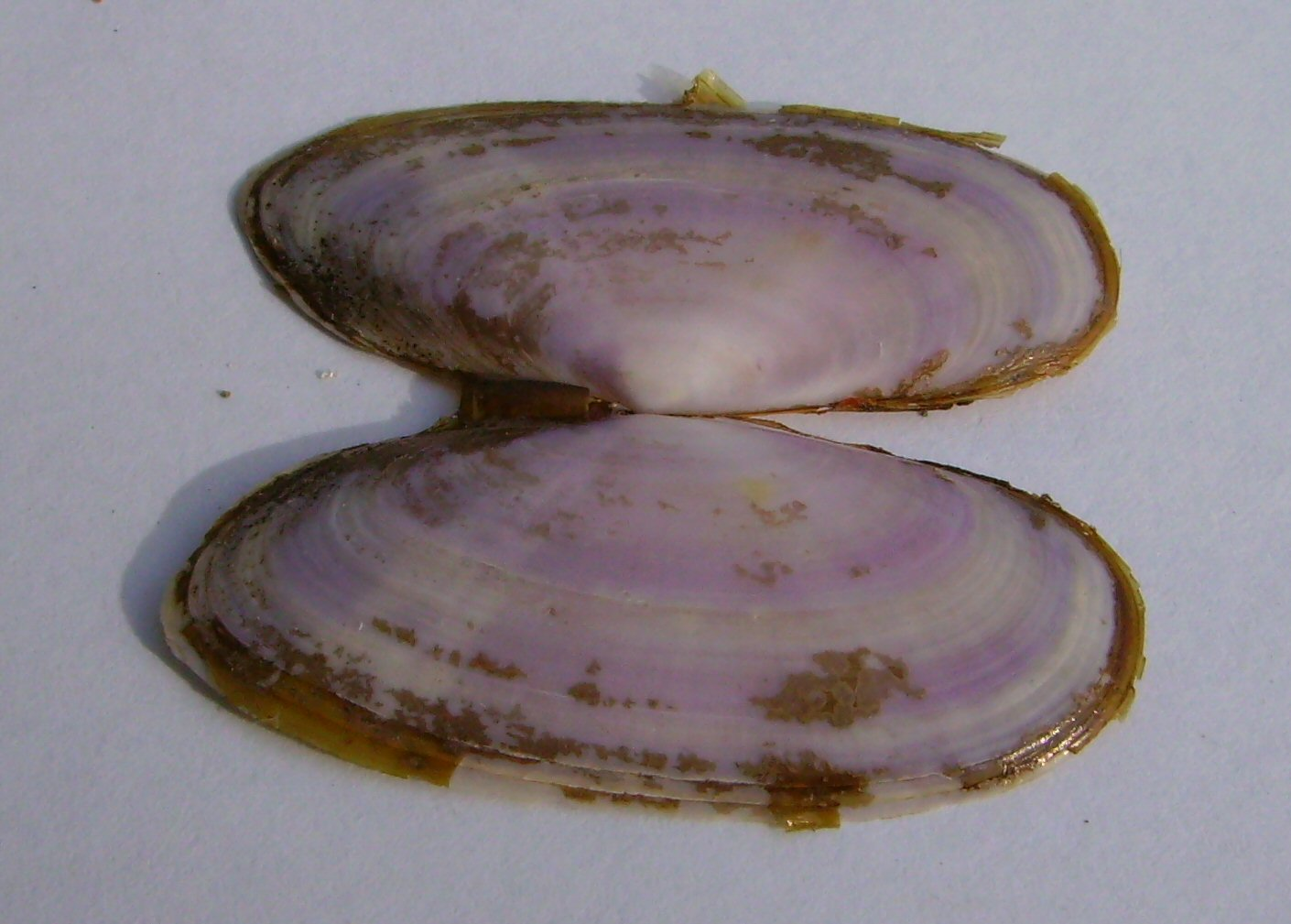
- Hiatula diphos, shining sunset shell

Scientific classification
- Kingdom: Animalia
- Phylum: Mollusca
- Class: Bivalvia
- Order: Cardiida
- Family: Psammobiidae
- Genus: Soletellina; Blainville, 1824

Species
- See text

= Soletellina =

Genus of bivalves

Hiatula is a genus of bivalve molluscs in the family Psammobiidae, known as sunset shells.

== Species in the genus Soletellina ==
- Hiatula acuta
- Hiatula adamsii
- Hiatula ambigua
- Hiatula amianta
- Hiatula atrata
- Hiatula biradiata
- Hiatula boeddinghausi
- Hiatula burnupi
- Hiatula capensis
- Hiatula chinensis
- Hiatula clouei
- Hiatula connectens
- Hiatula consobrina
- Hiatula diphos
- Hiatula gibbonsi
- Hiatula lunulata
- Hiatula nitida
- Hiatula ovalis
- Hiatula petalina
- Hiatula rosea
- Hiatula siliquens
- Hiatula tumens
