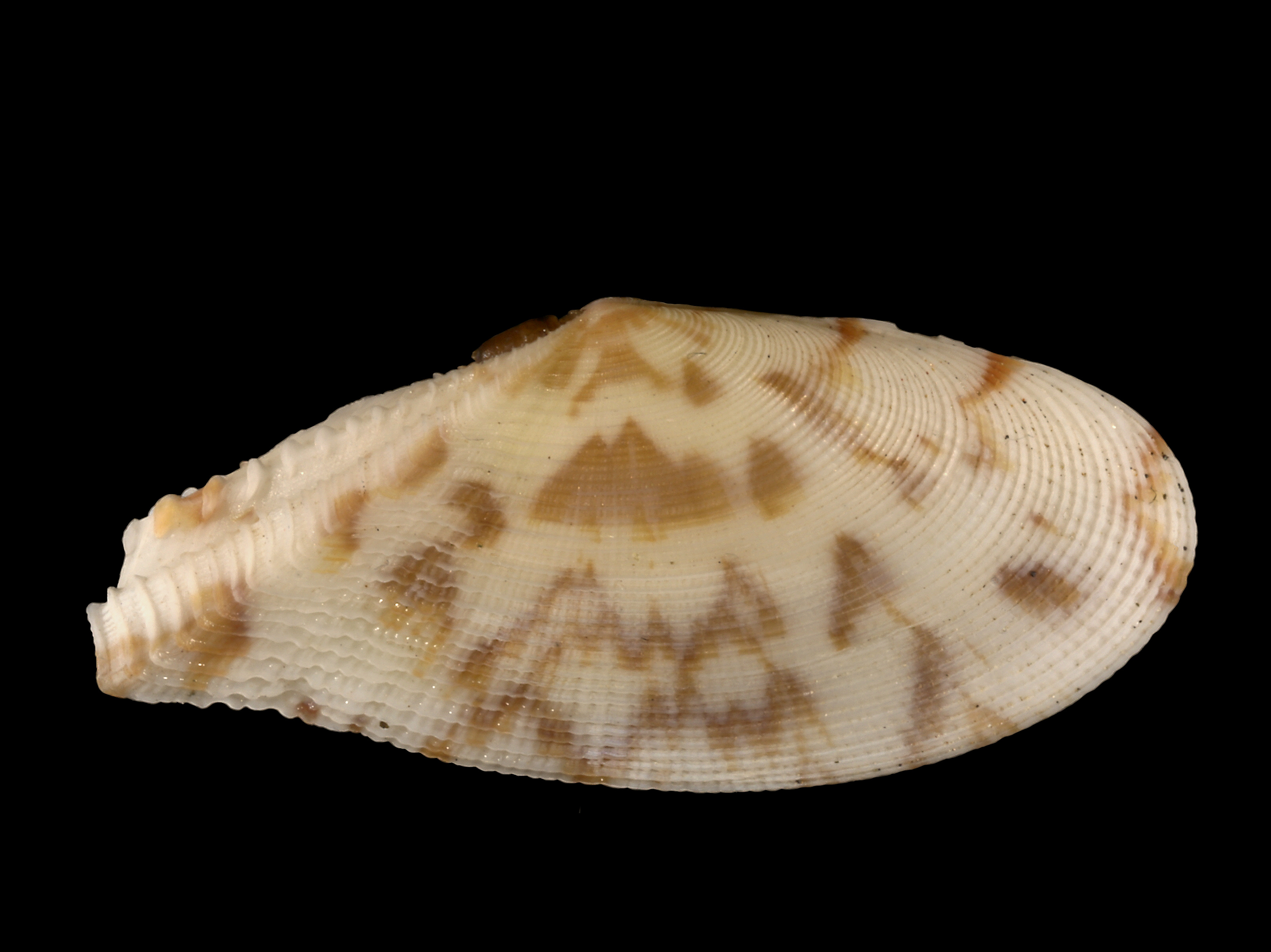
- The right valve of a shell of Tellinella listeri, anterior end towards the right

Scientific classification
- Kingdom: Animalia
- Phylum: Mollusca
- Class: Bivalvia
- Superorder: Imparidentia
- Order: Cardiida
- Superfamily: Tellinoidea; Blainville, 1814

Families
- Donacidae J. Fleming, 1828; †Icanotiidae R. Casey, 1961; Psammobiidae J. Fleming, 1828; †Quenstedtiidae L. R. Cox, 1929; Semelidae Stoliczka, 1870 (1825); Solecurtidae A. d'Orbigny, 1846; †Sowerbyidae L. R. Cox, 1929; †Tancrediidae Meek, 1864; Tellinidae Blainville, 1814; †Unicardiopsidae Chavan, 1969

Synonyms
- Tellinacea

= Tellinoidea =

Superfamily of bivalves

Tellinoidea is a taxonomic superfamily of saltwater clams, marine bivalve molluscs in the order Cardiida.
