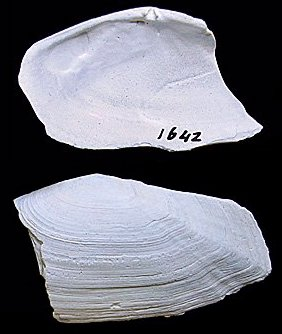
- Fossilized shell fragments of Psammobia fervensis

Scientific classification
- Kingdom: Animalia
- Phylum: Mollusca
- Class: Bivalvia
- Order: Cardiida
- Superfamily: Tellinoidea
- Family: Psammobiidae; Fleming, 1828

Genera
- See text.

Synonyms
- Asaphidae; Garidae; Sanguinolariidae

= Psammobiidae =

Family of bivalves

The Psammobiidae, or sunset clams, are a family of medium-sized saltwater clams, marine bivalve molluscs of the order Cardiida.

These genera are accepted by the database World Register of Marine Species:

- Asaphis Modeer, 1793
- Gari Schumacher, 1817
- Heterodonax Mörch, 1853
- Heteroglypta Martens in Möbius, 1880
- Nuttallia Dall, 1900
- Psammosphaerica Jousseaume, 1894
- Psammotella Herrmannsen, 1852
- Sanguinolaria Lamarck, 1799
- Soletellina Blainville, 1824
