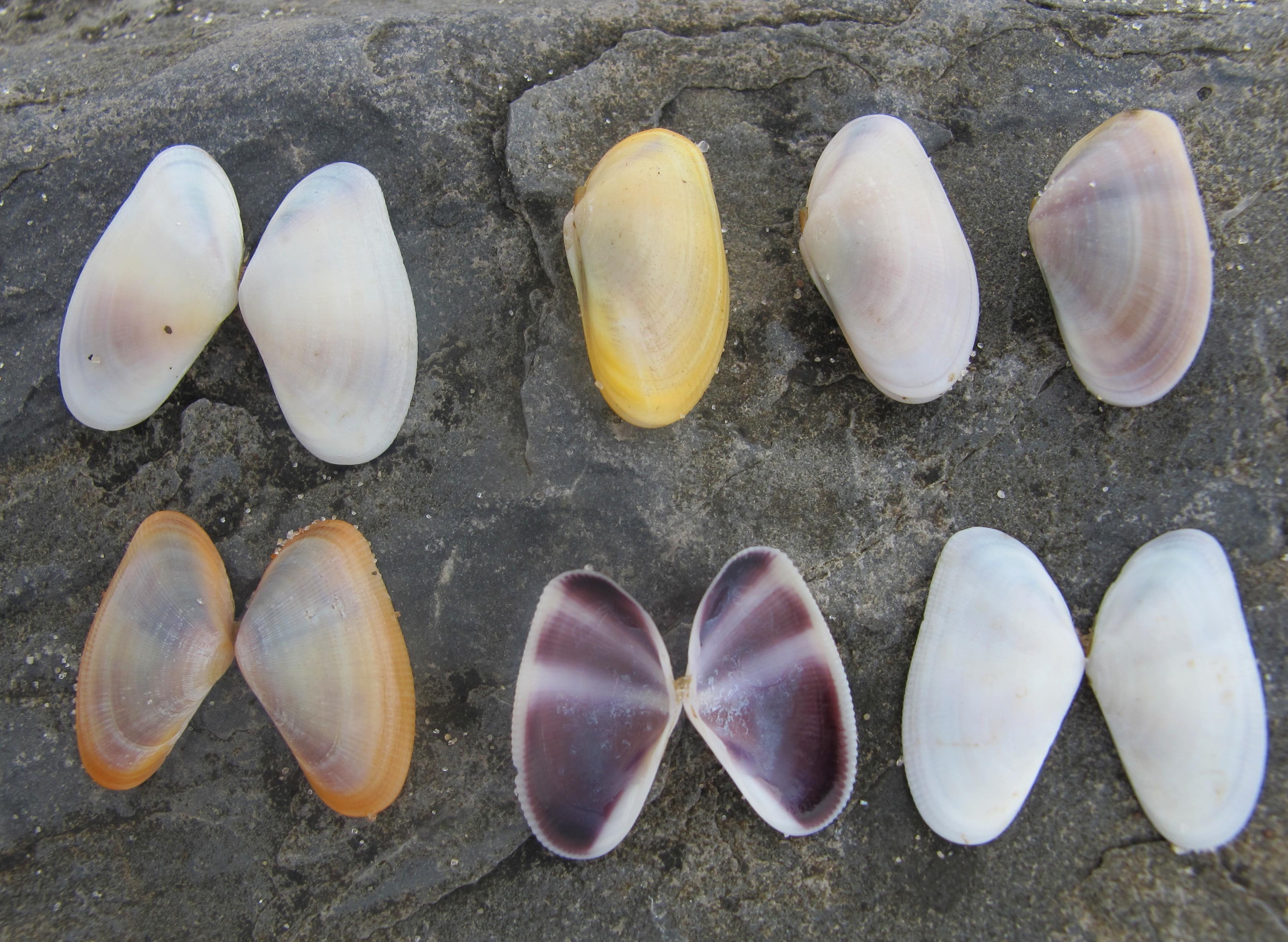
- Donax fossor upper right 3 intact individuals, paired valves, 1 interior, largest pair lower right (white) 21.2 mm in length

Scientific classification
- Domain: Eukaryota
- Kingdom: Animalia
- Phylum: Mollusca
- Class: Bivalvia
- Order: Cardiida
- Family: Donacidae
- Genus: Donax
- Species: D. fossor

Binomial name
- Donax fossor Say, 1822

= Donax fossor =

Species of mollusc

Donax fossor is a species of small saltwater clam, a marine bivalve mollusc species in the family Donacidae. This species is native to the eastern coast of the US, as far north as New York State; in the past it was sometimes incorrectly considered to be a northern, less colorful form of Donax variabilis.

== Description ==
This small clam was reported in the literature to attain a maximum length of 18 mm. The shell can be almost white in color, or yellow, orange, greyish, or purplish. The darker shells may be rayed with purple on the inside, but these rays are usually only rather faintly visible on the outside.

== Distribution ==
Donax fossor lives from the coast of New York State south through New Jersey, Maryland, Virginia, and North Carolina, to East Florida.

== Biology ==
In New Jersey, on exposed beaches, this small bivalve often has the hydroid Lovenella gracilis growing on the posterior tip of the shell. There is some evidence that this protects the clam against predation attempts by the moonsnail Neverita duplicata.
