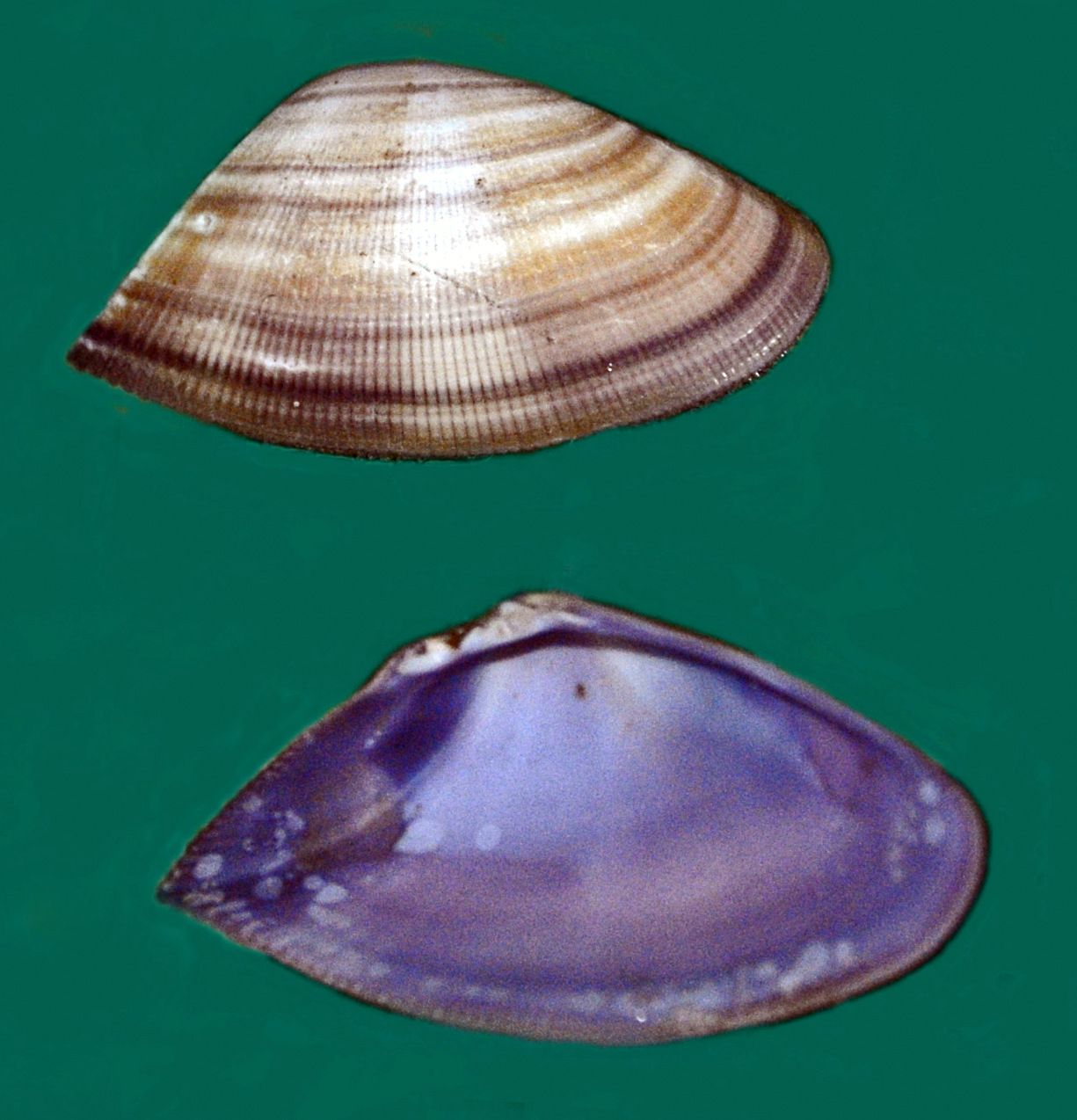
- A view of valves of Donax carinatus

Scientific classification
- Domain: Eukaryota
- Kingdom: Animalia
- Phylum: Mollusca
- Class: Bivalvia
- Order: Cardiida
- Family: Donacidae
- Genus: Donax
- Species: D. carinatus

Binomial name
- Donax carinatus Hanley, 1843

Synonyms
- Donax carinatus palaius Woodring, 1982; Donax culminatus Carpenter, 1857; Donax rostratus Adams, 1852

= Donax carinatus =

Species of bivalve

Donax carinatus is a species of small saltwater clam, a marine bivalve mollusc species in the family Donacidae.

== Description ==
Shells of Donax carinatus can reach a length of 39 millimetres (1.5 in), a height of 22 millimetres (0.87 in) and a diameter of 15 millimetres (0.59 in). These shells are triangular-shaped, elongated, with a strong sculpture and anteriorly rostrated. The basic color of the external surface is purple and yellowish brown, with a purple interior.

== Distribution ==
This species is present from Mexico to Colombia, in depths to 24 m.
