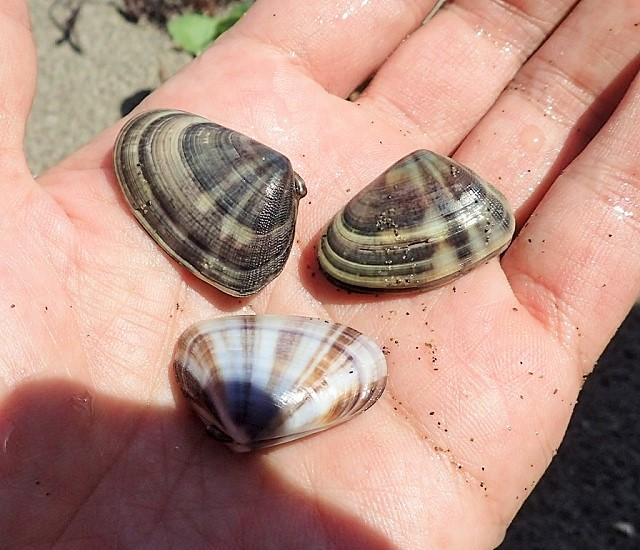

Scientific classification
- Kingdom: Animalia
- Phylum: Mollusca
- Class: Bivalvia
- Order: Cardiida
- Family: Donacidae
- Genus: Donax
- Species: D. cuneatus

Binomial name
- Donax cuneatus Linnaeus, 1758

= Donax cuneatus =

Species of bivalve

Donax cuneatus, the cradle donax or cuneate wedge shell, is a species of small saltwater clam, a marine bivalve mollusc species in the family Donacidae.

== Distribution ==
This species is reported from the Seychelles, Sri Lanka, India, Malaysia, Vietnam, Indonesia, China, the Philippines, Australia, New Caledonia, Fiji, and Vanuatu.

== Description ==
Right and left valve of the same specimen:

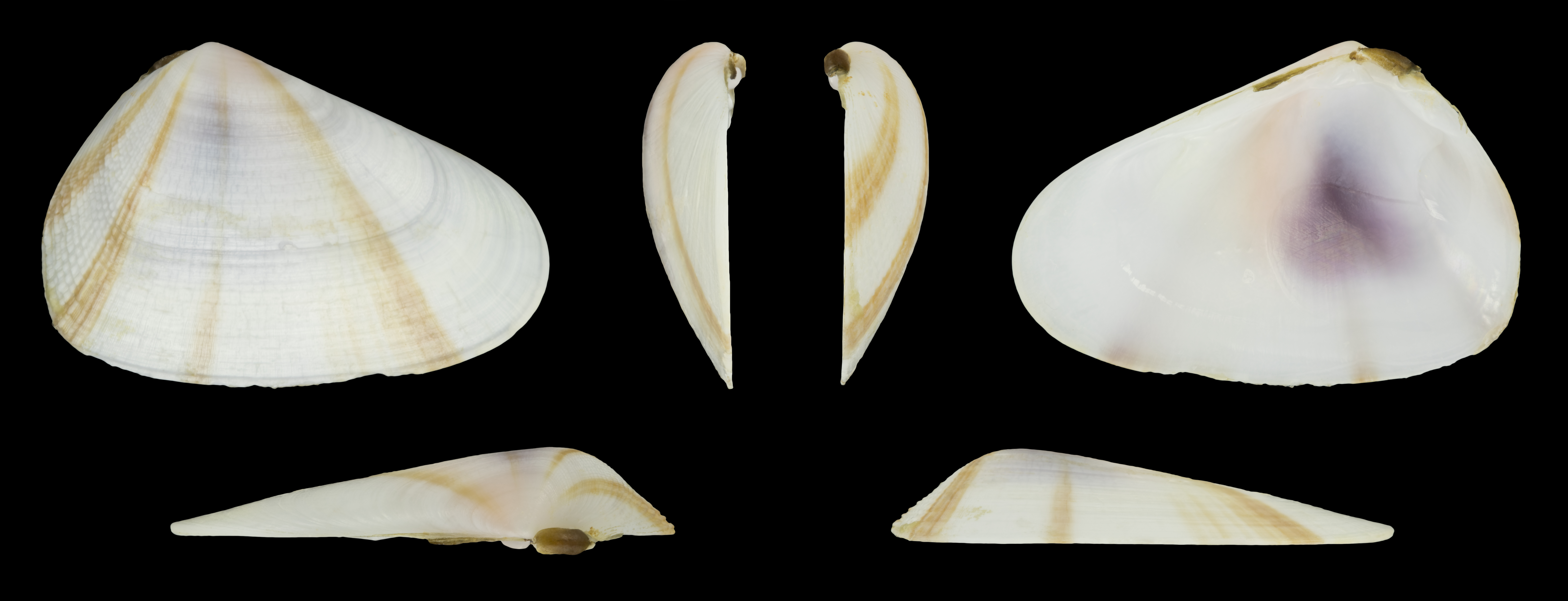
Right valve

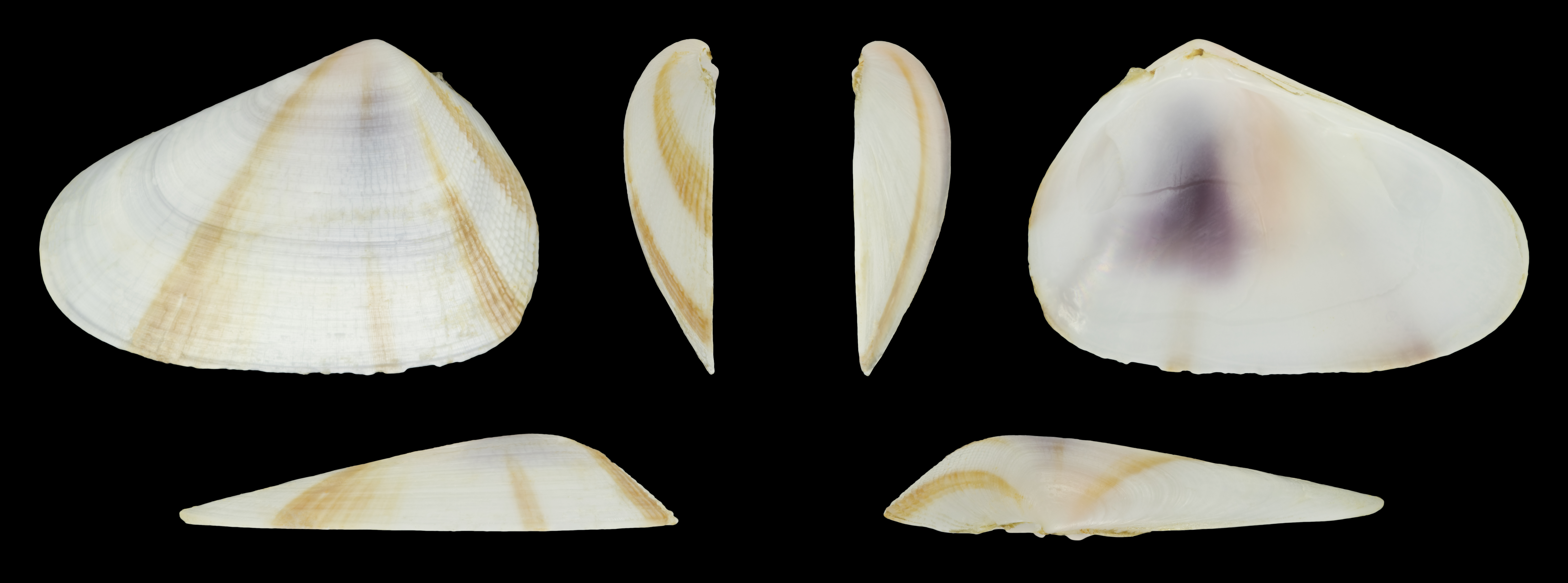
Left valve

The species inhabits the intertidal zone. The shells are shiny grayish white, with brownish or purple bands radiating from the umbos. As is typical in the wedge clams, Donax cuneatus is triangular and compressed, with the anterior end more rounded than the posterior end. The shell is medium-sized, 12mm at reproductive maturity up to a maximum size of 23mm. The exterior of the shell is shiny and sculptured with fine concentric ridges and threadlike radial ridges, except on the posterior end which is more rugose. Lunules are found on both valves. In the interior of the shell, the exceptionally large pallial sinus is indicative of the long siphons of bivalves that dig themselves deep into sand or mud substrates. In some areas Donax cuneatus is harvested by indigenous people as a minor subsistence food.
