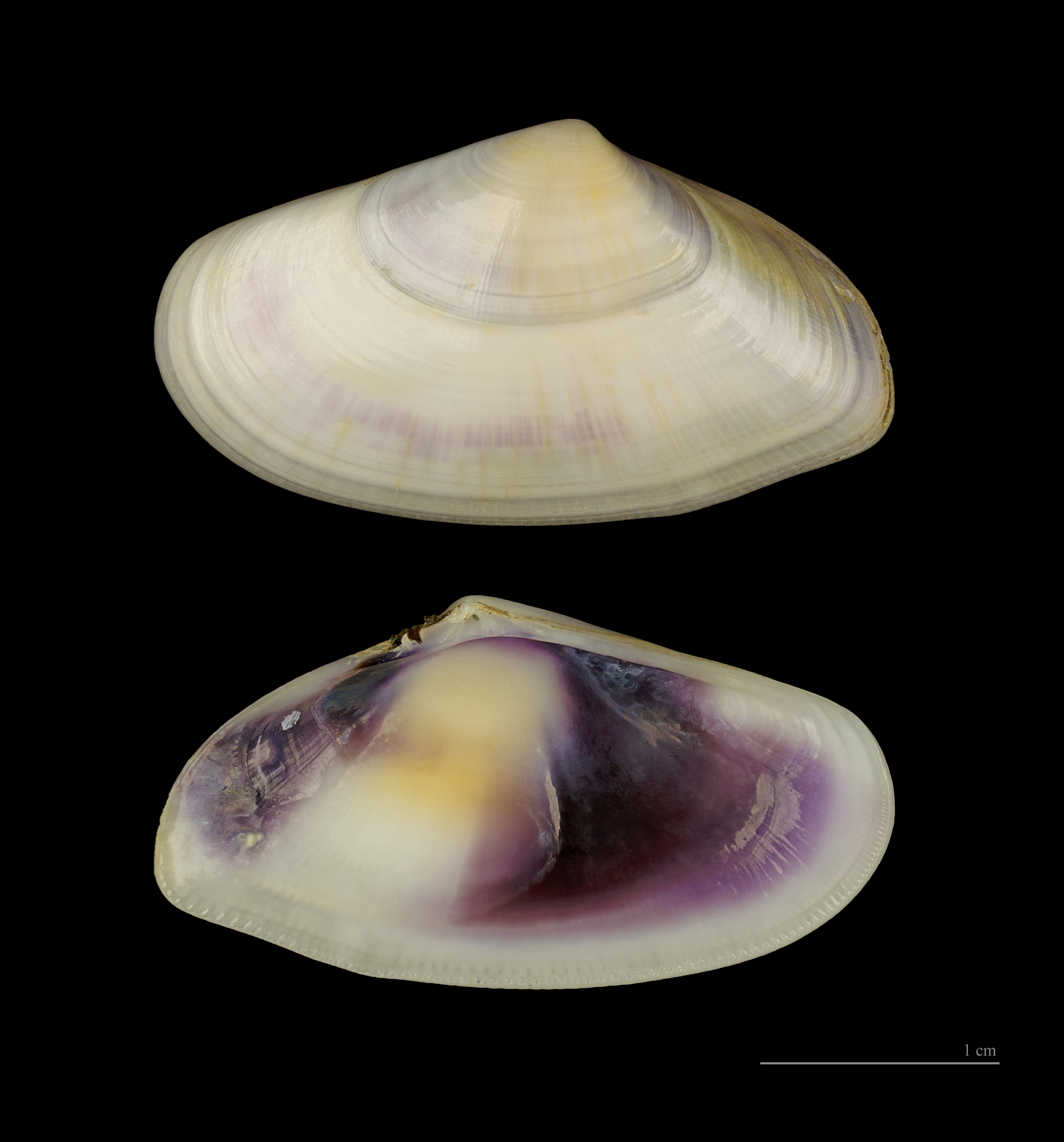
- Donax trunculus, left valve

Scientific classification
- Kingdom: Animalia
- Phylum: Mollusca
- Class: Bivalvia
- Order: Cardiida
- Family: Donacidae
- Genus: Donax
- Species: D. trunculus

Binomial name
- Donax trunculus Linnaeus, 1758

= Donax trunculus =

Species of bivalve

The truncate donax, abrupt wedge shell, wedge clam or coquina clam (Donax trunculus), is a bivalve species in the family Donacidae.

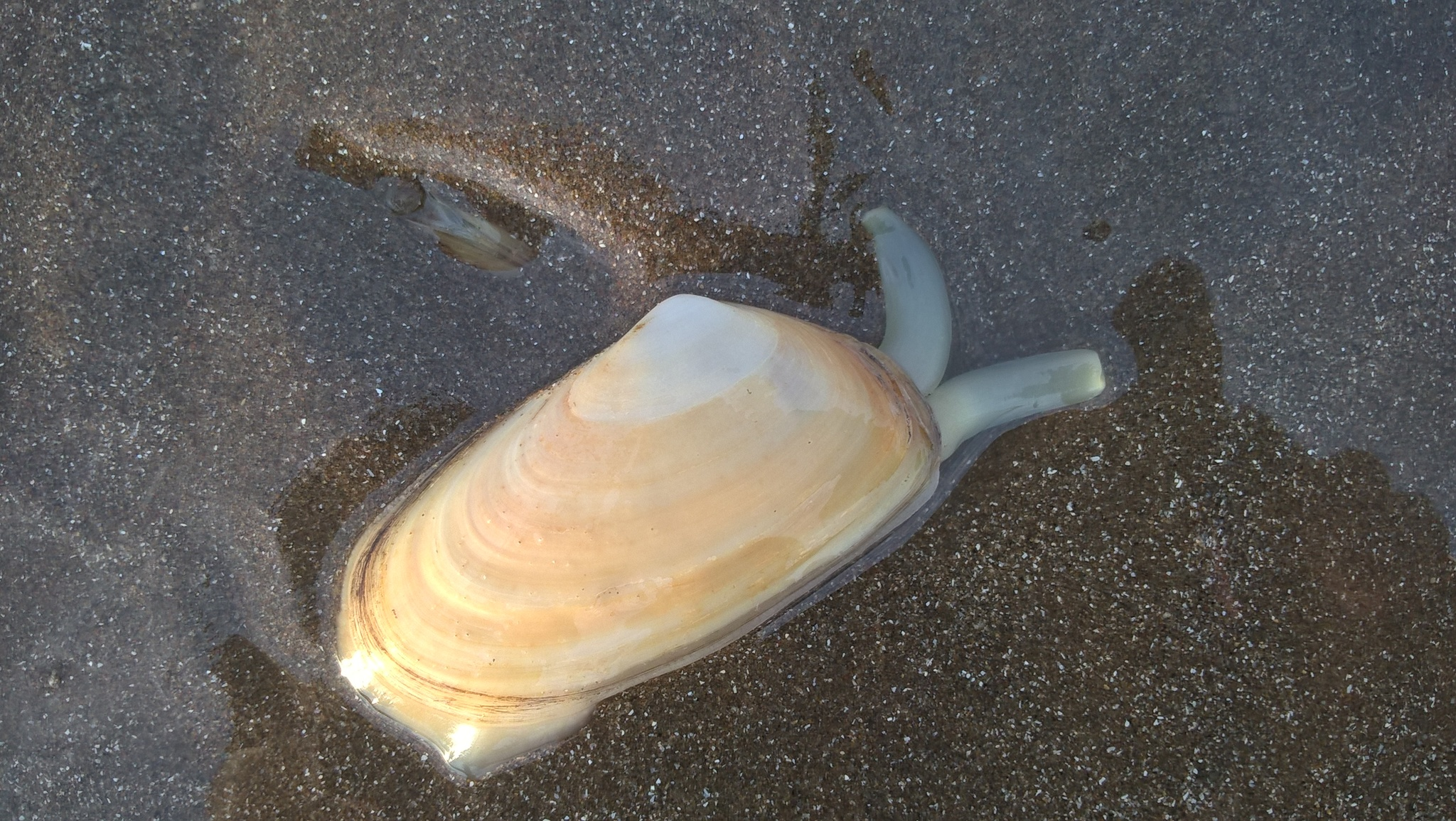
Wedge clam on the beach

It is native to the Mediterranean and Atlantic coasts of western Europe, as well as the Red sea, where it is consumed as a food. The wedge clam prefers to live at depths of 0-2m and in clean, fine, and well sorted sand. These clams are efficient and rapid burrowers, and their survival relies heavily on the composition of the sand they burrow in. Their burrowing times vary based on the coarseness of the sand, which reflects their prevalence in these fine-sanded environments. The wedge clam is a popular food item for human consumption, but can carry heavy metals and hydrocarbon contaminations. As they are commonly consumed raw or lightly cooked, these contaminants are commonly present at the time of consumption. Despite this, the wedge clam is an efficient bioindicator of heavy metals and hydrocarbon contaminants in their environment.

With this species, as with many in its family Donacidae, it is easy to mistake the orientation of the valves, that is, to locate wrong the anterior and posterior ends of the animal and thus to mistake the right valve for the left one and vice versa (if there's no soft body left to give a reference), because the wedge clam's valves have some distinct features which are the opposite to what we see in the majority of the bivalves and can lead to confusion if we try to orientate the valves using these: first, Donax's umbo points backwards, towards the posterior end (instead of pointing forward, which is the common thing to happen in other bivalve families such as Veneridae); second, the anterior half of the valve (if you divide the valve in two by tracing a transverse axis from the umbo's point) is bigger, broader, more elongate, extends further away, while the posterior half is much shorter and reduced, which is exactly the opposite to the norm. However, if we ignore these unusual features, the valve can be readily oriented if we are able to make out the impression of the pallial sinus on the internal face of the valve: the pallial sinus, which is quite deep and prominent in this species, always opens towards the posterior end of the animal, with no exception.

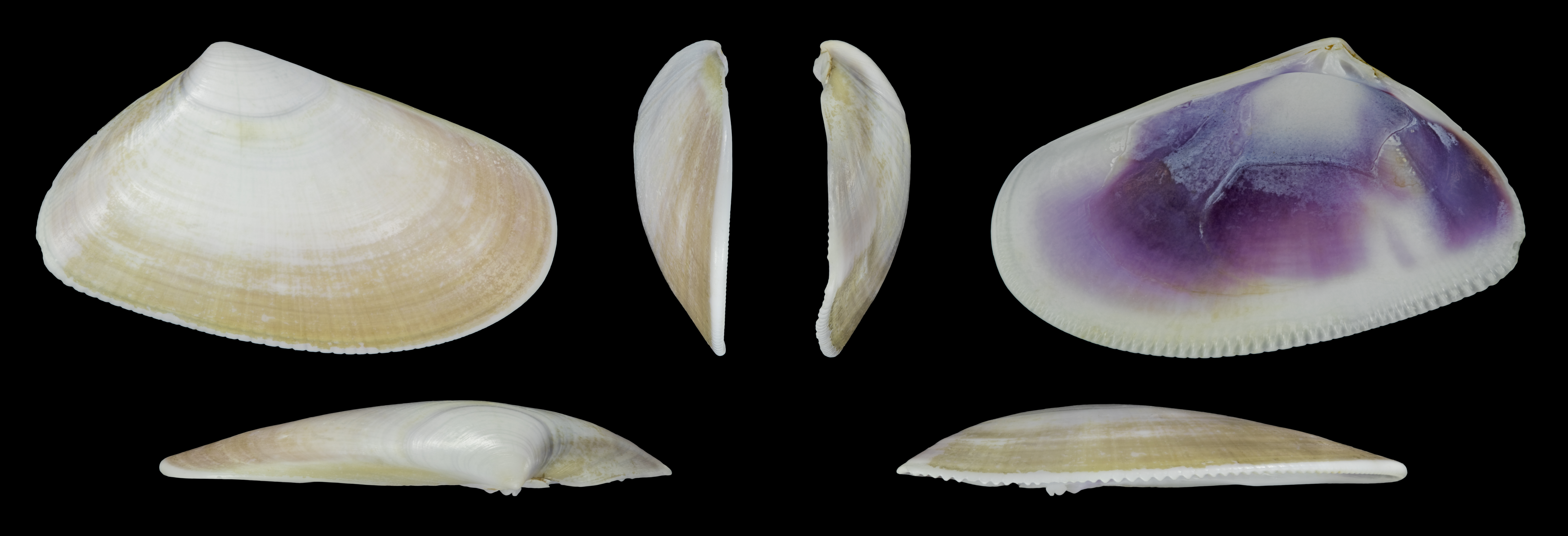
Donax trunculus trunculus
right valve

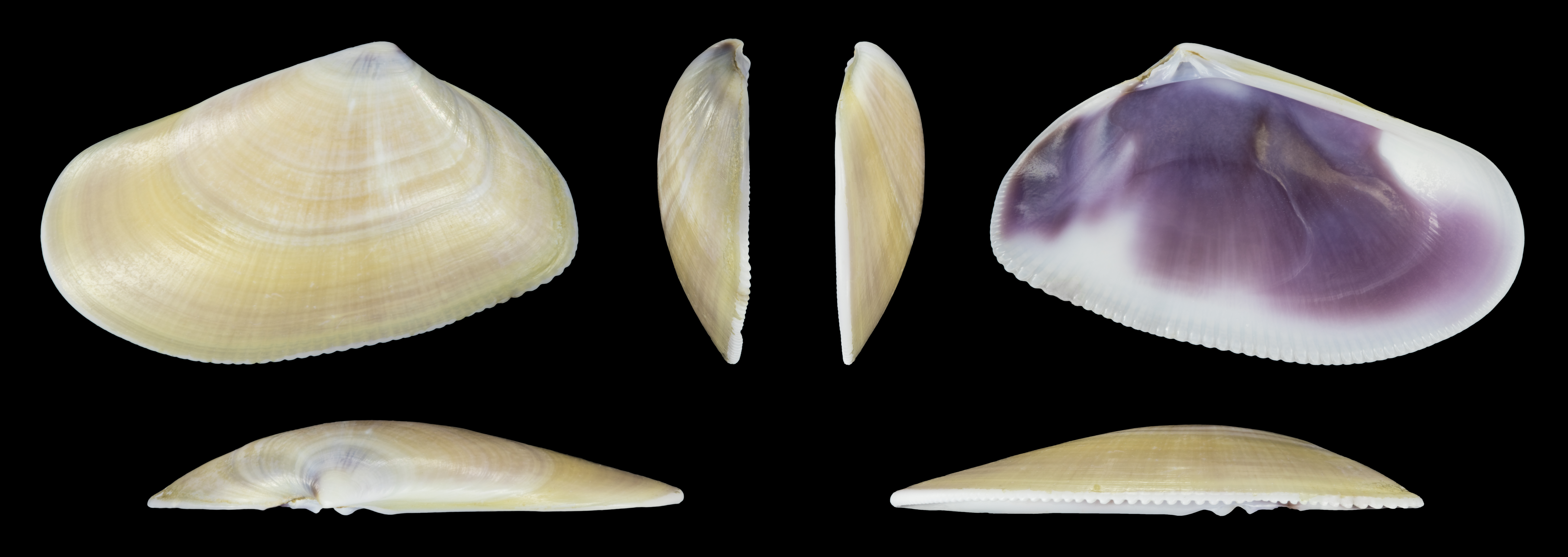
Donax trunculus trunculus
left valve
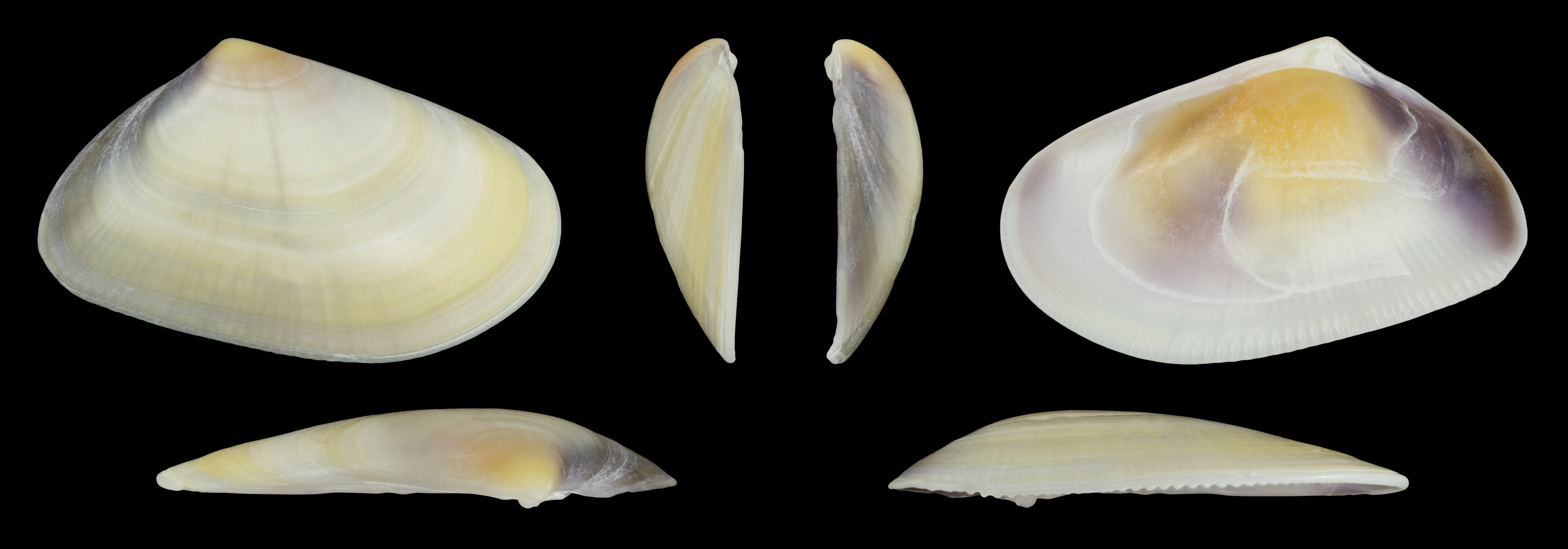
Donax trunculus trunculus var. flaveolus
right valve

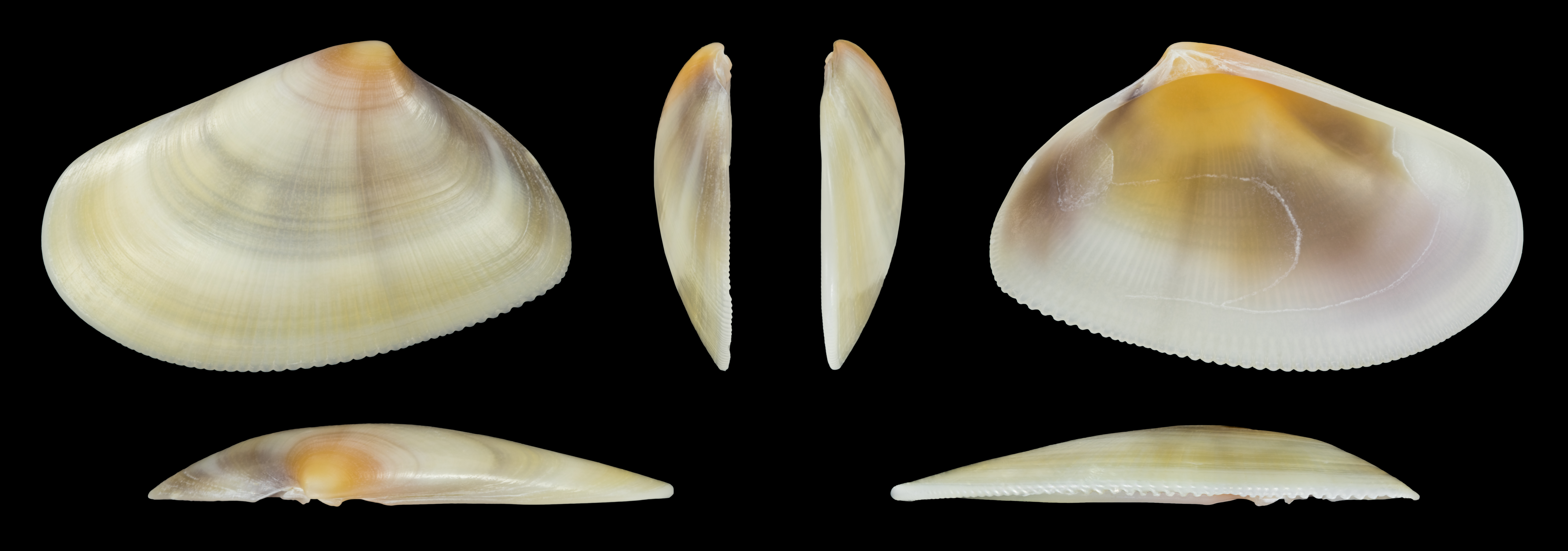
Donax trunculus trunculus var. flaveolus
left valve
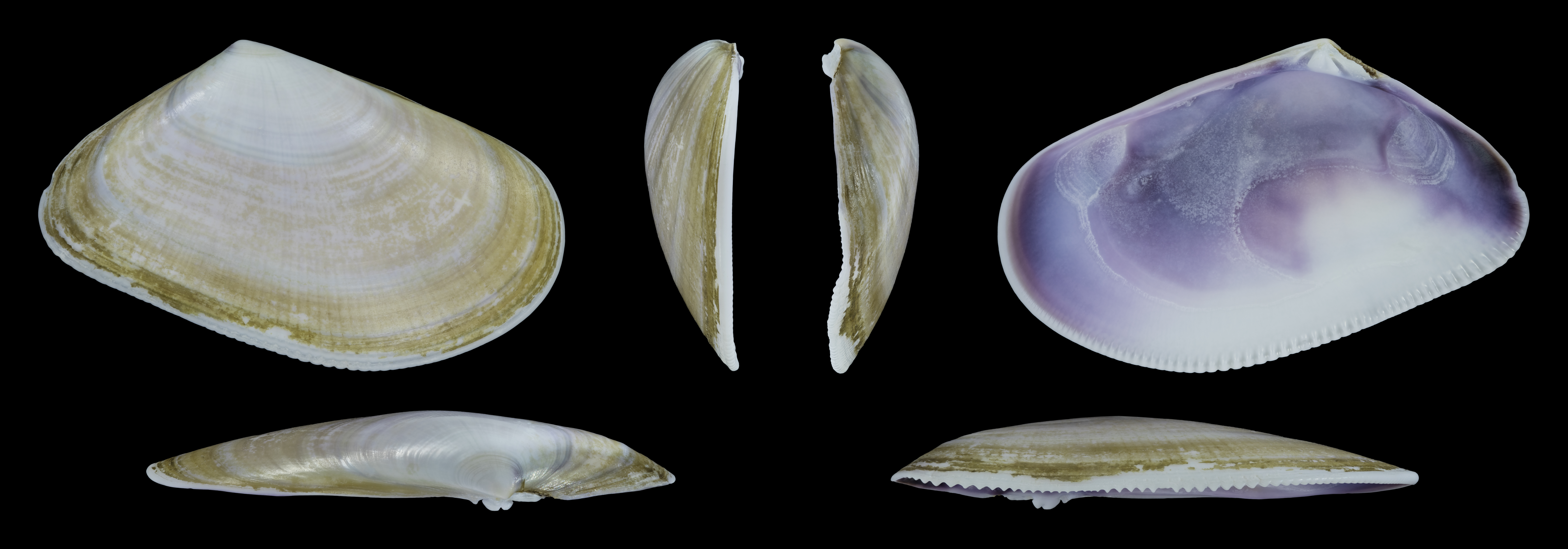
Donax trunculus trunculus var. subplanus
right valve

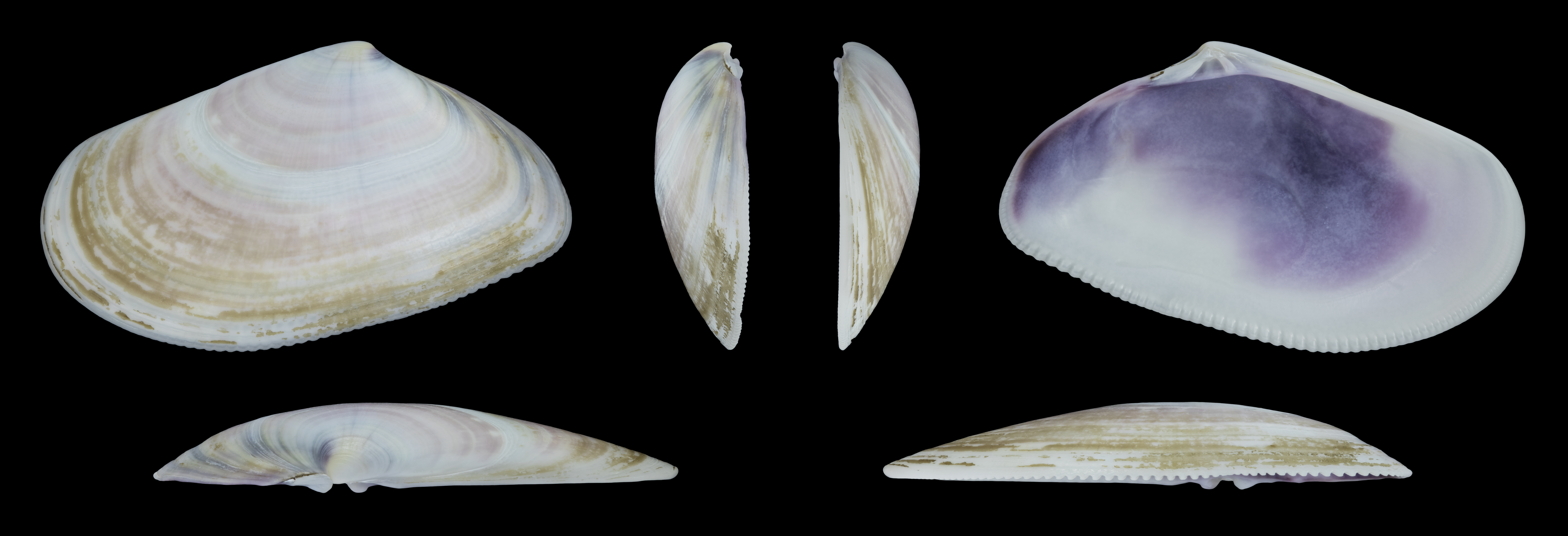
Donax trunculus trunculus var. subplanus
left valve
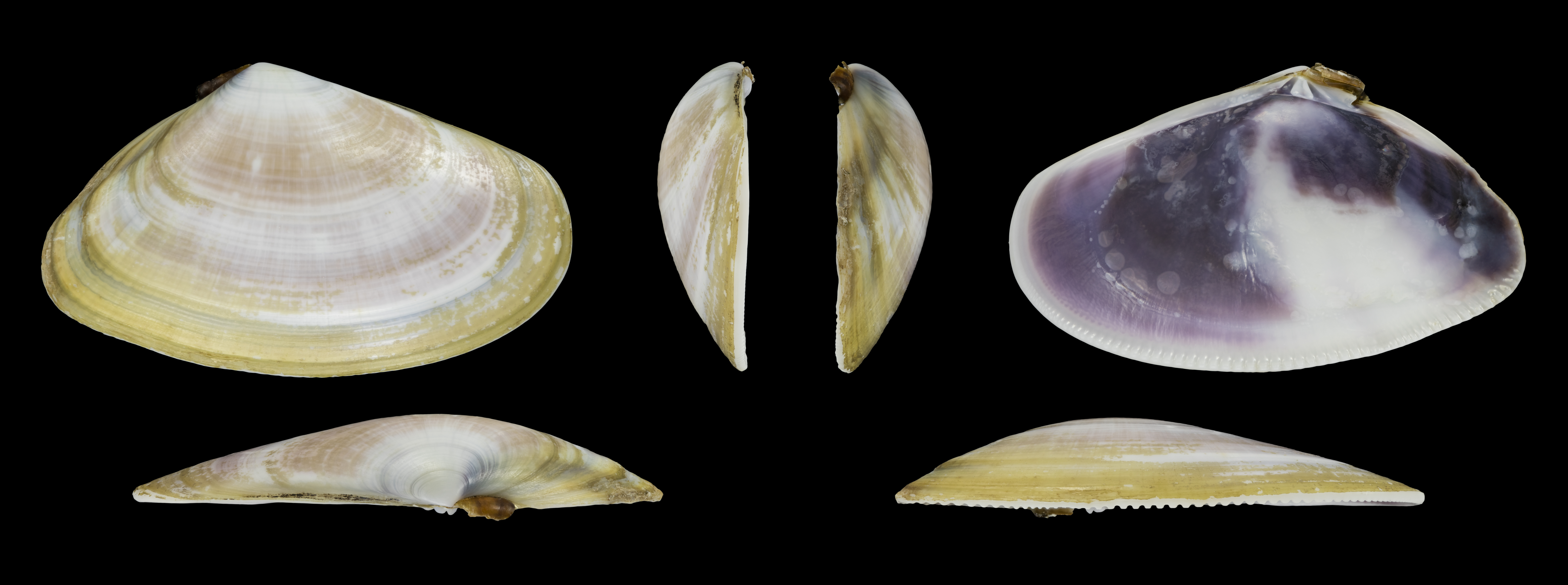
Donax trunculus adriaticus
right valve

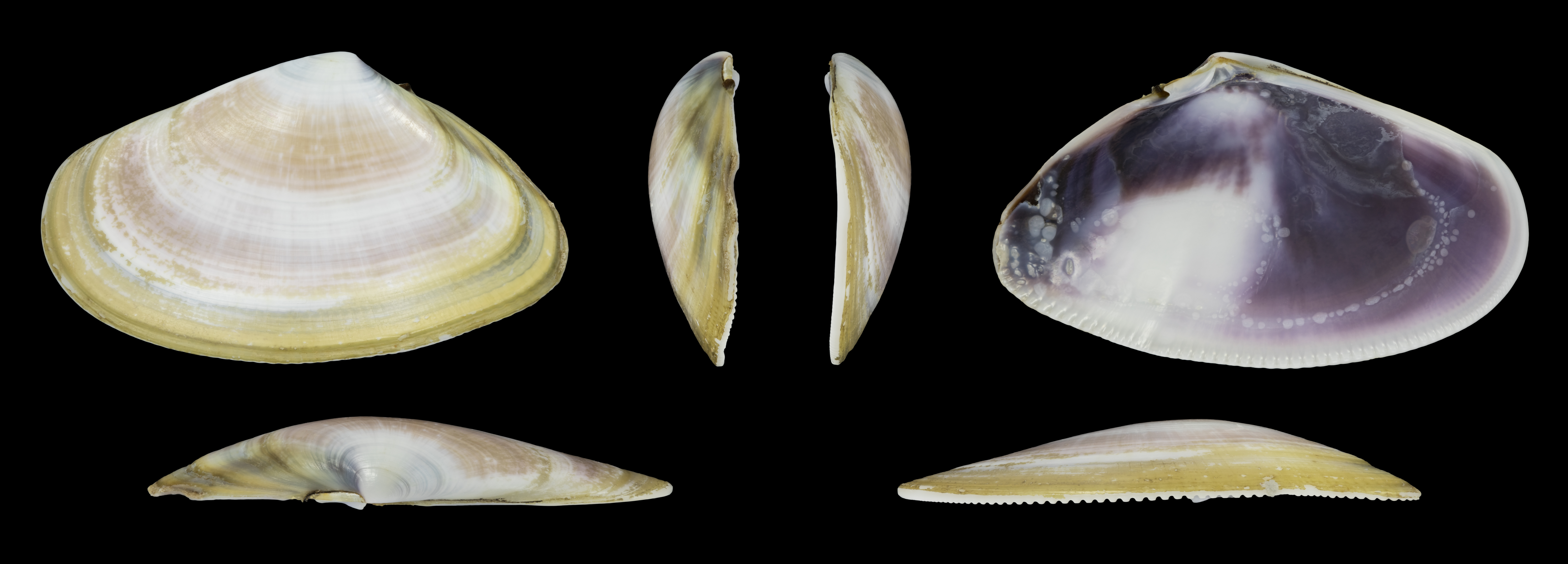
Donax trunculus adriaticus
left valve
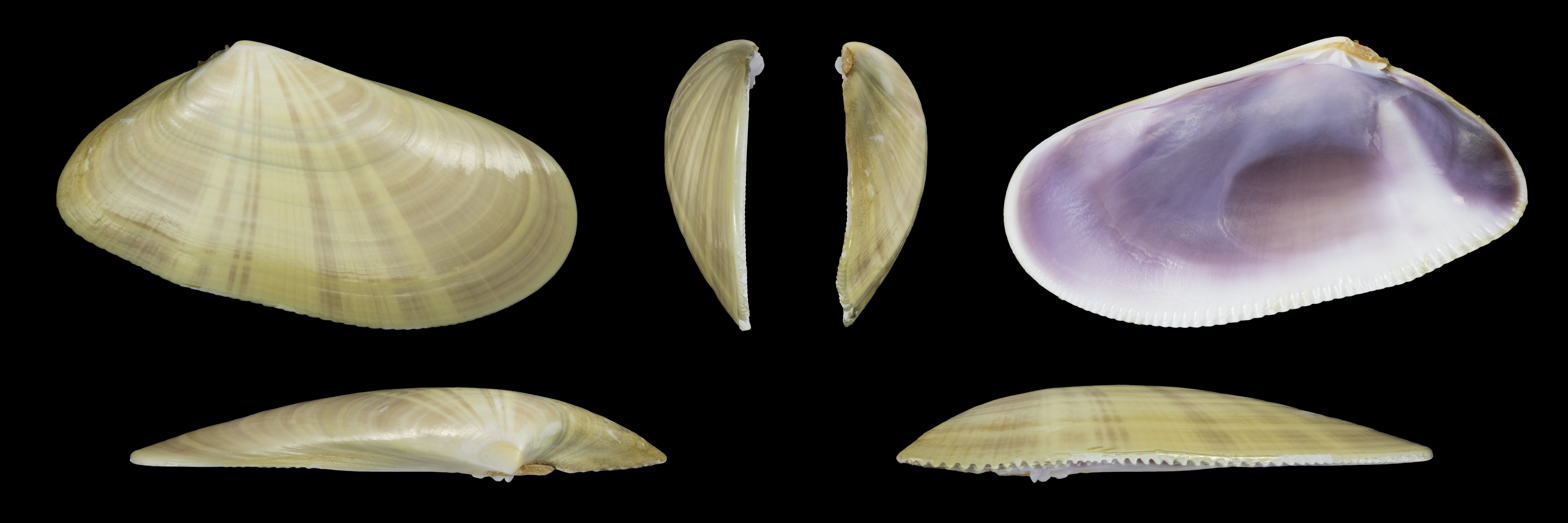
Donax trunculus anatinus
right valve

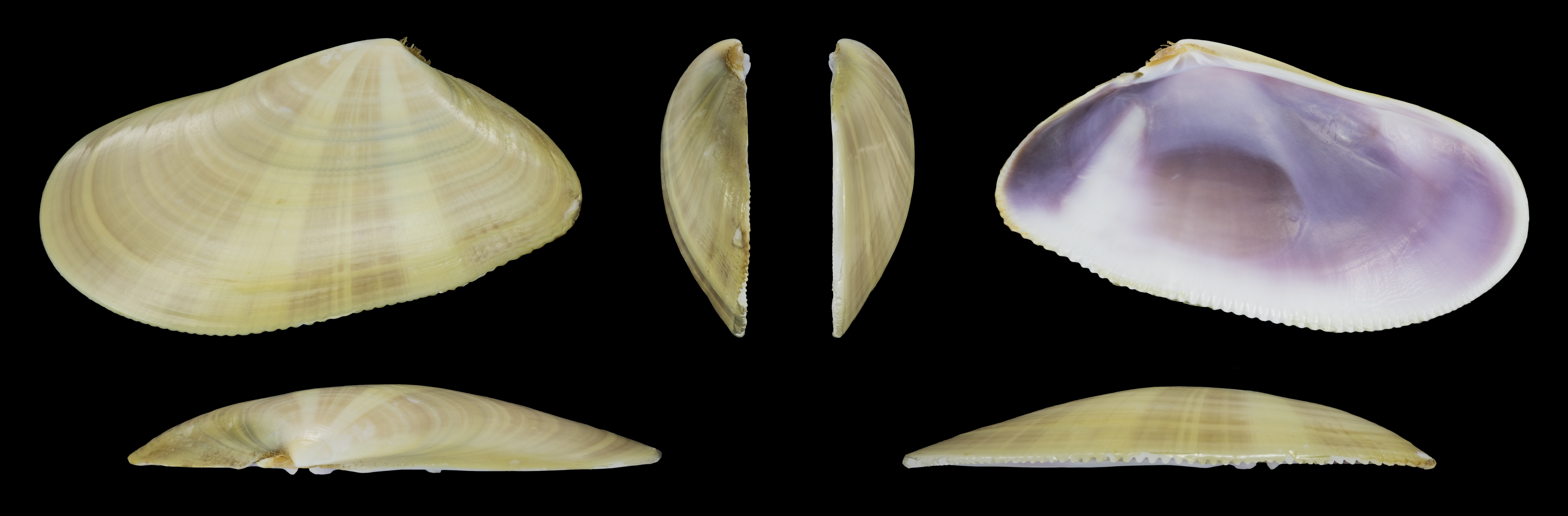
Donax trunculus anatinus
left valve

== Names in other languages ==
It is locally known as flion, flion tronqué, olive de mer, haricot de mer or telline (among other names) in French, lagagnon in the area of Arcaishon and Les Landes, cadelucha in the Bayonne region, which coincides with the Basque name of kadeluxa; tellin, tellina, telline, tenille or truille in the Occitan-speaking area of the Mediterranean, tellina or arsella in Italian, tellerina, tellina or escopinya francesa in Catalan (the latter variant used on Menorca), jòcula cautxa in Catalan of the Alguerès variant, coquina truncada or coquina in Spanish,cadelucha, coquina or navalliña in Galician, conquilha or cadelinha in Portuguese and Um El-Kholol in Egyptian Arabic, etc. In Australia, a very similar shellfish is locally known as "Pippies".
