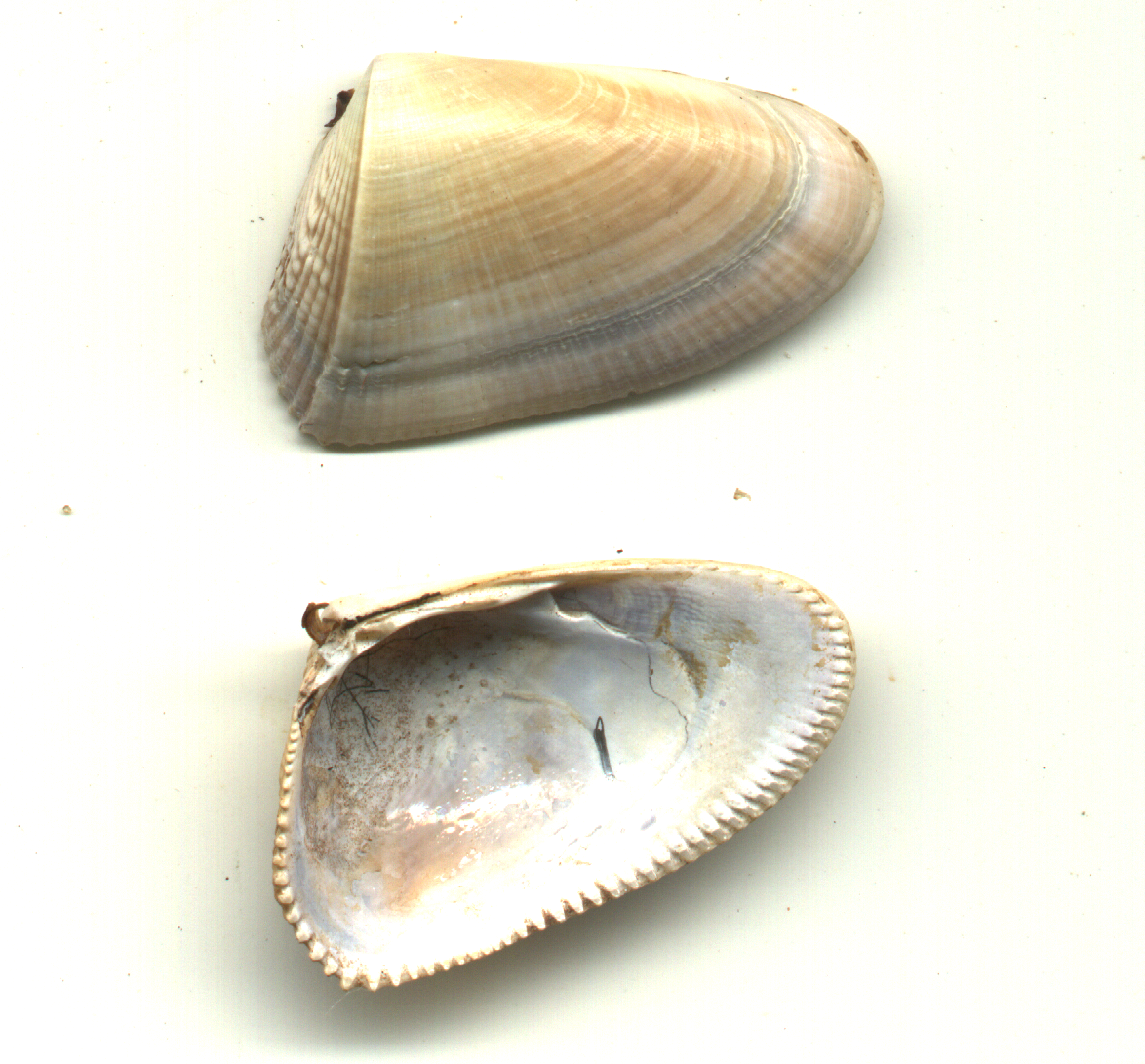

Scientific classification
- Kingdom: Animalia
- Phylum: Mollusca
- Class: Bivalvia
- Order: Cardiida
- Family: Donacidae
- Genus: Donax
- Species: D. hanleyanus

Binomial name
- Donax hanleyanus (Philippi, 1847)

= Donax hanleyanus =

Species of bivalve

Donax hanleyanus, common name the wedge clam (in Argentina and Uruguay known as: berberecho; in Brazil (at least in Rio de Janeiro state) known as: sarnambi), is a marine bivalve mollusk species in the family Donacidae, the bean clams or wedge shells. It is widely distributed throughout the sandy beaches of the Atlantic coast of South America, from Brazil to Argentina. The Donax Hanleyanus is a productive member within the Argentinian ecosystems and is considered a keystone species, carrying out their crucial ecological role in nutrient cycling and therefore benefiting its cohabitants. This animal cleans the water with its filter feeding abilities, and its role of stabilizing sentiment allows better accessibility for oxygen to flow through the waters. While small and not very pleasing to the eye, this animal is an incredibly important component for the ecosystem within its habitat.

Right and left valve of the same specimen:

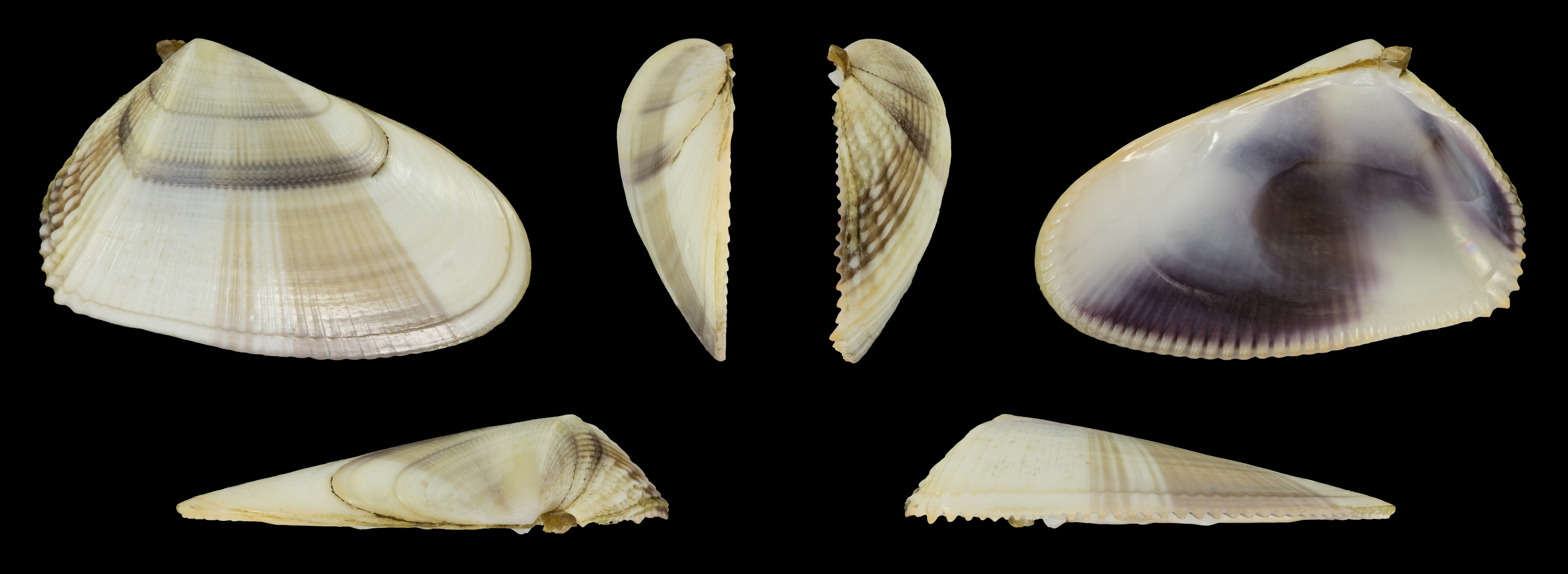
Right valve

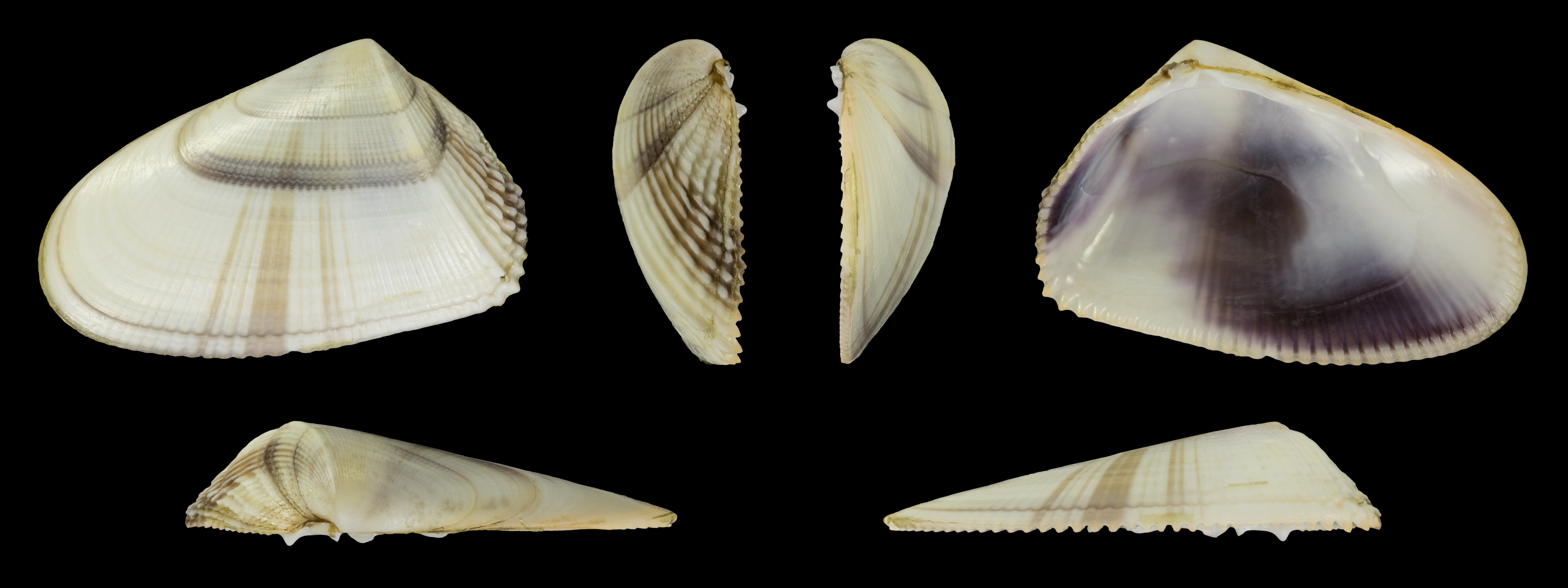
Left valve
