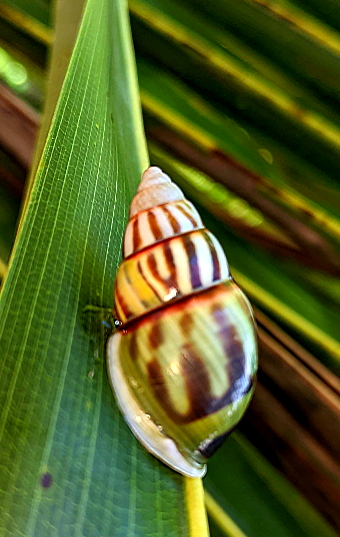
- Live specimen of Amphidromus andamanicus andamanicus

Scientific classification
- Kingdom: Animalia
- Phylum: Mollusca
- Class: Gastropoda
- Order: Stylommatophora
- Family: Camaenidae
- Genus: Amphidromus
- Species: A. andamanicus

Binomial name
- Amphidromus andamanicus (Hanley & Theobald, 1876)

Synonyms
- Bulimus andamanicus Hanley & Theobald, 1876 (original combination)

= Amphidromus andamanicus =

Species of tree snail

Amphidromus andamanicus is a species of air-breathing tree snail, an arboreal gastropod mollusk in the family Camaenidae.

Subspecies

- Amphidromus andamanicus andamanicus (Hanley & Theobald, 1876) (synonym: Amphidromus furcillatus, var. andamanica, Fulton, A. M. N. H).
- Amphidromus andamanicus nicobaricus Godwin-Austen, 1895 (basionym: Amphidromus andamanicus var. nicobarica Godwin-Austen, 1895)

== Description ==
The height of the shell attains 35 mm, its diameter 19 mm.

This sinistral shell is elongate-conical, smooth, and glossy, exhibiting fine striations and minute, close-set spiral lines. The protoconch is white or buff-white with a pale or dark brown apex. Subsequent whorls are pale or dark buff, marked with broad, transverse (sometimes oblique) dark brown or blackish bars, occasionally forked at the upper extremity. These bars widen and become more spaced on later whorls, then decrease and become crowded on the body whorl. The lower half of the body whorl features two broad spiral bands, one infra-peripheral and the other around the columella, sometimes coalescing. The distal part of the body whorl may display light or dark green, occasionally arranged in transverse streaks. A narrow brown sub-sutural band, edged with white, ascends most of the spire. Whorls number 9 to 9.75 and are convex. The semi-ovate aperture is three-sevenths the shell's length. The peristome is white, rather thin, and slightly expanded, but not reflexed. The parietal callus is very thin. The columella is white, vertical, straight, forming a distinct angle with the basal margin, reflexed and adnate at the insertion, leaving a slight, narrow umbilical slit.

This sinistral shell is characterized by a body whorl with green stripes on a yellowish ground, and a reddish-brown sutural band. The spire is buff, displaying oblique chestnut stripes that are simple, not forked above. The first three or four whorls are uniformly buff. The aperture is white, featuring a broad purple-lake band above the columella.

The subspecies Amphidromus andamanicus nicobaricus was described as somewhat larger than the Andaman shells, and in color is far paler, and with few markings, and those pale.

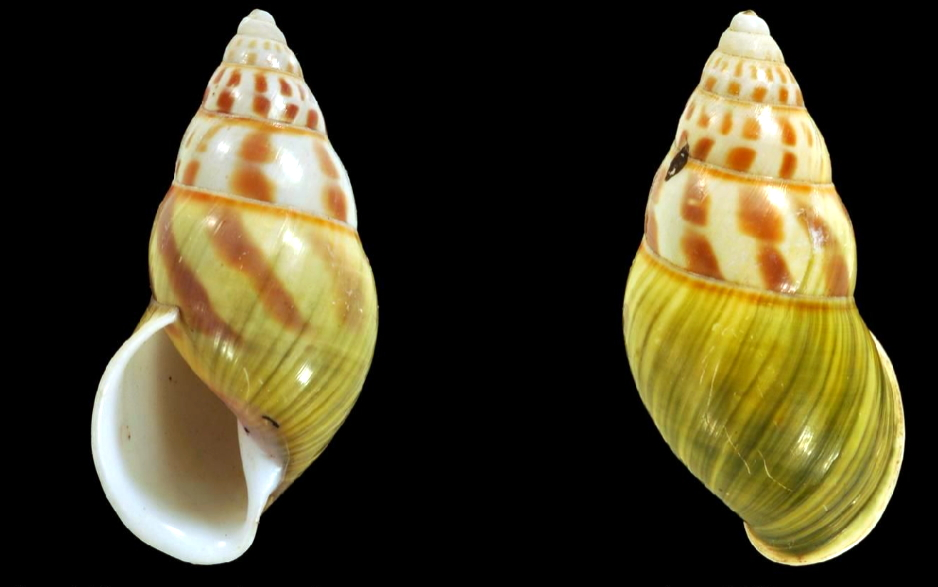
Shell of Amphidromus andamanicus nicobaricus (holotype at the Natural History Museum, London

== Distribution ==
This species is endemic to Andaman Islands and the Nicobar Islands.
