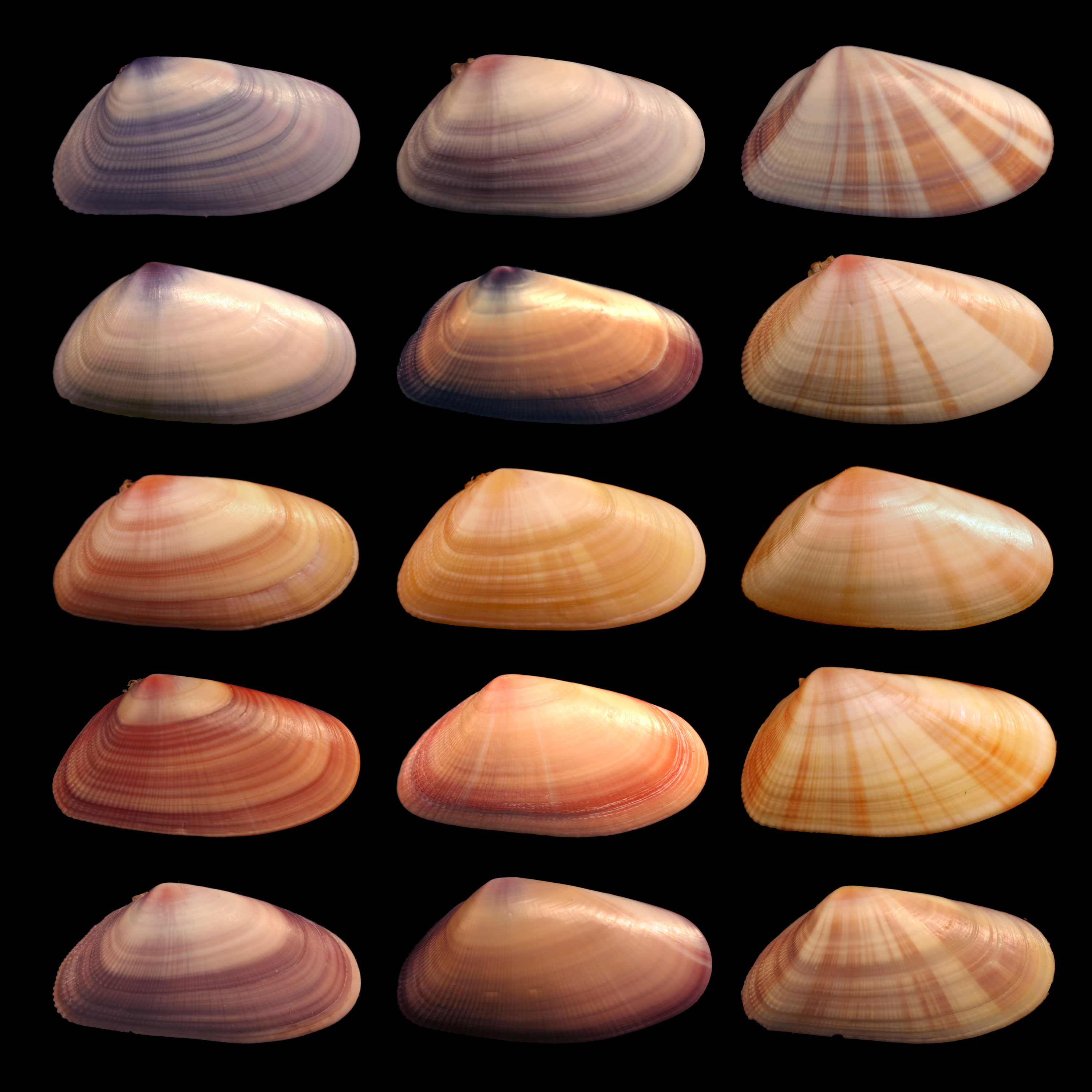
- A group of shells of Donax variabilis showing color variation

Scientific classification
- Kingdom: Animalia
- Phylum: Mollusca
- Class: Bivalvia
- Order: Cardiida
- Family: Donacidae
- Genus: Donax; Linnaeus, 1758

Species
- See text

Synonyms
- Capsella Gray, 1851; Grammatodonax Dall, 1900

= Donax (bivalve) =

Genus of molluscs

Donax is a genus of small, edible saltwater clams, marine bivalve molluscs with highly variable color patterns. The genus is sometimes called bean clams or wedge shells; however, Donax species bear different common names in different parts of the world. In the southeastern United States, they are called "coquina", a word that is also used for the hard limestone concretions of their shells and those of other marine invertebrates.

== Ecology ==
Species of Donax live in the swash zone, sometimes in high concentrations, vertically aligned in the sand on exposed beaches, on tropical and temperate coasts worldwide. When the waves wash these small clams out of the sand, they can dig back in again quite rapidly. They are phytoplankton filter feeders. They are an important source of food for crabs, fish and shorebirds. They are sensitive to environmental conditions and are considered an indicator of beach habitat health. Some species, such as Donax variabilis, migrate vertically and horizontally with changes in the tides. The genus enjoys a global distribution. These coquina clams are found extensively on the east coast beaches of Trinidad (Mayaro) and widely available in Venezuela.

== Human use ==
Donax is an edible mollusk that has been consumed since pre-historic times and is still consumed today. Numerous recipes for coquina soup have been published. Recreational foragers should follow seafood safety guidelines and shellfish harvesting restrictions, and should be aware of any harmful algal blooms that may contaminate shellfish with biotoxins. In some parts of the world Donax clams are still gathered by indigenous people as an important subsistence food.

== Species ==
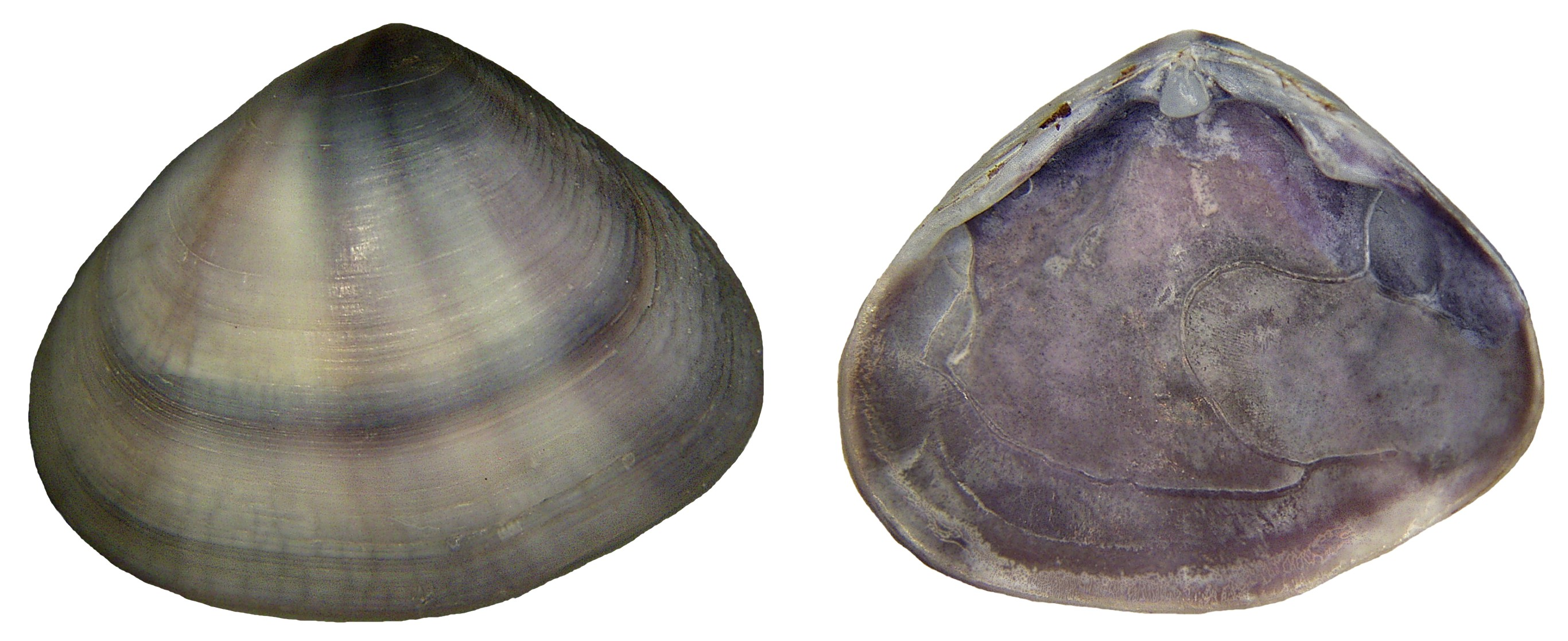
Donax cuneatus shell

Species within the genus Donax include:

- Donax asper Hanley 1845
- Donax assimilis Hanley, 1845
- Donax baliregteri Huber, 2012
- Donax bertini Pilsbry, 1901
- Donax bipartitus Sowerby III, 1892
- Donax brazieri Smith, 1892
- Donax bruneirufi Huber, 2012
- Donax burnupi Sowerby III, 1894
- Donax caelatus Carpenter, 1857
- Donax californicus Conrad, 1837
- Donax carinatus Hanley, 1843
- Donax clathratus Reeve, 1855
- Donax culter Hanley, 1845
- Donax cuneatus Linnaeus, 1758
- Donax denticulatus Linnaeus, 1758
- Donax dentifer Hanley, 1843
- Donax ecuadorianus Olsson, 1961
- Donax erythraeensis Bertin, 1881
- Donax faba Gmelin, 1791
- Donax fossor Say, 1822 - was thought at one time to be a northern form of D. variabilis
- Donax francisensis (Cotton & Godfrey, 1938)
- Donax gemmula Morrison, 1971
- Donax gouldii Dall, 1921 - The bean clam, aka Donax gracilis Hanley 1845
- Donax hanleyanus (Philippi, 1847)
- Donax kindermanni (Philippi, 1847)
- Donax lubricus Hanley, 1845
- Donax madagascariensis Wood, 1828
- Donax nitidus Deshayes, 1855
- Donax obesulus Reeve 1854
- Donax obesus d'Orbigny, 1845
- Donax oweni Hanley, 1843
- Donax paxillus Reeve, 1854
- Donax punctatostriatus Hanley, 1843
- Donax rothi Coan, 1983
- Donax semistriatus Poli, 1795
- Donax serra Röding, 1798
- Donax simplex Sowerby III, 1897
- Donax sordidus Hanley, 1845
- Donax striatus Linnaeus, 1767
- Donax texasianus Philippi, 1847
- Donax townsendi Sowerby III, 1894
- Donax transversus Sowerby I, 1825
- Donax trunculus Linnaeus, 1758
- Donax variabilis Say, 1822 - Known in Florida under the Spanish word "coquina", is the common and colorful Donax species of the southern Atlantic and Gulf shores from Virginia to the Caribbean. This species is locally abundant on beaches with fine sand from the mid-Atlantic coast to Texas.
- Donax variegatus (Gmelin, 1791)
- Donax vellicatus Reeve, 1855
- Donax veneriformis Lamarck, 1818
- Donax veruinus Hanley, 1913
- Donax vittatus (da Costa, 1778)

The empty small (15 to 25 mm) shells of Donax variabilis and Donax fossor may be found washed up on the beach, especially at low tide. The living animals can often be seen where the waves wash the sand around in the shallowest part of the littoral zone as the tidal level changes. These clams can use the action of waves to move themselves up and down the beach, quickly burrowing into a new location before they can be swept away (the so-called "dance of the coquina").
