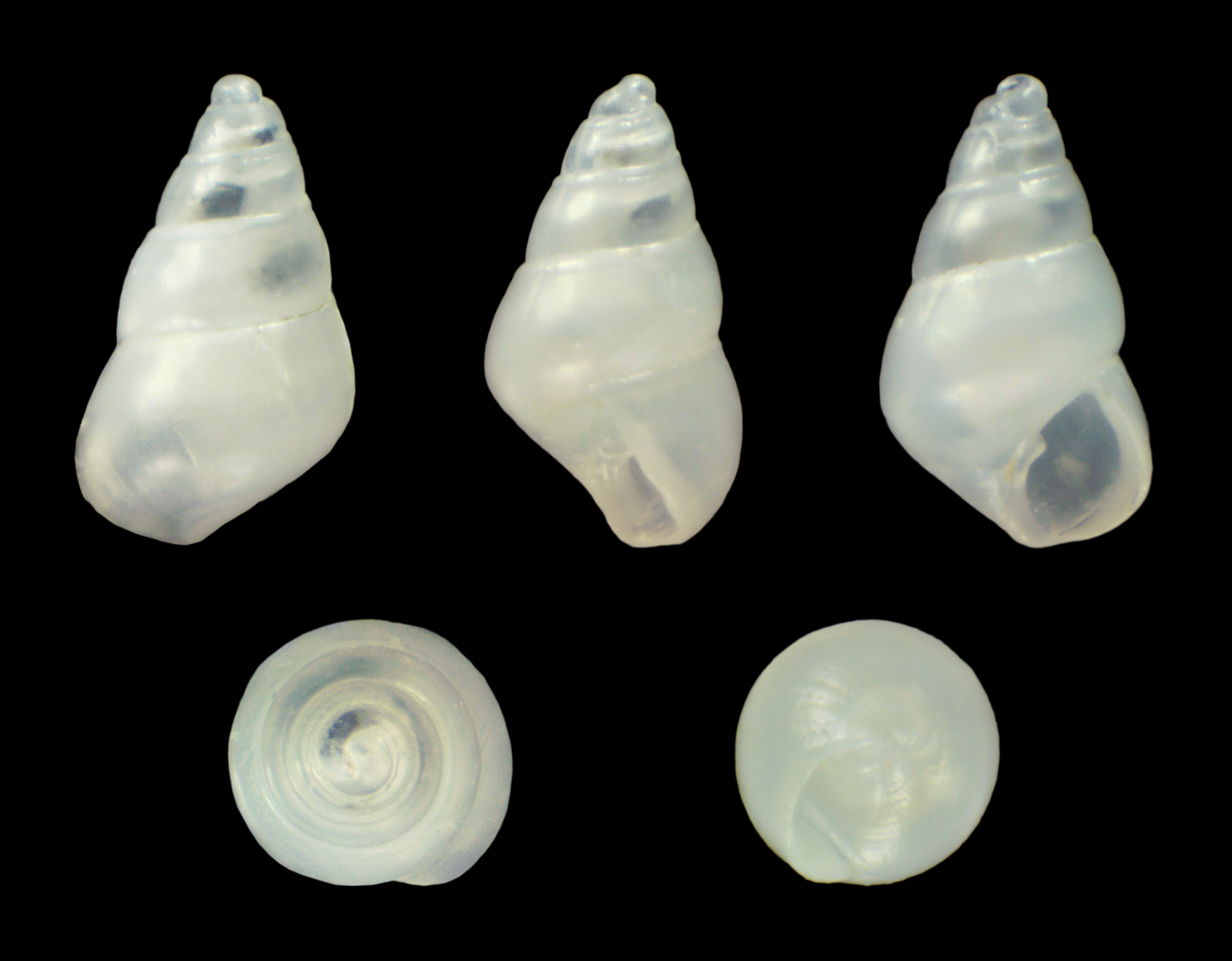

Scientific classification
- Kingdom: Animalia
- Phylum: Mollusca
- Class: Gastropoda
- Family: Pyramidellidae
- Genus: Odostomia
- Species: O. turrita

Binomial name
- Odostomia turrita Hanley, 1844

Synonyms
- Odostomia nana Jeffreys, 1884

= Odostomia turrita =

Species of gastropod

Odostomia turrita is a species of sea snail, a marine gastropod mollusc in the family Pyramidellidae, the pyrams and their allies.

== Description ==
The shell grows to a length of 2 mm – 3.5 mm. The shell is solid, semitransparent, and glossy. Its color is yellowish white or whitish, with a dark border below the suture The teleoconch contains 5–6 whorls. It is microscopically spirally striate. The periphery is obtusely keeled. The suture is narrow but distinct. There is no umbilicus. The columellar tooth is small, not prominent.

== Distribution ==
This species occurs in the following locations:

- Belgian Exclusive Economic Zone
- British Isles
- English Channel
- European waters (ERMS scope)
- Goote Bank
- Irish Exclusive economic Zone
- Spanish Exclusive Economic Zone
- United Kingdom Exclusive Economic Zone
- Wimereux
- in the Mediterranean Sea off Greece
- in the Atlantic Ocean off the Azores, Madeira, Tenerife and West Africa.
