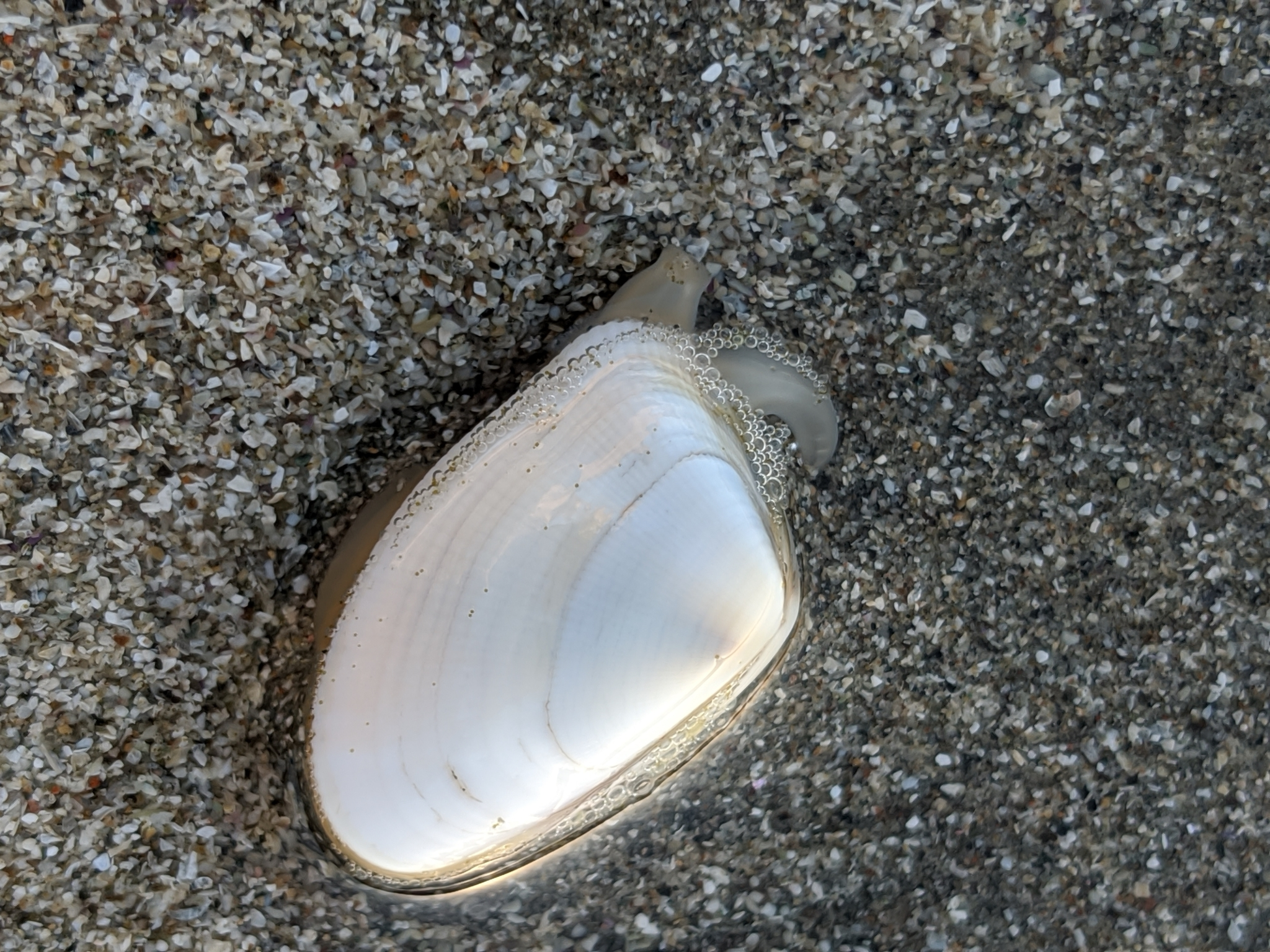

Scientific classification
- Domain: Eukaryota
- Kingdom: Animalia
- Phylum: Mollusca
- Class: Bivalvia
- Order: Cardiida
- Family: Donacidae
- Genus: Donax
- Species: D. gouldii

Binomial name
- Donax gouldii Dall, 1921

Synonyms
- Donax laevigata Reeve, 1854; Donax obesa R. A. Philippi, 1851; Donax obesus A. Gould, 1851

= Donax gouldii =

Species of bivalve

Donax gouldii, common name the Gould beanclam, is a species of small saltwater clam, a marine bivalve mollusk in the family Donacidae.

This species is found on the Pacific coast of North America. This Donax species, known for its periodic population explosions, was eaten by Native Americans in Southern California, particularly the Luiseno and Kumeyaay Indians of San Diego County.

== Description ==
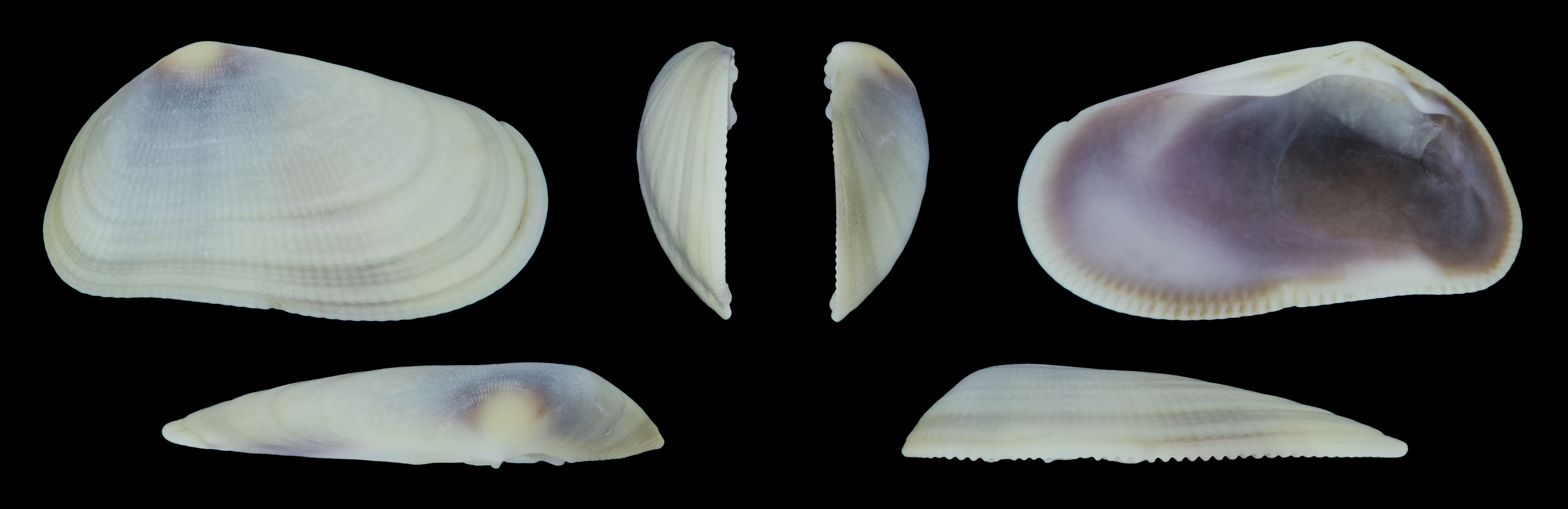
Right valve

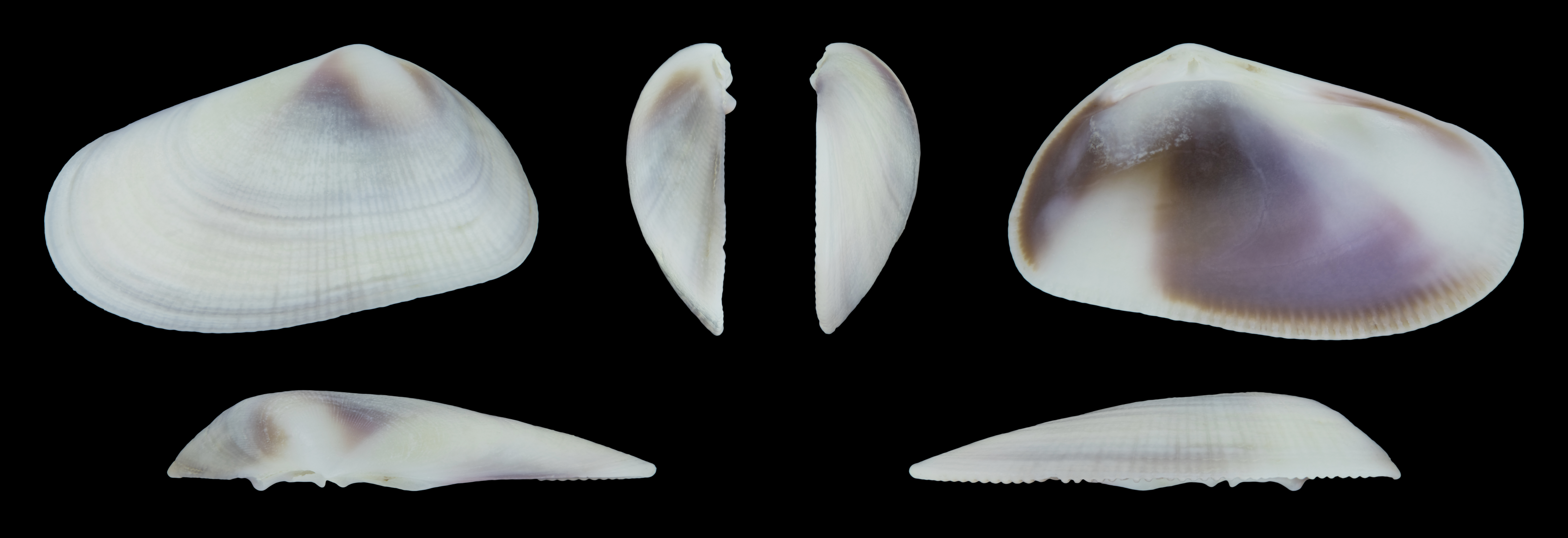
Left valve

The bean clam may reach one inch in length, and is of varying coloration, often cream, buff, orange or blue and frequently featuring darker rays projecting from the hinge area. The shells are relatively thick, and wedge-shaped, with a polished periostracum. The muscular foot is used by the clam to dig rapidly back into the sand when the clam is exposed by the waves. The bean clam hydroid, Eucheilota bakeri, is often found attached to the posterior end of the shell.

Bean clams live for 1–3 years. Local populations are characterized by cycles of explosion and die-off such that a population with a density of 20,000 clams per square meter may fall to fewer than a dozen over a single year. The die-offs are thought to be the result of mass infection of the population by a parasitic microorganism similar to Perkinsus marinus, which is known for disrupting oyster farming in the Gulf of Mexico and elsewhere on the southeastern coast of the United States.

== Habitat and range ==
The bean clam is found from Pismo Beach, California, to Arroyo del Conejo, Baja California Sur. It inhabits exposed sandy shores from the mid-intertidal zone to waters up to 30 meters deep. It can often be found in profusion at sites such as Redondo Beach, California, and Newport Beach, California.
