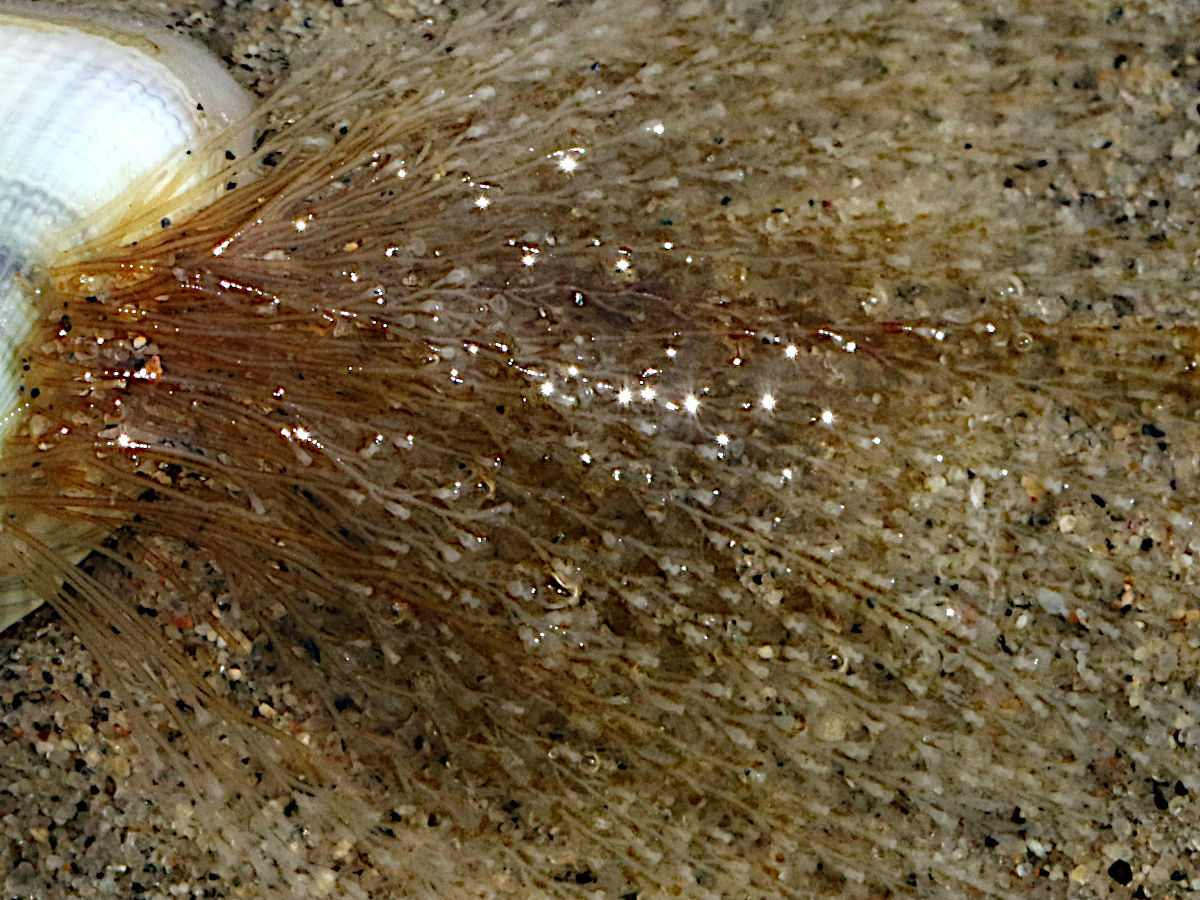

Scientific classification
- Kingdom: Animalia
- Phylum: Cnidaria
- Class: Hydrozoa
- Order: Leptothecata
- Family: Lovenellidae
- Genus: Eucheilota
- Species: E. bakeri

Binomial name
- Eucheilota bakeri (Torrey, 1904)

= Eucheilota bakeri =

Species of cnidarian

Eucheilota bakeri, the bean clam hydroid, is a species of hydroid in the family Lovenellidae, occurring in the Eastern Pacific: USA and Canada.

The life cycle includes both asexual and sexual stages; the species is capable of reproduction in both stages. Asexual reproduction occurs by a process called budding; this form of the animal is called a hydroid. Sexual reproduction occurs with the release of gametes by the adult form called a medusa. Hydroids are often found attached to the shell of a Gould beanclam.
