= Odostomia striolata =

Scientific classification
- Kingdom: Animalia
- Phylum: Mollusca
- Class: Gastropoda
- Family: Pyramidellidae
- Genus: Odostomia
- Species: O. striolata

Binomial name
- Odostomia striolata Forbes & Hanley, 1850

Synonyms
- Odostomia monterosatoi Bucquoy, Dautzenberg & Dollfus, 1883

Species of gastropod

Odostomia striolata is a species of sea snail, a marine gastropod mollusk in the family Pyramidellidae, the pyrams and their allies.

== Distribution ==
This species occurs in the following locations:

- Atlantic Europe
- Azores Exclusive Economic Zone
- European waters (ERMS scope)
- Greek Exclusive Economic Zone
- Macaronesian Islands
- Mediterranean Sea
- Portuguese Exclusive Economic Zone
- Spanish Exclusive Economic Zone
- United Kingdom Exclusive Economic Zone

== Notes ==
Additional information regarding this species:

- Habitat: Known from seamounts and knolls
