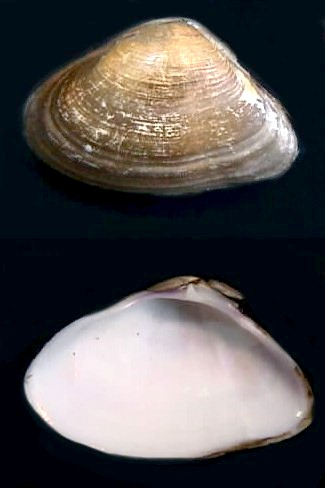
- Iphigenia brasiliensis

Scientific classification
- Domain: Eukaryota
- Kingdom: Animalia
- Phylum: Mollusca
- Class: Bivalvia
- Order: Cardiida
- Family: Donacidae
- Genus: Iphigenia; Schumacher, 1817

= Iphigenia (bivalve) =

Genus of bivalves

Iphigenia is a genus of bivalves belonging to the family Donacidae.

The species of this genus are found in Africa and America.

Species:

- Iphigenia altior (G.B.Sowerby I, 1833)
- Iphigenia brasiliensis (Lamarck, 1818)
- Iphigenia centralis (Germain, 1904)
- Iphigenia curta (Dunker, 1867)
- Iphigenia delessertii (Bernardi, 1860)
- Iphigenia laevigata (Gmelin, 1791)
- Iphigenia messageri (Preston, 1909)
- Iphigenia psammobialis Deshayes, 1855
