= Mitrocomium =

Scientific classification
- Domain: Eukaryota
- Kingdom: Animalia
- Phylum: Cnidaria
- Class: Hydrozoa
- Order: Leptothecata
- Family: Lovenellidae
- Genus: Mitrocomium; Haeckel, 1879

Synonyms
- Campalecium Torrey, 1902

Genus of hydrozoans

Mitrocomium is a genus of cnidarians belonging to the family Lovenellidae.

The species of this genus are found in Southern Hemisphere.

== Species ==
Species:

- Mitrocomium alcoicum (Watson, 1993)
- Mitrocomium cirratum Haeckel, 1879
- Mitrocomium medusiferum (Torrey, 1902)
- Mitrocomium simplex (Pictet, 1893)
