= Hydranthea =

Scientific classification
- Kingdom: Animalia
- Phylum: Cnidaria
- Class: Hydrozoa
- Order: Leptothecata
- Family: Lovenellidae
- Genus: Hydranthea; Hincks, 1868

Genus of hydrozoans

Hydranthea is a genus of cnidarians belonging to the family Lovenellidae. Like other Hydrozoans they are colonial. They have hydrorhiza connected to tubular stolons attaching them to other objects, like algae, kelp, rocks and crabs.

== Description ==
Hydranthea have small smooth hydrophores placed irregularly along their hydrorhiza, of variable length - though they tend to be shorter. They have elongated polyps along their stems. Their bodies are pale gold in color, with a thin white band below the hypostome, an appendage on their mouth. Their tentacles, of which they have 30 per whorl, are long and colorless and connected to each other at their bases by an intertentacular web. They have around two to three Nematocysts between each set of tentacles on this web.

Hydranthea have oval gonophores, a reproductive structure, on their hydrorhiza. They are dieoecious, with usually only one sex, male or female, present within a single colony.

== Behavior ==
Hydranthea are active and capable of stretching their tentacles, tending to bend to touch the substrate they are rooted in when disturbed.

== Species and Classification ==
Species:

- Hydranthea aloysii (Zoja, 1893)
- Hydranthea diaphana (Hadzi, 1914)
- Hydranthea margarica (Hincks, 1862)

A fourth species is in dispute, previously classified by some databases as Hydranthea phialiformis. Latest databases accept the species as Hydractinia phialiformis (Antsulevich, 1983), a separate genus from Hydranthea.

There was also a lack of consensus on the specific family Hydranthea belongs to. Several accounts noted it as belonging to the Haleciidae, however recent research has moved Hydranthea to Lovenellidae.

== Distribution ==
The species of this genus are found in oceans surrounding Europe, Japan and Australia. There have been sightings of Hydranthea margarica found in Scottish waters near Sanda Island, Argyll. This species has also been found in the Indian Ocean, south of Australia and the Seychelles, though the latter is hypothesized to potentially be a different species due to the lack of nematocysts on the samples found there. Species found in the Mediterranean Sea, notably Hydranthea aloysii, have been cited with high confidence (≤95%) to be extinct, or at least extremely rare, due to their lack of sightings in recent scientific literature about the region.
