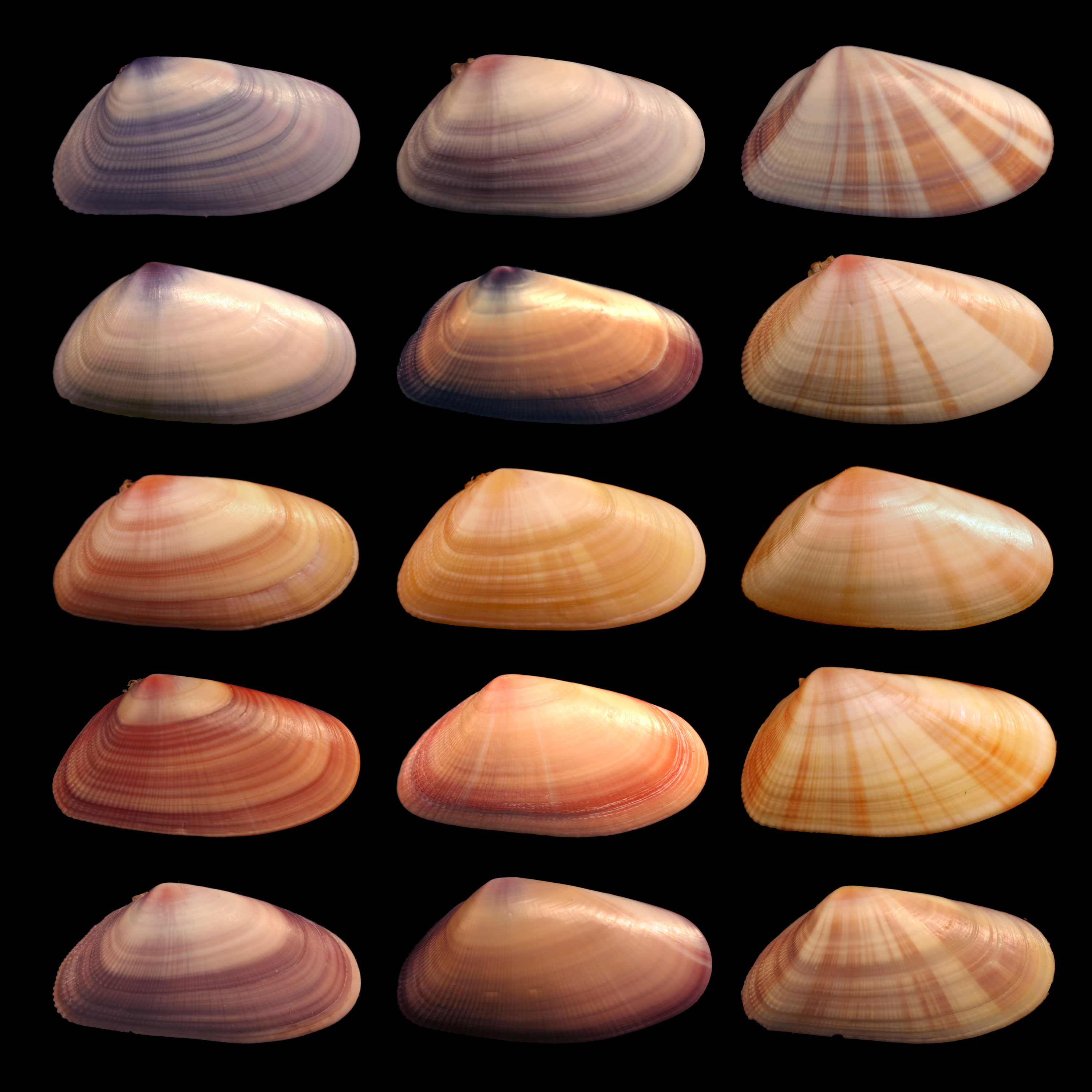
- Donax variabilis shells showing some color variation

Scientific classification
- Kingdom: Animalia
- Phylum: Mollusca
- Class: Bivalvia
- Order: Cardiida
- Family: Donacidae
- Genus: Donax
- Species: D. variabilis

Binomial name
- Donax variabilis Say, 1822

= Donax variabilis =

Species of mollusc

Donax variabilis, known by the common name coquina, is a species of small edible saltwater clam, a marine bivalve mollusc in the family Donacidae, the bean clams. It is a warm water species which occurs in shallow water on sandy beaches on the east coast of the United States and is also plentiful in Mayaro, Trinidad as well as the Caribbean coast of Venezuela. Known as chip-chip in Trinidad and chipi-chipi in Venezuela.

== Distribution ==
This species occurs on the east coast of the United States, from Cape May, New Jersey to Florida including East Florida, West Florida and the Florida Keys.

== Description ==
The maximum reported size is 19 mm (0.75 in). The exterior of the small shell of this species can have any one of a wide range of possible colors, from almost white, through yellow, pink, orange, red, purple, to brownish and blueish, with or without the presence of darker rays.

== Biology ==
This species lives from the intertidal zone of sandy beaches to a depth of 11 m (36 ft). As most mollusks, the coquina is host to a variety of parasites. On the Atlantic Coast of the United States, studies have shown that coquinas harbour the larval stages (cercariae, sporocysts) of at least three species of digeneans (none of these represents a danger for humans).

== Human uses ==
The coquina is edible and is used to make broth. Some people collect the colorful shells to use for crafts. They are sometimes consumed fried, as a type of fritter, in Trinidad. It is also used in a type of cocktail, with a local culantro flavoured sauce. It's also very popular in a coconut curry with cassava dumplings.

== See also ==
- Donax fossor, a similar species with a more northern distribution
