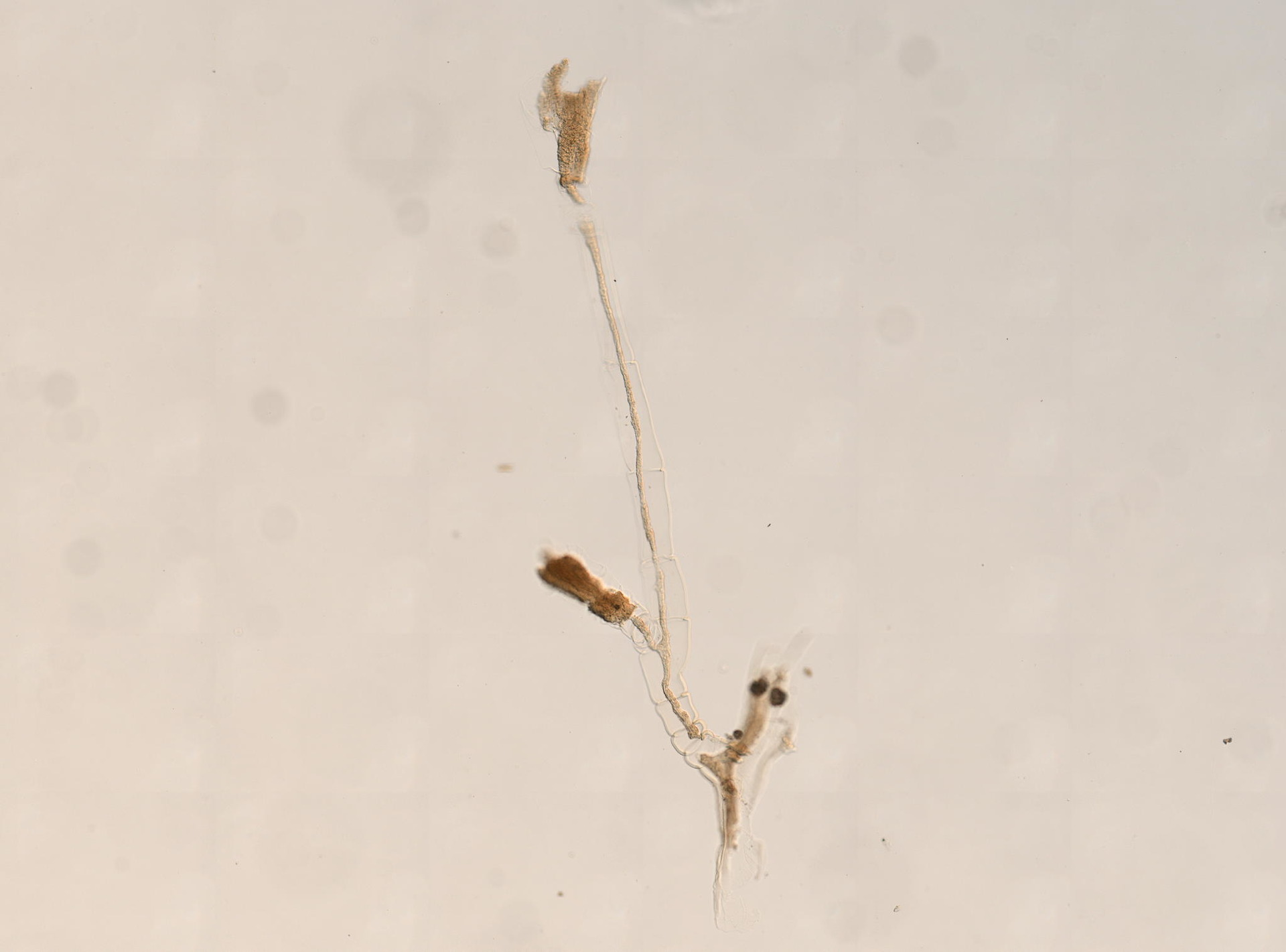

Scientific classification
- Kingdom: Animalia
- Phylum: Cnidaria
- Class: Hydrozoa
- Order: Leptothecata
- Family: Lovenellidae
- Genus: Lovenella
- Species: L. gracilis

Binomial name
- Lovenella gracilis Clarke, 1882

= Lovenella gracilis =

Species of Cnidarian

The epibiotic hydroid (Lovenella gracilis) is a benthic species within the Cnidaria phylum which is distributed throughout the Western Atlantic Ocean.

== Description ==
Lovenella gracilis are colonial animals that form erect colonies, on hard surfaces using a hydrorhiza, stem-like structure, and reach a maximum height of around 2.3 mm. The polyp is the dominant stage of the L. gracilis. They are trophosome with thin hydrocaulus that branch out alternatively to form the hydrotheca. At the end of each branch there is a conical operculum that consists of eight pieces. This structure also contains ten to twelve tentacles equipped with nematocysts that can be used in self-defense or to capture their prey.

In the preliminary stages of differentiating between the Lovenella gracilis and Lovenella clausa, many hydrozoas were categorized as Lovenella clausa--from Northwest Europe—instead of the actual Lovenella gracilis. These two hydroids were later determined to be different. The first difference is that instead of L. gracilis having annulated hydrocaulus, it has one node that diverges into different cylindrical internodes. Furthermore, the hydrothecae of L. gracilis is shallow and bell shaped, rather than cylindrical like L. clausa. Lastly, cross section analysis indicates oval shape as opposed to circular.

== Distribution ==
Lovenella gracilis was first identified on the Chesapeake Bay in 1882. Since then it has been identified throughout the east coast of the United States as far north as Massachusetts and as far inland as Mississippi, with some being spotted in South America.

Beyond geographical distribution, L. gracilis has been observed to only live in specific water conditions optimized for their survival. For example, they are the most active in the water column throughout the spring and summer when water temperatures are warmer. In Virginia specifically, they are most prevalent form April to October. These patterns however, are generalized throughout the Western Atlantic Ocean when temperatures reach 15 °C, but population size start to decline as the water temperature surpasses 20 °C. This pattern has a morphological explanation where tissues of hydroids tend to degenerate back into the hydrorhiza in cold temperatures but are able to regrow as the water temperatures once again increases.

== Ecological role ==
In the rocky intertidal of North Carolina, L. gracilis has shown to have a symbiotic relationship with an infernal clam(Donax variables). The clam provides a subratre for the L. gracilis to attach to while the hydroid protects the clam from predators using its nematocysts. The nematocysts, however, were only effective in deterring the Florida pompano while providing no protection from the speckled crabs and ghost crabs.
