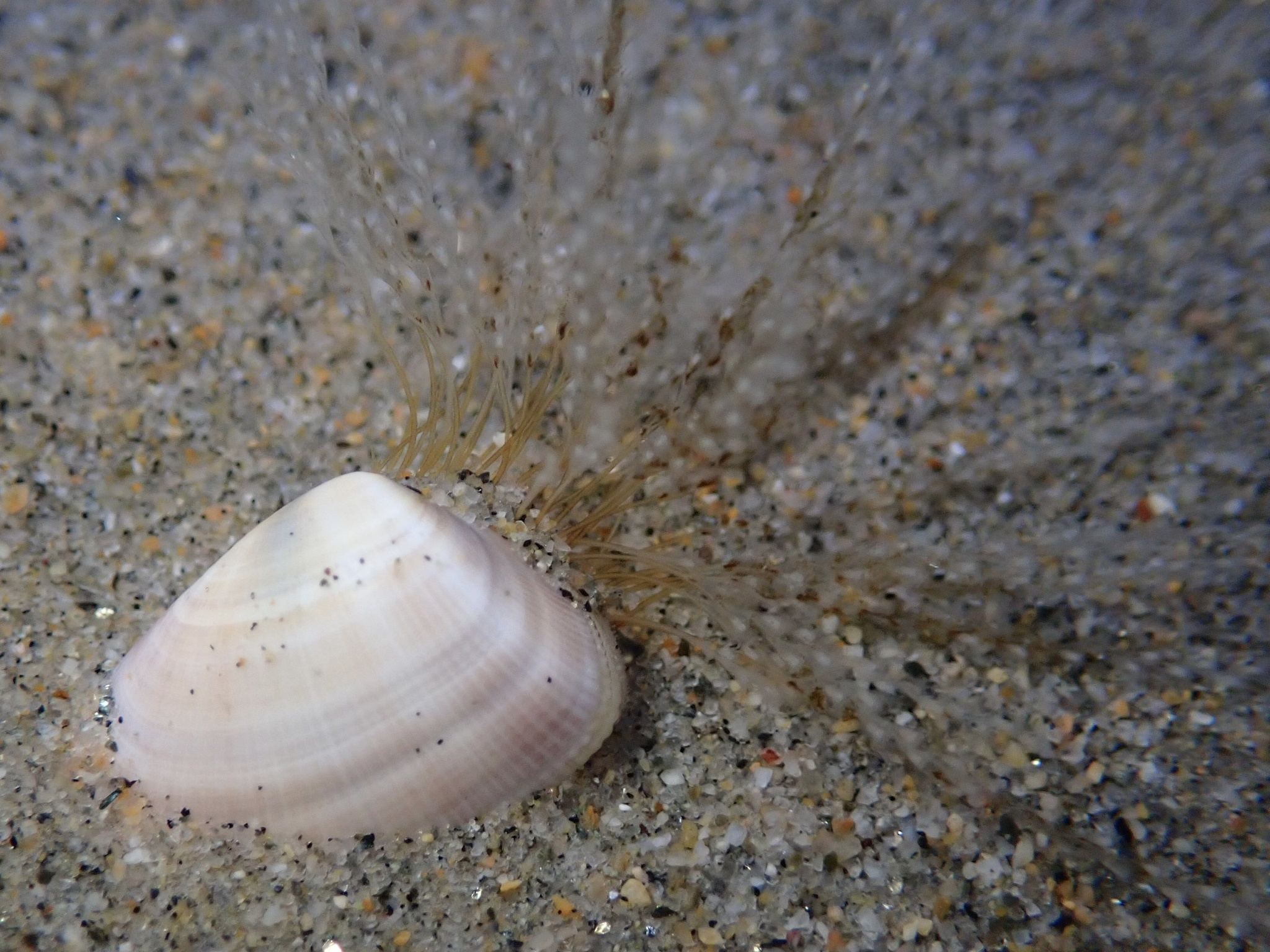
- Eucheilota bakeri

Scientific classification
- Domain: Eukaryota
- Kingdom: Animalia
- Phylum: Cnidaria
- Class: Hydrozoa
- Order: Leptothecata
- Family: Lovenellidae
- Genus: Eucheilota; McCrady, 1859

Synonyms
- Campomma Stechow, 1921; Phialium Haeckel, 1879

= Eucheilota =

Genus of hydrozoans

Eucheilota is a genus of cnidarians belonging to the family Lovenellidae.

The genus has an almost cosmopolitan distribution.

== Species ==
The following species are recognised in the genus Eucheilota:

- Eucheilota bakeri (Torrey, 1904)
- Eucheilota birabeni Tundisi, 1962
- Eucheilota bitentaculata Huang, Li & Zhong, 2010
- Eucheilota carinata Xu, Huang & Guo, 2018
- Eucheilota comata (Bigelow, 1909)
- Eucheilota convoluta Xu, Huang & Guo, 2019
- Eucheilota duodecimalis A. Agassiz, 1862
- Eucheilota flevensis Van Kampen, 1922
- Eucheilota foresti Goy, 1979
- Eucheilota hongkongensis Xu, Huang & Guo, 2014
- Eucheilota maasi Neppi & Stiasny, 1911
- Eucheilota macrogona Zhang & Lin, 1984
- Eucheilota maculata Hartlaub, 1894
- Eucheilota menoni Kramp, 1959
- Eucheilota minima Bouillon, 1984
- Eucheilota multicirris Xu & Huang, 1990
- Eucheilota paradoxica Mayer, 1900
- Eucheilota taiwanensis Xu & Huang, 1990
- Eucheilota tropica Kramp, 1959
- Eucheilota ventricularis McCrady, 1859
- Eucheilota xiamensis Xu, Huang & Guo, 2014
