= Lovenella =

Scientific classification
- Domain: Eukaryota
- Kingdom: Animalia
- Phylum: Cnidaria
- Class: Hydrozoa
- Order: Leptothecata
- Family: Lovenellidae
- Genus: Lovenella; Hincks, 1868

Genus of aquatic animals

Lovenella is a genus of cnidarians belonging to the family Lovenellidae.

The genus has cosmopolitan distribution.

Species:

- Lovenella annae (Lendenfeld, 1885)
- Lovenella assimilis (Browne, 1905)
- Lovenella bermudensis (Fewkes, 1883)
- Lovenella chiquita Millard, 1957
- Lovenella clausa (Lovén, 1836)
- Lovenella corrugata Thornely, 1908
- Lovenella gracilis Clarke, 1882
- Lovenella grandis Nutting, 1901
- Lovenella haichangensis Xu & Huang, 1983
- Lovenella macrogona Lin, Xu & Huang, 2010
- Lovenella nodosa Fraser, 1938
- Lovenella polyconcretus Xu, Huang & Guo, 2013
- Lovenella rugosa Fraser, 1938
- Lovenella sinuosa Lin, Xu, Huang & Wang, 2009
