= Lovenellidae =

Scientific classification
- Kingdom: Animalia
- Phylum: Cnidaria
- Class: Hydrozoa
- Subclass: Hydroidolina
- Order: Leptothecata
- Family: Lovenellidae; Russell, 1953

Synonyms
- Eucheilotidae Bouillon, 1984

Family of hydrozoans

Lovenellidae is a family of hydrozoans. Their hydroids live together in upright stolonal or sympodial colonies, and their gonophores are pedunculate free-roaming medusae. The relationships of this fairly small but distinctive radiation to other members of the order Leptothecata are not well understood at present.

== Description ==
The elongated, everted-conical to bell-shaped hydrothecae are pedicellate. They have a diaphragm and a conical operculum apically to the hydrothecal wall, formed either by this wall or by separated embayments of the hydrothecal margin, with a lining of triangular plates. The tentacles of some but not all carry webbing between them. The hydrothecae wear down during the individual hydroids' life, and old ones often have just the collar-like bottom of the hydrotheca remaining.

The manubrium of the medusae is short. They lack a gastric peduncle, ocelli (making them effectively blind) and excretory pores, and have 4 simple radial canals and in adults at least 16 statocysts. The tentacles at their margin are hollow and at the side carry cirri; cirri are lacking from around the margin however. The gonads are located at the radial canals; they do not reach the manubrium.

== Genera ==
Five genera of Lovenellidae are generally recognized as valid if Cirrholovenia and Eucheilota are merged therein, as is widely done these days. Hydranthea is placed here in some treatments, but otherwise in the family Haleciidae; corroborating the relationship between these two hard-to-place families:

- Eucheilota McCrady, 1859
- Hydranthea Hincks, 1868
- Lovenella Hincks, 1868
- Mitrocomium Haeckel, 1879 (= Haleciella)
- Paralovenia
