= Sylvanus Charles Thorp Hanley =

British conchologist and malacologist

- Born: 1819
- Died: 1899 (age about 80)
- Known for: The Hanley Collections in Leeds City Museum
- Scientific career
- Fields: Conchologist, malacologist
- Author abbrev. (zoology): Hanley

Sylvanus Charles Thorp Hanley (1819–1899) was a British conchologist and malacologist who published the first book on shells using the then new technique of photography. He authored Conchologia indica with William Theobald which was a treatise on the shells of British India. The plates were drawn and lithographed by George Brettingham Sowerby the younger, who was well known for writing and illustrating excellent works of natural history, especially conchological works. Sowerby became the best illustrator of conchological works of his time, illustrating such classics as Reeve's monumental twenty-volume Conchologia Iconica.

Sylvanus Hanley inherited a fortune, which enabled him to devote a lifetime to conchology. He was especially interested in the bivalves, on which he was a leading authority. He published over 40 books and scientific papers, and described over 200 new species. Hanley collected molluscs extensively; most of his collections are today held at Leeds City Museum in Yorkshire, England. Hanley collected over a period of 60 years, and corresponded frequently with many other naturalists of his time. He acquired several specimens of Unio, now extinct, for Isaac Lea. Several syntypes were collected by him for other leading contemporary biologists, including Arthur Adams, W.H. Dall, Henry B. Guppy, Richard Brinsley Hinds, Jeffries, Leath, Sven Ludvig Lovén, George Montagu, William Harper Pease, Rodolfo Amando Philippi and Tryon Reakirt.

The Hanley Collections, as it is called, forms one of the largest collections in Leeds City Museum, occupying 13 cabinets and 206 drawers.

Hanley Road and the now-lost Sylvanus Row, both in Islington, were named in honour of his father. His son was the painter Edgar Wilkins Hanley (1855–1886).

== Bibliography ==
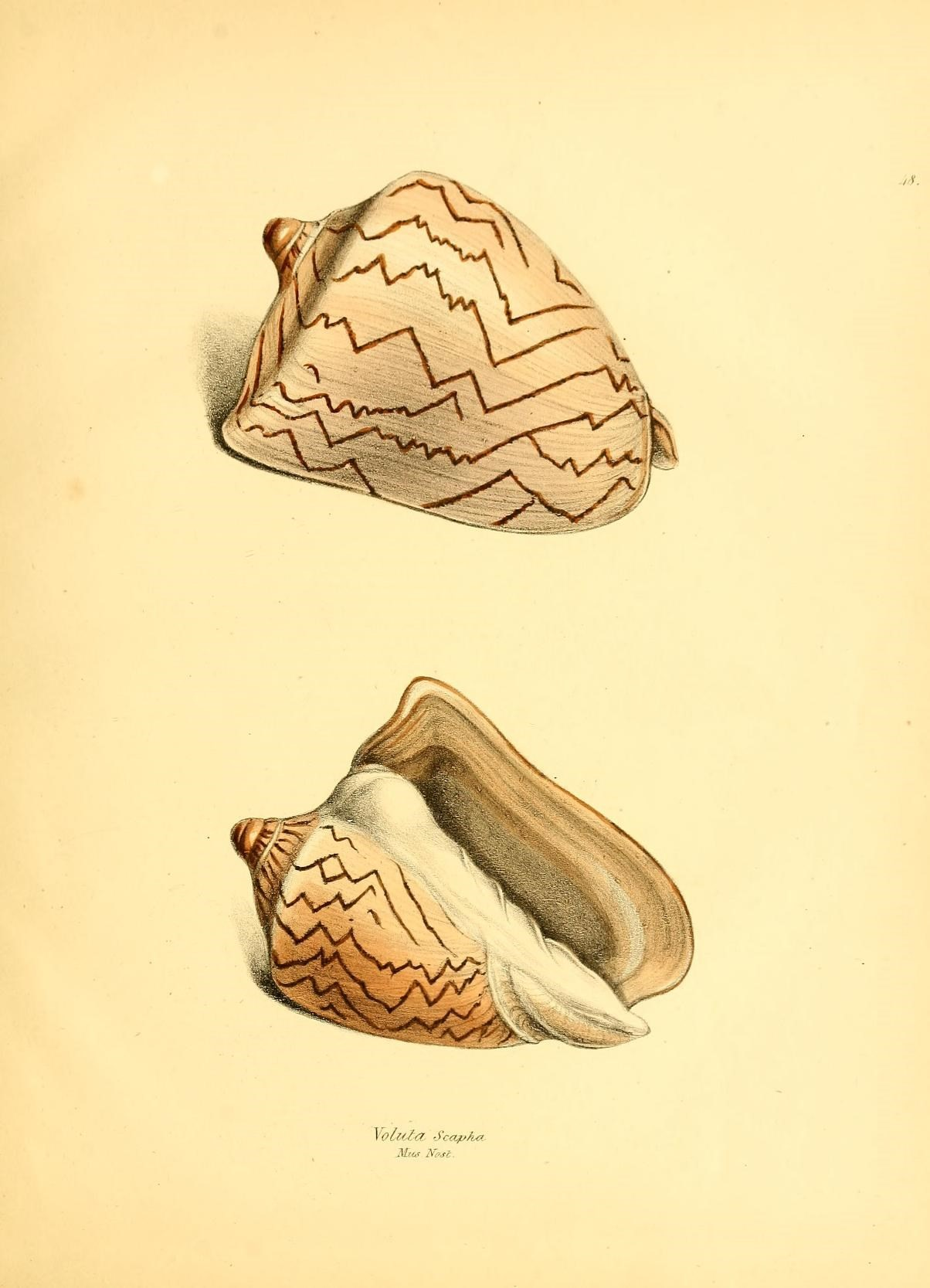
Exotic conchology 1841

- Index to Catalogue of recent bivalve shells
- 1840 The young conchologist's book of species. Univalves J. Fraser (London)
- 1842 The conchologist's book of species : containing descriptions of six hundred species of univalves. London.
- 1843 An illustrated, enlarged, and English edition of Lamarck's Species of shells comprising the whole of the recent additions in Deshayes' last French edition, with numerous species not noticed by that naturalist, accompanied by accurate delineations of almost all the shells described, and forming the third edition of the Index testaceologicus, with illustrations by W. Wood W. Wood (London)
- 1855 Ipsa Linnaei conchylia: The shells of Linnaeus, determined from his manuscripts and collections; also, an exact reprint of the Vermes testacea of the 'Systema naturae' and 'Mantissa'. Williams and Norgate (London)
- 1856 Index Testaceologicus: An Illustrated Catalogue of British and Foreign Shells. Along with William Wood. Published by Willis and Sotheran, 234 pages PDF
- 1876 Conchologia Indica: Illustrations of the Land and Freshwater Shells of British India Along with William Theobald. Malacological Society of London. Link on Google Books
