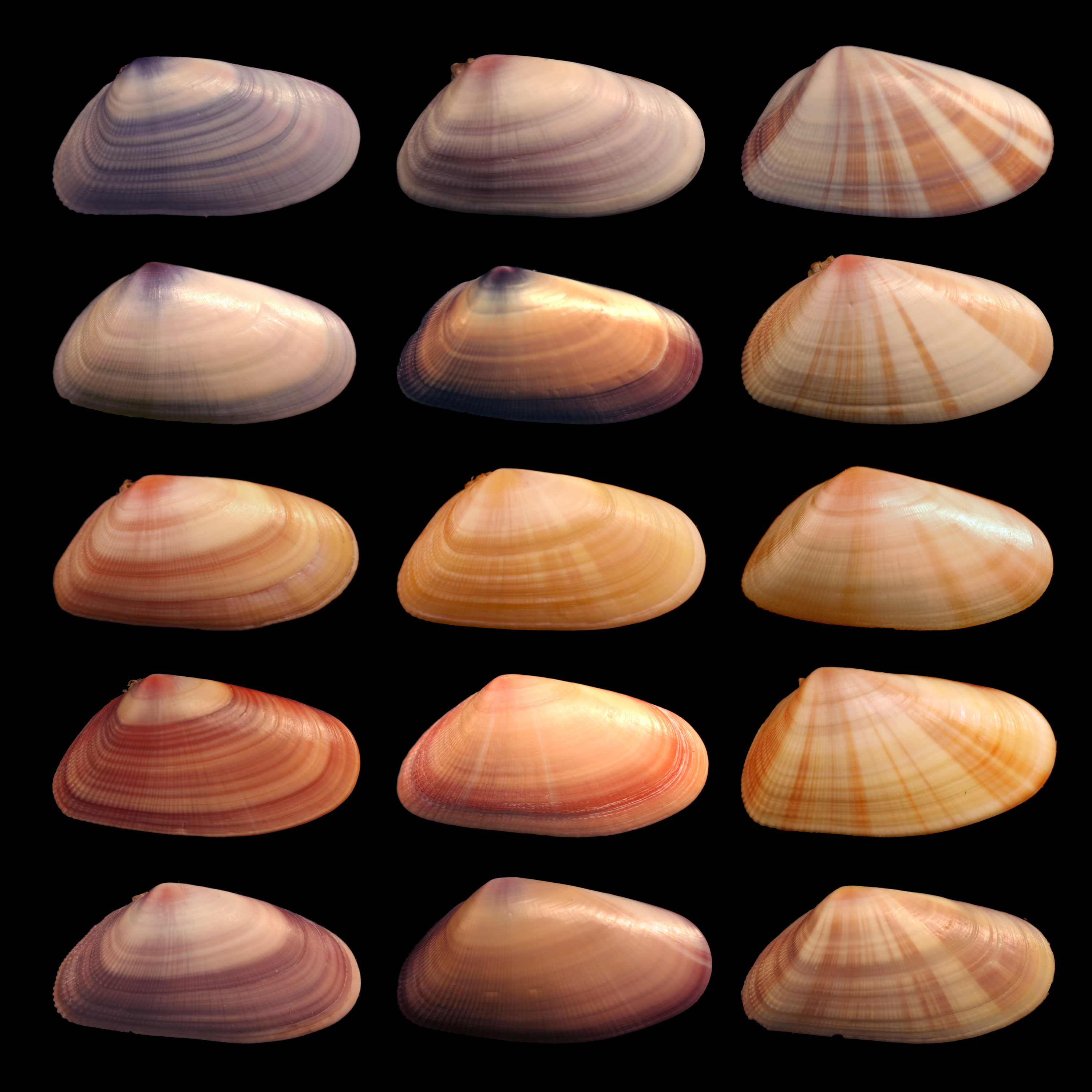
- Donax variabilis

Scientific classification
- Kingdom: Animalia
- Phylum: Mollusca
- Class: Bivalvia
- Order: Cardiida
- Superfamily: Tellinoidea
- Family: Donacidae; Fleming, 1828

Genera
- See text.

= Donacidae =

Family of bivalves

The Donacidae, the bean clams or wedge shells, are a family of bivalve molluscs of the superfamily Tellinoidea.

The Donacidae are prolific filter feeders and are an important part of coastal food chains where they occur. The family is sensitive to coastal industry such as dam-building and dredging.

== Description ==
Members of this family have asymmetric, elongated, compressed shells. The two siphons are short but are completely divided, and the foot is large. They are vigorous burrowers.

== Genera ==
- Donax Linnaeus, 1758
- †Egerella Stoliczka, 1870
- Galatea Bruguière, 1797
- Hecuba Schumacher, 1817
- Iphigenia Schumacher, 1817
- Latona Schumacher, 1817
