= Haloperoxidase =

Class of enzymes

Haloperoxidases are peroxidases that are able to mediate the oxidation of halides by hydrogen peroxide. Both halides and hydrogen peroxide are widely available in the environment.

== Mechanistic and thermodynamic considerations ==
Halogenations of organic compounds by free halogens (F_{2}, Cl_{2}, Br_{2}, and sometimes I_{2}) is generally favorable process. It is practiced industrially on a big scale for example. In nature, however, free halogens do not exist in appreciable amounts. The combination of hydrogen peroxide, which is widely produced by aerobic life, and halide anions Cl^{−}, Br^{−}, I^{−} provides the equivalent of Cl_{2}, Br_{2}, I_{2}. The oxidation of these anions by hydrogen peroxide is slow in the absence of enzymes. These enzymes are called haloperoxidases. The reaction that they catalyze is:

X^{−} + H_{2}O_{2} + H^{+} → HOX + H_{2}O
HOX + R−H → H_{2}O + R−X

From the perspective of thermodynamics, the Nernst equation confirms that hydrogen peroxide can oxidize chloride (E°= 1.36 V), bromide (E°= 1.09 V), and iodide (E°= 0.536 V) from a thermodynamic perspective under natural conditions, i.e., a temperature range of about 0–30 °C and a pH ranging from about 3 (humic soil layer) to about 8 (sea water). Fluoride (E°= 2.87 V) cannot be oxidized by hydrogen peroxide.

== Classification ==
The table shows the classification of haloperoxidases according to the halides whose oxidation they are able to catalyze.

The classification of these enzymes by substrate-usability does not necessarily indicate enzyme substrate preference. For example, although eosinophil peroxidase is able to oxidize chloride, it preferentially oxidizes bromide.

The mammalian haloperoxidases myeloperoxidase (MPO), lactoperoxidase (LPO) and eosinophil peroxidase (EPO) are also capable of oxidizing the pseudohalide thiocyanate (SCN^{−}). They each contain a heme prosthetic group covalently bound by two ester linkages to aspartate and/or glutamate side-chains. MPO has a third covalent link through a methionine residue. Horseradish peroxidase is also capable of oxidizing these substrates, but its heme is not covalently bound and becomes damaged during turnover.

A specific vanadium bromoperoxidase in marine organisms (fungi, bacteria, microalgae, perhaps other eukaryotes) uses vanadate and hydrogen peroxide to brominate electrophilic organics.

Murex snails have a bromoperoxidase used to produce Tyrian purple dye. The enzyme is very specific to bromide and physically stable, but has not been characterized as to its active site.

| Haloperoxidase | Oxidisable halide | Origin, Notes |
|---|---|---|
| Chloroperoxidase (CPO) | Cl^{−}, Br^{−}, I^{−} | neutrophils (myeloperoxidase), eosinophils (eosinophil peroxidase, can use Cl^{−}, prefers Br^{−}); Caldariomyces fumago |
| Bromoperoxidase (BPO) | Br^{−}, I^{−} | milk, saliva, tears (lactoperoxidase), sea urchin eggs (ovoperoxidase), vanadium bromoperoxidase,(marine algae, other marine spp.?), Murex snail bromoperoxidase (does not use I^{−} or Cl^{−}) |
| Iodoperoxidase (IPO) | I^{−} | horseradish (horseradish peroxidase) thyroid (thyroid peroxidase) |

== See also ==
- Vanadium bromoperoxidase
