= C2H3Br3 =

The molecular formula C_{2}H_{3}Br_{3} (molar mass: 266.76 g/mol, exact mass: 263.7785 u) may refer to:

- Tribromoethanes
  - 1,1,1-Tribromoethane
  - 1,1,2-Tribromoethane
