= ERG5 =

Sterol 22-desaturase

Identifiers
- Organism: Saccharomyces cerevisiae S288c
- Symbol: ERG5
- Alt. symbols: CYP61A1
- Entrez: 855029
- Orthologs: NCBI: entry; OMA: entry
- RefSeq (mRNA): NM_001182511.1
- RefSeq (Prot): NP_013728.1
- UniProt: P54781

Other data
- EC number: 1.14.19.41
- Chromosome: XIII: 0.3 - 0.3 Mb
Search for
- Structures: Swiss-model
- Domains: InterPro

ERG5 or Sterol 22-desaturase is a cytochrome P450 enzyme in the ergosterol biosynthesis pathway of fungi Saccharomyces cerevisiae (Baker's yeast, a model organism), with the CYP Symbol CYP61A1. CYP61A1 is one of only three P450 enzyme found in baker's yeast, the other two are CYP51F1 and CYP56A1. The ortholog in Schizosaccharomyces pombe (fission yeast, the second sequenced model fungi), was named CYP61A3 for historical reasons, and is only one of two P450 enzyme found with CYP51F1. ERG5 catalyzes the C22-C23 double bond formation on the sterol side chain of ergostatrienol to convert it into ergostatetraenol, then the C24 double bond of ergostatetraenol will be hydrogenation reduced into ergosterol by ERG4.

== Ortholog ==
Most fungi have only one CYP61 gene, and CYP61 global distributed in fungi. There are some of the ortholog found in early genome sequenced organism:

CYP symbol	Species	UniProt/EMBL
CYP61A1	Saccharomyces cerevisiae	P54781
CYP61A2	Candida albicans	A0A1B3B2L4
CYP61A3	Schizosaccharomyces pombe	O13820
CYP61A4	Botrytis cinerea	AL111744
CYP61A5	Neurospora crassa	
