= CYP710 family =

Group of cytochrome P450 enzymes

Cytochrome P450, family 710, also known as CYP710, is a plant cytochrome P450 monooxygenase family, the proteins encoded by its family members are mainly sterol 22-desaturase, which was widely distributed in plants, and take participate in Phytosteroidogenesis. CYP710 family is considered to be the plant orthologous of fungi CYP61 family, which is lost in animal. The CYP61/CYP710 ancestor gene diverged from a gene duplication of ancestor CYP51 in early eukaryotes
