= Eburicol =

Names
- IUPAC name 24-Methylidenelanost-8-en-3β-ol
- Systematic IUPAC name (1R,3aR,5aR,7S,9aS,11aR)-3a,6,6,9a,11a-Pentamethyl-1-[(2R)-6-methyl-5-methylideneheptan-2-yl]-2,3,3a,4,5,5a,6,7,8,9,9a,10,11,11a-tetradecahydro-1H-cyclopenta[a]phenanthren-7-ol

Identifiers
CAS Number	6890-88-6
3D model (JSmol)	Interactive image
ChEBI	CHEBI:70315
ChemSpider	7979070
PubChem CID	9803310
CompTox Dashboard (EPA)	DTXSID401319161
- InChI: InChI=1S/C31H52O/c1-20(2)21(3)10-11-22(4)23-14-18-31(9)25-12-13-26-28(5,6)27(32)16-17-29(26,7)24(25)15-19-30(23,31)8/h20,22-23,26-27,32H,3,10-19H2,1-2,4-9H3/t22-,23-,26+,27+,29-,30-,31+/m1/s1 Key: XJLZCPIILZRCPS-ANMPWZFDSA-N
- SMILES: C[C@H](CCC(=C)C(C)C)[C@H]1CC[C@@]2([C@@]1(CCC3=C2CC[C@@H]4[C@@]3(CC[C@@H](C4(C)C)O)C)C)C

Properties
Chemical formula	C_{31}H_{52}O
Molar mass	440.756 g·mol^{−1}
- Except where otherwise noted, data are given for materials in their standard state (at 25 °C [77 °F], 100 kPa). Infobox references

Eburicol, or Obtusifoldienol, also called 24-Methylene-24,25-dihydrolanosterol, is a natural, fungus sterol, which can be demethylated by yeast cytochrome P450 sterol 14alpha-demethylase ERG11.
