= Vanadium bromoperoxidase =

Bromoperoxidase/chloroperoxidase, Vanadium

Identifiers
- Symbol: Br/Cl_peroxidase
- CATH: 1qhb
- SCOP2: 1qhb / SCOPe / SUPFAM
- CDD: cd03398

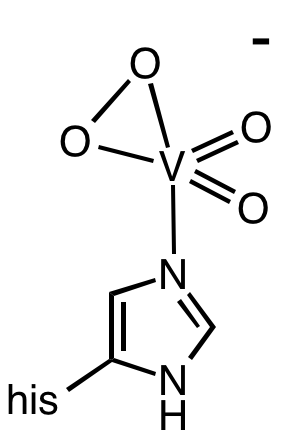
Active site of the enzyme vanadium bromoperoxidase, which produces most of the earth's organobromine compounds.

Vanadium bromoperoxidases are a kind of enzymes called haloperoxidases. Its primary function is to remove hydrogen peroxide which is produced during photosynthesis from in or around the cell. By producing hypobromous acid (HOBr) a secondary reaction with dissolved organic matter, what results is the bromination of organic compounds that are associated with the defense of the organism. These enzymes produce the bulk of natural organobromine compounds in the world.

Vanadium bromoperoxidases are one of the few classes of enzymes that requires vanadium. The active site features a vanadium oxide center attached to the protein via one histidine side chain and a collection of hydrogen bonds to the oxide ligands.

== Occurrence and function ==
Vanadium bromoperoxidases have been found in bacteria, fungi, marine macro algae (seaweeds), and marine microalgae (diatoms) which produce brominated organic compounds. It has not been definitively identified as the bromoperoxidase of higher eukaryotes, such as murex snails, which have a very stable and specific bromoperoxidase, but perhaps not a vanadium dependent one. While the purpose of the bromoperoxidase is still unknown, the leading theories include that it’s a way of regulating hydrogen peroxide produced by photosynthesis and/or as a self-defense mechanism by producing hypobromous acid which prevents the growth of bacteria.

The enzymes catalyse the oxidation of bromide (0.0067% of sea water) by hydrogen peroxide. The resulting electrophilic bromonium cation (Br^{+}) attacks hydrocarbons (symbolized as R-H in the following equation):

R-H + Br^{−} + H_{2}O_{2} → R-Br + H_{2}O + OH^{−}

The bromination acts on a variety of dissolved organic matter and increasingly bromination leads to the formation of bromoform. The vanadium bromoperoxidases produce an estimated 1–2 million tons of bromoform and 56,000 tons of bromomethane annually. Partially in the polar regions, which has high blooms of microalgae in the spring, these compounds have the potential to enter the troposphere and lower stratosphere. Through photolysis, brominated methanes produce a bromine radical (Br^{.}) that can lead to ozone depletion. Most of the earth's natural organobromine compounds arise by the action of this enzyme.
