= Autofluorescence =

Natural emission of light by biological structures

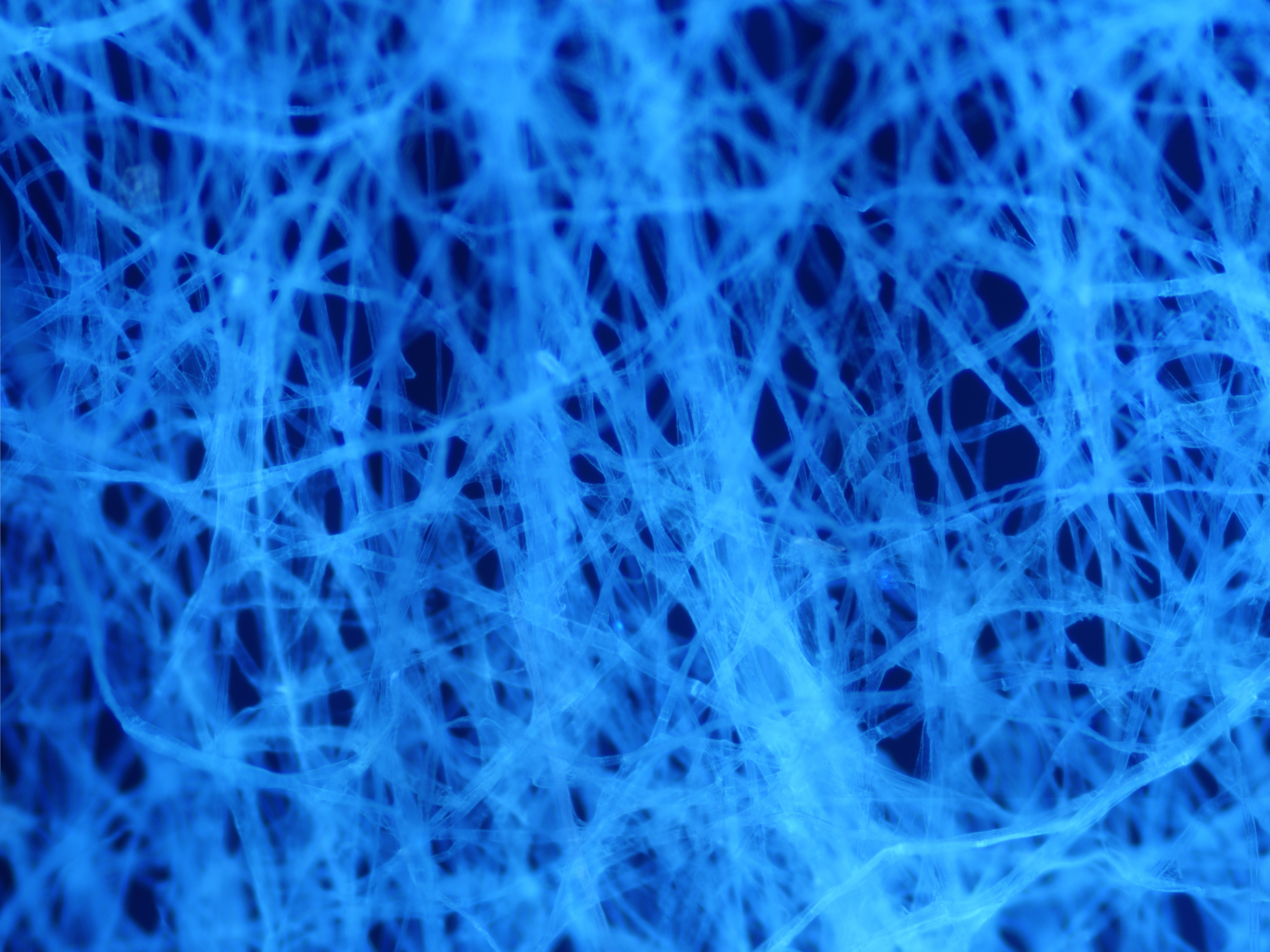
Micrograph of paper autofluorescing under ultraviolet illumination. The individual fibres in this sample are around 10 μm in diameter.

Autofluorescence is the natural fluorescence of biological structures (autofluorophores) such as mitochondria and lysosomes, in contrast to fluorescence originating from artificially added fluorescent markers (fluorophores).

The most commonly observed autofluorescencing molecules are NADPH and flavins; the extracellular matrix can also contribute to autofluorescence because of the intrinsic properties of collagen and elastin.

Generally, proteins containing an increased amount of the amino acids tryptophan, tyrosine, and phenylalanine show some degree of autofluorescence.

Autofluorescence also occurs in non-biological materials found in many papers and textiles. Autofluorescence from U.S. paper money has been demonstrated as a means for discerning counterfeit currency from authentic currency.

== Microscopy ==
A multispectral image of tissue from a mouse intestine, showing how autofluoresce can obscure several fluorescence signals.

Autofluorescence can be problematic in fluorescence microscopy. Light-emitting stains (such as fluorescently labelled antibodies) are applied to samples to enable visualisation of specific structures.

Autofluorescence interferes with detection of specific fluorescent signals, especially when the signals of interest are very dim — it causes structures other than those of interest to become visible.

In some microscopes (mainly confocal microscopes), it is possible to make use of different lifetime of the excited states of the added fluorescent markers and the endogenous molecules to exclude most of the autofluorescence.

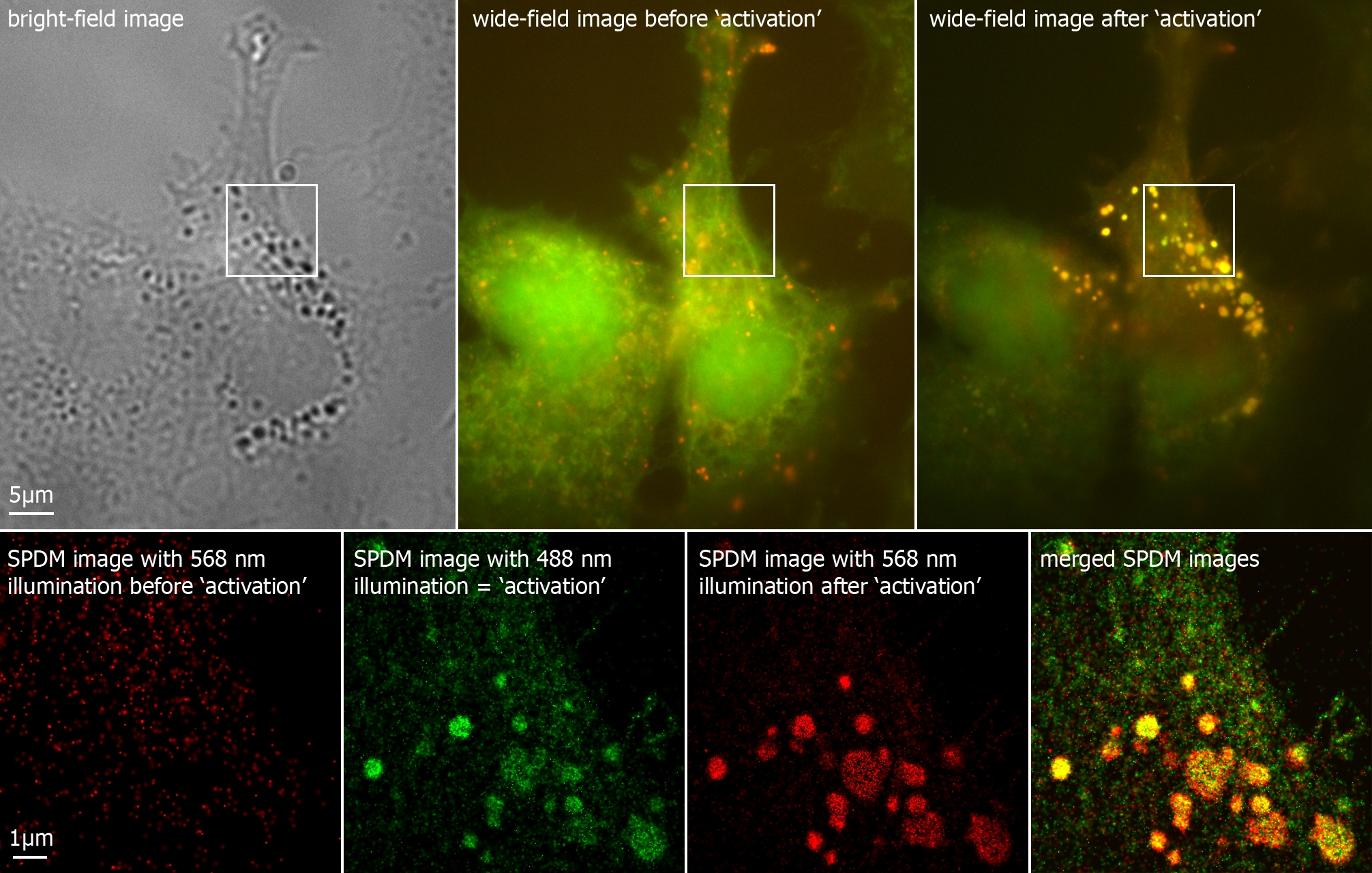
Autofluorescence super resolution microscopy/optical nanoscopy image of cellular structures that are invisible with confocal light microscopy

In a few cases, autofluorescence may actually illuminate the structures of interest, or serve as a useful diagnostic indicator.

For example, cellular autofluorescence can be used as an indicator of cytotoxicity without the need to add fluorescent markers.

The autofluorescence of human skin can be used to measure the level of advanced glycation end-products (AGEs), which are present in higher quantities during several human diseases.

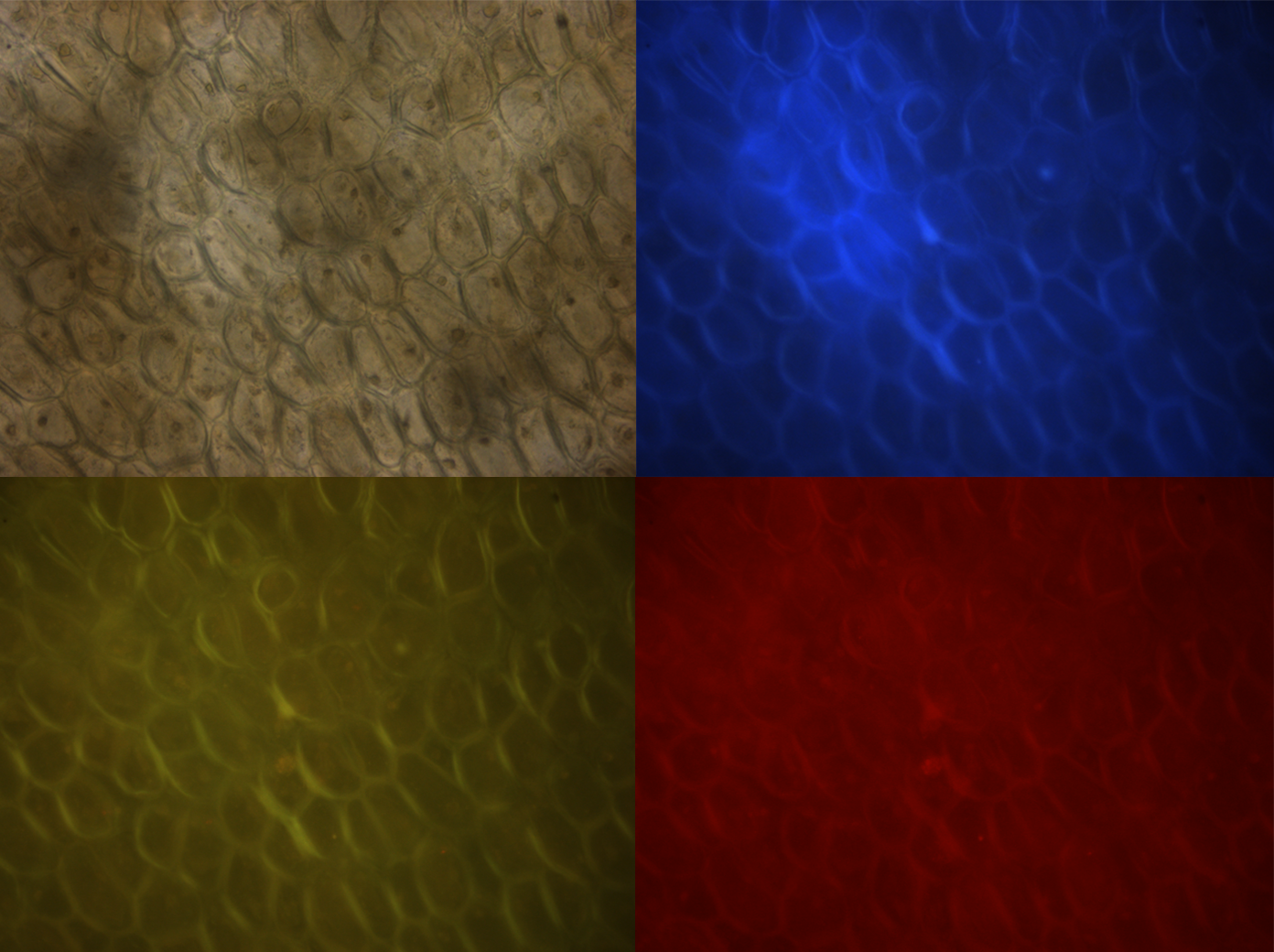
Autofluorescence in banana skin under different light conditions.

Optical imaging systems that utilize multispectral imaging can reduce signal degradation caused by autofluorescence while adding enhanced multiplexing capabilities.

The super resolution microscopy SPDM revealed autofluorescent cellular objects which are not detectable under conventional fluorescence imaging conditions.

== List of dominant autofluorophores ==
| Group | Molecule | Excitation (nm) | Fluorescence (nm) Peak | Animals (Zoae) | Fungi | Plants | Reference |
|---|---|---|---|---|---|---|---|
| | NAD(P)H | 340 | 450 | Z | F | P | |
| | Chlorophyll | 465–665 | 673–726 | | | P | |
| | Collagen | 270–370 | 305–450 | Z | | | |
| | Retinol | | 500 | Z | F | P | |
| | Riboflavin | | 550 | Z | F | P | |
| | Cholecalciferol | | 380–460 | Z | | | |
| | Folic acid | | 450 | Z | F | P | |
| | Pyridoxine | | 400 | Z | F | P | |
| | Tyrosine | 270 | 305 | Z | F | P | |
| | Dityrosine | 325 | 400 | Z | | | |
| | Excimer-like aggregate (collagen) | 270 | 360 | Z | | | |
| | Glycation adduct | 370 | 450 | Z | | | |
| | Indolamine | | | Z | | | |
| | Lipofuscin | 410–470 | 500–695 | Z | F | P | |
| | Lignin (a polyphenol) | 335–488 | 455–535 | | | P | |
| | Tryptophan | 280 | 300–350 | Z | F | P | |
| | Flavin | 380–490 | 520–560 | Z | F | P | |
| | Melanin | 340–400 | 360–560 | Z | F | P | |
| Nicotinamides | Unbound NADH | 250–300 and 300–380 | 420–480 | | | | |
| Nicotinamides | Unbound NADPH | 250–300 and 300–380 | 420–480 | | | | |
| Nicotinamides | Protein-bound NADH | Blue shifts ≈20 nm compared to its unbound form | Blue shifts ≈20 nm compared to unbound form | | | | |
| Nicotinamides | Protein-bound NADPH | Blue shifts ≈20 nm compared to its unbound form | Blue shifts ≈20 nm compared to unbound form | | | | |
| Flavins | Riboflavin (Vitamin B2) | 210–290 and 325–490 | 480–625 and 490–600 | | | | |
| Flavins | Flavin mononucleotide (FMN) | 210–290 and 325–490 | 480–625 and 490–600 | | | | |
| Flavins | Flavin adenine dinucleotide (FAD^{+}) | 210–290 and 325–490 | 480–625 and 490–600 | | | | |
| Collagens | Types 1-28 | 250–450 | 250–550 | | | | |
| Porphyrins | Coproporphyrin I | ≈360–440 | 580–730 | | | | |
| Porphyrins | Protoporphyrin IX | 350–650 | 580–730 | | | | |
| Aromatic amino acids | Tyrosine | 250–325 | 300–400 and 500–600 | | | | |
| Aromatic amino acids | Tryptophan | 250–310 | 300–425 | | | | |
| Aromatic amino acids | Dityrosine | 250–350 | 350–410 | | | | |
| | Elastin | 300–480 | 450–650 | | | | |
| | A2E | 250–550 | 500–750 | | | | |
| | Lipofuscin | 320–480 | 400–700 | | | | |
| | Melanin | 350–600 | 450–800 | | | | |
| | Keratin | 365–460 | 410–600 | | | | |
| Retinols | Retinol | 250–380 | 414–550 | | | | |
| Retinols | Retinol-binding protein (RBP) bound to retinol | 260–400 | 250–575 | | | | |
| Retinols | Unbound RBP | 260–400 | 250–575 | | | | |

Substances luminous in animal tissue are, by taxonomic inclusion, also luminous in human tissue.

== See also ==
- Autoluminescence
- Phosphorescence
- Fluorescence in the life sciences
