= CYP56A1 =

Cytochrome P450-DIT2

Identifiers
- Organism: Saccharomyces cerevisiae S288c
- Symbol: DIT2
- Alt. symbols: CYP56A1
- Entrez: 852011
- Orthologs: NCBI: entry; OMA: entry
- RefSeq (mRNA): NM_001180710.1
- RefSeq (Prot): NP_010690.1
- UniProt: P21595

Other data
- EC number: 1.14.14.-
- Chromosome: XIII: 1.27 - 1.27 Mb
Search for
- Structures: Swiss-model
- Domains: InterPro

Cytochrome P450-DIT2 or CYP56A1 is one of the only three P450 enzyme found in fungi baker's yeast (Saccharomyces cerevisiae), the other two are CYP51F1(ERG11) and CYP61A1(ERG5) in the ergosterol biosynthesis pathway. CYP56A1 thought to catalyze the oxidation of tyrosine residues in the formation of L,L-dityrosine, a precursor of the spore wall.
