= Sodium hypoiodite =

Names
- IUPAC name Sodium hypoiodite

Identifiers
CAS Number	22468-64-0
3D model (JSmol)	Interactive image
ChemSpider	4675298
PubChem CID	23681088
CompTox Dashboard (EPA)	DTXSID80176999
- InChI: InChI=1S/IO.Na/c1-2;/q-1;+1 Key: SAFWHKYSCUAGHQ-UHFFFAOYSA-N
- SMILES: [O-]I.[Na+]

Properties
Chemical formula	INaO
Molar mass	165.893 g·mol^{−1}

Related compounds
Other anions	Sodium iodide; Sodium iodate; Sodium periodate
Other cations	Silver hypoiodite
Related compounds	Hypoiodous acid
- Except where otherwise noted, data are given for materials in their standard state (at 25 °C [77 °F], 100 kPa). Infobox references

Sodium hypoiodite is an inorganic chemical used as an oxidant in various organic chemical reactions. It causes iodination of nitrogen atoms, such 1H-benzotriazole to give 1-iodo-1H-benzotriazole and an imine to give the analogous iodoimine. It oxidatively cleaves methyl ketones to give iodoform.
