= Hypohalous acid =

Class of chemical compounds

A hypohalous acid is an oxyacid consisting of a hydroxyl group single-bonded to any halogen. Examples include hypofluorous acid, hypochlorous acid, hypobromous acid, and hypoiodous acid. The conjugate base is a hypohalite. They can be formed by reacting the corresponding diatomic halogen molecule (F_{2}, Cl_{2}, Br_{2}, I_{2}) with water in the reaction:

X_{2} + H_{2}O ⇌ HXO + HX

This also results in the corresponding hydrogen halide, which is also acidic. A pseudohalogen would instead generate a hypopseudohalous acid.

It is uncertain that whether hypoastatous acid (AtOH), the hypohalous acid for astatine, is more similar to other hypohalous acids or to metal hydroxides.

== Stability ==
Hypohalous acids tend to be unstable. Only hypofluorous acid has been isolated as a solid, and even it is explosive at room temperature. Hypochlorous acid cannot be prepared in anhydrous form. Hypobromous acid, hypoiodous acid, and their conjugate bases (hypobromite and hypoiodite) are also unstable, undergoing disproportionation reactions like

3 BrO^{−}(aq) → 2 Br^{−}(aq) + BrO^{−}_{3}(aq)

and

3 HIO → 2 HI + HIO_{3}

that result in the corresponding hydrogen halides/halide ions and halic acids/halates.

== Uses ==
Hypochlorous acid and hypobromous acid are each dissolved in water to sanitize it, hypochlorous acid in swimming pools and hypobromous acid in hot tubs and spas.

== Acidity ==
Hypohalous acids tend to be weak acids, and they typically get weaker as the halogen progresses further down the periodic table. Hypochlorous acid has a pK_{a} of 7.53. The pK_{a} values of hypobromous acid is higher (meaning that it is an even weaker acid), at 8.65. The pK_{a} of hypoiodous acid is even higher, at 10.6.
