= Bromine water =

Mixture formed from bromide and water group

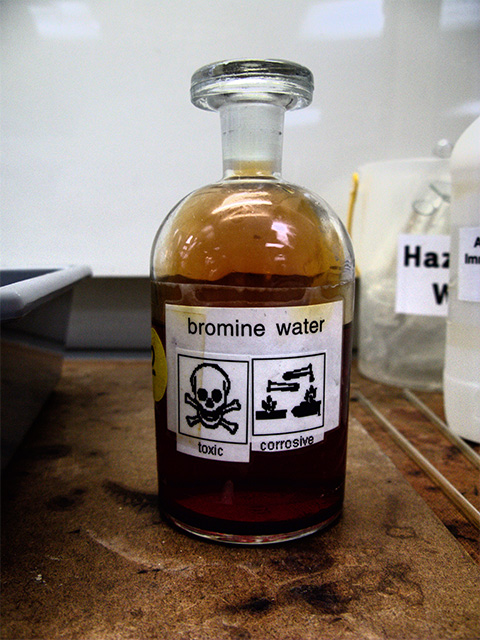
Bromine water, Br_{2}(aq)

Bromine water is an oxidizing, intense brown mixture containing diatomic bromine (Br_{2}) dissolved in water (H_{2}O). It is often used as a reactive in chemical assays of recognition for substances which react with bromine in an aqueous environment with the halogenation mechanism, mainly unsaturated carbon compounds (carbon compounds with at least one double or triple bond). The most common compounds that react well with bromine water are phenols, alkenes, enols, the acetyl group, aniline, and glucose. In addition, bromine water is commonly used to test for the presence of an alkene which contains a double covalent bond, reacting with the bromine water, changing its color from an intense yellow to a colorless solution. Bromine water is also commonly used to check for the presence of an aldehyde group in compounds. In this reaction, the color of bromine water is changed to yellow from colorless (oxidation process).

In a similar vein to neighboring halogens (chlorine and iodine), bromine can also be used at trace concentration to disinfect drinking water with indication for use under high pH or poor water quality.

== Chemical composition ==
While the solubility of bromine in water is 35.5 g/L at 20°C, bromine water is usually prepare as dilute solution (<0.2 M) for safety reason. Bromine undergoes hydrolysis in water yielding hydrobromic acid and hypobromous acid.

Br_{2} + H_{2}O ⇌ HBrO + H^{^{+}} + Br^{^{−}}

The equilibrium constant for this hydrolysis or disproportionation reaction of $K=6.1 \times 10^{-9}$ is very small and thus the concentrations of the two acids are relatively small in bromine water. As hypobromous acid (and to a lesser extent hypobromite) is the active species for the disinfectant property of bromine water, optimum pH for disinfectant by bromine water is between pH 6.0 and 8.5 when hypobromous acid is expected to be the dominant species.

== See also ==
- Water chlorination
- Bromine test
- Tincture of iodine
