= Eosinophil peroxidase =

Protein-coding gene in the species Homo sapiens

EPX

Identifiers
- Aliases: EPX, EPO, EPP, EPX-PEN, EPXD, eosinophil peroxidase
- External IDs: OMIM: 131399; MGI: 107569; GeneCards: EPX
Enzyme activity
EC #	BRENDA	ExPASy	KEGG	MetaCyc
1.11.1.7	↗	↗	↗	↗

Gene location (Human)
Chr.	Chromosome 17 (human)
Band	17q22	Start	58,192,726 bp
Band	17q22	End	58,205,174 bp

Gene location (Mouse)
Chr.	Chromosome 11 (mouse)
Band	11 C|11 52.25 cM	Start	87,754,826 bp
Band	11 C|11 52.25 cM	End	87,766,362 bp
RNA expression pattern
Bgee	Human / Mouse (ortholog); Top expressed in: testicle; trabecular bone; bone marrow; bone marrow cell; cerebellar hemisphere; right hemisphere of cerebellum; right uterine tube; prefrontal cortex; spleen; Brodmann area 9 / Top expressed in: tibiofemoral joint; bone marrow; granulocyte; fetal liver hematopoietic progenitor cell; vestibular membrane of cochlear duct; pituitary gland; chondrocranium; cochlea; spleen; blood; More reference expression data
BioGPS	n/a
Gene ontology
Molecular function	oxidoreductase activity; heme binding; metal ion binding; peroxidase activity
Cellular component	extracellular exosome; extracellular region; extracellular space; secretory granule lumen; cytoplasm
Biological process	cellular oxidant detoxification; eosinophil migration; negative regulation of interleukin-10 production; defense response; negative regulation of interleukin-5 production; response to oxidative stress; positive regulation of interleukin-4 production; defense response to nematode; hydrogen peroxide catabolic process; neutrophil degranulation; defense response to bacterium
Sources:Amigo / QuickGO
Orthologs
Databases	NCBI: entry; OMA: entry
Species	Human	Mouse
Entrez	8288	13861
Ensembl	ENSG00000121053	ENSMUSG00000052234
UniProt	P11678	P49290
RefSeq (mRNA)	NM_000502	NM_007946
RefSeq (protein)	NP_000493	NP_031972
Location (UCSC)	Chr 17: 58.19 – 58.21 Mb	Chr 11: 87.75 – 87.77 Mb
PubMed search
- Wikidata
View/Edit Human	View/Edit Mouse

Eosinophil peroxidase (EPO) is an enzyme found within the eosinophil granulocytes, innate immune cells of humans and mammals. This oxidoreductase protein is encoded by the gene EPX, expressed within these myeloid cells. EPO shares many similarities with its paralogous peroxidases, myeloperoxidase (MPO), lactoperoxidase (LPO), and thyroid peroxidase (TPO). The protein is concentrated in secretory granules within eosinophils. Eosinophil peroxidase is a heme peroxidase, its activities including the oxidation of halide ions to bacteriocidal reactive oxygen species, the cationic disruption of bacterial cell walls, and the post-translational modification of protein amino acid residues.

The major function of eosinophil peroxidase is to catalyze the formation of hypohalous acids from hydrogen peroxide and halide ions in solution. For example:

H_{2}O_{2} + Br^{−} → HOBr + H_{2}O

Hypohalous acids formed from halides or pseudohalides are potent oxidizing agents. (Note: The sodium salt of hypochlorous acid is commonly used as pool bleach.) However, the role of eosinophilic peroxidase seems to be to generate hyphalous acids largely from bromide and iodide rather than chloride, since the former are favored greatly over the latter. The enzyme myeloperoxidase is responsible for formation of most of the hypochlorous acid in the body, and eosinophil peroxidase is responsible for reactions involving bromide and iodide.

== Gene ==
The open reading frame of human eosinophil peroxidase was found to have a length of 2,106 base pairs (bp). This comprises a 381-bp prosequence, a 333-bp sequence encoding the light chain and a 1,392-bp sequence encoding the heavy chain. In addition to these there is a 452-bp untranslated region at the 3' end containing the AATAAA polyadenylation signal.

The promoter sequence for human eosinophil peroxidase is an unusually strong promoter. All the major regulatory elements are located within 100 bp upstream of the gene.

The profile of EPX expression has been characterized and is available online via BioGPS. This dataset indicates that both in humans and mice, EPX is only expressed in the bone marrow. At this level, it is more than 30 times the average level of expression over all tissues in the body.

== Protein ==
- Molecular weight: 57 kDa (heavy chain), 11 kDa (light chain) (predicted); 52 kDa, 15 kDa (observed)
- Isoelectric point pI = 10.31 (predicted); 7.62 (observed)
- Electronic absorption maximum at 413 nm (Soret band)
- Binds 1 equivalent of calcium
- Glycosylated at four asparagine residues: 315, 351, 443, and 695
- One active site per monomer.

The polypeptide chain is processed proteolytically into a heavy and a light chain during maturation. However, the two chains are still intimately connected not least of all by the covalently linked heme cofactor. The protein is produced on ribosomes embedded on the surface of the endoplasmic reticulum, since it must be ultimately localized to the granules. The precursor protein goes through the following processing steps before becoming active:

- ER signal sequence cleavage
- propeptide cleavage
- modification of heme cofactor
- covalent linkage of heme cofactor.

Unlike MPO, heme in EPO is not linked via methionine. This affects the catalytic characteristics (see Active site).

=== Secondary structure ===
Eosinophil peroxidase is a predominately α-helical heme-containing enzyme. The core of the catalytic domain surrounding the active site consists of six α-helices, five from the heavy polypeptide chain and one from the light. The fold of the enzyme is known as the heme peroxidase fold, conserved among all members of this gene family. However, not all members possess peroxidase activity.

The calcium ion binding site has typical pentagonal bipyramidal geometry. It is bound within a loop of eight residues of the heavy chain. Ligands are provided by serine and threonine hydroxyl; backbone carbonyl; and carboxylic acid groups, one of which comes from the light polypeptide chain. The calcium site serves not only as a scaffold for protein folding, but also for proper association of the two chains. In fact, when the calcium ion is removed, the protein precipitates out of solution.

=== Tertiary structure ===
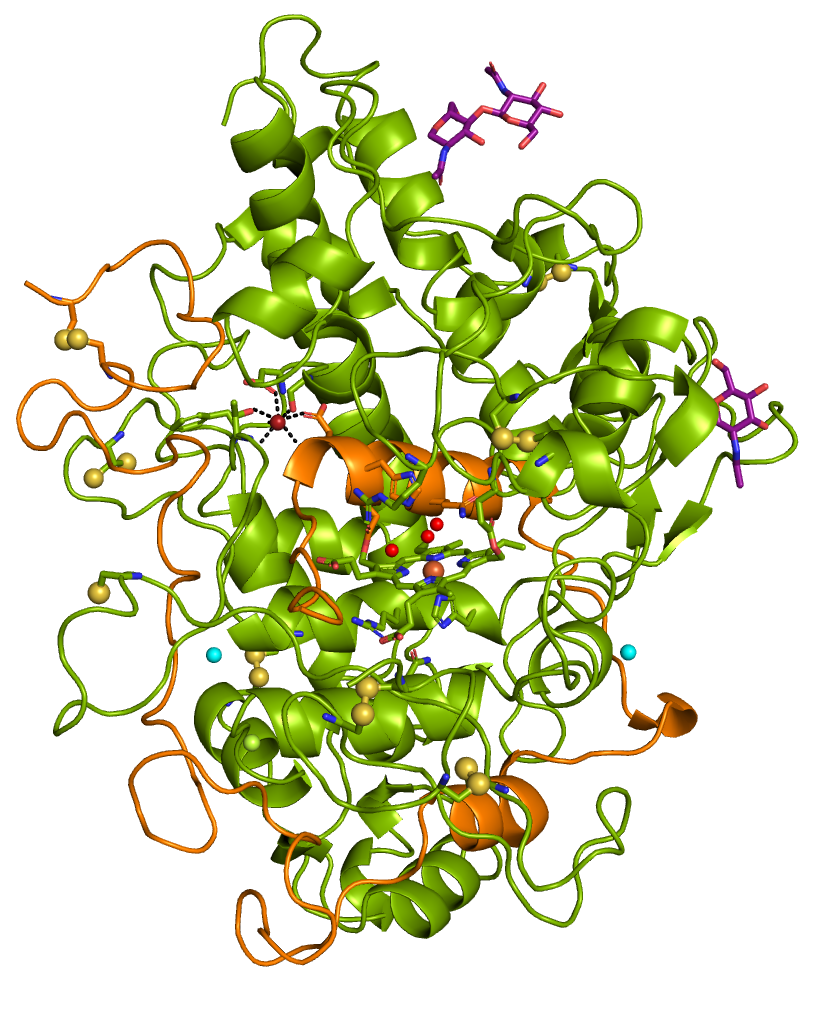
x-ray crystal structure of eosinophil peroxidase (PDB code: 8GOI)

The protein contains only a single modular domain. In this respect it is primarily a metabolic enzyme or terminal effector; it has little role in cellular signalling pathways. The overall structure of the four mammalian heme peroxidases (MPO, LPO, EPO and TPO) is almost identical. However, MPO is unique in existing as a catalytic dimer bridged by a disulphide bond. One of the first aspects known of eosinophil peroxidase was that it was highly cationic, as indicated by its high isoelectric point (see Protein). Eosinophil peroxidase has been characterized by X-ray crystallography. A direct correspondence between the absorption spectra of EPO, TPO and LPO as well as high sequence similarity allows us to compare the properties of the three. Myeloperoxidase's characteristics are somewhat different, owing to its multimerization state as well as its alternative heme linkage.

The fold is highly conserved and seems to be optimized for catalytic function. However, differences exist which unsurprisingly account for differences in substrate specificity among peroxidases. This furcation is commonplace in the study of protein evolution. Structural features which are highly necessary for function are subjected to strong conservation pressure, while regions distant from the active site undergo genetic drift. This can lead to the specialization or differentiation of function arising from modification of an enzymatic core moiety. For example, the closely related thyroid peroxidase catalyzes a specific oxidation reaction in the biosynthesis of a hormone, while other heme peroxidases fulfill roles in immune defense and redox signalling.

=== Quaternary structure ===
Human EPO is known to exist as a soluble monomer.

== Active site ==
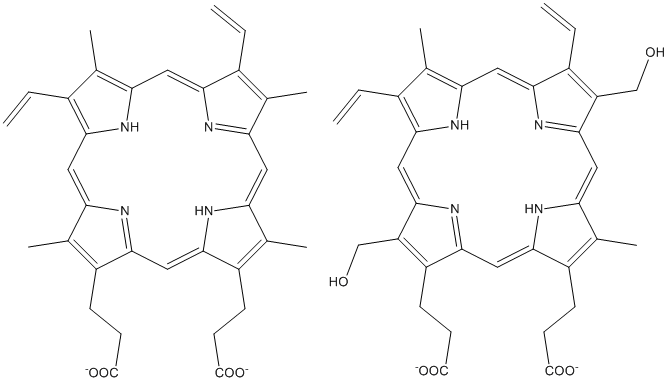
Left: protoporphyrin IX. Right: modified form of heme cofactor released from peroxidase by protease digestion under nonreducing conditions.

The active site of eosinophil peroxidase contains a single iron atom in tetradentate complexation with a protoporphyrin IX cofactor. It is notable in that this prosthetic group is linked covalently to the polypeptide via ester bonds. Asp232 and Glu380 of EPO are covalently linked through their terminal oxygen atoms to the modified side chains of the protoporphyrin. For comparison, in myeloperoxidase, there is a third attachment point, Met243 forming a sulphonium ion bridge with the pendant vinyl group on heme. This feature is absent in EPO and the corresponding residue is threonine.

The fifth ligand of iron is a conserved histidine residue, hydrogen bonded directly to an asparagine residue. These two critical residues ensure that iron has an appropriate Fe(III)/Fe(II) reduction potential for catalysis. The sixth ligands of iron are said to be located on the distal side of the heme group. These include a short water network comprising five molecules; stabilized by hydrogen bonding with histidine, glutamine, and arginine residues. The distal face is used for substrate binding and catalysis.

The crystal structures of MPO have been solved both in native states and with inhibitors bound and are deposited in the Protein Data Bank under the accession numbers 1CXP, 1D5L, 1D2V, and 1D7W.

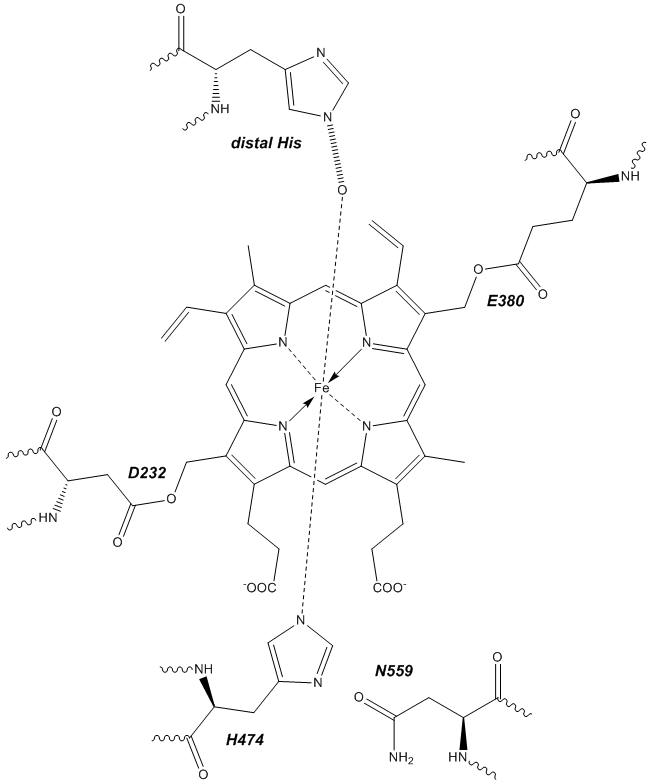
Active site of eosinophil peroxidase in the resting (reduced) state. Pictured: Proximal histidine-asparagine interaction (bottom); distal histidine and bound water (top). In the oxidized form, the oxyferryl radical takes the place of the bound solvent molecule, and the halide substrate binds alongside that. Not pictured: other bound solvent water molecules. Refer to PDB crystal structures or refs. and.

=== Mechanism ===
The basic mechanism of heme peroxidases consists in using hydrogen peroxide to produce an activated form of the heme cofactor, in which iron takes the oxidation state +4. The activated oxygen may then be transferred to a substrate in order to convert it into a reactive oxygen species. There are three distinct cycles which EPO can undergo. The first is the halogenation cycle:

[Fe(III)...Por] + H_{2}O_{2} → [Fe(IV)=O...Por^{•+}] + H_{2}O

where Por denotes the heme cofactor, and • denotes a chemical radical. This activated state of heme is called compound I. In this state oxygen could be described as an oxyferryl species. It's thought that the pi-cation porphyrin radical undergoes reactivity at the methine bridges connecting the four rings. Compound I reduction in the presence of halides X^{−} proceeds as follows:

[Fe(IV)=O...Por^{•+}] + X^{−} → [Fe(III)...Por] + HOX

Thus, compound I is reduced back to the enzyme's resting state, and halide ions bound in the distal cavity are oxidized to potent oxidizing agents.

However, there is a second cycle wherein compound I can proceed via two one-electron reduction steps to oxidize arbitrary substrates to their radical forms. This process operates on the majority of non-halide substrates. The first step is identical followed by:

[Fe(IV)=O...Por^{•+}] + RH → [Fe(IV)=O...Por] + R^{•} + H^{+}
[Fe(IV)=O...Por] + RH → [Fe(IV)=O...Por] + R^{•} + H_{2}O

The new intermediate state is also called compound II. The physiological implications of this second mechanism are important. Unlike its paralogs, eosinophil peroxidase has been demonstrated to nitrate tyrosine residues on proteins in vivo, which has also been implicated in reactive oxygen signalling cascades. (Nitration starts with NO2- instead of RH and NO2^{•} instead of R^{•}. Nitrite is mainly a substrate of the latter reaction.)

The third and less relevant mechanism is the catalase activity of peroxidases. This mechanism appears to operate only in the absence of one-electron donors.

[Fe(IV)=O...Por^{•+}] + H_{2}O_{2} → [Fe(III)...Por] + O_{2} + H_{2}O

=== Substrates ===
Eosinophil peroxidase catalyzes the haloperoxidase reaction. EPO can take chloride, bromide and iodide as substrates, as well as the pseudohalide thiocyanate (SCN^{−}). However, the enzyme prefers bromide over chloride, iodide over bromide and thiocyanate over iodide, with regard to reaction velocities. In fact, only myeloperoxidase can oxidize chloride with any considerable rate. The rate of iodide catalysis is five orders of magnitude greater than the rate of chloride catalysis, for comparison. The mutant of MPO wherein heme-linked Met243 was mutated nonconservatively showed a lack of chlorination ability, implicating this residue or its peculiar functional group in substrate specificity.

=== Inhibitors ===
Cyanide binds very tightly to mammalian heme peroxidases. Tight binding directly to heme iron converts the protein to a low-spin species. Binding of cyanide requires the deprotonated form of a group with pK_{a} of 4.0-4.3. This appears to be the distal histidine residue. The structure of the ternary complex of MPO, cyanide and bromide is thought to be a good model for the compound I-halide complex due to its similar geometry (cf. 1D7W).

The nitrite ion also binds tightly, forming low-spin heme. Inhibition by nitrite is due to accumulation of compound II and is reversible by tyrosine.

== Mutants ==
One of the first well-characterized mutants of EPX was a G→A transition (g.9267G>A, rs121434566) resulting in a nonconservative mutation at the protein level (p.Arg286His). The phenotype is a hereditary deficiency of EPO.

== Cytology ==
Large multicellular organisms engage multiple systems as defensive efforts against infecting bacteria or invading parasites. One strategy, which falls under the domain of cellular immunity, depends on the action of enzymes which catalyze the peroxidase reaction. Eosinophil peroxidase can be found in the primary (azurophilic) granules of human and mammalian leukocytes. Peroxidase localization in leukocytes has been studied throughout the 20th century using staining agents such as benzidine hydrochloride. Before the introduction of specific immunoreactive staining, such chemical indicators of enzymatic activity were commonplace. Following the advent of the electron microscope, the ultrastructure of many cell types was vigorously investigated. Subsequently, eosinophil peroxidase was found to be localized to primary and secondary granules of the eosinophil.

Eosinophils form part of the myelocytic lineage, one of two major classes of bone-marrow-derived cell types (along with the lymphocytes) which circulate in the blood and lymph and play critical roles in immune responses. Eosinophil peroxidase is secreted by eosinophil cells into the tissue at the site of infection. Activation of cells in the face of an infection leads to the release of granule contents and externalization of protein and chemical agents from the cell.

Having diverged from myeloperoxidase and lactoperoxidase, these three enzymes now perform distinct but not non-overlapping roles; lactoperoxidase helps maintain the sterility of mammalian milk; myeloperoxidase and eosinophil peroxidase inhabit granules and play roles in host defense—an example of how the concept of a single chemical function can be harnessed in myriad ways in nature.

== Deficiency and disease ==
Specific deficiency of eosinophil peroxidase without concomitant deficiency of myeloperoxidase is rare. In a clinical setting, deficiencies of leukocyte enzymes are conveniently studied by optical flow cytometry. Specific deficiencies of myeloperoxidase were known since the 1970s. Myeloperoxidase deficiency resulted in an absence of peroxidase staining in neutrophils but not eosinophils. Early studies on myeloperoxidase deficiency revealed that the most common disease variants were missense mutations, including that of the heme-linked methionine residue. This deficiency was often not inherited as a simple autosomal recessive trait but rather as a compound heterozygous mutation. It is thought that patients with myeloperoxidase deficiency have an increased incidence of malignant tumours. However, they do not have a significantly increased rate of infection, owing to redundancy in peroxidase-mediated immune mechanisms.

== See also ==
- Eosinophil
- Major basic protein
- Secretory pathway
- Peroxiredoxin
- Catalase
- Reactive oxygen species
- Antimicrobial peptides
