= 2-Phenylethyl bromide =

Names
- Preferred IUPAC name (2-Bromoethyl)benzene
- Other names Phenethyl bromide

Identifiers
CAS Number	103-63-9
3D model (JSmol)	Interactive image
ChemSpider	7383
ECHA InfoCard	100.002.846
PubChem CID	7666
UNII	96O442668X
CompTox Dashboard (EPA)	DTXSID1033876
- InChI: InChI=1S/C8H9Br/c9-7-6-8-4-2-1-3-5-8/h1-5H,6-7H2 Key: WMPPDTMATNBGJN-UHFFFAOYSA-N; InChI=1/C8H9Br/c9-7-6-8-4-2-1-3-5-8/h1-5H,6-7H2 Key: WMPPDTMATNBGJN-UHFFFAOYAQ
- SMILES: BrCCc1ccccc1

Properties
Chemical formula	C_{8}H_{9}Br
Molar mass	185.064 g·mol^{−1}
Appearance	Colorless liquid
Density	1.355 g/cm^{3}
Melting point	−56 °C (−69 °F; 217 K)
Boiling point	221 °C (430 °F; 494 K)
Solubility in water	Insoluble in water

Hazards
Flash point	89 °C (192 °F; 362 K)
- Except where otherwise noted, data are given for materials in their standard state (at 25 °C [77 °F], 100 kPa). verify (what is ?) Infobox references

2-Phenylethyl bromide is an organobromide with the formula C_{6}H_{5}CH_{2}CH_{2}Br. It is a colorless liquid, although older samples appear yellow. Analogous to the preparation of most 1-bromoalkanes, it is prepared by free-radical addition of hydrogen bromide to styrene. These conditions lead to anti-Markovnikov addition, giving the 1-bromo derivatives.

Upon reaction with hydrazine, phenelzine is produced.

It can be used to produce fentanyl and is on the Special Surveillance List of the DEA.
