= Lithium hypofluorite =

Names
- Preferred IUPAC name Lithium hypofluorite
- Other names Lithium fluoride oxide, lithium oxyfluoride

Identifiers
CAS Number	34240-84-1
3D model (JSmol)	Interactive image
ChemSpider	20478385
PubChem CID	23678220
CompTox Dashboard (EPA)	DTXSID90187814
- InChI: InChI=1S/FO.Li/c1-2;/q-1;+1 Key: WYWLSUBVZXKJGO-UHFFFAOYSA-N
- SMILES: [Li+].[O-]F

Properties
Chemical formula	LiOF
Molar mass	41.94 g·mol^{−1}

Related compounds
Related compounds	Lithium fluoride; Lithium hypochlorite
- Except where otherwise noted, data are given for materials in their standard state (at 25 °C [77 °F], 100 kPa). Infobox references

Lithium hypofluorite is an inorganic compound with the chemical formula of LiOF. It is a compound of lithium, fluorine, and oxygen. This is a lithium salt of hypofluorous acid, and contains lithium cations Li^{+} and hypofluorite anions ^{−}OF.

== Synthesis ==
The salt theoretically results from the neutralization of hypofluorous acid (HOF) and lithium hydroxide (LiOH). It can be formed by the action of fluorine on lithium hydroxide:

HOF + LiOH → LiOF + H_{2}O

== Chemical properties ==
The compound is quite unstable, since it contains oxygen in the oxidation state of 0. It, therefore, tends to decompose to lithium fluoride and oxygen gas:

2 LiOF → 2 LiF + O_{2}
