= Hypofluorous acid =

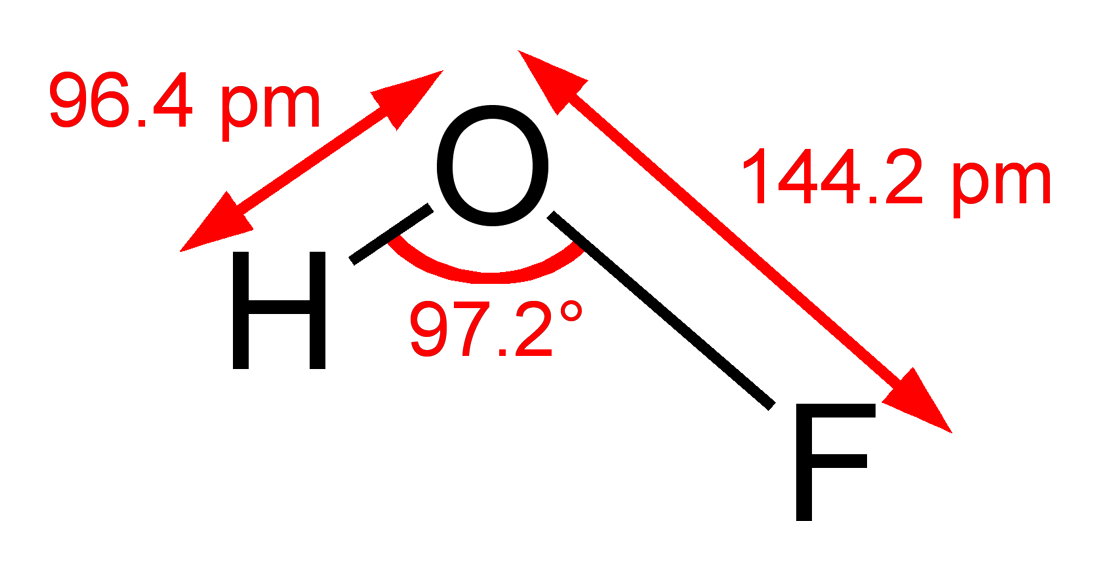
- Hypofluorous acid Gas-phase structure

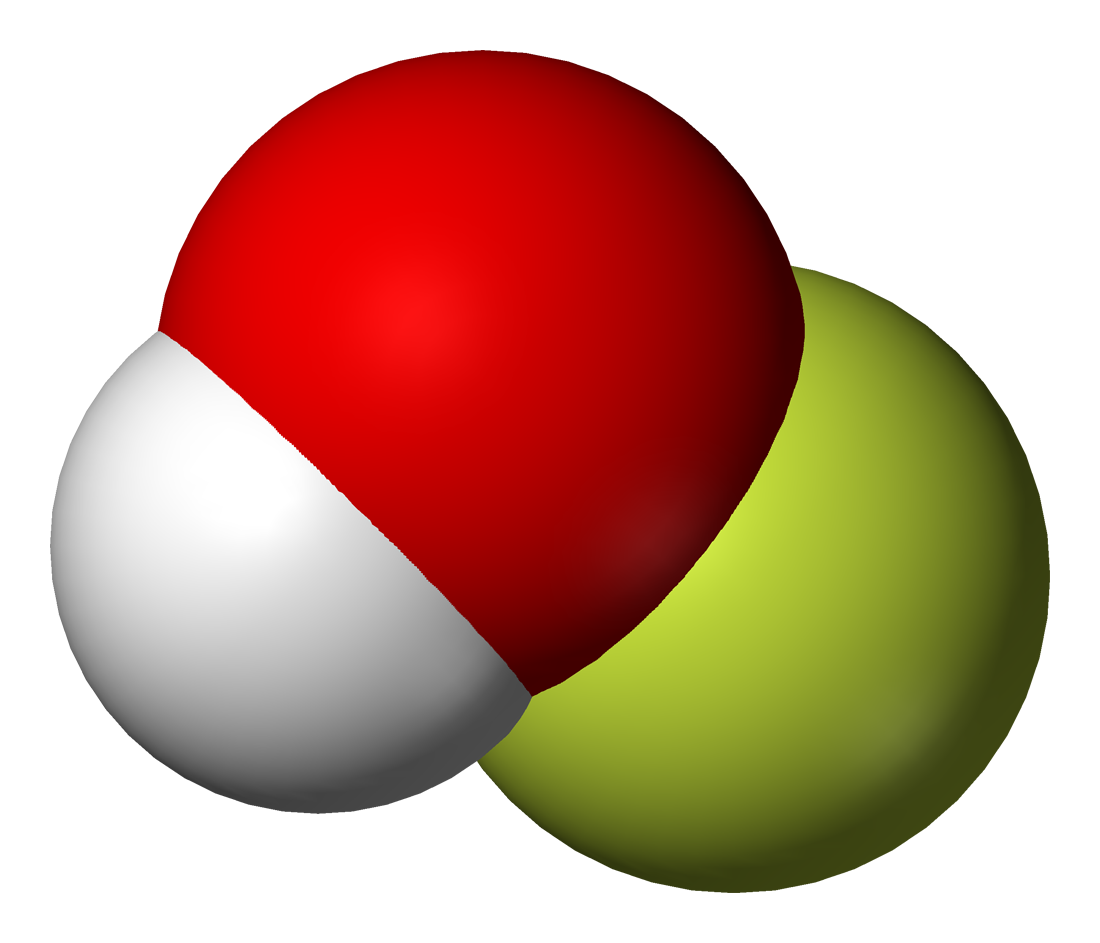
- Hypofluorous acid Hydrogen, H Oxygen, O Fluorine, F

Names
- IUPAC name Hypofluorous acid
- Other names: Fluoranol; Fluoric(-I) acid; Hydrogen hypofluorite; Hydrogen fluorate(-I); Hydrogen monofluoroxygenate(0); Hydroxyl fluoride

Identifiers
CAS Number	14034-79-8
3D model (JSmol)	Interactive image
ChemSpider	109936
PubChem CID	123334
CompTox Dashboard (EPA)	DTXSID10896951
- InChI: InChI=1S/FHO/c1-2/h2H Key: AQYSYJUIMQTRMV-UHFFFAOYSA-N; InChI=1/FHO/c1-2/h2H Key: AQYSYJUIMQTRMV-UHFFFAOYAN
- SMILES: OF

Properties
Chemical formula	HOF
Molar mass	36.005 g·mol^{−1}
Appearance	pale yellow liquid above −117 °C white solid below −117 °C
Melting point	−117 °C (−179 °F; 156 K)
Boiling point	decomposes at 0 °C (32 °F; 273 K)

Structure
Point group	C_{s}

Hazards
- Occupational safety and health (OHS/OSH)
Main hazards	Explosive, strong oxidizer, corrosive
NFPA 704 (fire diamond)	4 0 4 OX

Related compounds
Other cations	Lithium hypofluorite
Related compounds	Hypochlorous acid; Hypobromous acid; Hypoiodous acid; Hydroxylamine; Methanol; Trifluoromethanol; Trifluoromethyl hypofluorite; Oxygen difluoride; Nitroxyl; Hydrogen cyanide; Formaldehyde; Formyl fluoride; Carbonyl fluoride
- Except where otherwise noted, data are given for materials in their standard state (at 25 °C [77 °F], 100 kPa). verify (what is ?) Infobox references

Hypofluorous acid, chemical formula HOF, is the only known oxyacid of fluorine and the only known oxoacid in which the main atom gains electrons from oxygen to create a negative oxidation state. The oxidation state of the oxygen in this acid (and in the hypofluorite ion OF^{−} and in its salts called hypofluorites) is 0, while its valence is 2. It is also the only hypohalous acid that can be isolated as a solid. HOF is an intermediate in the oxidation of water by fluorine, which produces hydrogen fluoride, oxygen difluoride, hydrogen peroxide, ozone and oxygen. HOF is explosive at room temperature, forming HF and O_{2}:

2 HOF → 2 HF + O_{2}

This reaction is catalyzed by water.

It was isolated in the pure form by passing F_{2} gas over ice at −40 °C, rapidly collecting the HOF gas away from the ice, and condensing it:

F_{2} + H_{2}O → HOF + HF

The compound has been characterized in the solid phase by X-ray crystallography as a bent molecule with an angle of 101°. The O–F and O–H bond lengths are 144.2 and 96.4 picometres, respectively. The solid framework consists of chains with O–H···O linkages. The structure has also been analyzed in the gas phase, a state in which the H–O–F bond angle is slightly narrower (97.2°).

Chemists commonly call a solution of hypofluorous acid in acetonitrile (generated in situ by passing gaseous fluorine through water in acetonitrile) Rozen's reagent.

== Difference from other hypohalous acids ==
The formal oxidation state of oxygen in hypofluorous acid and hypofluorite is 0; the same oxidation state found in molecular oxygen. In most oxygen compounds, including the other hypohalous acids, oxygen takes on a state of −2. The oxygen (0) atom is the root of hypofluorous acid's strength as an oxidizer, in contrast to the halogen (+1) atom in other hypohalic acids.

This alters the acid's chemistry. Where reduction of a general hypohalous acid reduces the halogen atom and yields the corresponding elemental halogen gas,

2 HOX + 2 H^{+} + 2 e^{−} → 2 H_{2}O + X_{2}

reduction of hypofluorous acid instead reduces the oxygen atom and yields fluoride directly.

HOF + H^{+} + 2 e^{−} → H_{2}O + F^{−}

Unlike other hypohalous acids, HOF is a weaker oxidant than elemental fluorine.

== Hypofluorites ==
Hypofluorites are formally derivatives of OF^{−}, which is the conjugate base of hypofluorous acid. One example is trifluoromethyl hypofluorite (CF_{3}OF), which is a trifluoromethyl ester of hypofluorous acid. The conjugate base is known in salts such as lithium hypofluorite.

== See also ==
- Hypochlorous acid, a related compound that is more technologically important but has not been obtained in pure form.
