= Hypohalite =

Hypohalites are chemical compounds containing the hypohalite ion, with the general formula XO⁻, where X is a halogen element from Group 17 of the periodic table (fluorine, chlorine, bromine, or iodine). Hypohalites are the conjugate bases of hypohalous acids (HOX) and represent the lowest oxidation state (+1) of halogens in their oxoanions. The pseudohalogen analogues are hypopseudohalites.

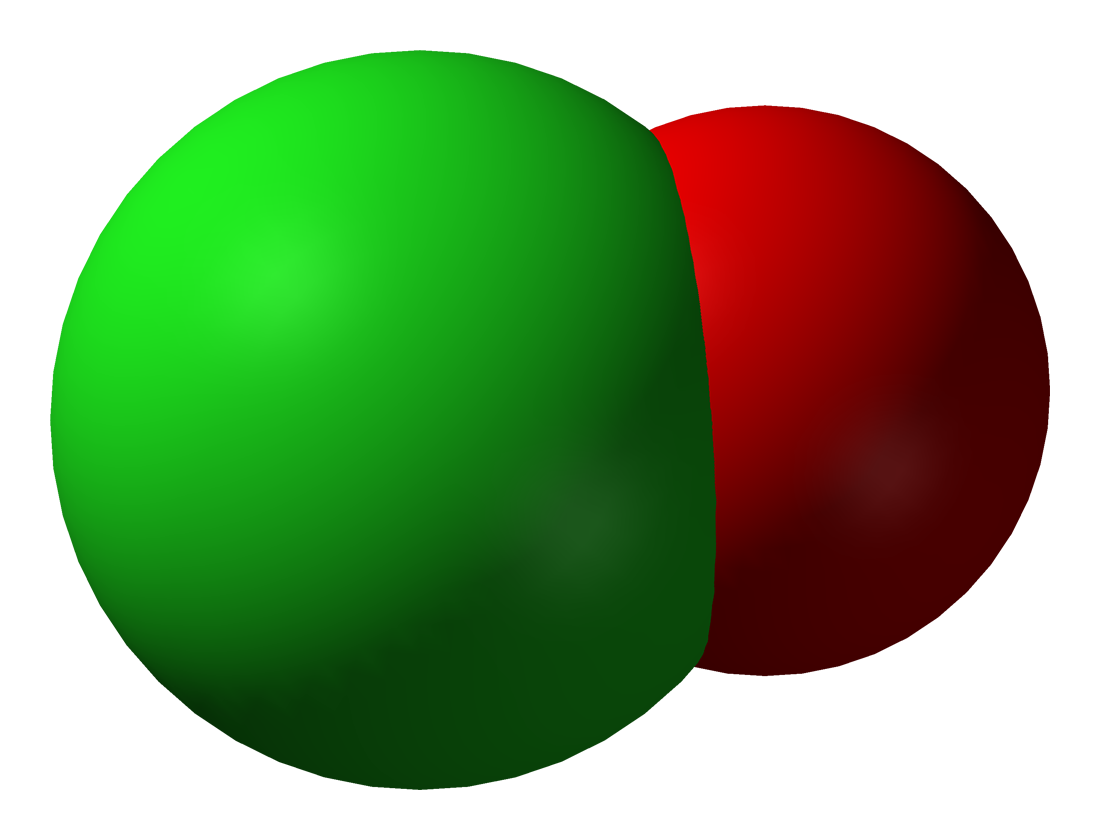
Hypochlorite (ClO^{−})

Hypohalites, especially hypochlorite and hypobromite, are commonly used as disinfectants. In human bodies, the animal heme-dependent peroxidases of the immune system produce hypohalites (OCl⁻, OBr⁻, OI⁻) and hypothiocyanite as a weapon. Hypohalites are also encountered in organic chemistry, often as acyl hypohalites (see the Hunsdiecker reaction). Sodium hypohalite is used in the haloform reaction as a test for methyl ketones. In human bodies, the generate hypohalites and hypopseudohalites are generated by ]

== Structure ==
The hypohalite ion consists of a halogen atom covalently bonded to an oxygen atom, carrying an overall negative charge. The halogen is in the +1 oxidation state, and the oxygen is in the usual −2 state. The general formula is:

$\ce{XO-}$

- $\ce{X}$ is the halogen atom, and
- $\ce{O}$ is the oxygen atom

The Cl-O bond length in crystalline sodium hypochlorite pentahydrate, NaOCl·5H_{2}O, is 1.686 Å, while in sodium hypobromite pentahydrate, NaOBr·5H_{2}O, the Br–O bond length is 8% longer at 1.820 Å.
