= 1,1,1-Tribromoethane =

Names
- Preferred IUPAC name 1,1,1-Tribromoethane
- Other names Methyl bromoform

Identifiers
CAS Number	2311-14-0
3D model (JSmol)	Interactive image
ChemSpider	121202
PubChem CID	137540
UNII	RG8KG3KW75
CompTox Dashboard (EPA)	DTXSID20945787
- InChI: InChI=1S/C2H3Br3/c1-2(3,4)5/h1H3 Key: ZDUOUNIIAGIPSD-UHFFFAOYSA-N
- SMILES: CC(Br)(Br)Br

Properties
Chemical formula	C_{2}H_{3}Br_{3}
Molar mass	266.758 g·mol^{−1}
Appearance	White solid
Melting point	30 °C (86 °F; 303 K)
- Except where otherwise noted, data are given for materials in their standard state (at 25 °C [77 °F], 100 kPa). Infobox references

1,1,1-Tribromoethane is a haloalkane with the chemical formula C_{2}H_{3}Br_{3}.
