= Myeloperoxidase =

Enzyme in neutrophils and other immune cells

MPO
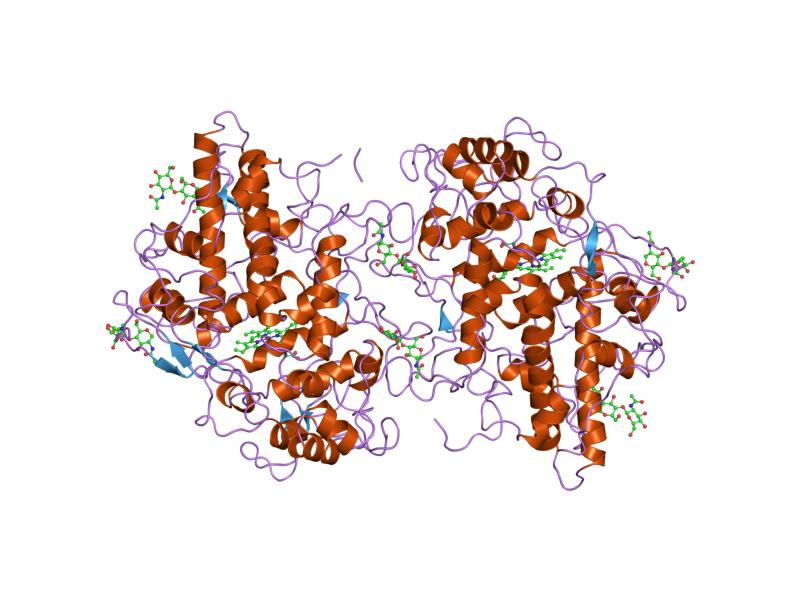

Identifiers
- Aliases: MPO, myeloperoxidase
- External IDs: OMIM: 606989; MGI: 97137; GeneCards: MPO
Available structures
PDB	Ortholog search: PDBe RCSB
PDB	List of PDB id codes 1CXP, 1D2V, 1D5L, 1D7W, 1DNU, 1DNW, 1MHL, 1MYP, 3F9P, 3ZS0, 3ZS1, 4DL1, 4EJX, 4C1M, 5FIW
Enzyme activity
EC #	BRENDA	ExPASy	KEGG	MetaCyc
1.11.2.2	↗	↗	↗	↗

Gene location (Human)
Chr.	Chromosome 17 (human)
Band	17q22	Start	58,269,855 bp
Band	17q22	End	58,280,935 bp

Gene location (Mouse)
Chr.	Chromosome 11 (mouse)
Band	11 52.22 cM|11 C	Start	87,684,407 bp
Band	11 52.22 cM|11 C	End	87,695,239 bp
RNA expression pattern
Bgee	Human / Mouse (ortholog); Top expressed in: trabecular bone; bone marrow cell; monocyte; olfactory zone of nasal mucosa; gonad; granulocyte; testicle; spleen; amniotic fluid; blood / Top expressed in: tibiofemoral joint; fetal liver hematopoietic progenitor cell; granulocyte; body of femur; ankle joint; bone marrow; human fetus; vestibular membrane of cochlear duct; spleen; yolk sac; More reference expression data
BioGPS	n/a
Gene ontology
Molecular function	metal ion binding; heme binding; heparin binding; chromatin binding; oxidoreductase activity; peroxidase activity
Cellular component	mitochondrion; lysosome; secretory granule; azurophil granule; extracellular exosome; nucleus; extracellular region; extracellular space; azurophil granule lumen; intracellular membrane-bounded organelle; cytoplasm; phagocytic vesicle lumen
Biological process	low-density lipoprotein particle remodeling; defense response to fungus; response to mechanical stimulus; removal of superoxide radicals; hypochlorous acid biosynthetic process; negative regulation of apoptotic process; response to lipopolysaccharide; response to gold nanoparticle; response to yeast; hydrogen peroxide catabolic process; response to oxidative stress; ageing; response to food; respiratory burst involved in defense response; defense response; defense response to bacterium; neutrophil degranulation; cell redox homeostasis
Sources:Amigo / QuickGO
Orthologs
Databases	NCBI: entry; OMA: entry
Species	Human	Mouse
Entrez	4353	17523
Ensembl	ENSG00000005381	ENSMUSG00000009350
UniProt	P05164	P11247
RefSeq (mRNA)	NM_000250	NM_010824
RefSeq (protein)	NP_000241	NP_034954
Location (UCSC)	Chr 17: 58.27 – 58.28 Mb	Chr 11: 87.68 – 87.7 Mb
PubMed search
- Wikidata
View/Edit Human	View/Edit Mouse

Myeloperoxidase

Identifiers
- EC no.: 1.11.2.2

Databases
- BRENDA: enzyme data
- ExPASy: NiceZyme view
- KEGG: enzyme entry
- MetaCyc: metabolic pathway
- Rhea: reactions
- PDB structures: RCSB PDB PDBe PDBsum
Search
- PMC: articles
- PubMed: articles
- NCBI: proteins

Myeloperoxidase (MPO) is a peroxidase enzyme that produces various acids within neutrophils. In humans it is encoded by the MPO gene on chromosome 17. MPO is most abundantly expressed in neutrophils (a subtype of white blood cells). It produces hypohalous acids to carry out their antimicrobial activity, including hypochlorous acid, the sodium salt of which is the chemical in bleach. It is a lysosomal protein stored in azurophilic granules of the neutrophil and released into the extracellular space during degranulation. It also serves as a biomarker of inflammation and is predictive of heart attacks and some cancers.

Myeloperoxidase is found in many different organisms including mammals, birds, fish, reptiles, and amphibians. Myeloperoxidase deficiency is a well-documented disease among humans resulting in impaired immune function.

== Structure ==
Neutrophil myeloperoxidase has a heme pigment, which causes its green color in secretions rich in neutrophils, such as mucus and sputum. The green color contributed to its outdated name verdoperoxidase.

The 150 kDa MPO protein is a cationic heterotetramer consisting of two 15-kDa light chains and two variable-weight glycosylated heavy chains bound to a prosthetic heme group complex with calcium ions, arranged as a homodimer of heterodimers. Both are proteolytically generated from the precursor peptide encoded by the MPO gene. The light chains are glycosylated and contain the modified iron protoporphyrin IX active site. Together, the light and heavy chains form two identical 73-kDa monomers connected by a cystine bridge at Cys153. The protein forms a deep crevice which holds the heme group at the bottom, as well as a hydrophobic pocket at the entrance to the distal heme cavity which carries out its catalytic activity.

Variation in glycosylation and the identity of the heavy chain lead to variations in molecular weight within the 135-200 kDa range. In mice, three isoforms exist, differing only by the heavy chain.

One of the ligands is the carbonyl group of Asp 96. Calcium-binding is important for structure of the active site because of Asp 96's close proximity to the catalytic His95 side chain.

=== Reaction mechanism ===
MPO, in the presence of hydrogen peroxide, can catalyze oxidation of chloride, bromide, iodide and thiocyanate ions. The central heme group acts as the active site. The reaction starts when hydrogen peroxide donates an oxygen to the heme group, converting it to Compound I, an activated form. This compound then oxidizes the ions to form the corresponding Hypohalous acid and Compound II, which can be reduced to its original heme state. This cycle continues as long as the immune system requires.

== Function ==
MPO is a member of the XPO subfamily of peroxidases and produces hypochlorous acid (HOCl) from hydrogen peroxide (H_{2}O_{2}) and chloride anion (Cl^{−}) (or hypobromous acid if Br- is present) during the neutrophil's defensive respiratory burst. It requires heme as a cofactor. Furthermore, it oxidizes tyrosine to tyrosyl radical using hydrogen peroxide as an oxidizing agent.

However, this hypochlorous acid may also cause oxidative damage in host tissue. Moreover, MPO oxidation of apoA-I reduces HDL-mediated inhibition of apoptosis and inflammation. In addition, MPO mediates protein nitrosylation and the formation of 3-chlorotyrosine and dityrosine post-translational modifications.

Myeloperoxidase is the first and so far only human enzyme known to break down carbon nanotubes, allaying a concern among clinicians that using nanotubes for targeted delivery of medicines would lead to an unhealthy buildup of nanotubes in tissues.

=== Role in innate immunity ===
Neutrophils use myeloperoxidase to produce the substances needed for their respiratory burst. Hypochlorous acid and tyrosyl radical are cytotoxic, hence they are used by the neutrophil to kill bacteria and certain types of fungi.

== Clinical significance ==
=== Myeloperoxidase deficiency ===
Myeloperoxidase deficiency is a hereditary deficiency of the enzyme, which causes a mild immune deficiency against certain pathogens. People with myeloperoxidase deficiency are most at risk of infection by Candida species, which are pathogenic fungi. The most common species found in humans is Candida albicans. There may be an increased risk of certain other infections, such as with Klebsiella pneumoniae, but recurrent candidiasis is the only common clinical consequence, if the patient is noticeably affected at all.

=== Vasculitis ===
Antibodies against MPO have been implicated in various types of vasculitis, most prominently three clinically and pathologically recognized forms: granulomatosis with polyangiitis (GPA), microscopic polyangiitis (MPA); and eosinophilic granulomatosis with polyangiitis (EGPA). Antibodies are also known as anti-neutrophil cytoplasmic antibodies (ANCAs), though ANCAs have also been detected in staining of the perinuclear region.

=== Atherosclerosis and heart disease ===
Myeloperoxidase is known to contribute to atherosclerosis and diseases related to it, including coronary artery disease. MPO oxidizes LDL cholesterol, and as a result, the LDL receptor in liver cells becomes unable to bind to LDL and remove it from the blood stream. However, in its oxidized state, LDL can still contribute to foam cell formation and other atherosclerotic processes. Thus, elevated levels of MPO are a risk factor for atherosclerosis.

=== Medical tests ===
A 2003 study suggested that MPO could serve as a sensitive predictor for myocardial infarction in patients presenting with chest pain. Over 100 studies report the utility of MPO testing. The 2010 Heslop et al. study reported that measuring both MPO and CRP (C-reactive protein; a general and cardiac-related marker of inflammation) provided added benefit for risk prediction than measuring CRP alone.

Immunohistochemical staining for myeloperoxidase used to be administered in the diagnosis of acute myeloid leukemia to demonstrate that the leukemic cells were derived from the myeloid lineage. Myeloperoxidase staining is still important in the diagnosis of myeloid sarcoma, contrasting with the negative staining of lymphomas, which can otherwise have a similar appearance. In the case of screening patients for vasculitis, flow cytometric assays have demonstrated comparable sensitivity to immunofluorescence tests, with the additional benefit of simultaneous detection of multiple autoantibodies relevant to vasculitis. Nonetheless, this method still requires further testing.

=== Inhibitors ===
Azide has been used traditionally as an MPO inhibitor, but 4-aminobenzoic acid hydrazide (4-ABH) is a more specific inhibitor of MPO.

== See also ==
- Chloroma
