= Dityrosine =

Naturally occurring Chemical compound

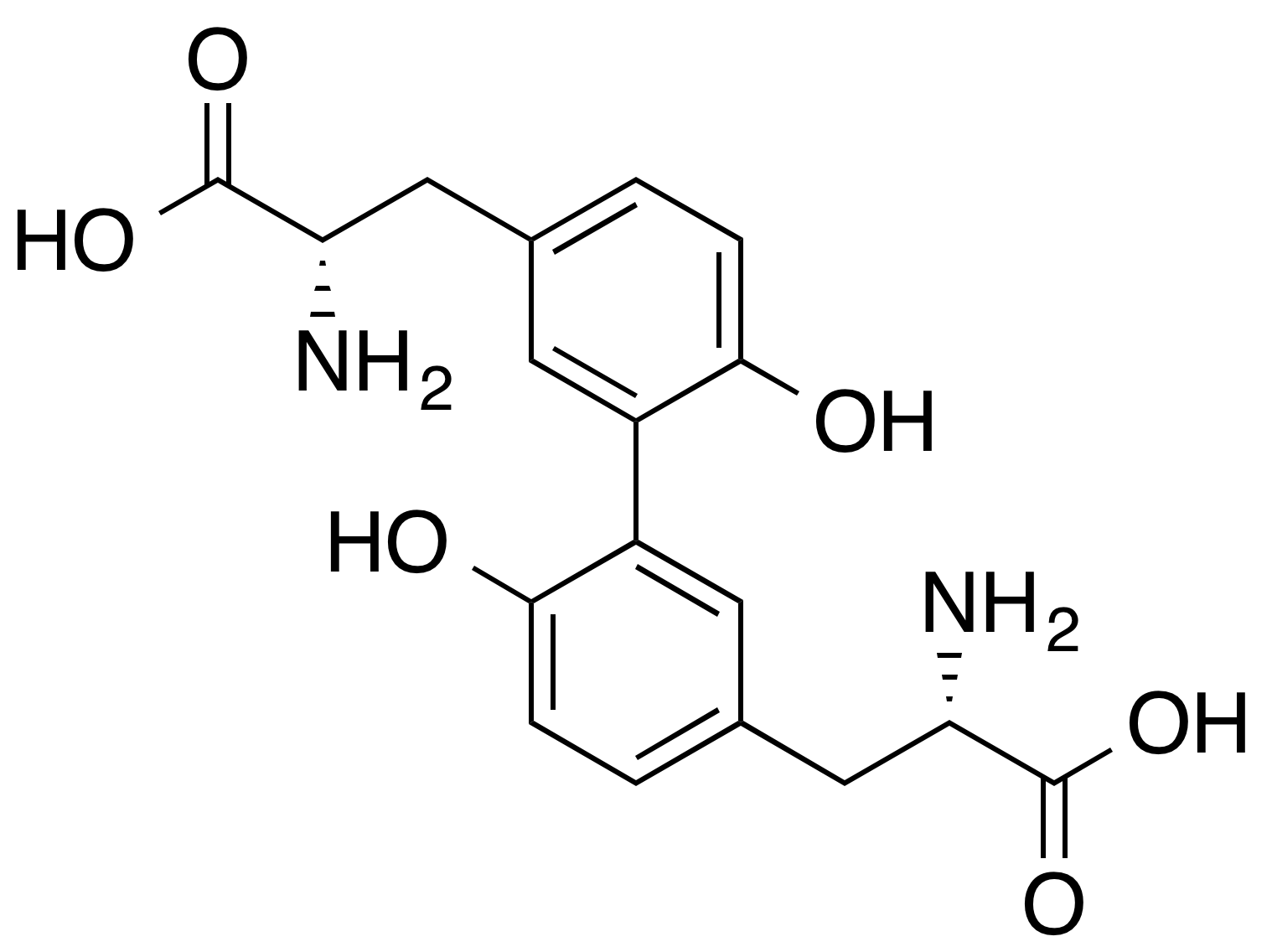

Names
- IUPAC name (2S,2′S)-3,3'-(6,6′-dihydroxybiphenyl-3,3′-diyl)bis(2-aminopropanoic acid)
- Systematic IUPAC name (2S)-2-amino-3-[3-[5-[(2S)-2-amino-2-carboxyethyl]-2-hydroxyphenyl]-4-hydroxyphenyl]propanoic acid
- Other names: L,L-Dityrosine; 3,3′-Di-L-tyrosine; 3,3′-Bityrosine

Identifiers
CAS Number	63442-81-9
3D model (JSmol)	Interactive image
Beilstein Reference	2228674
ChEBI	CHEBI:50609
ChemSpider	97033
PubChem CID	14554235
UNII	CJ9XG8HS20
CompTox Dashboard (EPA)	DTXSID101318376
- InChI: InChI=1S/C18H20N2O6/c19-13(17(23)24)7-9-1-3-15(21)11(5-9)12-6-10(2-4-16(12)22)8-14(20)18(25)26/h1-6,13-14,21-22H,7-8,19-20H2,(H,23,24)(H,25,26)/t13-,14-/m0/s1 Key: OQALFHMKVSJFRR-KBPBESRZSA-N
- SMILES: C1=CC(=C(C=C1C[C@@H](C(=O)O)N)C2=C(C=CC(=C2)C[C@@H](C(=O)O)N)O)O

Properties
Chemical formula	C_{18}H_{20}N_{2}O_{6}
Molar mass	360.366 g·mol^{−1}
- Except where otherwise noted, data are given for materials in their standard state (at 25 °C [77 °F], 100 kPa). Infobox references

Dityrosine is a dimeric form of tyrosine. Whereas tyrosine itself is a proteinogenic amino acid, dityrosine is non-proteinogenic. Various enzymes, such as CYP56A1 and myeloperoxidase, catalyze the oxidation of tyrosine residues in protein chains to form dityrosine crosslinks in various organisms. It was first isolated from rubber protein of locust wing ligament. Its formation can also be induced by various radical-forming agents.

The 2,2′-biphenol structural motif allows dityrosine to form a complex with borate. Affinity chromatography with a column containing immobilised phenylboronic acid has allowed development of several methods for purification of dityrosine.

The tyrosine–tyrosine crosslink can form by ultraviolet irradiation and other conditions that induce radical formation. Proteins with calcium binding sites consisting of two tyrosine residues, such as calmodulin and troponin C, are especially prone to this reaction as a result of coordination of their phenol groups to a calcium ion. The monomer and dimer have different emission wavelengths, which can complicate fluorescence spectroscopic analysis of tyrosine-containing proteins. Conversely, the specific fluorescence of dityrosine allows simple detection of it. In particular, resilin can easily be visualized in whole organisms.

The presence of dityrosine is a general biomarker for oxidative stress.
