= Hypoiodous acid =

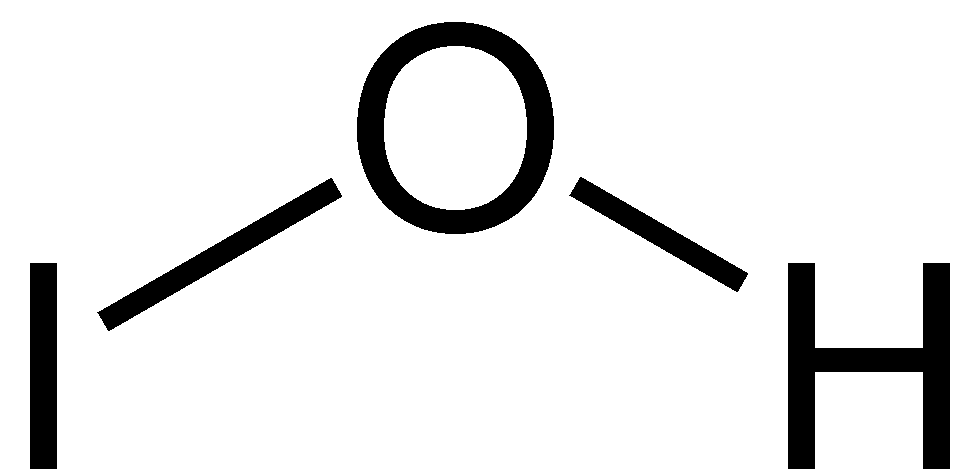

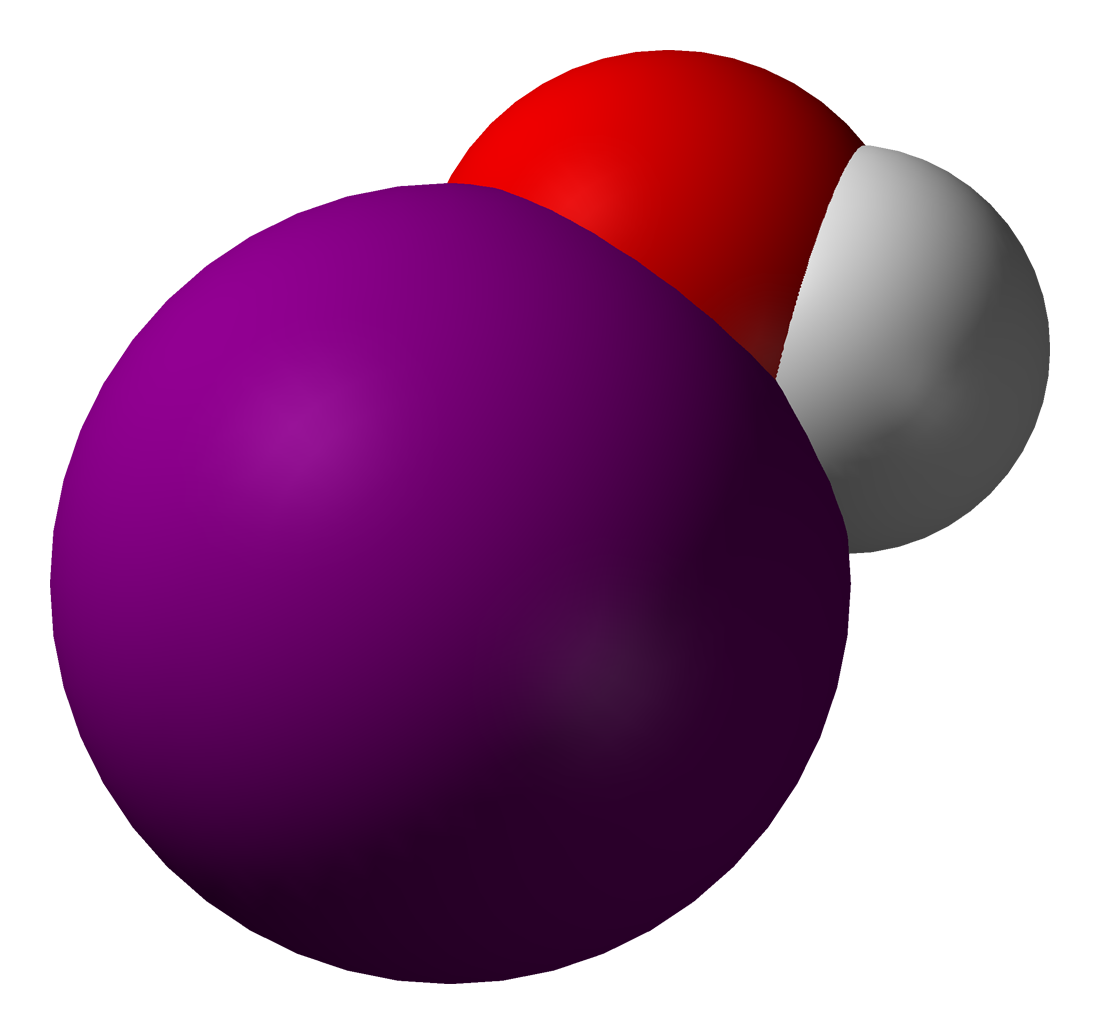
Hydrogen, H
Oxygen, O
Iodine, I
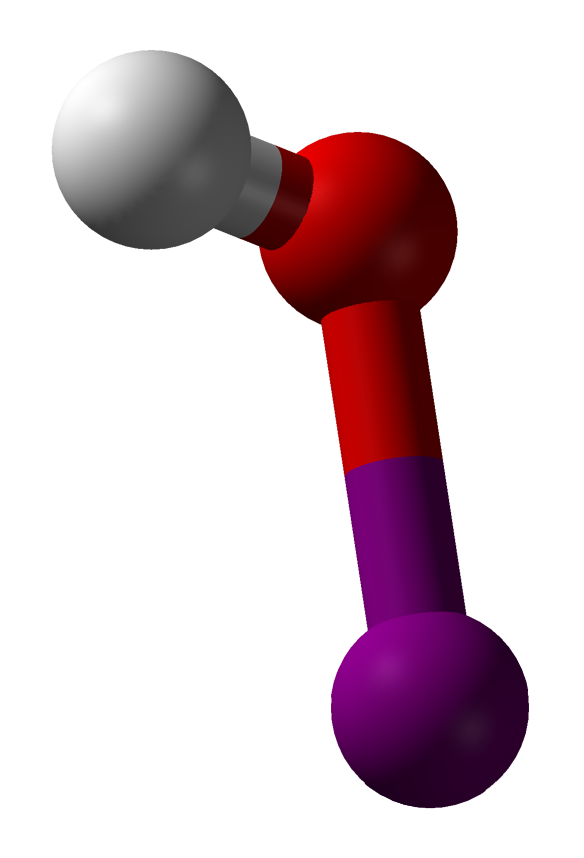

Names
- IUPAC name Hypoiodous acid

Identifiers
CAS Number	14332-21-9
3D model (JSmol)	Interactive image
ChEBI	CHEBI:29231
ChemSpider	109942
PubChem CID	123340
UNII	2PYC923C5W
CompTox Dashboard (EPA)	DTXSID8042050
- InChI: InChI=1S/HIO/c1-2/h2H Key: GEOVEUCEIQCBKH-UHFFFAOYSA-N
- SMILES: IO

Properties
Chemical formula	HOI
Molar mass	143.911 g·mol^{−1}
Acidity (pK_{a})	10.5 (in water, estimate)
Conjugate base	Hypoiodite

Related compounds
Related compounds	Hypofluorous acid; Hypochlorous acid; Hypobromous acid
- Except where otherwise noted, data are given for materials in their standard state (at 25 °C [77 °F], 100 kPa). verify (what is ?) Infobox references

Hypoiodous acid is an inorganic compound with the chemical formula HIO. It forms when an aqueous solution of iodine is treated with mercuric or silver salts. It rapidly decomposes by disproportionation:

5 HIO → HIO_{3} + 2 I_{2} + 2 H_{2}O

Hypoiodous acid is a weak acid with a pK_{a} of about 11. The conjugate base is hypoiodite (IO^{−}). Salts of this anion can be prepared by treating iodine with alkali hydroxides. They rapidly disproportionate to form iodides and iodates, but an iodine–hydroxide mixture can be used an in situ preparation of hypoiodite for other reactions.

Ammonium hypoiodites can be formed by oxidation of the analogous iodide salts. These and also sodium hypoiodite are useful as oxidizing agents for a various types of organic compounds and also for a reaction analogous to the haloform reaction.

Hypoiodite is one of the active oxidizing agents generated by lactoperoxidase as part of the mammalian innate immune system.

== Other oxyacids ==
Hypoiodous acid is part of a series of oxyacids in which iodine can assume oxidation states of −1, +1, +3, +5, or +7. A number of neutral iodine oxides are also known.

Iodine oxidation state	−1	+1	+3	+5	+7
Name	Hydrogen iodide	Hypoiodous acid	Iodous acid	Iodic acid	Periodic acid
Formula	HI	HIO	HIO_{2}	HIO_{3}	HIO_{4} or H_{5}IO_{6}
