= ERG4 =

Protein-coding gene in the species Saccharomyces cerevisiae S288c

Delta(24(24(1)))-sterol reductase

Identifiers
- Organism: Saccharomyces cerevisiae S288c
- Symbol: ERG4
- Alt. symbols: YGL022
- Entrez: 852872
- HomoloGene: 5946
- RefSeq (mRNA): NM_001180877.1
- RefSeq (Prot): NP_011503.1
- UniProt: P25340

Other data
- EC number: 1.3.1.71
- Chromosome: VII: 0.47 - 0.47 Mb
Search for
- Structures: Swiss-model
- Domains: InterPro

ERG4 or Delta(24(24(1)))-sterol reductase or Delta(24(28))-sterol reductase is an enzyme that catalyzes the last step of ergosterol biosynthesis pathway in fungi Saccharomyces cerevisiae (Baker's yeast), which 5,7,22,24(28)-ergostatetraenol converted into ergosterol.
