= Hypobromous acid =

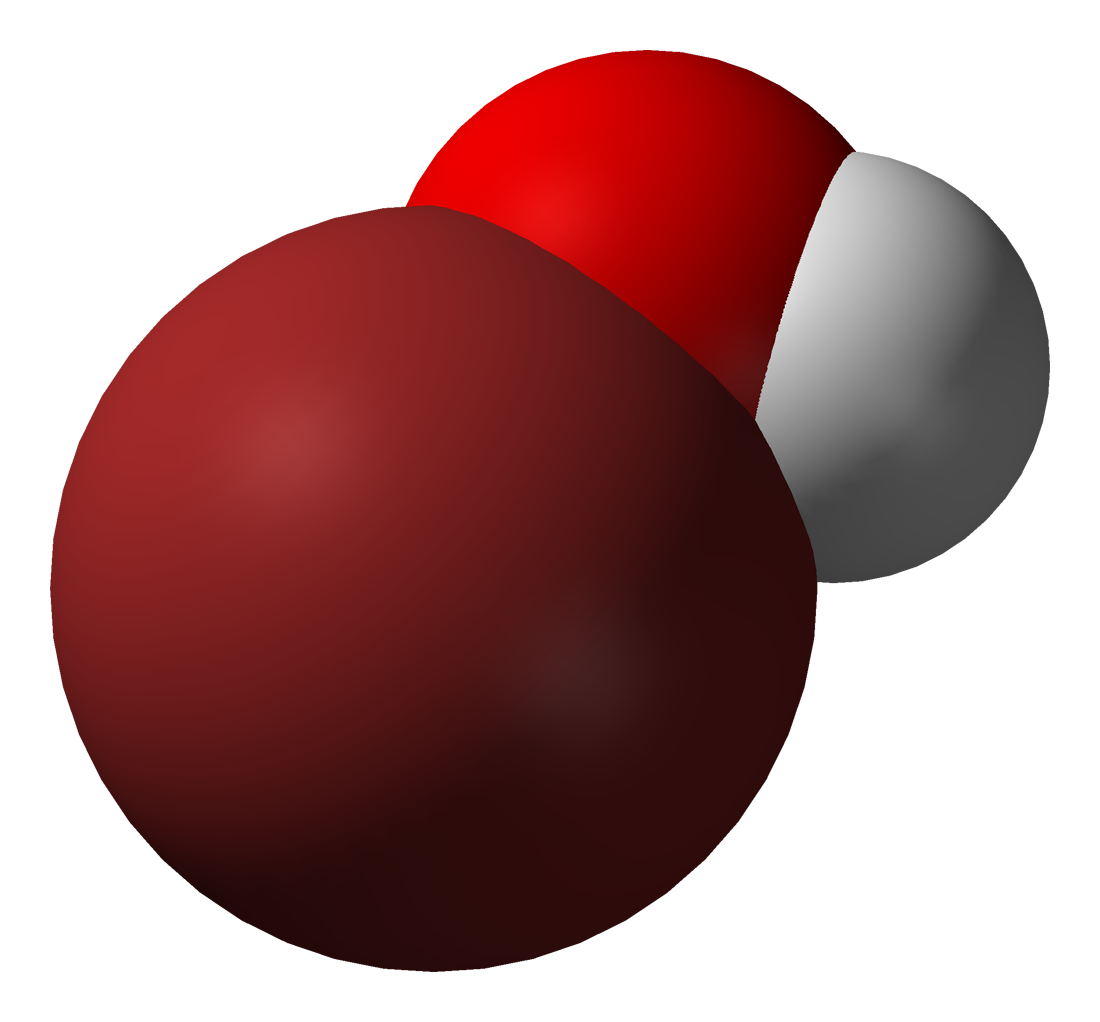
- Space-filling model of hypobromous acid Hydrogen, H Oxygen, O Bromine, Br

Names
- IUPAC name Hypobromous acid
- Other names: Bromanol; Bromic(I) acid; Bromooxidane; Hydroxidobromine

Identifiers
CAS Number	13517-11-8
3D model (JSmol)	Interactive image
ChEBI	CHEBI:29249
ChemSpider	75379
ECHA InfoCard	100.119.006
PubChem CID	83547
UNII	GHT9BV419J
CompTox Dashboard (EPA)	DTXSID701024864
- InChI: InChI=1S/BrHO/c1-2/h2H Key: CUILPNURFADTPE-UHFFFAOYSA-N; InChI=1S/BrHO/c1-2/h2H Key: CUILPNURFADTPE-UHFFFAOYSA-N; InChI=1/BrHO/c1-2/h2H Key: CUILPNURFADTPE-UHFFFAOYAL
- SMILES: OBr

Properties
Chemical formula	HOBr
Molar mass	96.911 g·mol^{−1}
Density	2.470 g/cm^{3}
Boiling point	20–25 °C (68–77 °F; 293–298 K)
Acidity (pK_{a})	8.65
Conjugate base	Hypobromite

Related compounds
Other cations	Sodium hypobromite
Related compounds	Hypofluorous acid; Hypochlorous acid; Hypoiodous acid; Hypobromite
- Except where otherwise noted, data are given for materials in their standard state (at 25 °C [77 °F], 100 kPa). verify (what is ?) Infobox references

Hypobromous acid is an inorganic compound with chemical formula of HOBr. It is a weak, unstable acid. It is mainly produced and handled in an aqueous solution. It is generated both biologically and commercially as a disinfectant. Salts of hypobromite are rarely isolated as solids.

== Synthesis and properties ==
Addition of bromine to water gives hypobromous acid and hydrobromic acid (HBr(aq)) via a disproportionation reaction.

Br_{2} + H_{2}O $\ce{<=>>}$ HOBr + HBr

In nature, hypobromous acid is produced by bromoperoxidases, which are enzymes that catalyze the oxidation of bromide with hydrogen peroxide:

Br^{−} + H_{2}O_{2} $\ce{<=>>}$ HOBr + OH^{−}

Hypobromous acid has a pK_{a} of 8.65 and is therefore only partially dissociated in water at pH 7. Like the acid, hypobromite salts are unstable and undergo a slow disproportionation reaction to yield the respective bromate and bromide salts.

3 BrO^{−}(aq) → 2 Br^{−}(aq) + BrO^{−}_{3}(aq)

Its chemical and physical properties are similar to those of other hypohalites.

== Uses ==
HOBr is used as a bleach, an oxidizer, a deodorant, and a disinfectant, due to its ability to kill the cells of many pathogens. The compound is generated in warm-blooded vertebrate organisms especially by eosinophils, which produce it by the action of eosinophil peroxidase, an enzyme which preferentially uses bromide. Bromide is also used in hot tubs and spas as a germicidal agent, using the action of an oxidizing agent to generate hypobromite in a similar fashion to the peroxidase in eosinophils. It is especially effective when used in combination with its congener, hypochlorous acid.
