= Sodium hypobromite =

Names
- IUPAC name Sodium hypobromite

Identifiers
CAS Number	13824-96-9
3D model (JSmol)	Interactive image
ChemSpider	146053
ECHA InfoCard	100.034.096
EC Number	237-520-4
PubChem CID	23673712
UNII	ZU61C4V8RA
CompTox Dashboard (EPA)	DTXSID40930039
- InChI: InChI=1S/BrO.Na/c1-2;/q-1;+1 Key: CRWJEUDFKNYSBX-UHFFFAOYSA-N
- SMILES: [O-]Br.[Na+]

Properties
Chemical formula	NaBrO
Molar mass	118.893 g·mol^{−1}
Appearance	orange solid

Related compounds
Other anions	Sodium bromide; Sodium bromite; Sodium bromate; Sodium perbromate
Related compounds	Hypobromous acid
- Except where otherwise noted, data are given for materials in their standard state (at 25 °C [77 °F], 100 kPa). Infobox references

Sodium hypobromite is an inorganic compound with the chemical formula NaBrO. It is a sodium salt of hypobromous acid. It consists of sodium cations Na^{+} and hypobromite anions ^{−}OBr. It is usually obtained as the pentahydrate, so the compound that is usually called sodium hypobromite actually has the formula NaOBr·5H_{2}O. It is a yellow-orange solid that is soluble in water. It adopts a monoclinic crystal structure with a Br–O bond length of 1.820 Å. It is the bromine analogue of sodium hypochlorite, the active ingredient in common bleach. In practice the salt is usually encountered as an aqueous solution.

Sodium hypobromite arises by treatment of aqueous solution of bromine with sodium hydroxide:

Br_{2} + 2 NaOH → NaBr + NaOBr + H_{2}O

It can be prepared in situ for use as a reagent, such as in the synthesis of 3-aminopyridine from nicotinamide (via the Hofmann rearrangement).

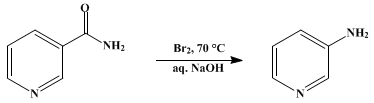

Sodium hypobromite solutions must be prepared fresh since the compound slowly disproportionates to sodium bromide and sodium bromate:

3 NaOBr → 2 NaBr + NaBrO_{3}
