= Bromide peroxidase =

Family of enzymes

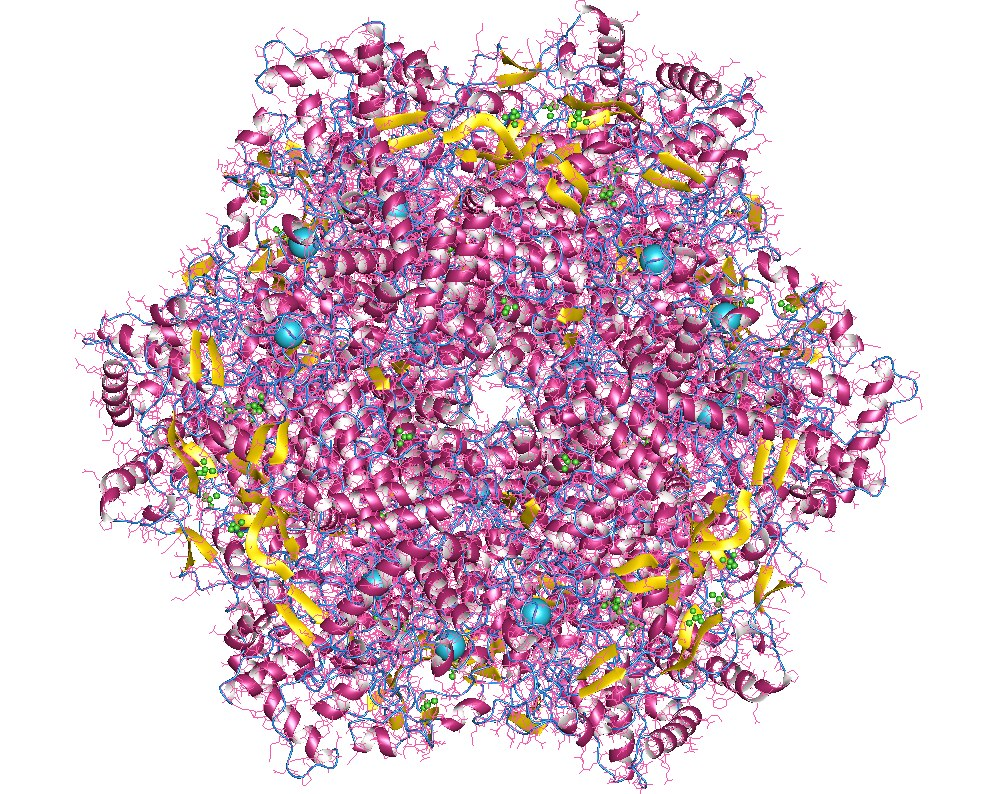
- Bromoperoxidase dodekamer from Corallina pilulifera, an example of a vanadium bromoperoxidase (PDB: 1UP8)

Identifiers
- EC no.: 1.11.1.18

Databases
- IntEnz: IntEnz view
- BRENDA: BRENDA entry
- ExPASy: NiceZyme view
- KEGG: KEGG entry
- MetaCyc: metabolic pathway
- PRIAM: profile
- PDB structures: RCSB PDB PDBe PDBsum
Search
- PMC: articles
- PubMed: articles
- NCBI: proteins

Bromide peroxidase (EC 1.11.1.18, bromoperoxidase, haloperoxidase (ambiguous), eosinophil peroxidase) is a family of enzymes with systematic name bromide:hydrogen-peroxide oxidoreductase. These enzymes catalyse the following chemical reaction:

HBr + H_{2}O_{2} $\rightleftharpoons$ HOBr + H_{2}O

The HOBr is a potent brominating agent. The many organobromine compounds observed in marine environments are the products of reaction with this oxidized form of bromine.

Bromo peroxidases of red and brown marine algae (Rhodophyta and Phaeophyta) contain vanadate (vanadium bromoperoxidase). Otherwise vanadium is unusual cofactor in biology. By virtue of this family of enzymes, a variety of brominated natural products have been isolated from marine sources.

Related chloroperoxidase enzymes effect chlorination. In the nomenclature of haloperoxidase, bromoperoxidases classically are unable to oxidize chloride at all. For example, eosinophil peroxidase appears to prefer bromide over chloride, yet is not considered a bromoperoxidase because it is able to use chloride.

Muricidae (was Murex) spp. snails have a bromoperoxidase used to produce Tyrian purple dye. The enzyme is very specific to bromide and physically stable, but has not been characterized as to its active site metal. As of 2019, no specific gene has been assigned to such an enzyme in the snail genome. Such an activity is probably provided by symbiotic Bacillus bacteria instead. The identified enzyme belongs to the alpha/beta hydrolase superfamily; a structure for a similar bromoperoxidase is available as PDB: 3FOB. It runs on a catalytic triad of Ser 99, Asp 229 and His 258 and does not require metal cofactors.

== Additional reading ==
- De Boer, E.; Tromp, M.G.M.; Plat, H.; Krenn, G.E.; Wever, R (1986). "Vanadium(v) as an essential element for haloperoxidase activity in marine brown-algae - purification and characterization of a vanadium(V)-containing bromoperoxidase from Laminaria saccharina". Biochim. Biophys. Acta. 872 (1–2): 104–115. doi:10.1016/0167-4838(86)90153-6.
- Tromp MG, Olafsson G, Krenn BE, Wever R (September 1990). "Some structural aspects of vanadium bromoperoxidase from Ascophyllum nodosum". Biochimica et Biophysica Acta (BBA) - Protein Structure and Molecular Enzymology. 1040 (2): 192–8. doi:10.1016/0167-4838(90)90075-q. PMID 2400770.
- Isupov MN, Dalby AR, Brindley AA, Izumi Y, Tanabe T, Murshudov GN, Littlechild JA (June 2000). "Crystal structure of dodecameric vanadium-dependent bromoperoxidase from the red algae Corallina officinalis". Journal of Molecular Biology. 299 (4): 1035–49. doi:10.1006/jmbi.2000.3806. PMID 10843856.
- Carter-Franklin JN, Butler A (November 2004). "Vanadium bromoperoxidase-catalyzed biosynthesis of halogenated marine natural products". Journal of the American Chemical Society. 126 (46): 15060–6. Bibcode:2004JAChS.12615060C. doi:10.1021/ja047925p. PMID 15548002.
- Ohshiro T, Littlechild J, Garcia-Rodriguez E, Isupov MN, Iida Y, Kobayashi T, Izumi Y (June 2004). "Modification of halogen specificity of a vanadium-dependent bromoperoxidase". Protein Science. 13 (6): 1566–71. doi:10.1110/ps.03496004. PMC 2279980. PMID 15133166.
