= Chloride peroxidase =

Family of enzymes

Identifiers
- EC no.: 1.11.1.10
- CAS no.: 9055-20-3

Databases
- IntEnz: IntEnz view
- BRENDA: BRENDA entry
- ExPASy: NiceZyme view
- KEGG: KEGG entry
- MetaCyc: metabolic pathway
- PRIAM: profile
- PDB structures: RCSB PDB PDBe PDBsum
Search
- PMC: articles
- PubMed: articles
- NCBI: proteins

Chloride peroxidase (EC 1.11.1.10) is a family of enzymes that catalyzes the chlorination of organic compounds. This enzyme combines the inorganic substrates chloride and hydrogen peroxide to produce the equivalent of Cl^{+}, which replaces a proton in hydrocarbon substrate:

R-H + Cl^{−} + H_{2}O_{2} + H^{+} → R-Cl + 2 H_{2}O

In fact the source of "Cl^{+}" is hypochlorous acid (HOCl). Many organochlorine compounds are biosynthesized in this way.

This enzyme belongs to the family of oxidoreductases, specifically those acting on a peroxide as acceptors (peroxidases). The systematic name of this enzyme class is chloride:hydrogen-peroxide oxidoreductase. This enzyme is also called chloroperoxidase. It employs one cofactor which may be either heme or vanadium.

The heme-containing chloroperoxidase (CPO) exhibits peroxidase, catalase and cytochrome P450-like activities in addition to catalyzing halogenation reactions. Despite functional similarities with other heme enzymes, the structure of CPO is unique, which folds into a tertiary structure dominated by eight helical segments. The catalytic acid base, required to cleave the peroxide O-O bond, is glutamic acid rather than histidine as in horseradish peroxidase.

== Structural studies ==
As of late 2007, 30 structures have been solved for this class of enzymes, with PDB accession codes 1A7U, 1A88, 1A8Q, 1A8S, 1A8U, 1BRT, 1CPO, 1IDQ, 1IDU, 1QHB, 1QI9, 1VNC, 1VNE, 1VNF, 1VNG, 1VNH, 1VNI, 1VNS, 2CIV, 2CIW, 2CIX, 2CIY, 2CIZ, 2CJ0, 2CJ1, 2CJ2, 2CPO, 2J18, 2J19, and 2J5M.
