= ERG11 =

Sterol 14-demethylase

Identifiers
- Organism: Saccharomyces cerevisiae
- Symbol: ERG11
- Alt. symbols: CYP51F1
- Entrez: 856398
- Orthologs: NCBI: entry; OMA: entry
- RefSeq (mRNA): NM_001179137
- RefSeq (Prot): NP_011871
- UniProt: P10614

Other data
- EC number: 1.14.14.154
- Chromosome: VIII: 0.12 - 0.12 Mb
Search for
- Structures: Swiss-model
- Domains: InterPro

ERG11 or sterol 14-demethylase is a fungal cytochrome P450 enzyme originally from Saccharomyces cerevisiae, belongs to family CYP51, with the CYP Symbol CYP51F1. ERG11 catalyzes the C14-demethylation of lanosterol to 4,4'-dimethyl cholesta-8,14,24-triene-3-beta-ol which is the first step of biosynthesis of the zymosterol, zymosterol will be further converted into ergosterol.
