= Resilium =

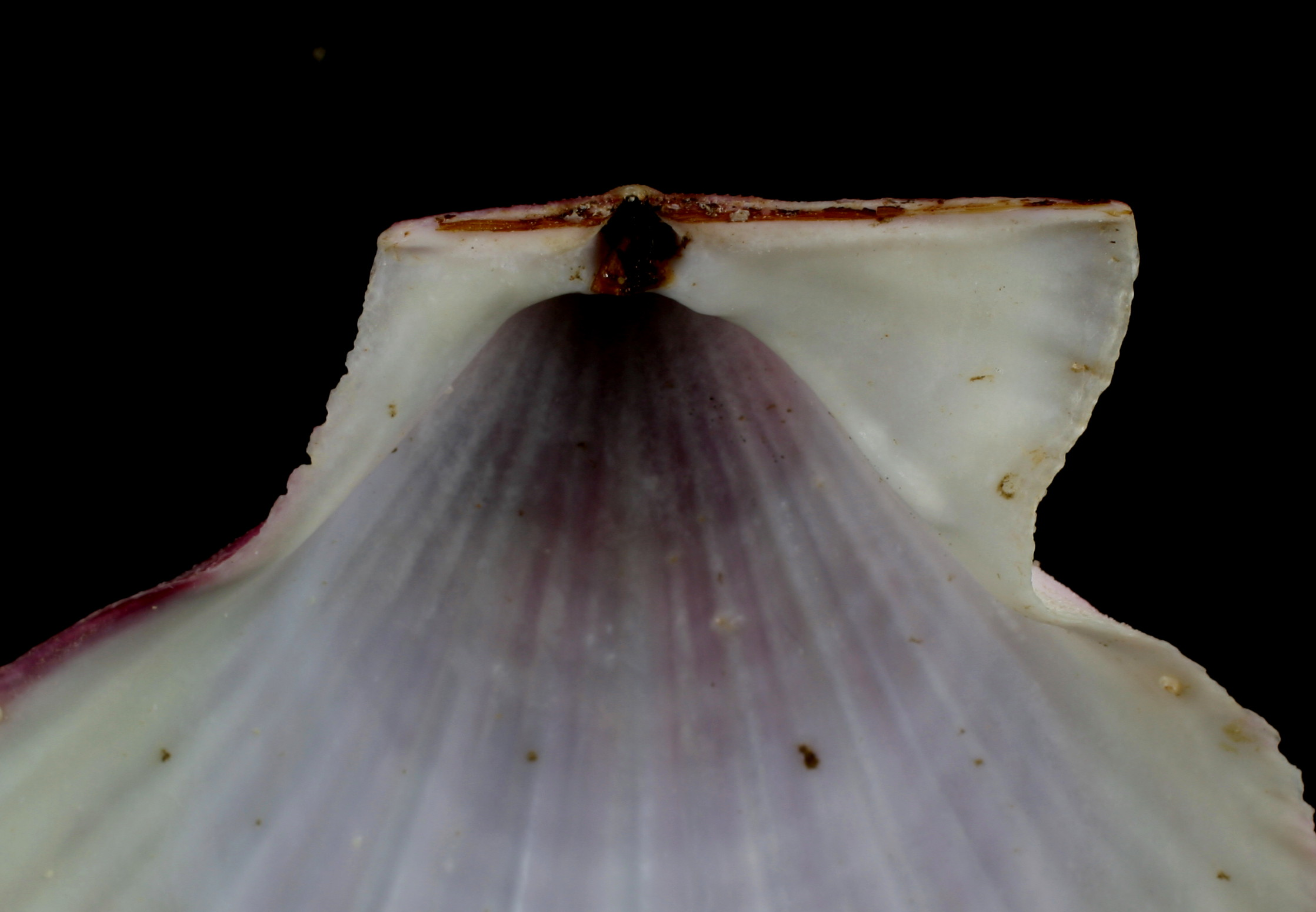
The hinge area in one valve of a scallop shell (Pectinidae), showing the space for the internal ligament, known as the resilifer

In anatomy, a resilium is part of the shell of certain bivalve mollusks. It is an internal ligament, which holds the two valves together and is located in a pit or depression known as the resilifer.

The resilium is part of the hinge mechanism in certain taxonomic families of bivalve shells, such as oysters and scallops. A resilium (and the resilifer, its associated contact point) is the primary structure comprising the type of bivalve hinge that is known as an "disodont" hinge.
