= Hinge teeth =

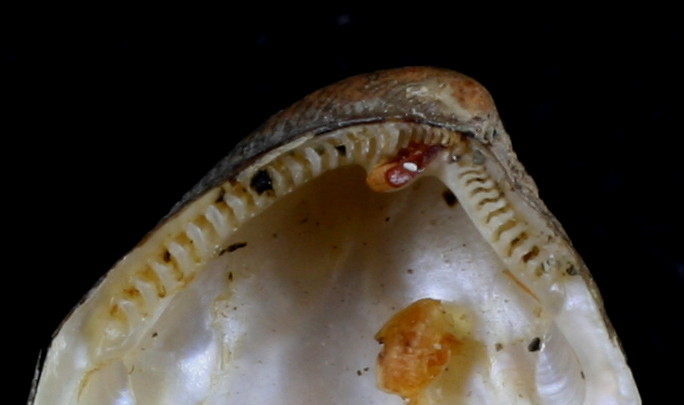
A close-up photograph of the hinge teeth of a nut clam

Hinge teeth are part of the anatomical structure of the inner surface of a bivalve shell, i.e., the shell of a bivalve mollusk. Bivalves by definition have two valves, which are joined together by a strong and flexible ligament situated on the hinge line at the dorsal edge of the shell. In life, the shell needs to be able to open slightly to allow the foot and siphons to protrude, and then close again, without the valves moving out of alignment with one another. To make this possible, in most cases, the two valves are articulated using an arrangement of structures known as hinge teeth (often referred to collectively as the "dentition"). Like the ligament, the hinge teeth are also situated along the hinge line of the shell, in most cases.

In most families of bivalves, the two valves of the shell are almost perfectly symmetrical with one another along the hinge line, although the placement and shape of the teeth may differ slightly in the left valve and right valve in order for the two valves to articulate properly.

Each related group of bivalves tends to have distinctive hinge teeth, and because of this, examining the arrangement of the hinge teeth in a bivalve shell is often essential for identification and classification.

A formal terminology is used to describe the different types of dentition.

== In taxonomy ==
The hinge teeth, or the lack thereof, are an important feature in identifying bivalves because the teeth are generally similar within the major taxonomic groups. Historically, the hinge teeth have provided a convenient means by which to construct classification schemes and attempt to indicate the phylogenetic relationships within the class Bivalvia. There are formal names for the various types of hinge tooth arrangements or dentition.

== Kinds of hinge teeth ==
=== Taxodont ===
The taxodont hinge shows either one or two rows of similar interlocking teeth on either side of the umbones, as is the case in the ark clams (Arcidae), the bittersweets (Glycymerididae), and the nut clams (Nuculidae).

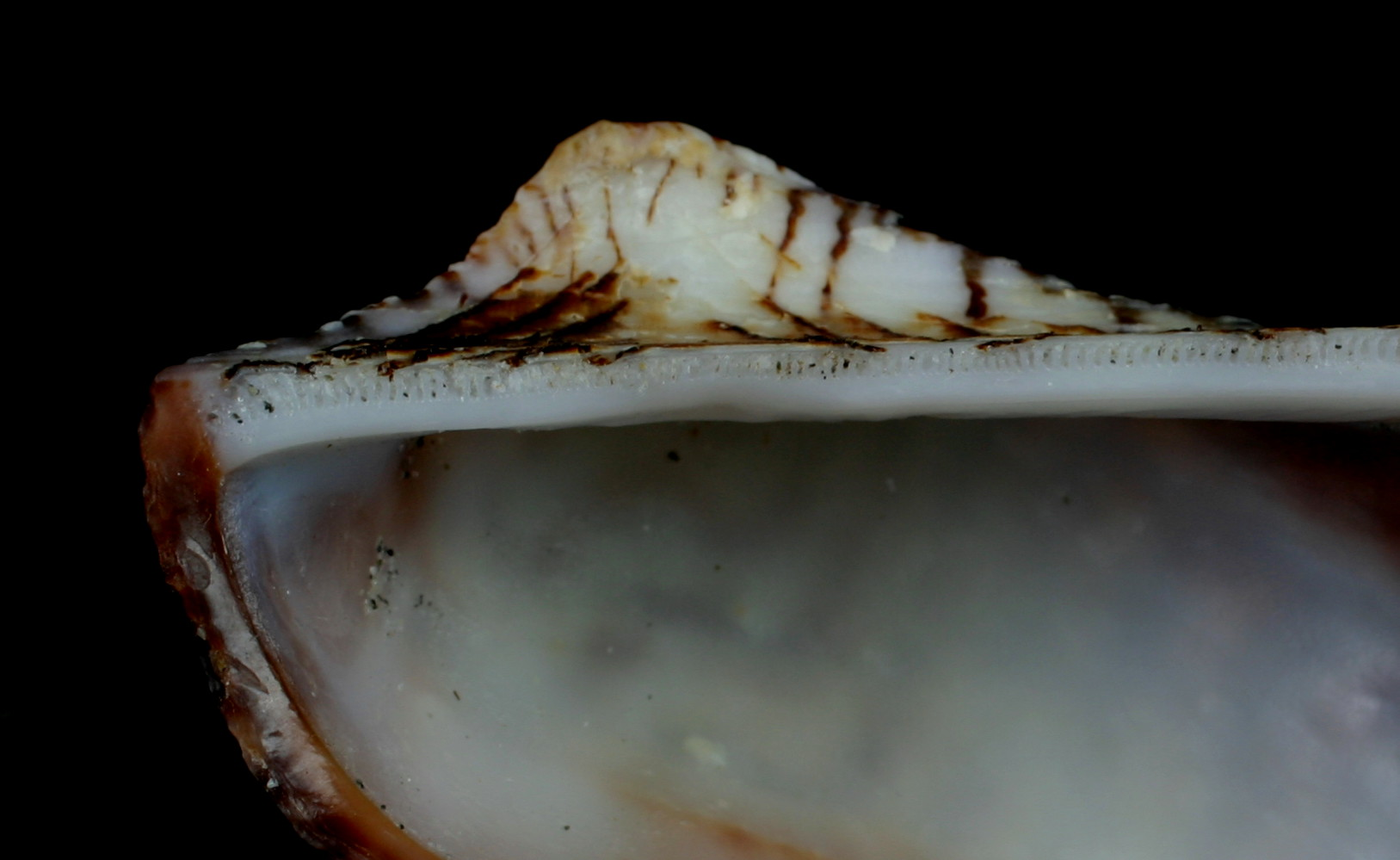
Arcidae hinge

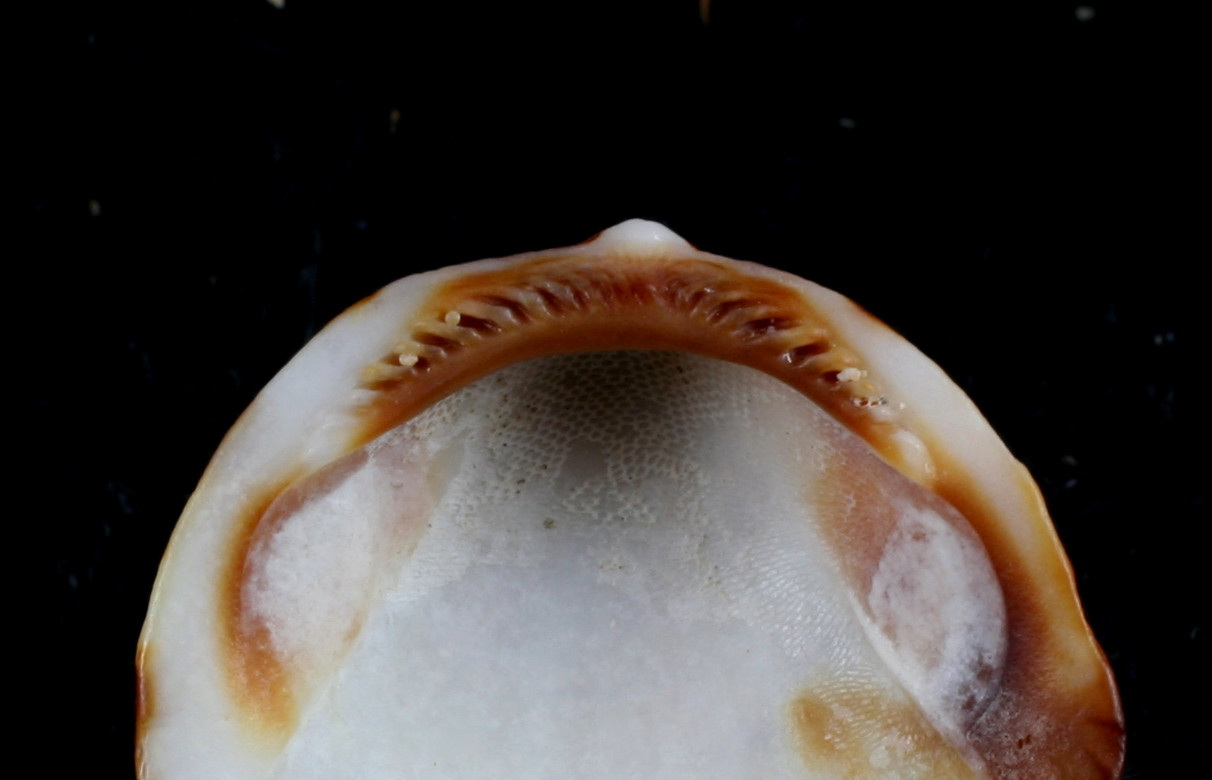
Glycymerididae hinge

=== Dysodont ===
The dysodont hinge shows a strong ligament along the hinge line, with weak teeth near the umbones, as in the marine mussels (Mytilidae).

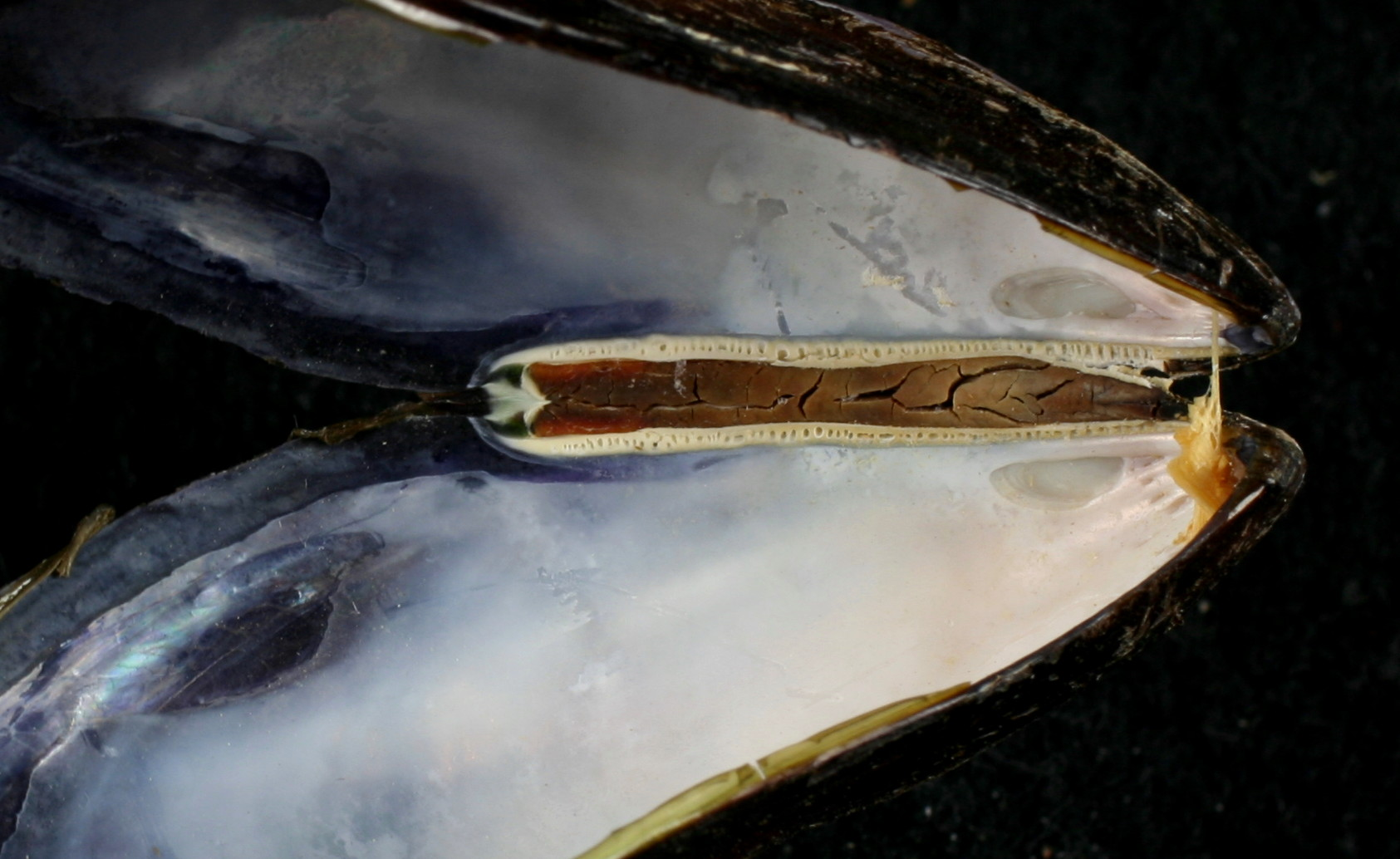
Mytilidae hinge

=== Isodont ===
The isodont hinge has lateral tubercles and sockets on either side of a thick ligament, which is referred to as a resilium. This arrangement is typical of the oysters (Ostreidae), scallops (Pectinidae), thorny oysters (Spondylidae), and kittens paws (Plicatulidae).

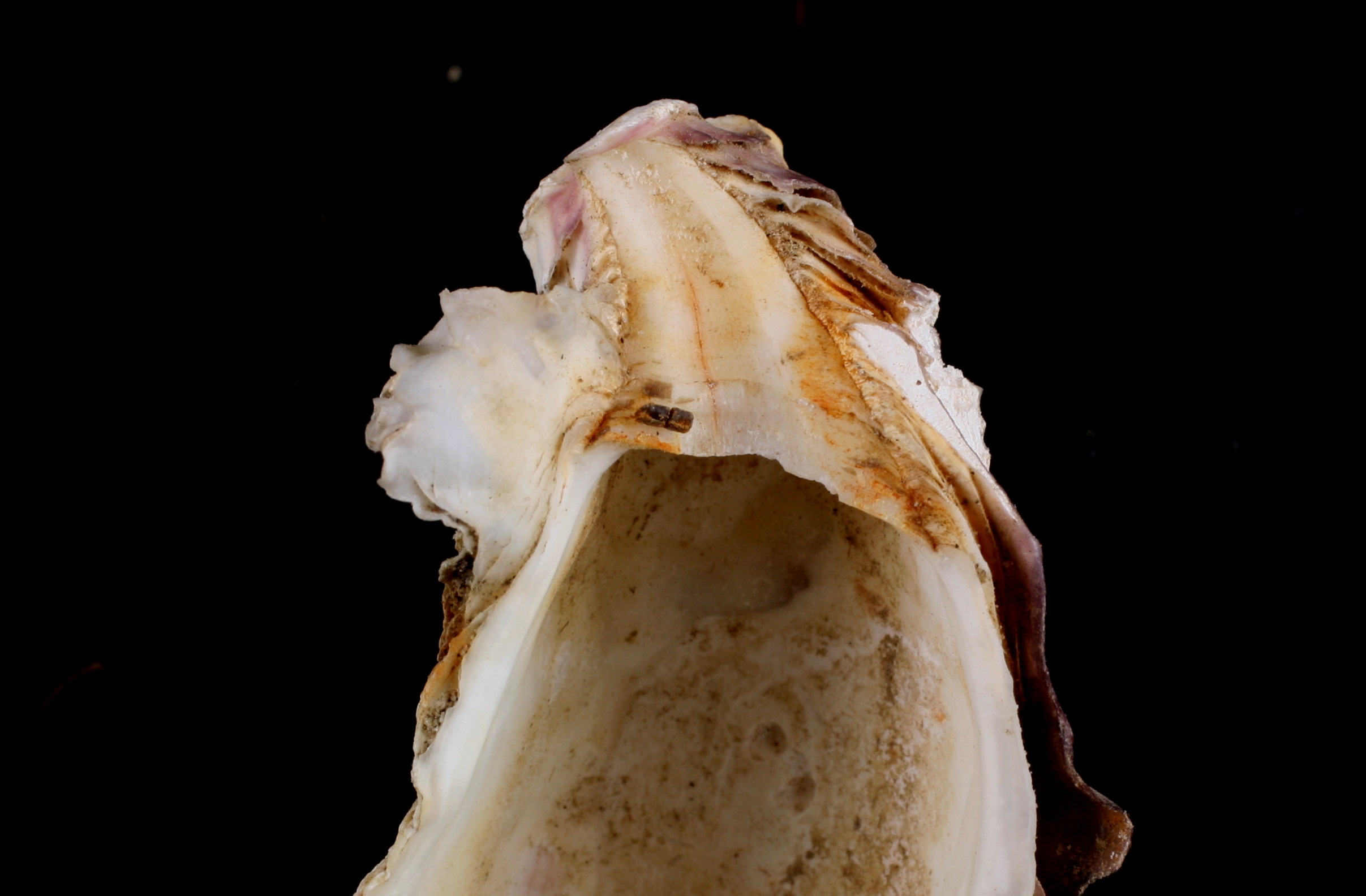
Ostreidae hinge

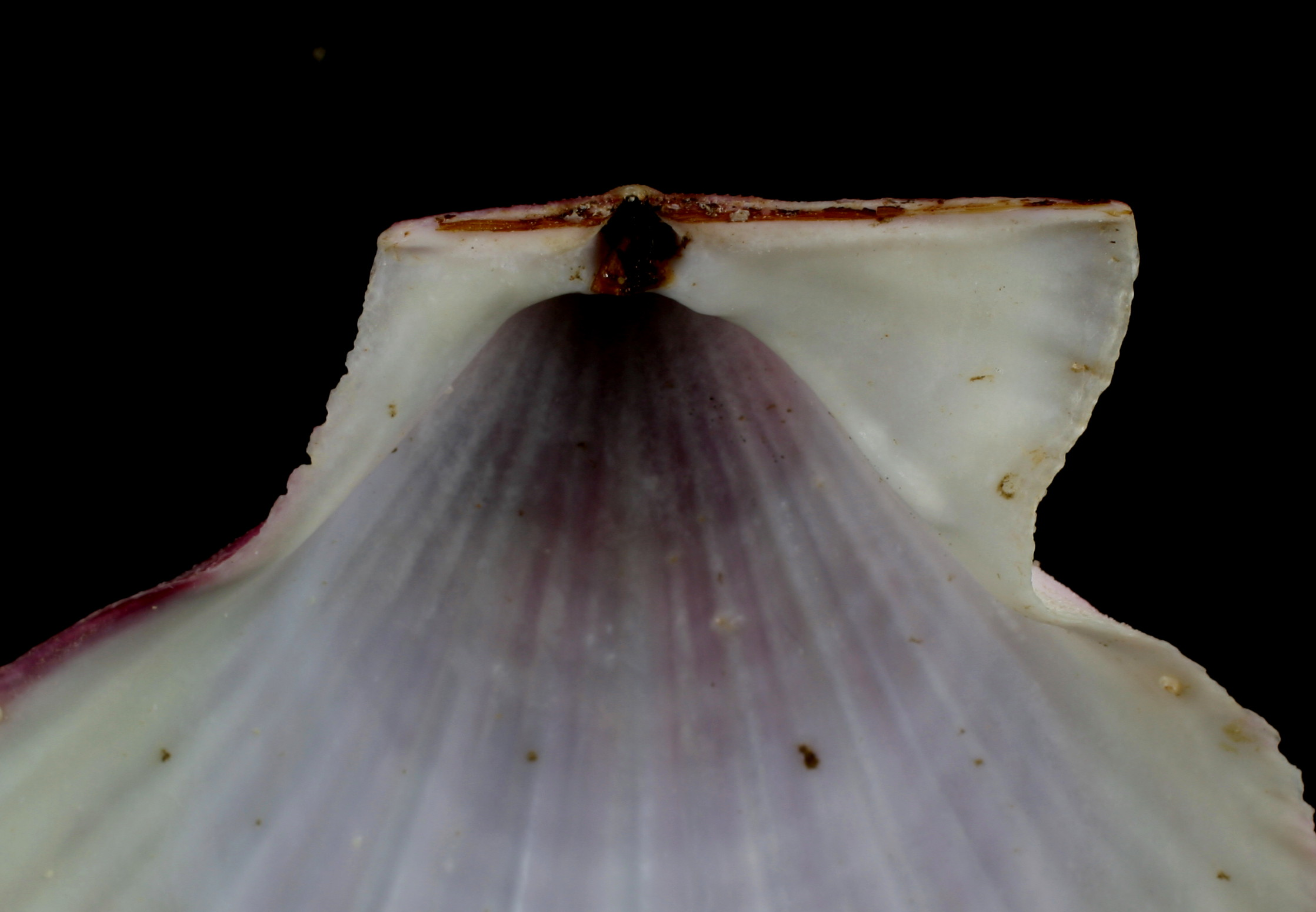
Pectinidae hinge

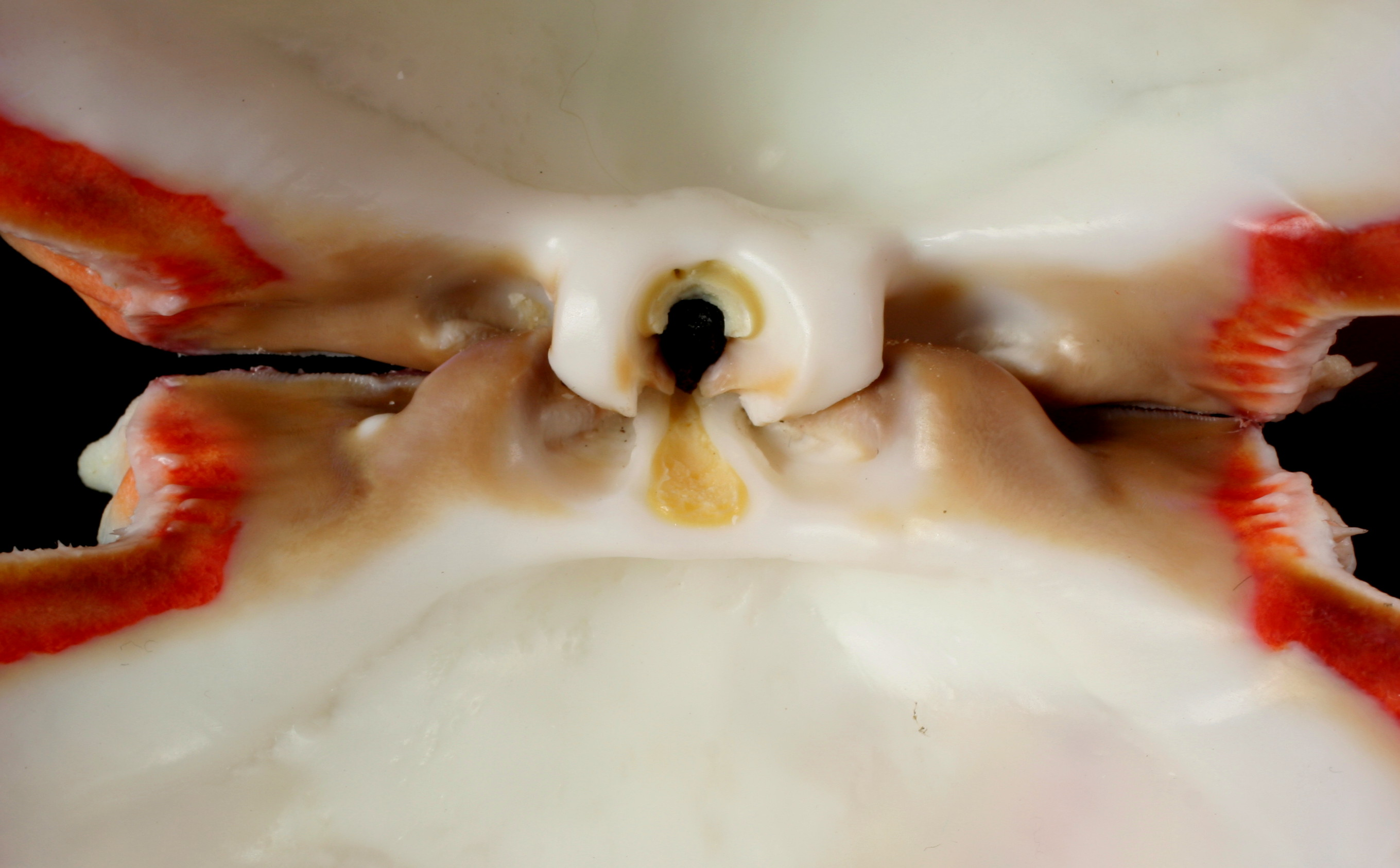
Spondylidae hinge

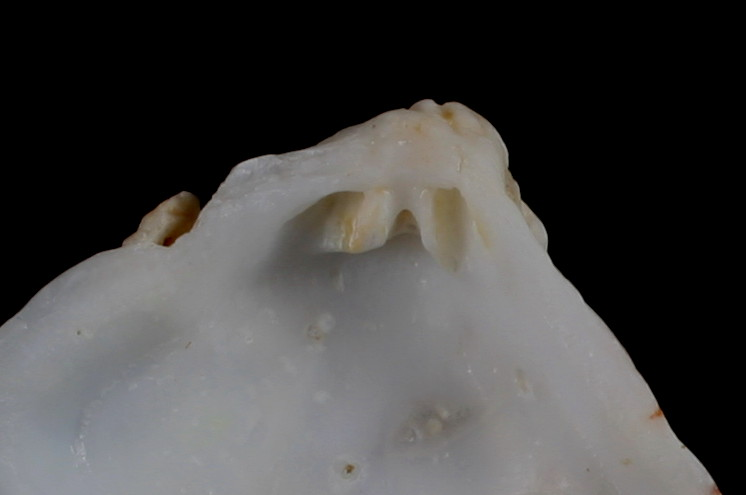
Plicatulidae hinge

=== Crurae ===
The crurae hinge has lamellar ridges on or near the hinge plate, and these function as hinge teeth. This arrangement is characteristic of the Pandoridae, the jingle shells Anomiidae, and Dimyidae.

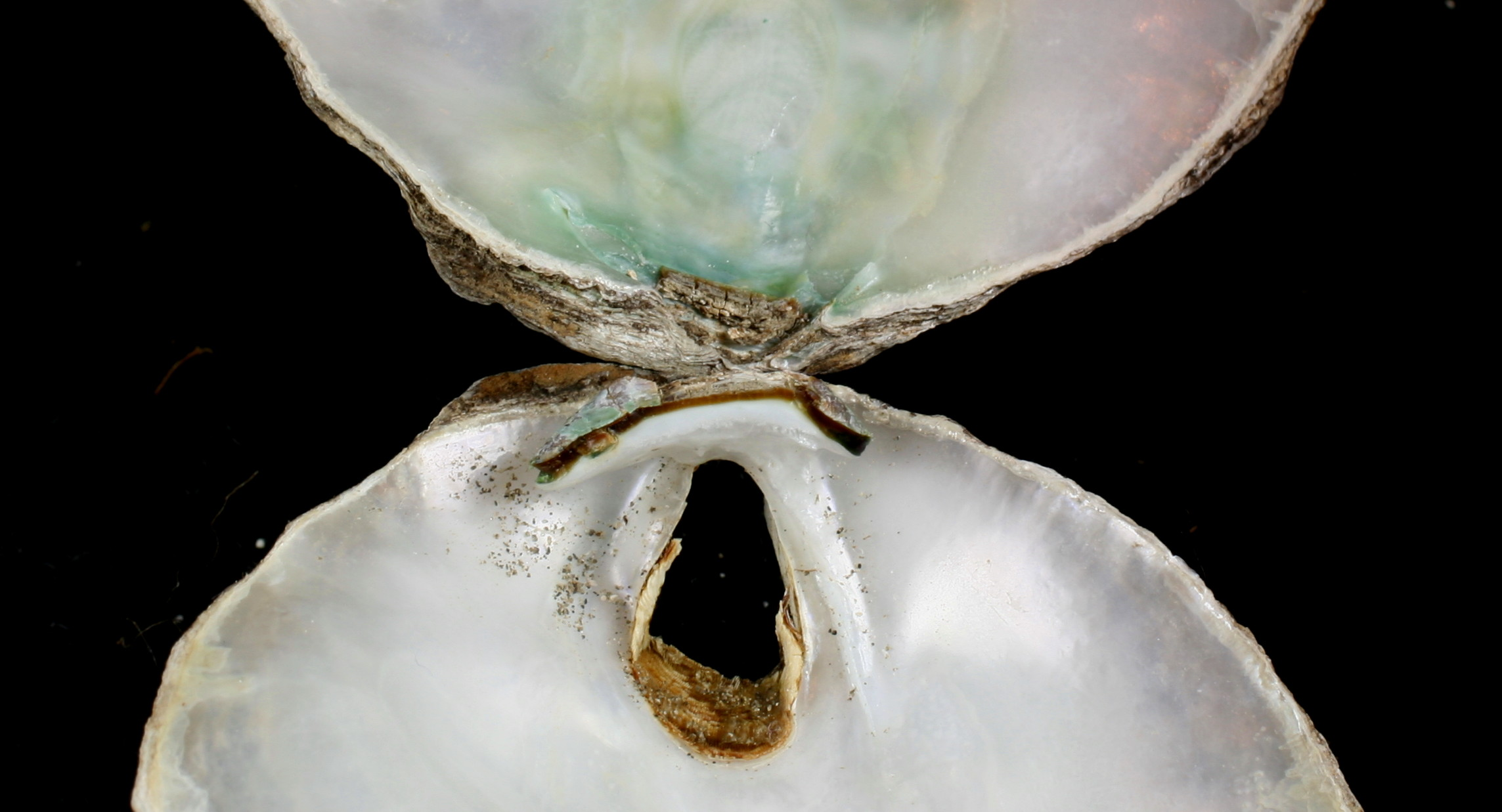
Anomiidae hinge

=== Schizodont ===
The schizodont hinge has reverse V-shaped scissurate teeth, and often an elongated lateral tooth. This arrangement is found in most Unionidae freshwater mussels.

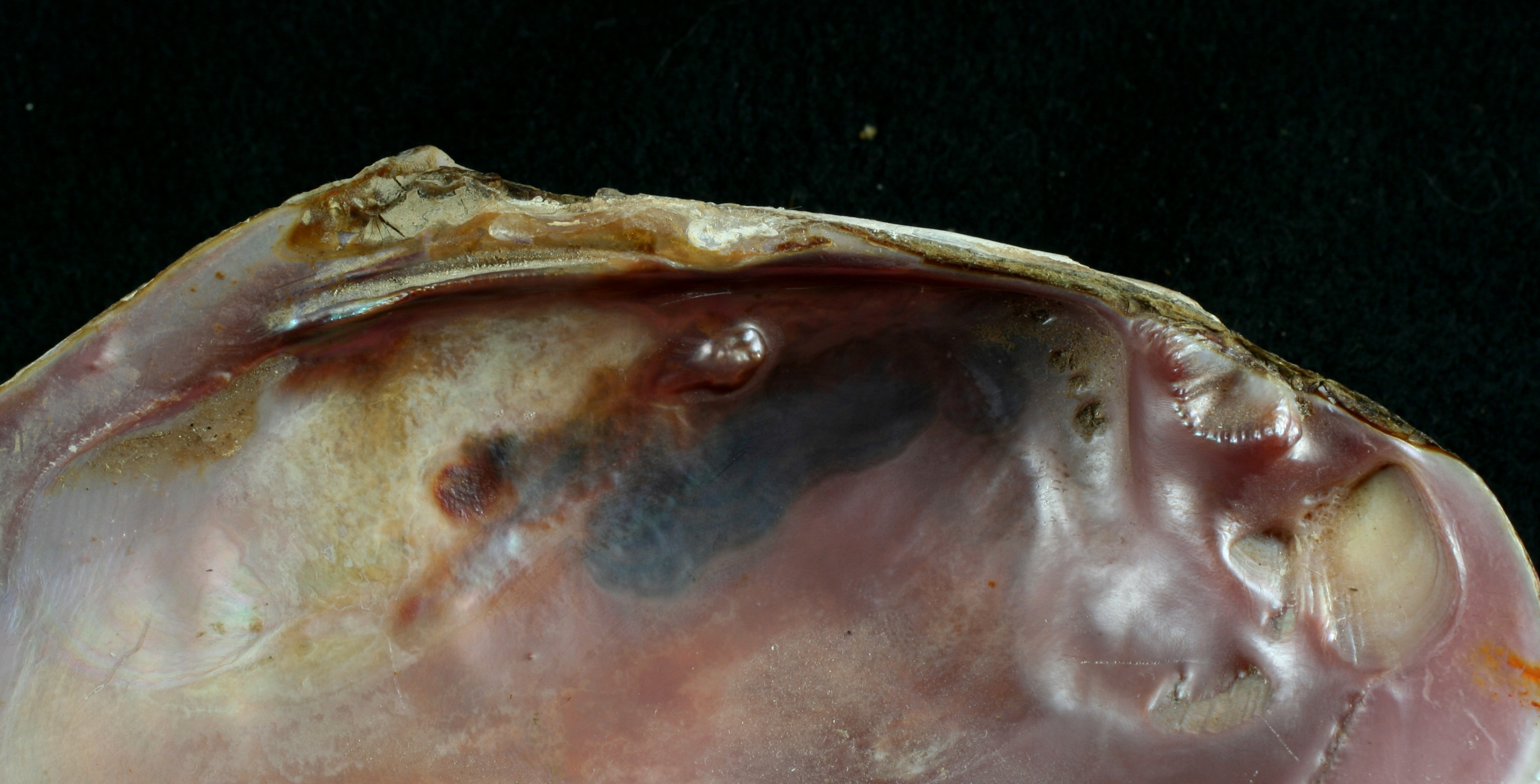
Unionidae hinge

=== Pachyodont ===
The pachyodont hinge has large, obscure tubercules with corresponding pits on the opposite valve. This arrangement is characteristic of the Chamidae, the jewel boxes.

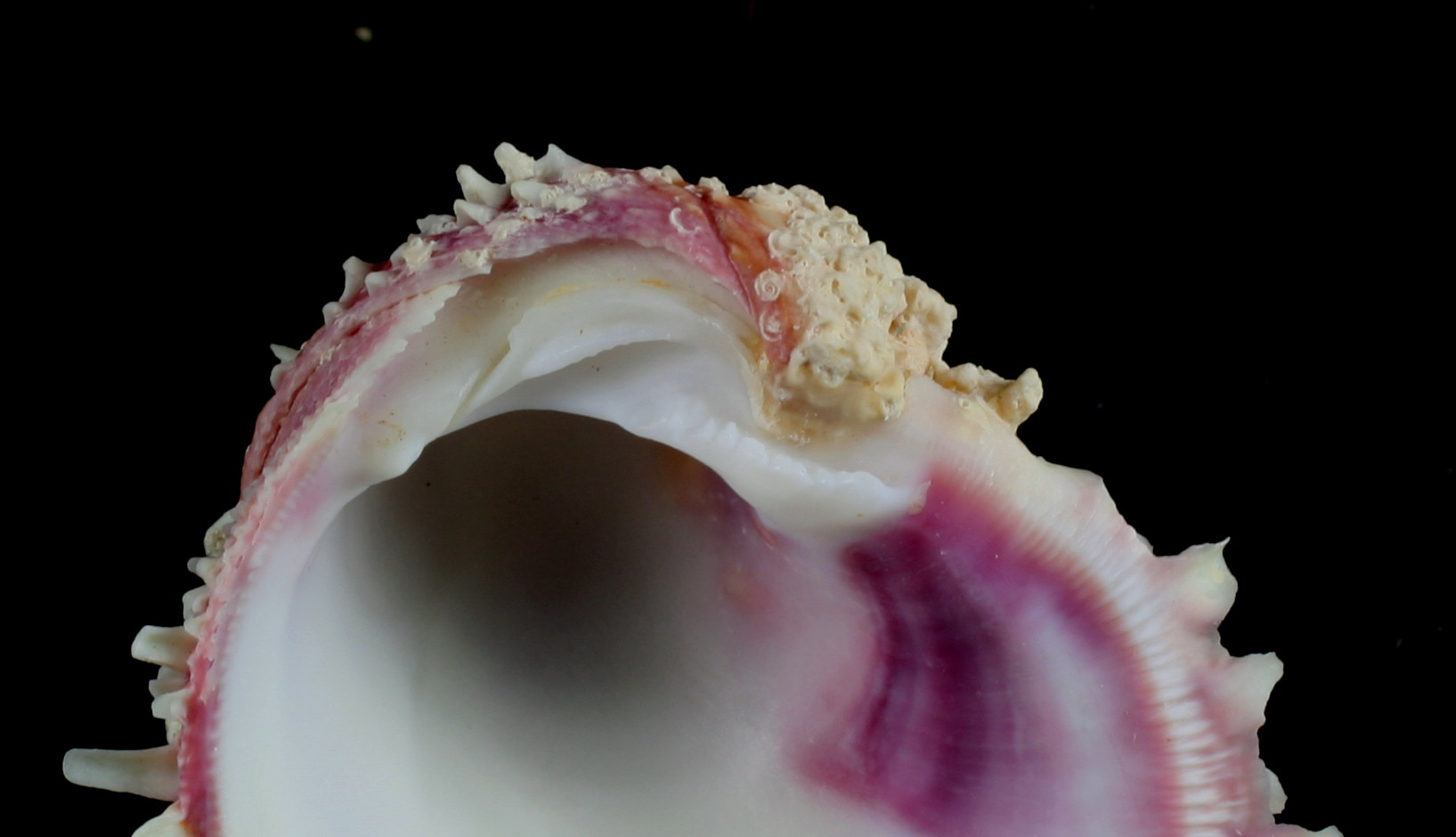
Chamidae hinge

=== Heterodont ===
The heterodont hinge has two to three wedge-shaped cardinal teeth set in the center near the umbones, and generally also has elongated lateral teeth on the anterior and posterior margins (on one or both sides). This arrangement is characteristic of the venus clams (Veneridae), the cockles (Cardiidae) and several other important groups.

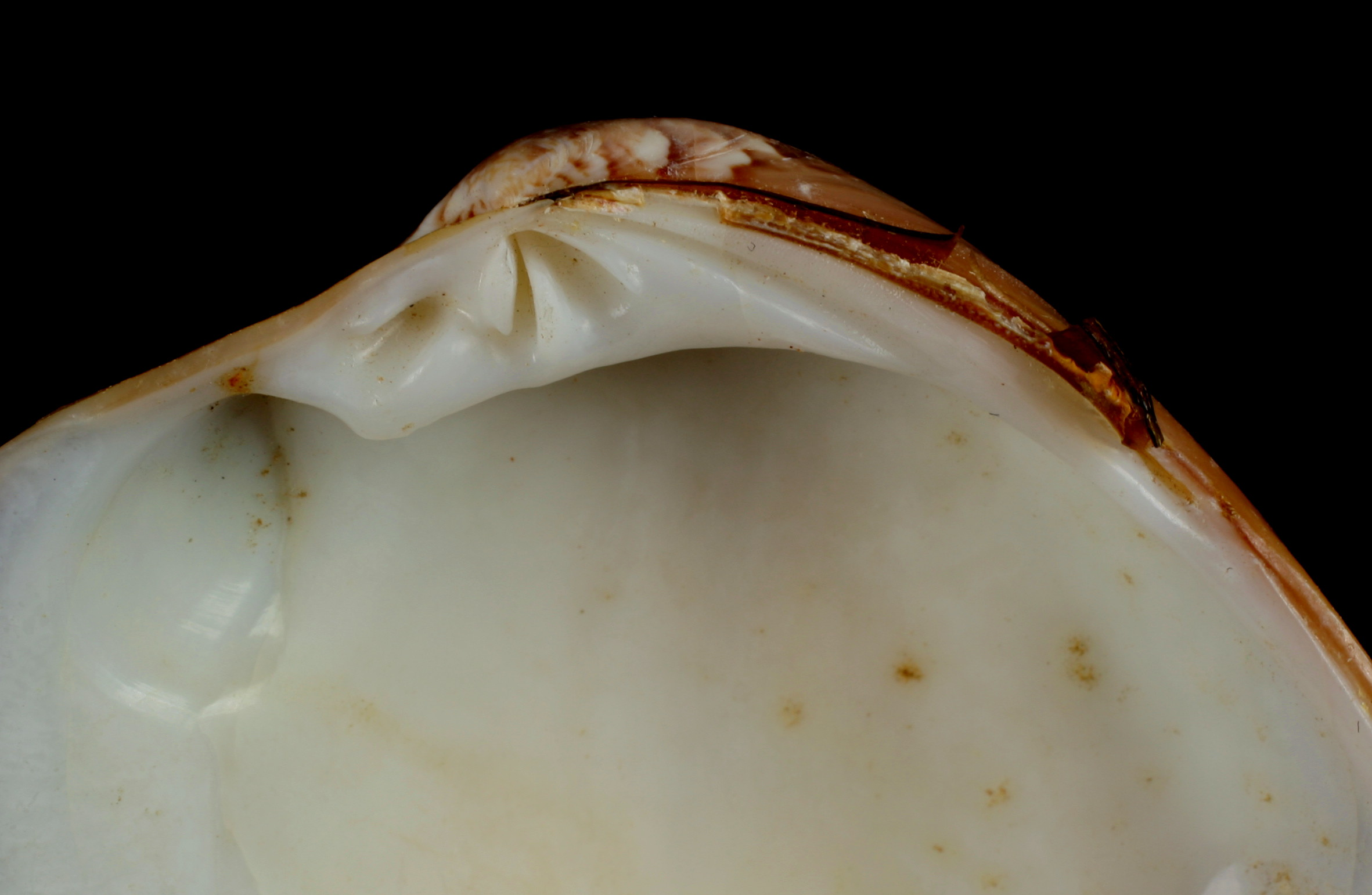
Veneridae: Pitar hinge

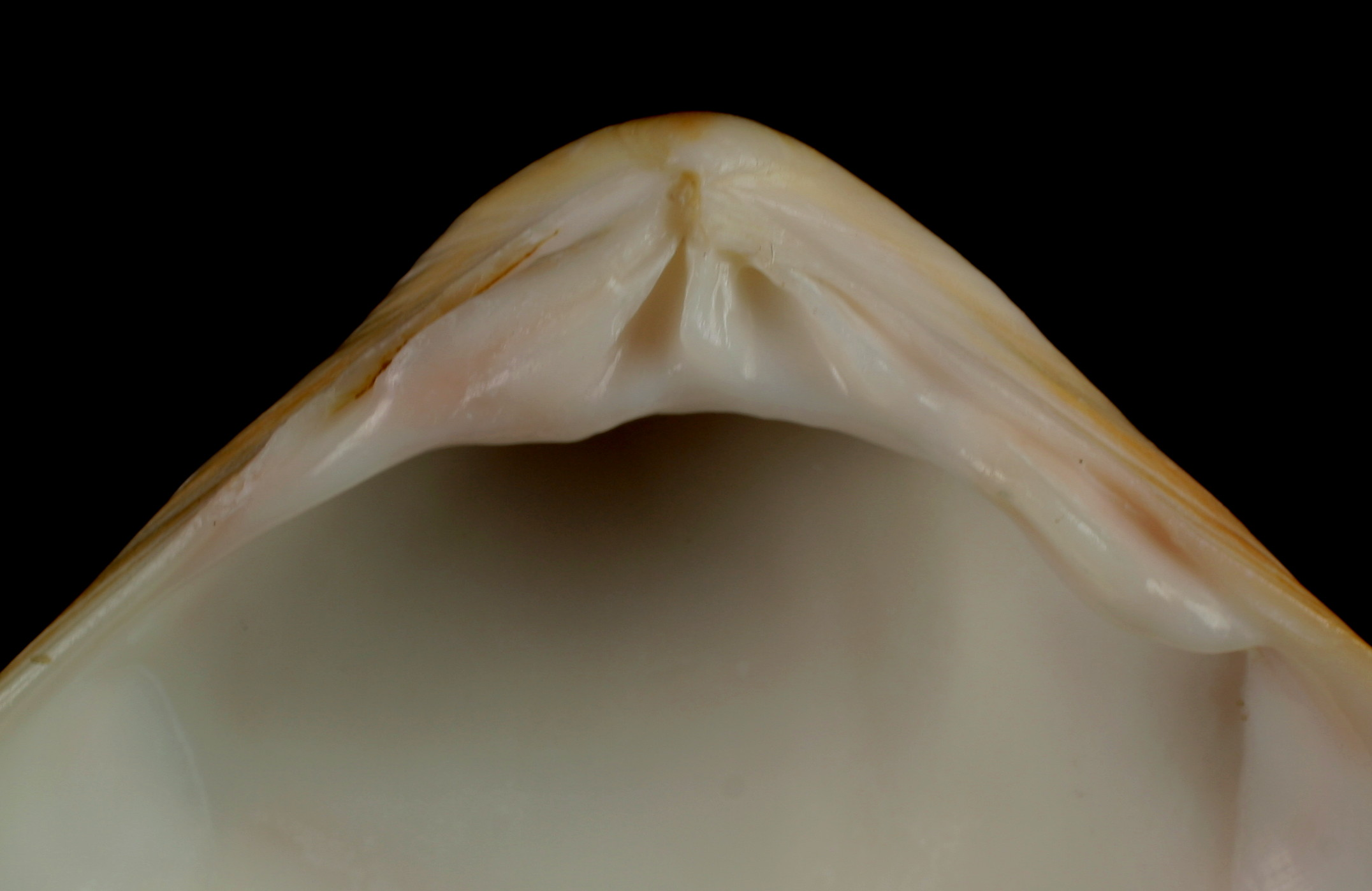
Veneridae: Tivela hinge

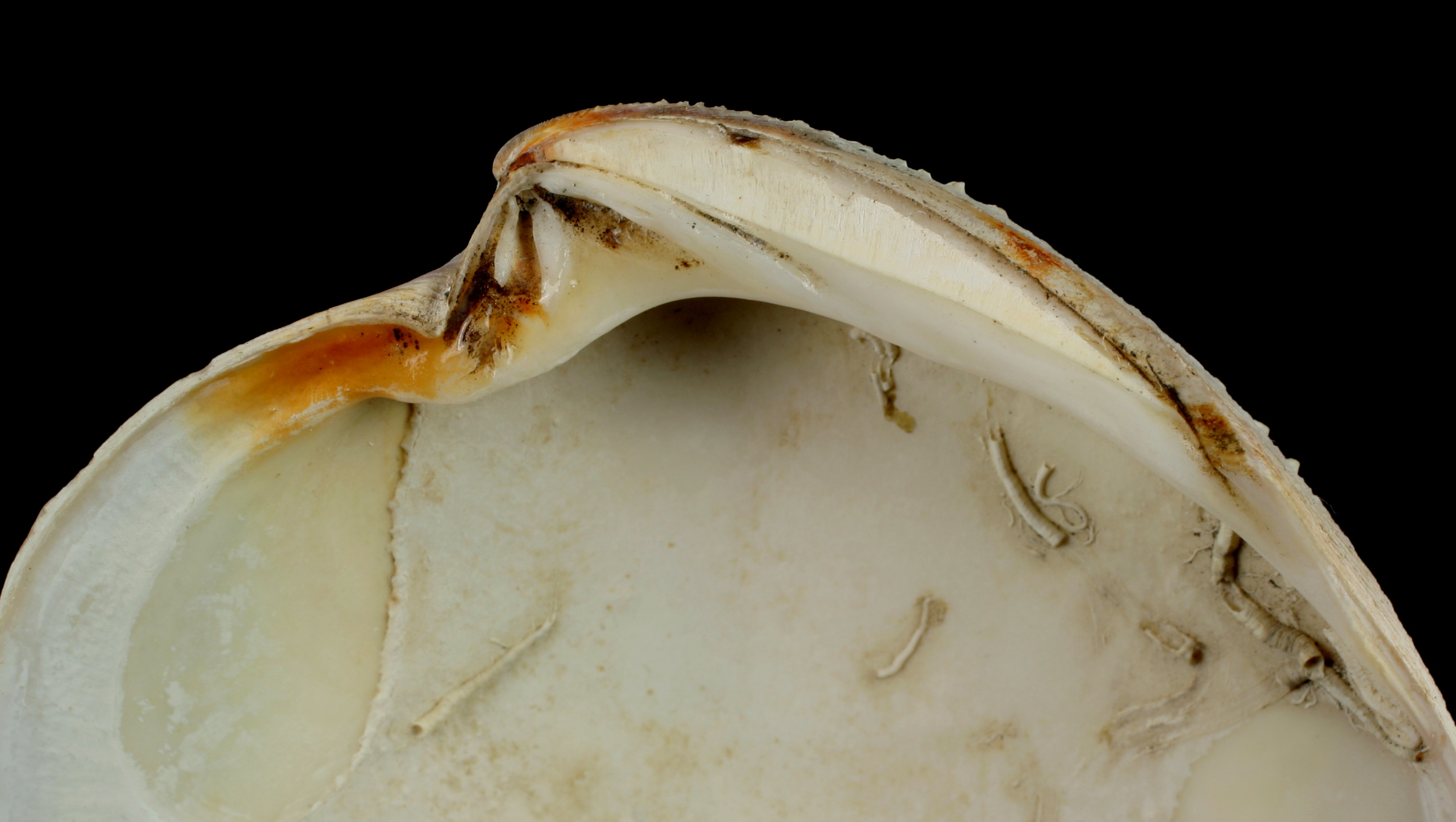
Veneridae: Dosina hinge

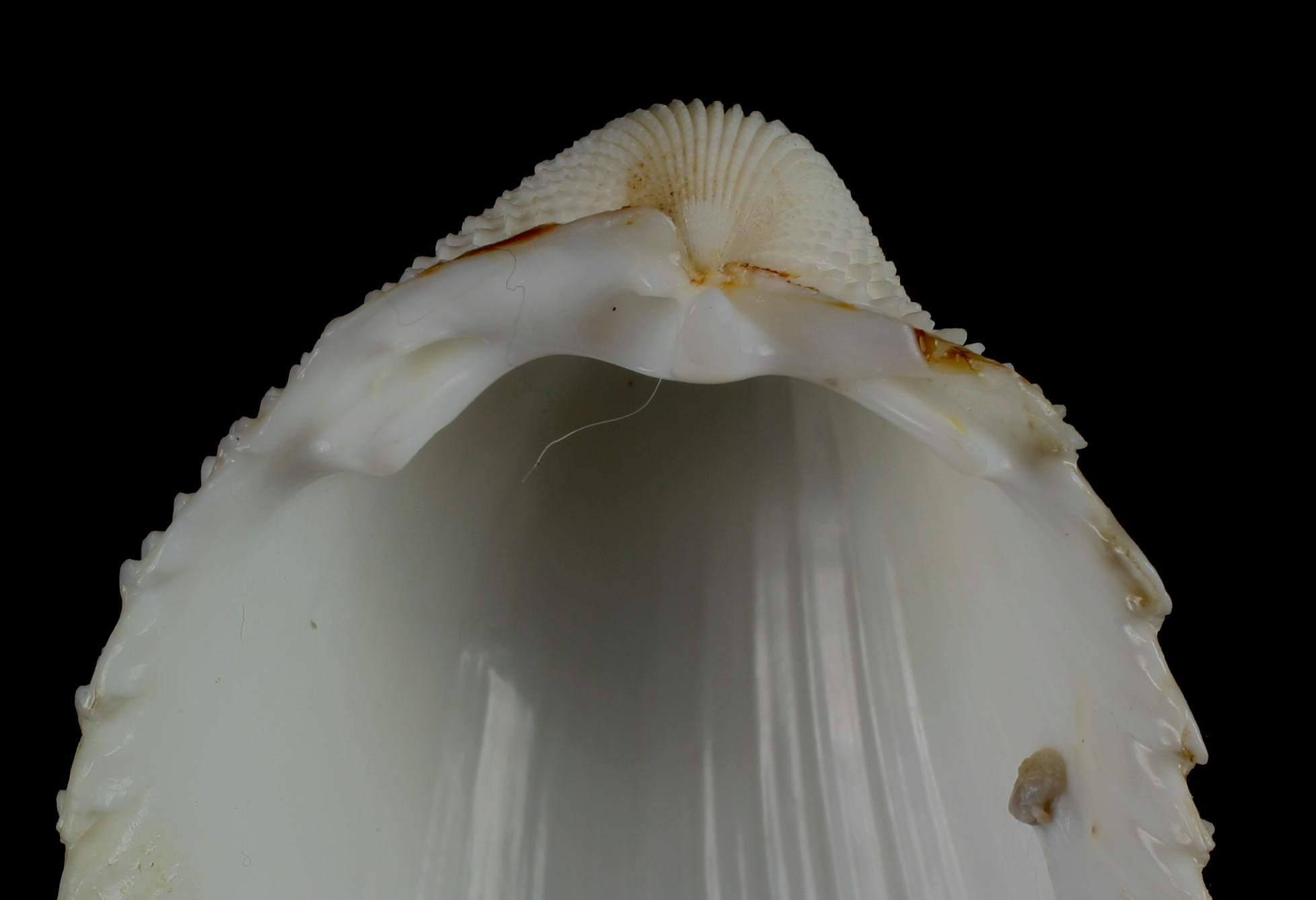
Cardiidae hinge

=== Desmodont ===
In the desmodont hinge, also known as an asthenodont hinge, the hinge consists of a large ligamentous resilifer (or chondrophore) which replaces the cardinal teeth, as in the soft-shell clams (Myidae).

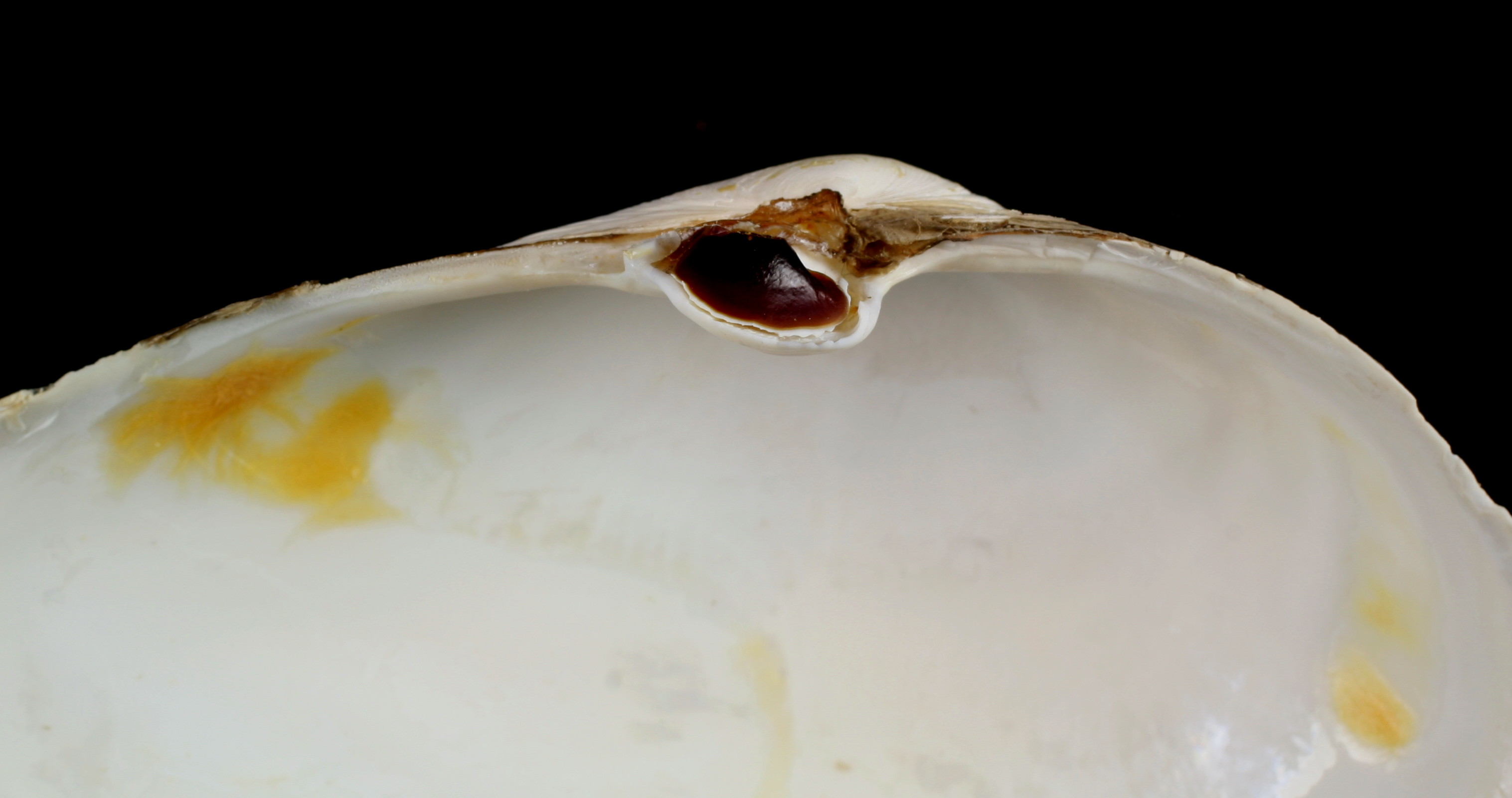
Myidae hinge

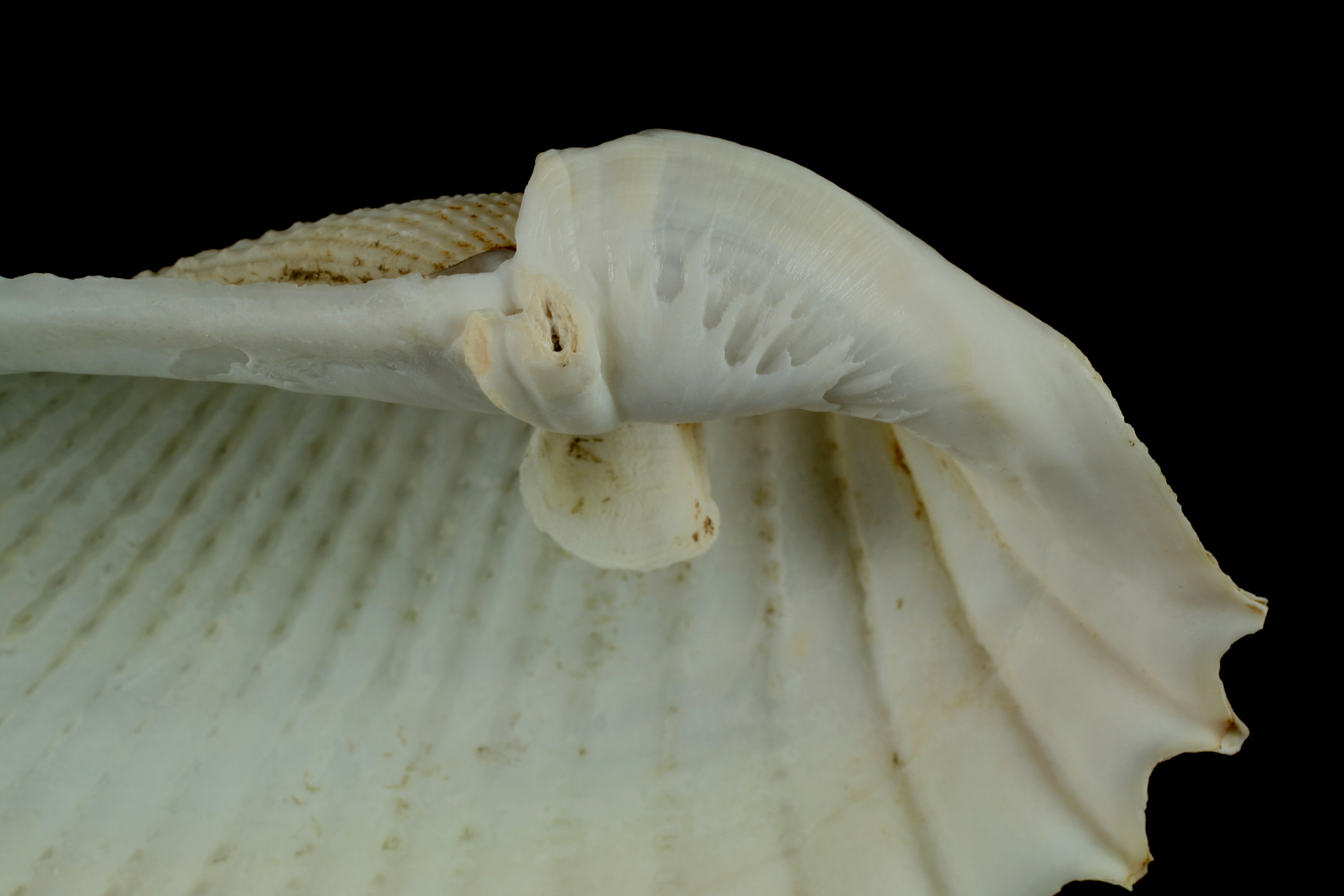
Pholadidae hinge

=== Anodont ===
The anodont hinge is characterized by a strong ligament (or a series of transverse ligamental grooves as in the Isognomonidae), however, true teeth are absent in adults as is the case in the pen shells (Pinnidae), tree oysters (Isognomonidae), the pearl oysters (Pteriidae), and some freshwater mussels such as the genus Anodonta.

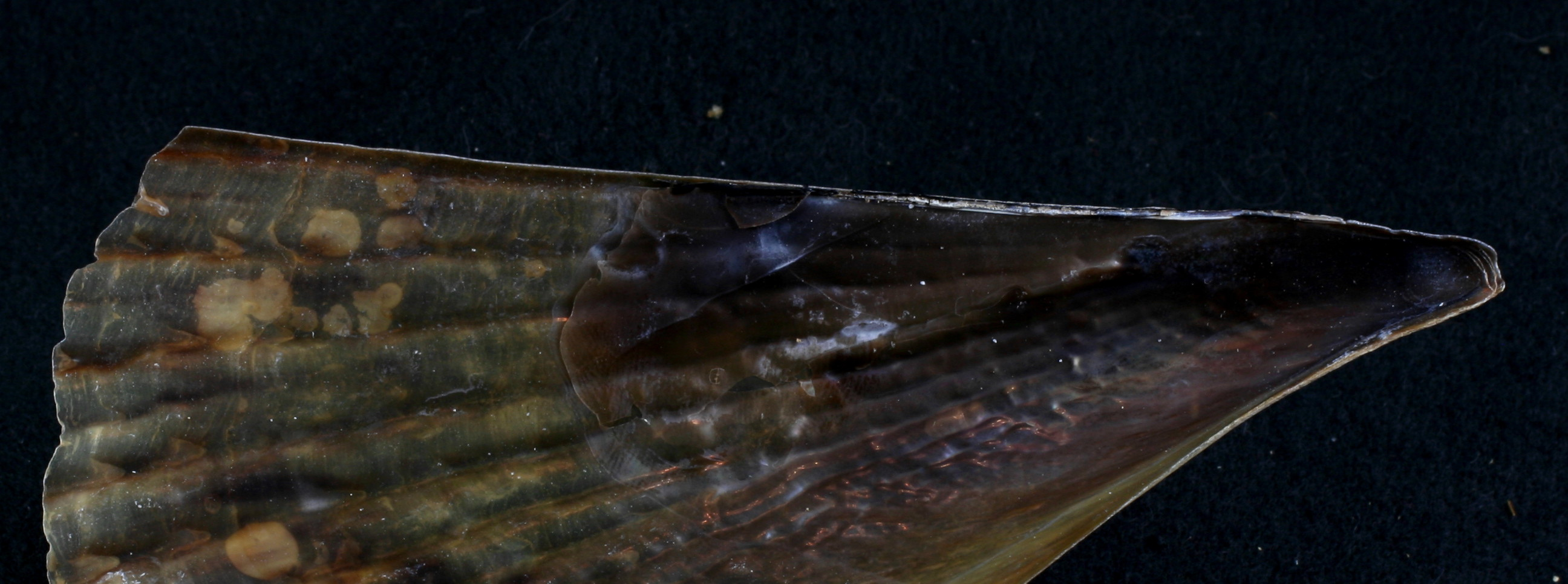
Pinnidae hinge

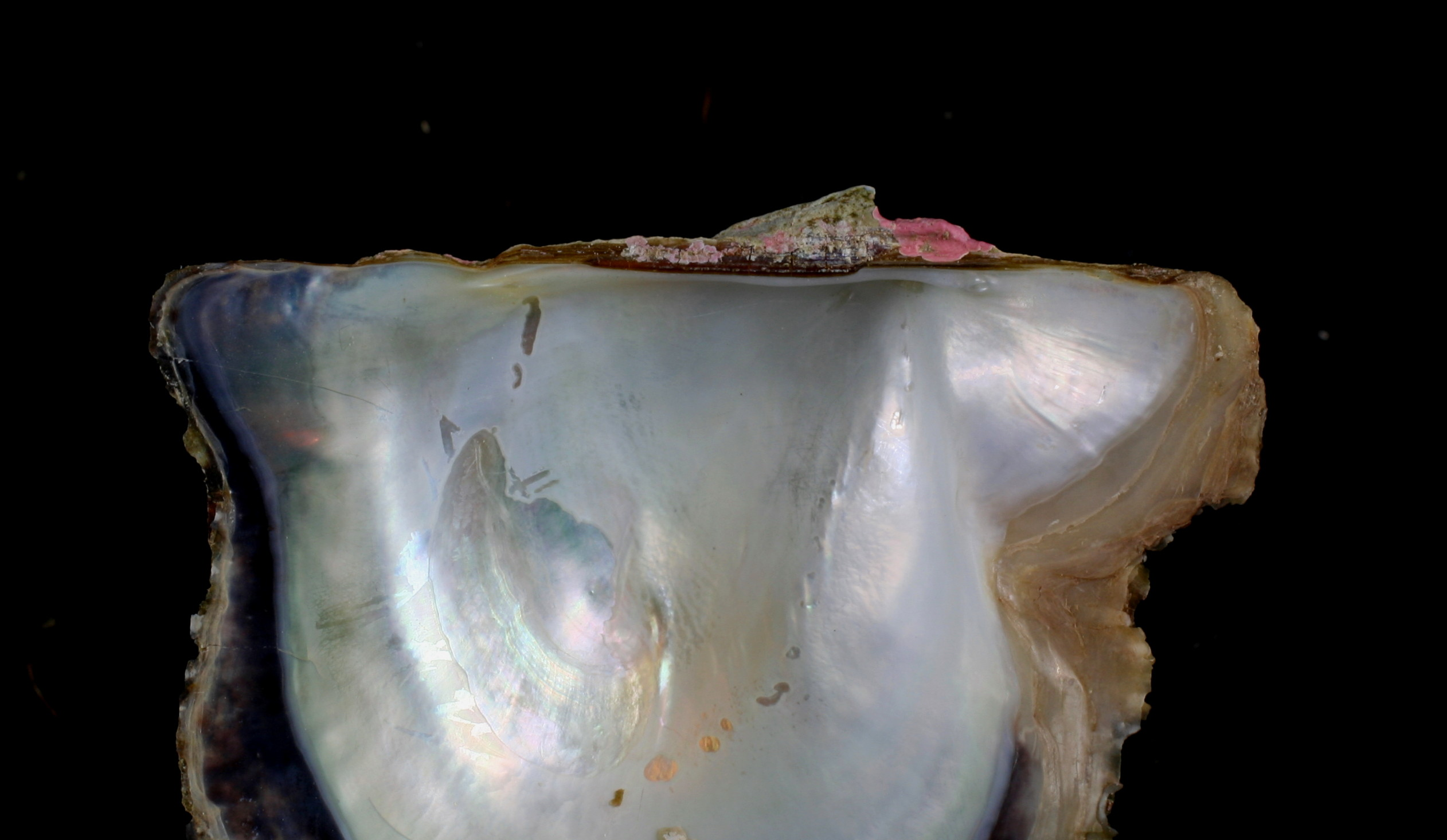
Pteriidae hinge

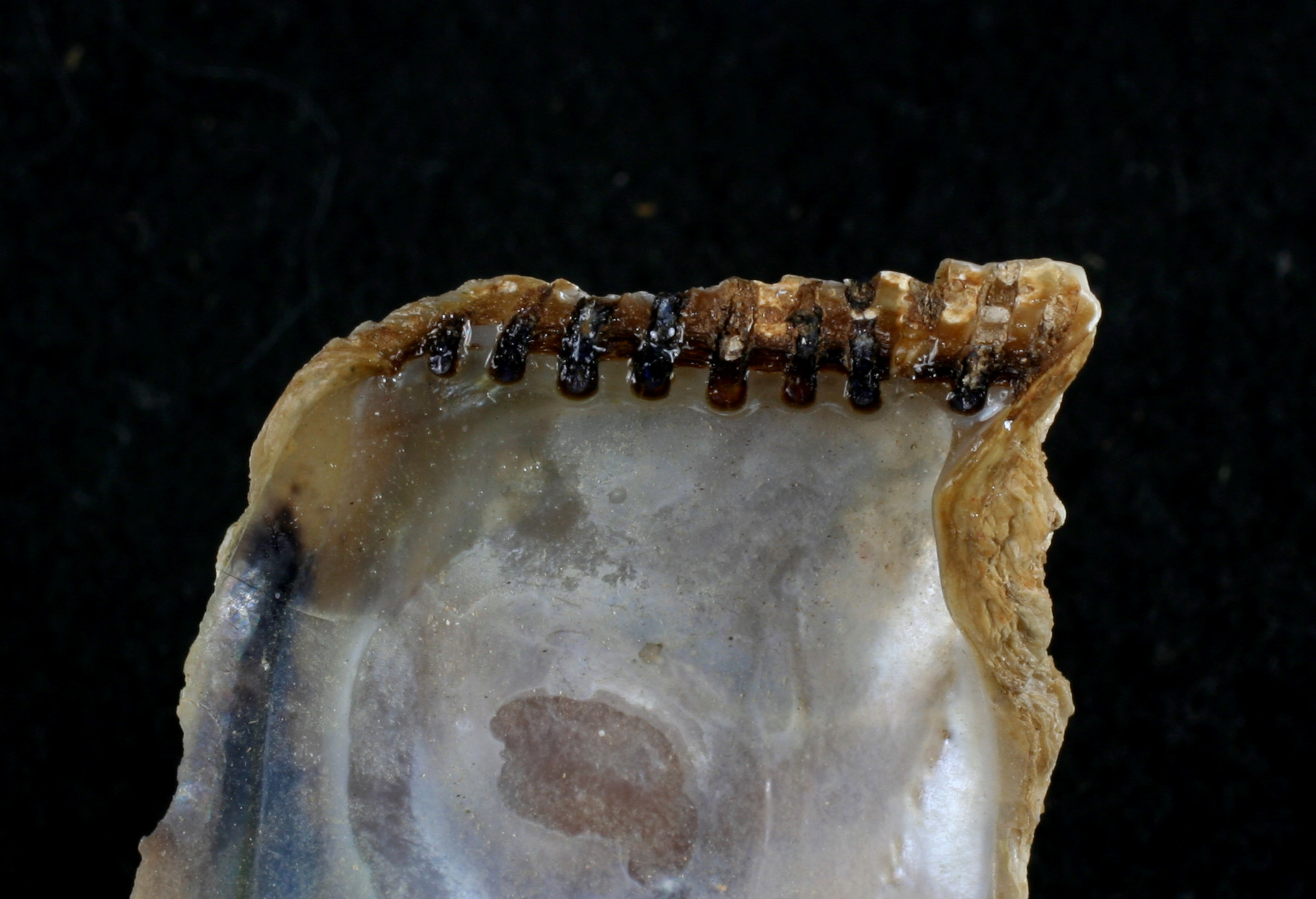
Isognomonidae hinge
