= Resilin =

Insect protein

Pro-resilin

Identifiers
- Organism: Drosophila melanogaster
- Symbol: resilin
- Alt. symbols: CG15920
- Orthologs: OMA: entry
- UniProt: Q9V7U0
Search for
- Structures: Swiss-model
- Domains: InterPro

Beating of the maxillipeds of the crayfish Pacifastacus leniusculus captured at a frame rate of 1000 Hz

Resilin is an elastomeric protein found in many insects and other arthropods. It provides soft rubber-elasticity to mechanically active organs and tissue; for example, it enables insects of many species to jump or pivot their wings efficiently. Resilin was first discovered by Torkel Weis-Fogh in locust wing-hinges.

Resilin is currently the most efficient elastic protein known (Elvin et al., 2005). The elastic efficiency of the resilin isolated from locust tendon has been reported to be 97% (only 3% of stored energy is lost as heat). It does not have any regular structure but its randomly coiled chains are crosslinked by di- and tri-tyrosine links at the right spacing to confer the elasticity needed to propel some jumping insects distances up to 38 times their length (as found in fleas). Resilin must last for the lifetime of adult insects and must therefore operate for hundreds of millions of extensions and contractions; its elastic efficiency ensures performance during the insect's lifetime. Resilin exhibits unusual elastomeric behavior only when swollen in polar solvents such as water.

In 2005, a recombinant form of the resilin protein of the fly Drosophila melanogaster was synthesized by expressing a part of the fly gene in the bacterium Escherichia coli. Active studies are investigating potential application of recombinant resilins in biomedical engineering and medicine.

== Occurrence ==
After its discovery in elastic tendons in dragon flies and wing hinges in locusts, resilin has been found in many structures and organs in arthropods. Resilin is often found as a composite with chitin in insect cuticle, where chitin serves as the structural component. Resilin provides elasticity and possibly other properties. It has been discovered in the salivary pump of assassin bugs (Rhodnius prolixus), tsetse flies, and honey bees, and in the resistance providing mechanism for the venom-dispensing pump of honey bee stingers. Resilin has also been found in the sound production organs of arthropods, such as cicadas and the moth family Pyralidae, where both high elasticity and high resilience of resilin play important roles due to the rapid stress-release cycles of sound-producing tymbals. Besides these structures, resilin exists most widely in the locomotion systems of arthropods. It was discovered in wing hinges to enable recovery from deformation of wing elements, and to dampen the aerodynamic forces felt by the wing; in ambulatory systems of cockroaches and flies to facilitate rapid joint deformation; in jumping mechanisms, resilin stores kinetic energy with great efficiency and releases it upon unloading. It is also abundant in the cuticle surrounding the abdomens of termites, ants, and bees, which expand and swell to a great extent during feeding and reproduction process.

== Composition of resilin ==
=== Amino acid constituents ===
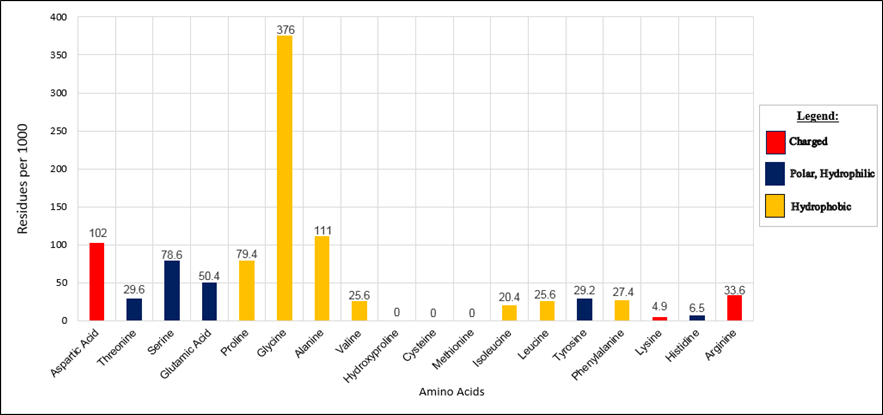
Amino acid composition of resilin

Amino acid composition in resilin was analyzed in 1961 by Bailey and Torkel Weis-Fogh when they observed samples of prealar arm and wing hinge ligaments of locusts. The result indicates that resilin lacks methionine, hydroxyproline, and cysteine constituents in its amino acid composition.

=== Protein sequence ===
Resilin was identified to be a product of the Drosophila melanogaster gene CG15920 due to the similarities between amino acid compositions of resilin and the gene product. The Drosophila melanogaster gene is composed of 4 exons, which encode for 4 functional segments in CG15920: signal peptide and 3 peptide encoded by exon 1, 2, and 3. The signal peptide guides pro-resilin into extracellular space, where resilin proteins aggregate and cross link to form a network, and then is cut off from the peptides, so that nascent resilin becomes mature resilin. From the N-terminal, segment encoded by exon 1 contains 18 copies of a 15-residue repeating sequence (GGRPSDSYGAPGGGN); segment corresponding to exon 2 contains 62 amino acids of the chitin-binding Rebers-Riddiford (R-R) consensus sequence (Pfam PF00379); exon 3 encoded peptide is dominated by 11 copies of a 13-residual repeating sequence (GYSGGRPGGQDLG). While enriched glycine and proline in exon 1 and 3 introduce cyclic structures into the protein, tyrosine residuals are able to form di- and tri-tyrosine cross-links between proteins.

=== Secondary structure ===
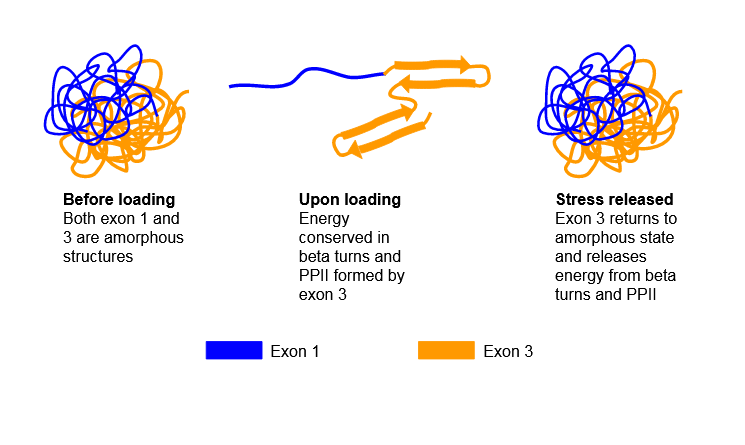
The mechanism of action of resilin

Resilin is a disordered protein; however, its segments may take on secondary structures under different conditions. It is discovered that peptide sequence encoded by exon 1 exhibit an unstructured form and cannot be crystallized, which allows the peptide sequence segment to be very soft and highly flexible. Exon 3 encoded peptide takes on the unstructured form before loading, but transforms to an ordered beta-turn structure once stress is applied. Meanwhile, segment encoded by exon 2 serves as a chitin binding domain. It is proposed that as stress is applied, or there is energy input, exon 1 encoded peptide responds immediately due to its high flexibility. Once this occurs, the energy is passed onto exon 3 encoded peptide, which transforms from the unstructured form to beta-turn structure to store energy. Once the stress or energy is removed, exon 3 encoded segment reverses the structural transformation and outputs the energy to exon 1 encoded segment.

Another secondary structure exon 1 and exon 3 corresponding peptides may take on is the polyproline helix (PPII), indicated by the high occurrence of proline and glycine in these 2 segments. The PPII structure widely exists in elastomeric proteins, such as abductin, elastin, and titin. It is believed to contribute in the self-assembling process and the elasticity of the protein. The elastic mechanism of resilin is proposed to be entropy-related. Under relaxed state, the peptide is folded, and possesses a large entropy, but once it is stretched out, the entropy decreases as the peptide unfold. The coexistence of PPII and beta-turn play an important role of increasing entropy as resilin returns to its disordered form. The other function of PPII is to facilitate self-assembling process: it is found that the quasi-extended PPII is able to interact through an intermolecular reaction, and initiate the formation of fibrillar supramolecular structure.

=== Hierarchical structure ===
While the secondary structures are determined by energy state and hydrogen bonds formed between amino acids, hierarchical structures are determined by the hydrophobicity of the peptide. Exon 1 encoded peptide is mainly hydrophilic, and is more extended when immersed in water. In contrast, exon 3 encoded peptide contains both hydrophobic and hydrophilic blocks, suggesting the formation of micelles, where the hydrophobic block will cluster on the inside with the hydrophilic portion surrounding it. Thus, a single complete resilin protein, when immersed in water, takes on the structure in which exon 1 encoded segment extends out from the micelle exon 3 encoded peptide forms.

Once resilin is transferred to the outside of the cell, their exon 2 encoded peptides, the chitin binding segments, bind to chitin. Meanwhile, di- or tri-tyrosine crosslinking is formed by oxidative coupling, mediated by peroxidase, between tyrosine residuals. Like other elastomeric proteins, the degree of cross linking in resilin is low, which ensures the low stiffness and high resilience. Cross linked peptides encoded by exon 1 have a resilience greater than 93%, while that encoded by exon 3 has a resilience of 86%. In addition, natural resilin has a resilience of 92%, similar to that of exon 1, suggesting again that exon 1 may play a more important role in the elastic property of resilin.

=== Tyrosine residues in resilin ===
Andersen, in 1996, discovered that the tyrosine residues are involved in chemically covalent cross-links in many forms such as dityrosine, trityrosine, and tetratyrosine. Primarily, in resilin, tyrosine and dityrosine served as the chemical cross-links, in which R groups of Tyrosine and Dityrosine add to the backbone of the growing peptide chain. Andersen came to this conclusion based on a study involving these two compounds in which he was able to rule out other forms of cross linking such as disulfide bridges, ester groups, and amide bonds. Though the mechanism of cross-linking of Tyrosine is understood that occurs through radical initiation, the cross linking of resilin still remains a mystery. Cross linking of resilin occurs very quickly and this is possibly a result of temperature. At increasing temperature, the rate of cross linking of the residues increases and leads to a highly cross-linked resilin network.

The amino acid composition of resilin indicates that proline and glycine has a relatively high presence in the amino acid composition of resilin. The presence of glycine and proline in the composition of resilin contributes greatly to the elasticity of resilin. Resilin, however, has an absence of an alpha-helix leading to a randomly coiled structure and a disordered structure. This is primarily due to the significantly high proline content in resilin. Proline is a bulky amino acid that has the ability to cause a kink the peptide chain and due to the sterically hindered side chains, it is not able to fit in the alpha-helices. However, the segments of resilin are able to take on secondary structure forms at different conditions.

== Properties ==
Like other biomaterials, resilin is a hydrogel, meaning it is swollen with water. The water content of resilin at neutral pH is 50–60%, and the absence of this water will make a big difference on the material's property: while the hydrated resilin behaves like a rubber, the dehydrated resilin has the properties of a glassy polymer. However, dehydrated resilin is able to return to its rubbery state if water is available. Water serves as a plasticizer in resilin network by increasing the amount of hydrogen bonds. The high concentration of proline and glycine, polyproline helices, and hydrophilic portions all serves to increase water content in resilin protein network. The increase in hydrogen bonds lead to an increase in chain mobility, thus decreases glass transition temperature. The more water content is in resilin network, the less stiff and more resilient the material is. Dehydrated resilin behaves as a glass polymer with low stiffness, strain, and resilience, but a relatively high compressible modulus and glass transition temperature.

Rubber like proteins, such as resilin and elastin, are characterized based on their high resilience, low stiffness, and large strain. A high resilience indicate that a sufficient amount of energy input can be stored in the material, and released afterwards. An example of energy input is to stretch the material. Natural resilin (hydrated) has a resilience of 92%, which means it can store 92% of the energy input for release during unloading, indicating a very efficient energy transfer. For a better understanding of the stiffness and strain of resilin, Hooke's law should be taken into consideration. For linear springs, Hooke's law states that the force required to deform the spring is directly proportional to the amount of deformation by a constant which is the characteristic of the spring. A material is viewed as elastic when it can be deformed to a large extend with a limited amount of force. Hydrated resilin has a tensile modulus of 640–2000 kPa, an unconfined compressive modulus of 600–700 kPa, and a strain to break of 300%.

Table 1: Properties of hydrated and dehydrated resilin
Properties	Hydrated resilin	Dehydrated resilin
Elastic Modulus	588 kPa	-
Compressive Modulus	600–700 kPa	10,200 ± 2% kPa
Tensile Modulus	640–2000 kPa	-
Tensile Strength	4MPa	-
Maximum Strain	300%	-
Resilience	92%	-
T_{g}°	<37 °C	>180 °C

Although there has been no actual data acquired for the fatigue lifetime of resilin, we can think about this intuitively. If we consider the case of honey bees, where they live for around 8 weeks during which they fly 8 hours a day, flapping wings at 720,000 cycles/h, they are likely to flap their wings more than 300 million times [9]. Since resilin functions over the entire lifetime of insects, its fatigue lifetime should be considerably large. However, in live insects, resilin molecular can be produced and replaced constantly, which introduces an error in our conclusion.

== Recombinant resilin ==
=== Initial studies ===
Due to the remarkable rubber elasticity of resilin, scientists began exploring recombinant versions for a variety of material and medical applications. With the rise in DNA technologies, this field of research has seen a rapid increase in the synthesis of biosynthetic protein polymers that can be tuned to having certain mechanical properties. Thus, this field of research is rather promising and can provide new methods for treating diseases and disorders that affect the population. Recombinant resilin was first studied in 2005 when it was expressed in Escherichia coli from the first exon of the Drosophila melanogaster's CG15920 gene. During its study, pure resilin was synthesized into 20% protein-mass hydrogel and was cross-linked with ruthenium-catalyzed tyrosine in the presence of ultraviolet light. This reaction yielded the product, recombinant resilin (rec1-Resilin).

One of the most important aspects of successful rec1-Resilin synthesis is that its mechanical properties match that of the original resilin (native resilin). In the study indicated above, scanning probe microscopy (SPM) and atomic-force microscopy (AFM) were used to investigate the mechanical properties of rec1-Resilin and native resilin. The results of these tests revealed that the resilience of both recombinant and native resilin were relatively similar but can differ in its applications. In this study, rec1-Resilin could be placed into a polymeric scaffold to mimic the extracellular matrix in order to generate a cell and tissue responses. Though this field of research is still ongoing, it has generated a wide amount of interest in the scientific community and is currently being investigated for a variety of biomedical applications in areas of tissue regeneration and repair.

=== Fluorescence of recombinant resilin ===
One unique property of rec1-Resilin is its ability to be identified due to autofluorescence. Fluorescence for resilin stems primarily from dityrosine, which are the result of crosslinks of tyrosine residues. When ultraviolet light irradiates a sample of rec1-Resilin at 315 nm to 409 nm emissions, the rec1-Resilin begins to show blue fluorescence. An example of the blue fluorescence exhibited by the dityrosine residues in resilin is shown in the figure below of a flea.

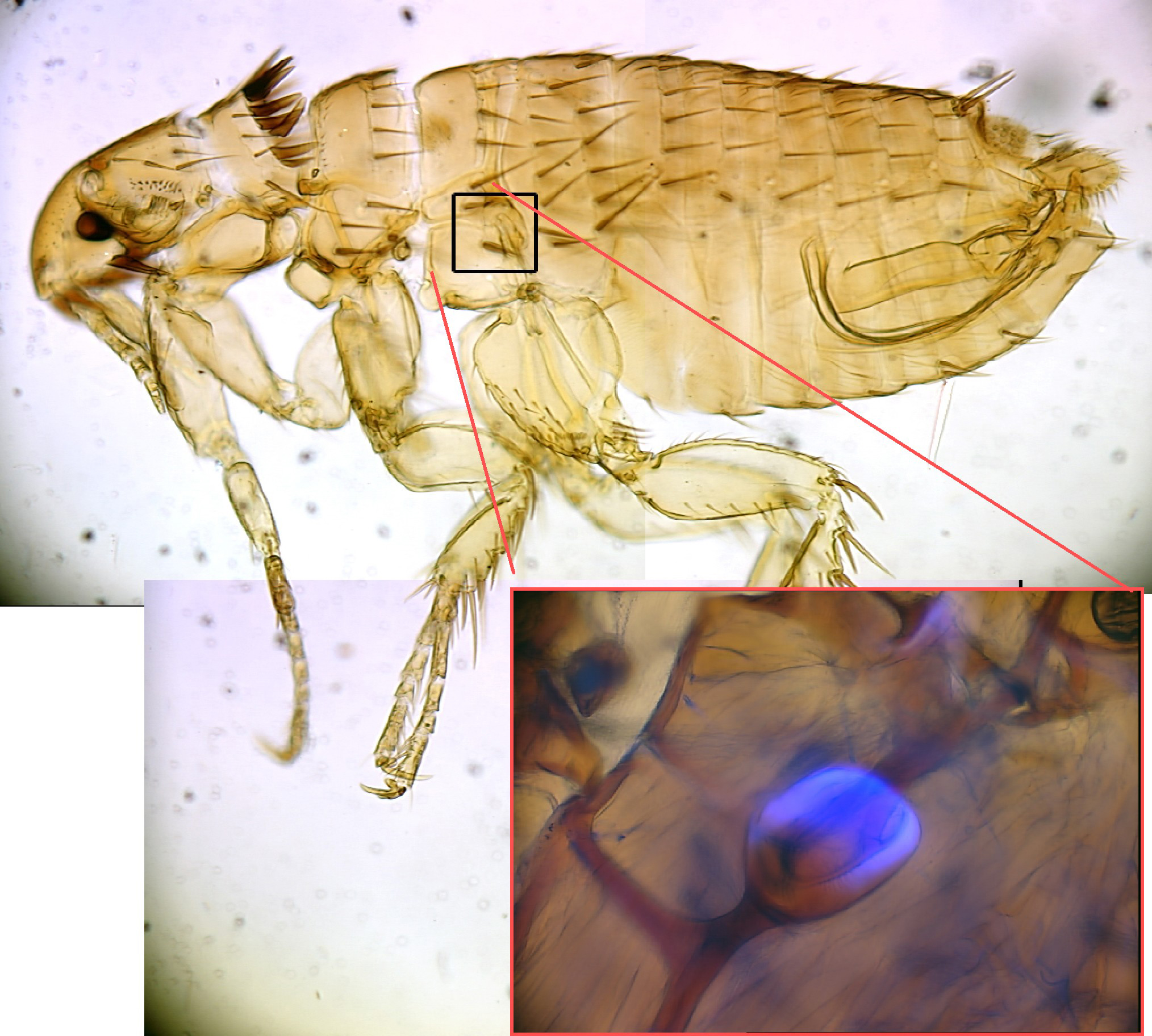
CSIRO image of a flea with detail showing the resilin pad

=== Resilience ===
Another unique property of resilin is its high resilience. Recombinant resilin demonstrated excellent mechanical properties similar to that of pure resilin. Elvin et al. aimed to compare the resilience of rec1-Resilin to other rubbers, a scanning probe microscope of used. This study compared the resilience of rec1-Resilin to two different types of rubber: chlorobutyl rubber and polybutadiene rubber, both rubbers with high resilience properties. This study concluded that rec1-Resilin was 92% resilient compared to chlorobutyl rubber at 56% and polybutadiene rubber at 80%, respectively. With such high mechanical resilience, the properties of rec1-Resilin can be applied to other clinical applications within the field of Materials Engineering and Medicine. This study on recombinant resilin has led to several years of research on the use of resilin like proteins for several biomedical applications that retains the mechanical properties of resilin. The ongoing results of the studies involving recombinant resilin may lead to further research in which other unexplored mechanical properties and chemical structure of resilin may be investigated.

=== Clinical applications ===
Recombinant resilins have been studied for potential application in the fields of biomedical engineering and medicine. In particular, hydrogels composed of recombinant resilins have been used as tissue engineering scaffolds for mechanically-active tissues including cardiovascular, cartilage and vocal cord tissues. Early work has focused on optimizing the mechanical properties, chemistry and cytocompability of these materials, but some in vivo testing of resilin hydrogels has also been performed. Researchers at the University of Delaware and Purdue University have developed methods for creating elastic hydrogels composed of resilin that were compatible with stem cells and displayed similar rubber elasticity to that of natural resilin. Semi-synthetic resilin-based hydrogels, which incorporate poly(ethylene glycols), have also been reported.

== See also ==
- elastin: a vertebrate protein
