= Ligament (bivalve) =

Part of the bivalve shell

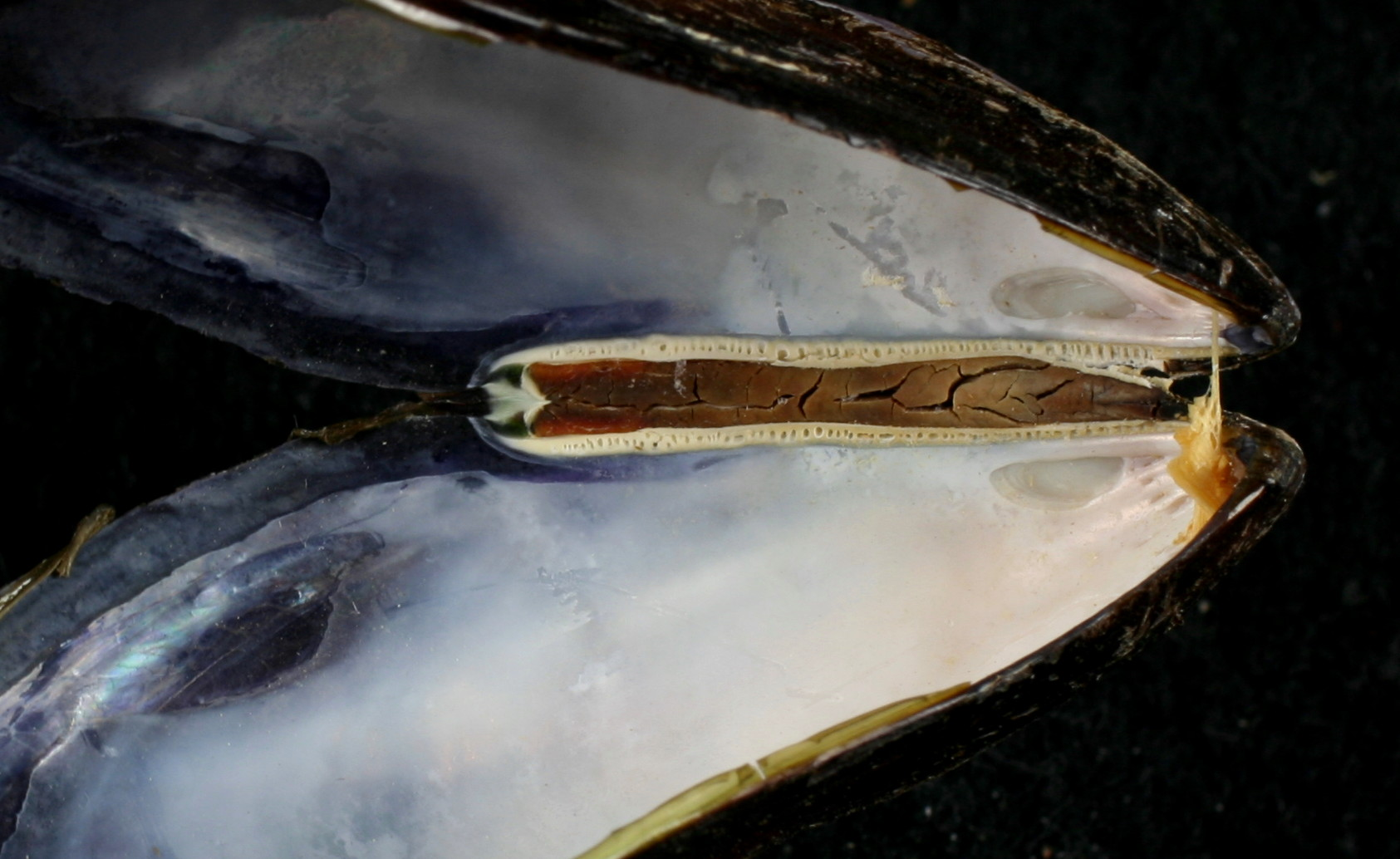
This interior view of the hinge line of a blue mussel, Mytilidae shows the external ligament, which is dried out and cracked in this specimen

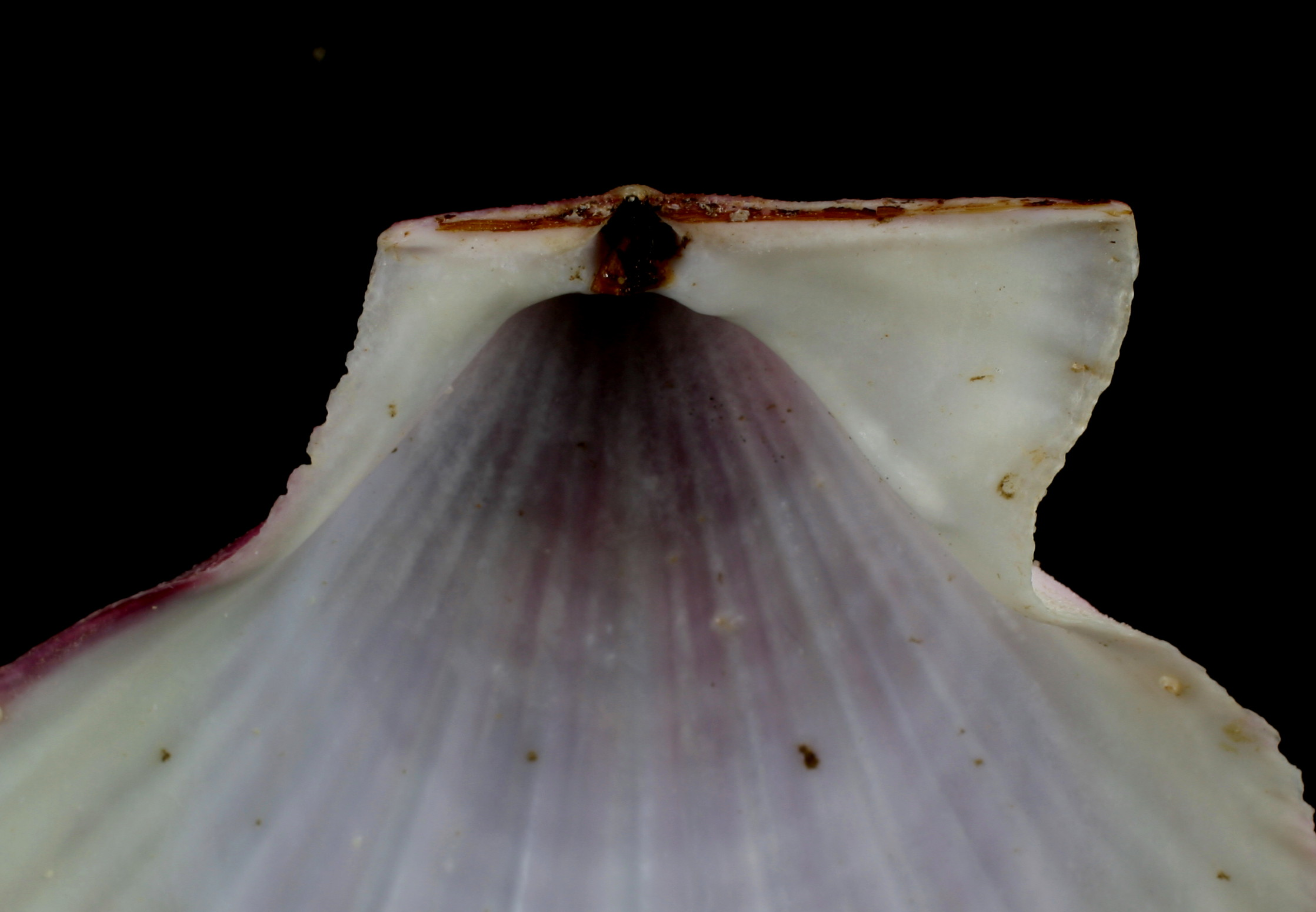
This interior view of the hinge line of a scallop shell Pectinidae shows the internal ligament, located in the resilifer.

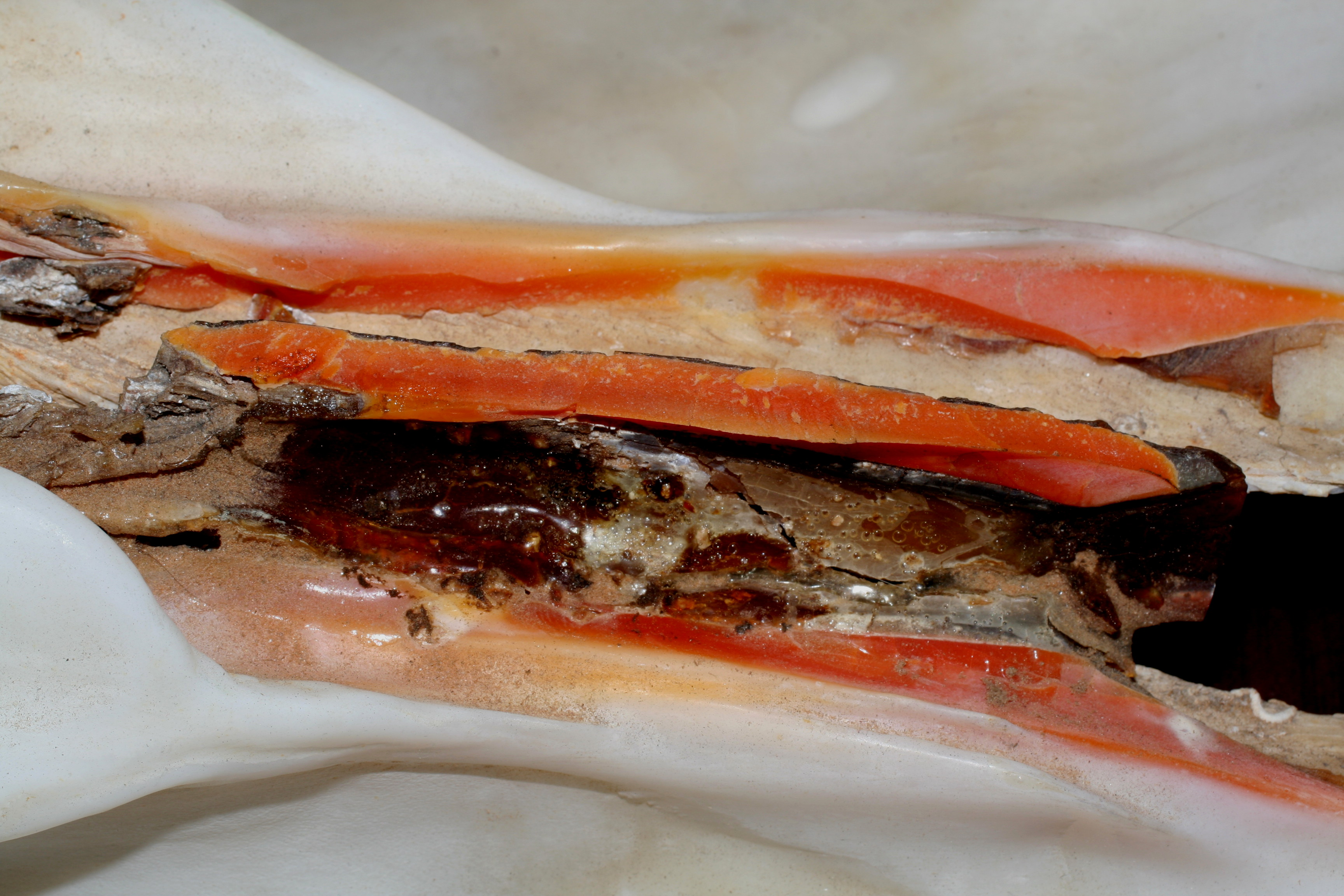
Interior view of the hinge ligament of Tridacna derasa

A hinge ligament is a crucial part of the anatomical structure of a bivalve shell, i.e. the shell of a bivalve mollusk. The shell of a bivalve has two valves and these are joined by the ligament at the dorsal edge of the shell. The ligament is made of a strong, flexible and elastic, fibrous, proteinaceous material which is usually pale brown, dark brown or black in color.

In life, the shell needs to be able to open a little (to allow the foot and siphons to protrude) and then close again. As well as connecting the two bivalve shells together at the hinge line, the ligament also functions as a spring which automatically opens the valves when the adductor muscle or muscles (that close the valves) relax.

== Composition ==
The ligament is an uncalcified elastic structure comprised in its most minimal state of two layers: a lamellar layer and a fibrous layer. The lamellar layer consists entirely of organic material (a protein and collagen matrix), is generally brown in color, and is elastic in response to both compressional and tensional stresses. The fibrous layer is made of aragonite fibers and organic material, is lighter in color and often iridescent, and is elastic only under compressional stress. The protein responsible for the elasticity of the ligament is abductin, which has enormous elastic resiliency: this resiliency is what causes the valves of the bivalve mollusk to open when the adductor muscles relax.

Ligaments that are simple morphologically have a central fibrous layer between the anterior and posterior lamellar layers. Repetitive ligaments are morphologically more complex, and display additional, repeated layers. A recent study using scanning electron microscopy(SEM), X-ray diffraction (XRD), and infrared spectroscopy (FTIR), found that some bivalve mollusks have a third type of fibrous layer in the ligament (located in the middle) which has a unique spring-like protein fiber (ca. 120 nm in diameter) structure, stretching continuously from the left to right valve.

== Elastic opening of valves ==
When the adductor muscles of a bivalve mollusk contract, the valves close, which compresses the ligament. When the adductor muscles relax again, the elastic resiliency of the ligament reopens the shell. Scallops (Pectinidae) swim through the water column by rapidly and repeatedly clapping (opening and closing) their valves. An interesting fact about scallops swimming in this manner is that they recover a greater percentage of the work (as defined by physics) performed through the elasticity of their abductin than do other bivalves (which are more sedentary clams).

== Taxonomic use ==
The hinge ligament of a bivalve shell can be either internal, external, or both, and is an example of complex development. Various types of hinge ligaments have been found in living species (i.e. extant species), and the ligaments can be reconstructed in most fossil bivalves based on their sites of attachment on the shell. The taxonomic distribution of ligament types among families of bivalves has been used by paleontologists and malacologists as a means of inferring phylogenic evolution.

== Hinge ligament types ==
External hinge ligaments may be described as having an "orientation" that is amphidetic (between the beaks), opisthodetic (behind/ posterior to the beaks), or, rarely, prosodetic (before the beaks). Then, there are four main "structural types": alivincular (a flattened, usually triangular area with a central fibrous layer and a peripheral lamellar layer), duplivincular (alternating bands of fibrous and lamellar layers forming chevrons on the cardinal area), parivincular (a single arched structure behind the beaks), and planivincular (a long ligament with a slight arch that extends behind the beaks).

An internal ligament is usually called a resilium and is attached to a resilifer or chrondophore, which is a depression or pit inside the shell near the umbo.

== General references ==
E.R. Trueman, General features of Bivalvia. In: Moore R.C., editor. Bivalvia. Ligament. In: Treatise on invertebrate paleontology. Vol. 2. Geological Society of America and University of Kansas Press; 1969. p. N58-N64. Part N - Mollusca, Bivalvia Vol. 6.

T.R. Waller, The evolution of ligament systems in the Bivalvia. In: Morton B., editor. Proceedings of a Memorial Symposium in Honour of Sir Charles Maurice Yonge, Edinburgh, 1986. Hong Kong: Hong Kong University Press; 1990. p. 49-71.

J. G. Carter, Evolutionary significance of shell microstructure in the Paleotaxodonta, Pteriomorphia and Isofilibranchia (Bivalvia: Mollusca). In: Carter J.G., editor. Skeletal biomineralization: patterns, processes, and evolutionary trends. New York: Van Nostrand Reinhold; 1990. p. 135-296.
