= Resilifer =

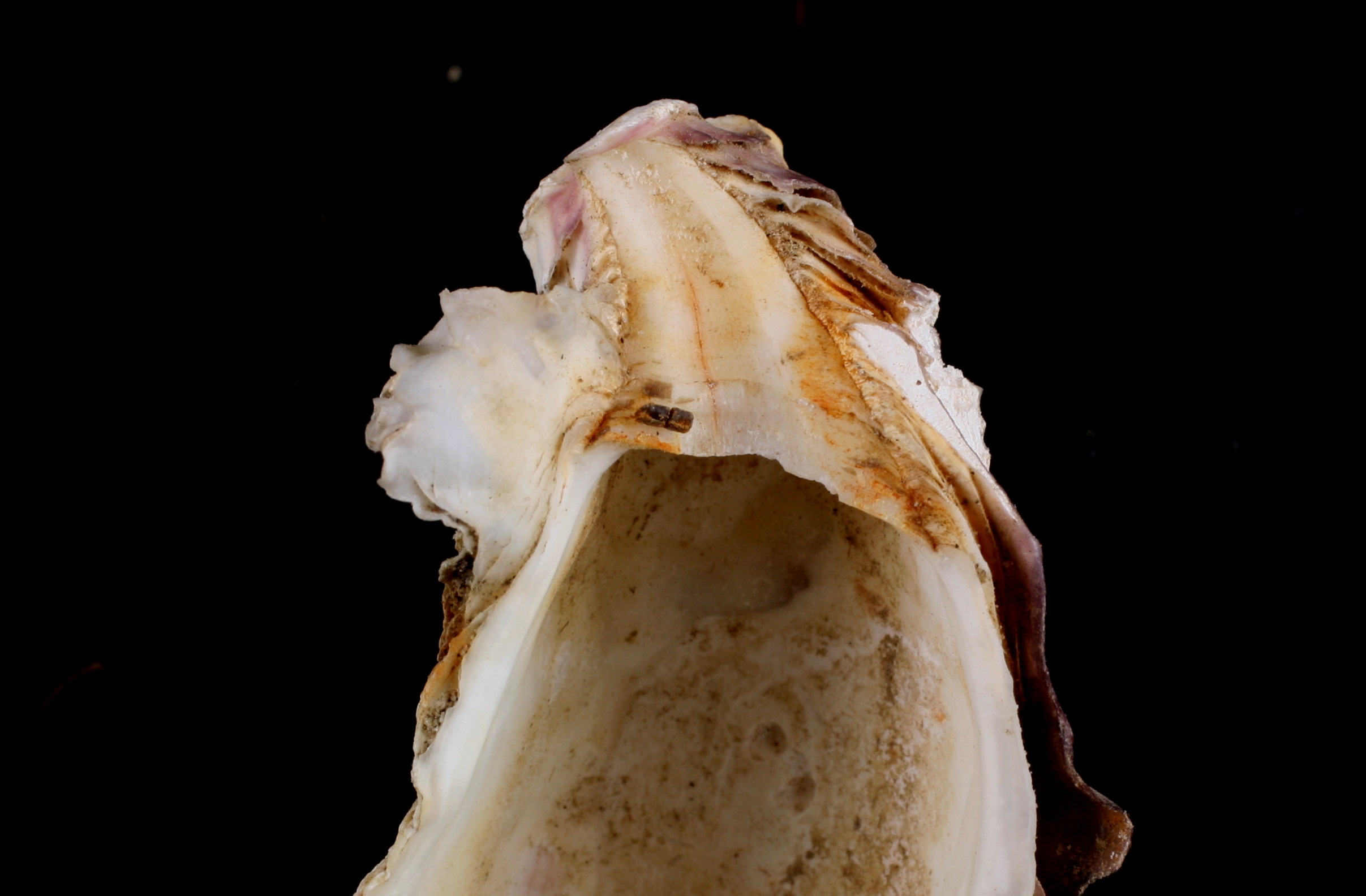
Hinge area in one valve of an oyster shell (Ostreidae), showing the groove that is the resilifer

A resilifer is a part of the shell of certain bivalve mollusks. It is either a recess (a pit or groove of some sort) or a process, the function of which is the attachment of an internal ligament, which holds the two valves together.

An internal ligament (which requires a resilifer to function) is part of the hinge mechanism in certain taxonomic families of bivalve shells, such as oysters and scallops. A resilifer (and its associated ligament) is the primary structure comprising the type of bivalve hinge that is known as an "isodont" hinge.

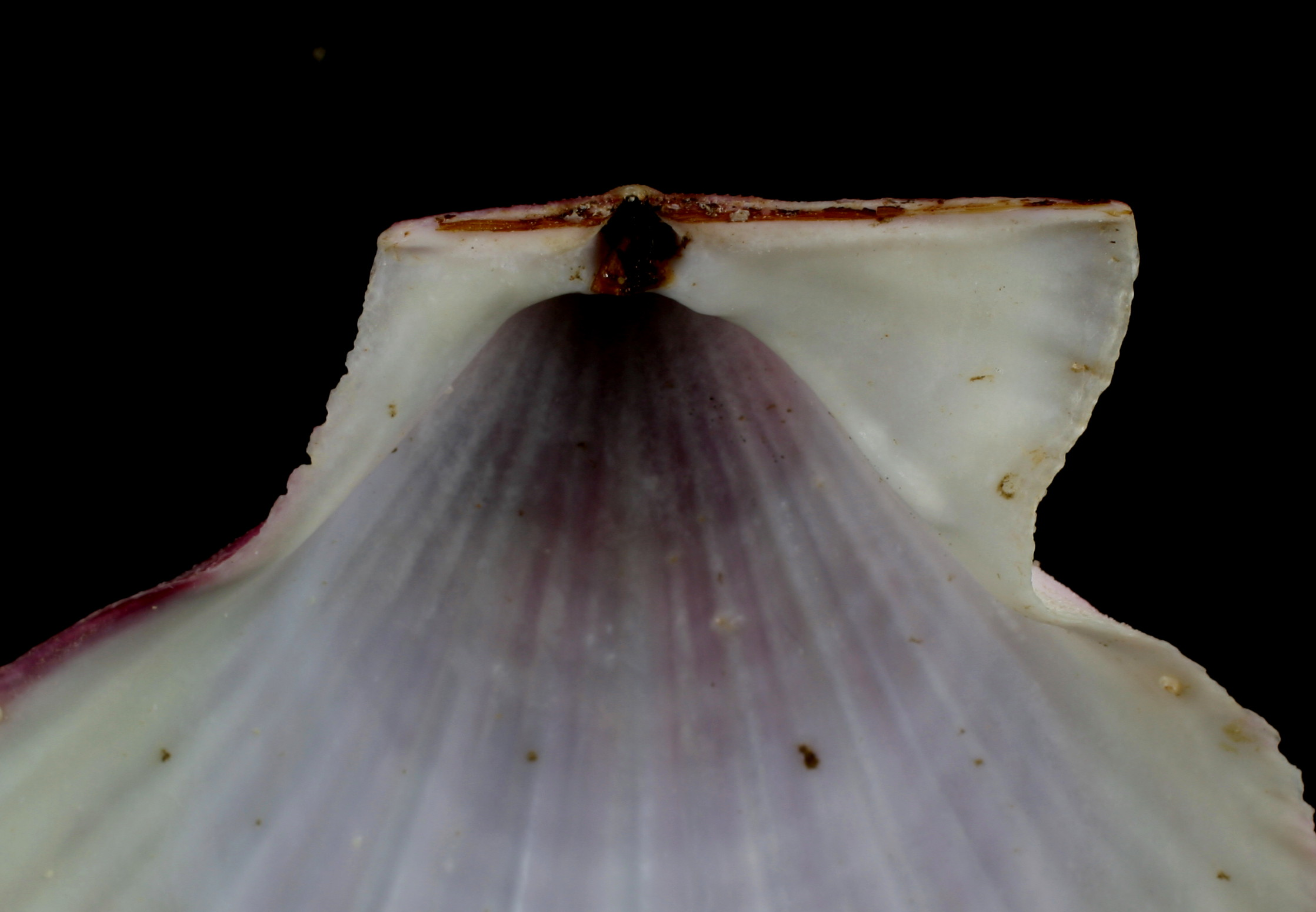
The hinge area in one valve of a scallop shell (Pectinidae), showing the internal ligament still positioned in the resilifer
