= Intelectin =

Type of carbohydrate-binding protein

Xenopus embryonic epidermal lectin
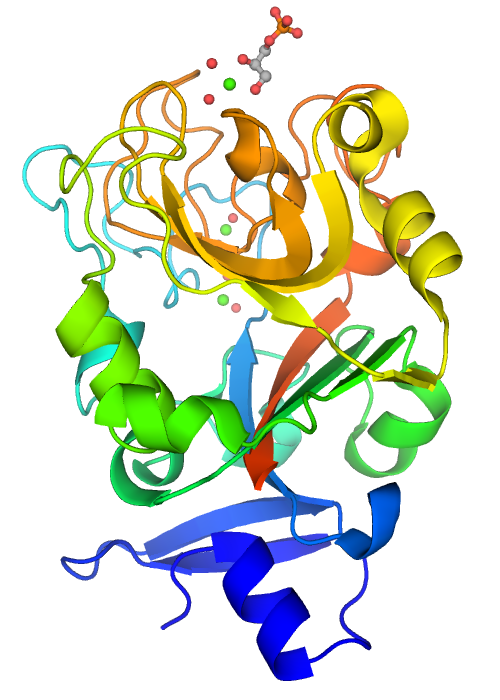
- Monomeric structure of XEEL-CRD with bound D-glycerol 1-phosphate. The protein is colored using a blue-red gradient from the N- to the C- terminus. Calcium ions are shown as green spheres and the coordinated water molecules are shown as red spheres.

Identifiers
- Organism: Xenopus laevis
- Symbol: itln1
- Entrez: 398574
- Orthologs: NCBI: entry; OMA: entry
- PDB: 4WN0
- RefSeq (mRNA): NM_001089101.1
- RefSeq (Prot): NP_001082570.1
- UniProt: Q800K0
Search for
- Structures: Swiss-model
- Domains: InterPro

Human intelectin-1
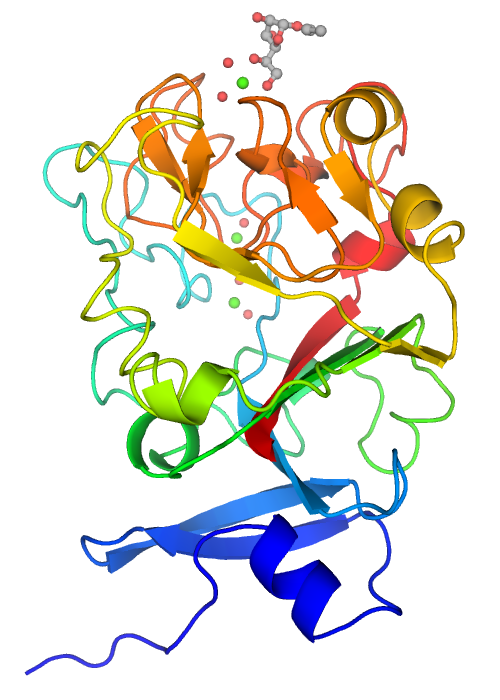
- Monomeric structure of human intelectin with bound allyl-beta-D-galactofuranose. The protein is colored using a blue-red gradient from the N- to the C- terminus. Calcium ions are shown as green spheres and the coordinated water molecules are shown as red spheres.

Identifiers
- Symbol: ITLN1
- Alt. symbols: hIntL-1
- NCBI gene: 55600
- HGNC: 18259
- OMIM: 609873
- PDB: 4WMY
- RefSeq: NP_060095
- UniProt: Q8WWA0

Other data
- Locus: Chr. 1 q21.3
Search for
- Structures: Swiss-model
- Domains: InterPro

Intelectins are lectins (carbohydrate-binding proteins) expressed in humans and other chordates. Humans express two types of intelectins encoded by ITLN1 and ITLN2 genes respectively. Several intelectins bind microbe-specific carbohydrate residues. Therefore, intelectins have been proposed to function as immune lectins. Even though intelectins contain fibrinogen-like domain found in the ficolins family of immune lectins, there is significant structural divergence. Thus, intelectins may not function through the same lectin-complement pathway. Most intelectins are still poorly characterized and they may have diverse biological roles. Human intelectin-1 (hIntL-1) has also been shown to bind lactoferrin, but the functional consequence has yet to be elucidated. Additionally, hIntL-1 is a major component of asthmatic mucus and may be involved in insulin physiology as well.

== Diversity ==
The first intelectin was discovered in Xenopus laevis oocyte and is named XL35 or XCGL-1. X. laevis oocyte also contains a closely related XCGL-2. In addition, X. laevis embryos secrete Xenopus embryonic epidermal lectin into the environmental water, presumably to bind microbes. XSL-1 and XSL-2 are also expressed in X. laevis serum when stimulated with lipopolysaccharide. Two additional intestinal intelectins are discovered in X. laevis

Human has two intelectins: hIntL-1 (omentin) and hIntL-2. Mouse also has two intelectins: mIntL-1 and mIntL-2.

== Immune system ==
Several lines of evidence suggest that intelectins recognize microbes and may function as an innate immune defense protein. Tunicate intelectin is an opsonin for phagocytosis by hemocyte. Amphioxus intelectin has been shown to agglutinate bacteria. In zebrafish and rainbow trout, intelectin expression is stimulated upon microbial exposure. Mammals such as sheep and mice also upregulate intelectin expression upon parasitic infection. Increase in intelectin expression upon microbial exposure support the hypothesis that intelectins play a role in the immune system.

== Structure ==
Although intelectins require calcium ion for function, the sequences bear no resemblance to C-type lectins. In addition, merely around 50 amino acids (the fibronogen-like domain) align with any known protein, specifically the ficolin family. The first structural details of an intelectin comes from the crystal structure of selenomethionine-labeled XEEL carbohydrate-recognition domain (Se-Met XEEL-CRD) solved by Se-SAD. XEEL-CRD was expressed and Se-Met-labeled in High Five insect cells using a recombinant baculovirus. The fibrinogen-like fold is conserved despite amino acid sequence divergence. However, extensive insertions are present in intelectin compared to ficolins, thus making intelectin a distinct lectin structural class. The Se-Met XEEL-CRD structure then enables the structure solution by molecular replacement of D-glycerol 1-phosphate (GroP)-bound XEEL-CRD, apo-human intelectin-1 (hIntL-1), and galactofuranose-bound hIntL-1.

Each polypeptide chain of XEEL and hIntL-1 contains three bound calcium ions: two in the structural calcium site and one in the ligand binding site. The amino acid residues in the structural calcium site are conserved among intelectins, thus it is likely that most, if not all, intelectins have two structural calcium ions.

In the ligand binding site of XEEL and hIntL-1, the exocyclic vicinal diol of the carbohydrate ligand directly coordinates to the calcium ion. There are large variations in the ligand binding site residues among intelectin homologs suggesting that the intelectin family may have broad ligand specificities and biological functions. As there is no intelectin numbering conventions in different organisms, one should not assume functional homology based on the intelectin number. For example, hIntL-1 has glutamic acid residues in the ligand binding site to coordinate a calcium ion, while zebrafish intelectin-1 are devoided of these acidic residues. Zebrafish intelectin-2 ligand binding site residues are similar to those present in hIntL-1.

Ligand binding mode of intelectins
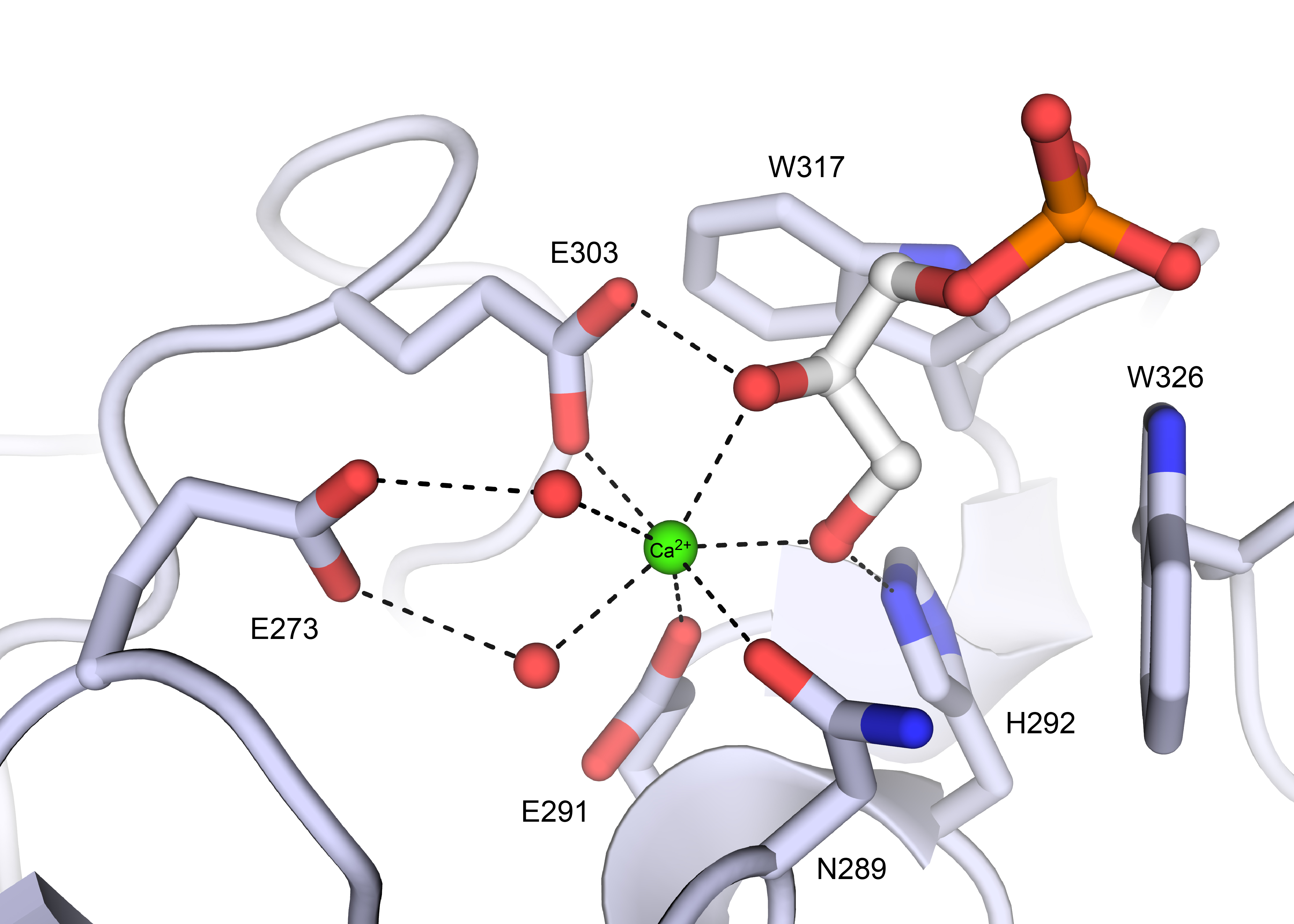
Xenopus embryonic epidermal lectin (XEEL) ligand binding site with bound D-glycerol 1-phosphate. The calcium ion is shown as a green sphere and the ordered water molecules are shown as red spheres.

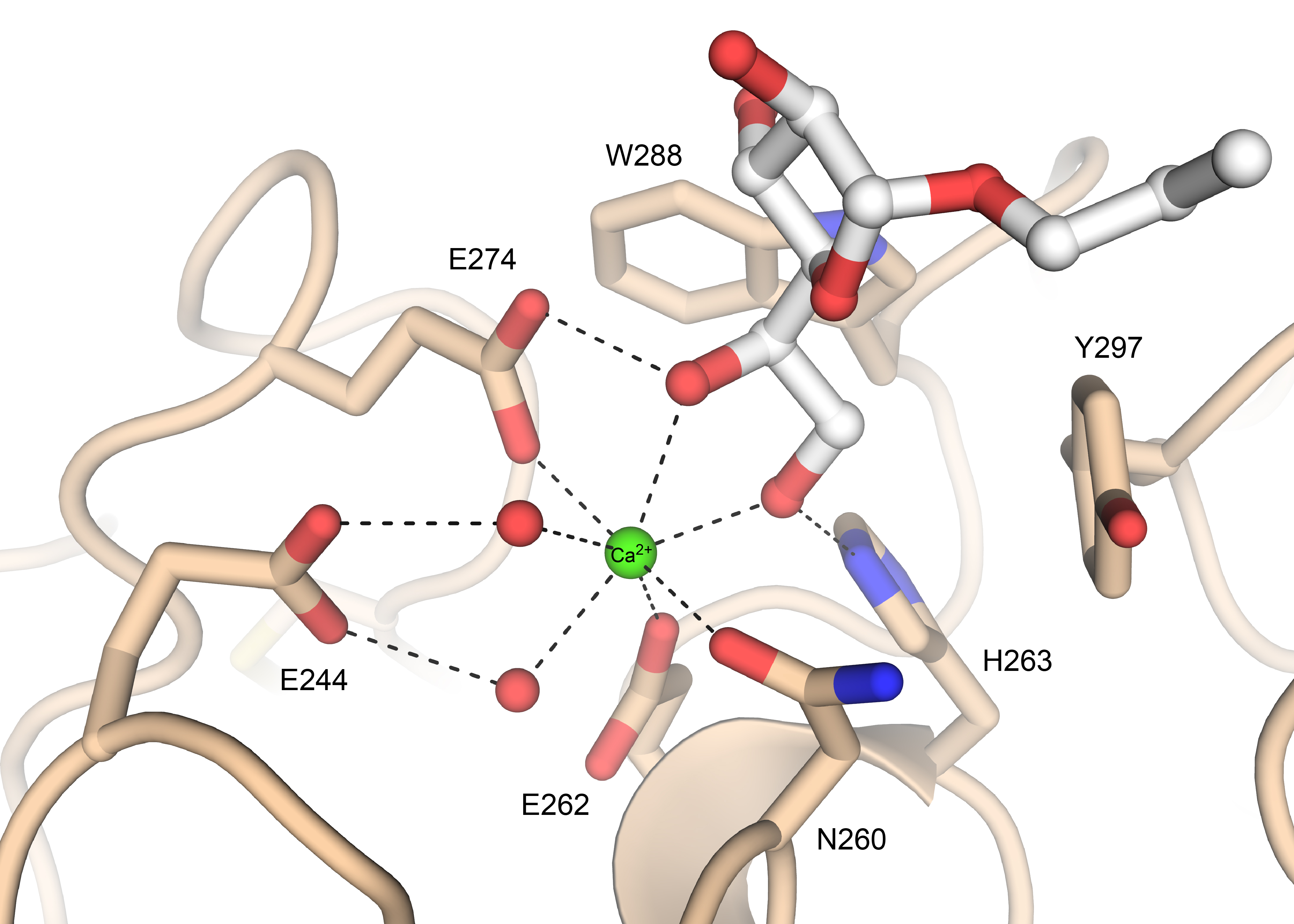
Human intelectin-1 (hIntL-1) ligand binding site with bound allyl-beta-D-galactofuranose. The calcium ion is shown as a green sphere and the ordered water molecules are shown as red spheres.

== Oligomeric state ==
hIntL-1 is a disulfide-linked trimer as shown by non-reducing SDS-PAGE and X-ray crystallography. Despite lacking the intermolecular disulfide bonds, XEEL-CRD is trimeric in solution. The N-terminal peptide of the full length XEEL is responsible for dimerizing the trimeric XEEL-CRD into a disulfide-linked hexameric full-length XEEL. Therefore, the N-termini of intelectins are often responsible for forming disulfide-linked oligomer. In intelectin homologs where the N-terminal cysteines are absent, the CRD itself may still capable of forming non-covalent oligomer in solution.

Trimeric structures of intelectins
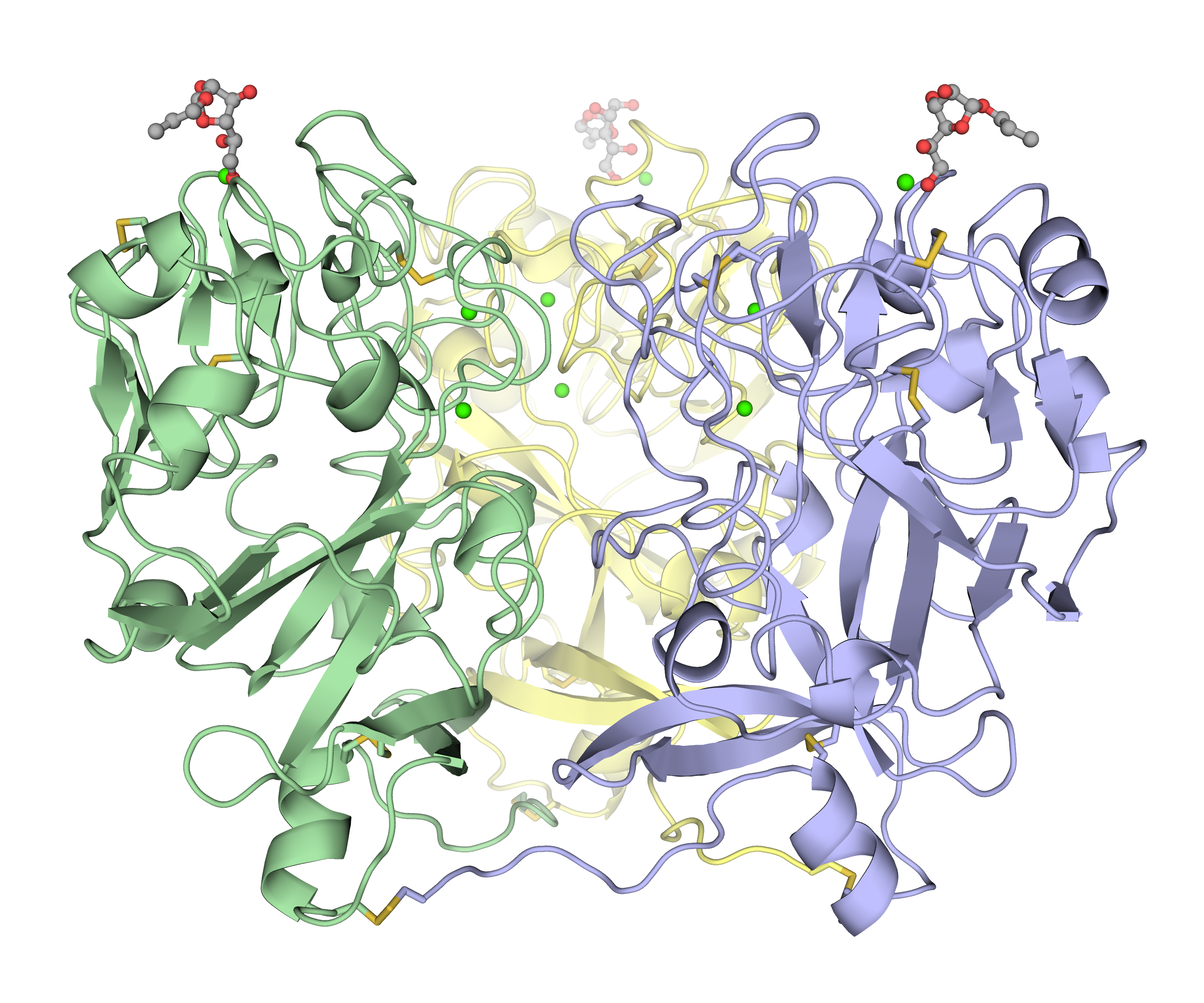
Disulfide-linked trimeric human intelectin-1

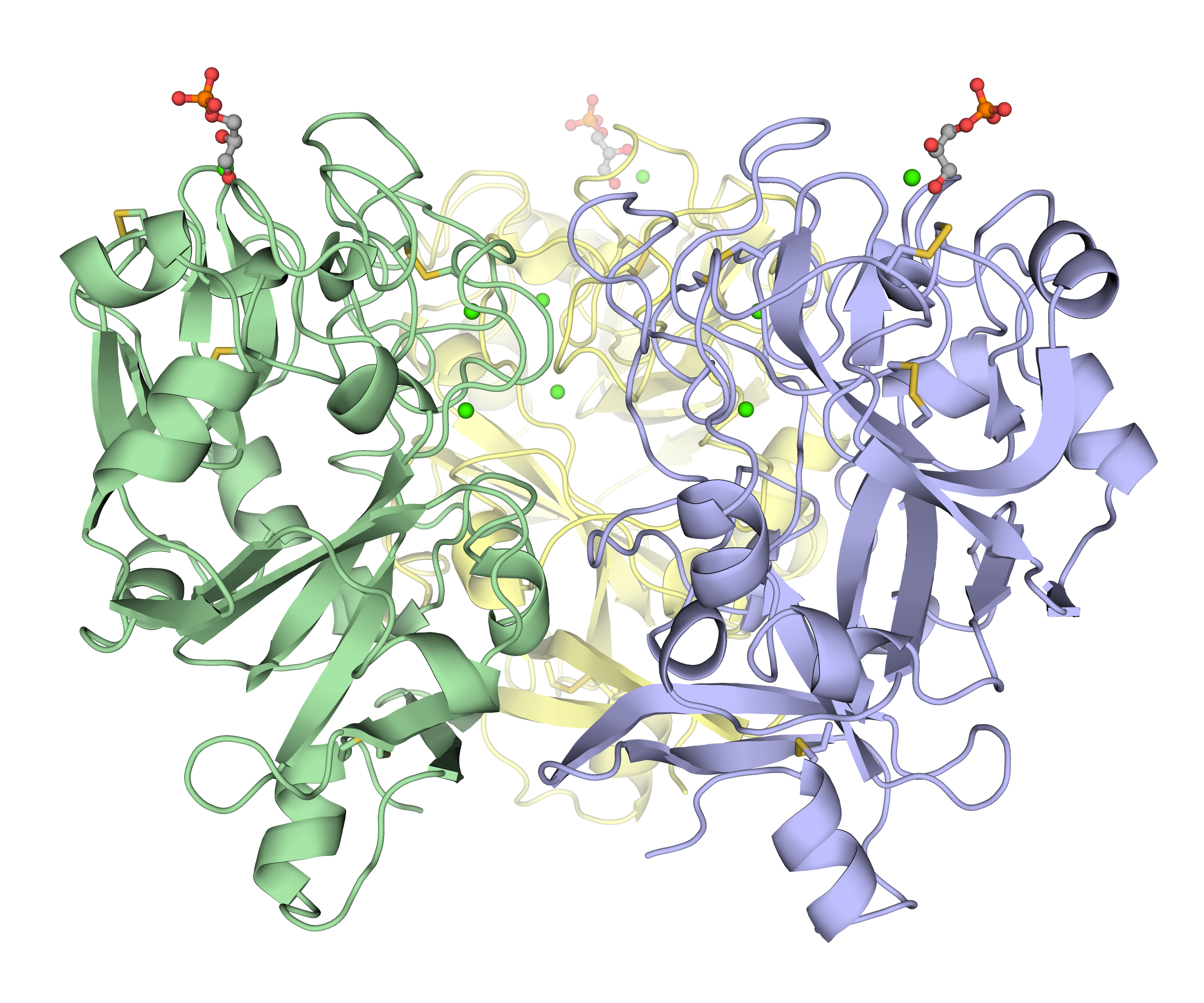
Trimeric Xenopus embryonic epidermal lectin carbohydrate-recognition domain (XEEL-CRD). Extensive biophysical investigations conclusively indicate that XEEL-CRD is trimeric in solution despite lacking the intermolecular disulfide bonds found in hIntL-1.
