= Libba =

Type of Yemeni cheese

Libba', Laba (Arabic: اللباء) is a type of Yemeni cheese. It is mostly eaten in rural areas of Yemen and Somalia as well. The libba is not sold as a product or in restaurants.

== Etymology ==
The word libba means colostrum in Arabic.

== Preparation ==
=== Traditional way ===
After a cow or a goat give birth, her milk is taken and boiled in a tannour. Shathab (ruta graveolens), nigella sativa seeds, salt and smoked ghee (Samn makbi) are added to the milk while it is boiling.

=== Modern way ===
Yemeni people in the cities who don't have goats or cows prepare the libba using ingredients including eggs as well as milk.
