= Animal heme-dependent peroxidases =

Animal heme-dependent peroxidase
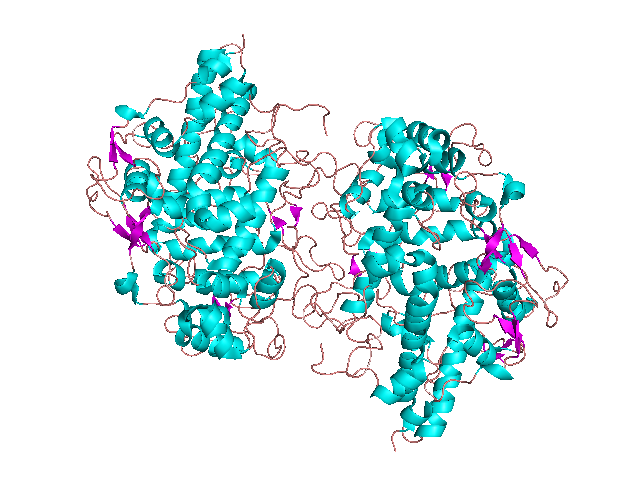
- Crystal structure of the human myeloperoxidase-thiocyanate complex.

Identifiers
- Symbol: An_peroxidase
- Pfam: PF03098
- InterPro: IPR019791
- PROSITE: PDOC00394
- SCOP2: 1mhl / SCOPe / SUPFAM
- OPM superfamily: 36
- OPM protein: 1q4g
- CDD: cd05396
Available protein structures:
- PDB: IPR019791 PF03098 (ECOD; PDBsum)
- AlphaFold: IPR019791; PF03098

Animal heme-dependent peroxidases are a family of peroxidases. Peroxidases are found in bacteria, fungi, plants and animals. On the basis of sequence similarity, a number of animal heme peroxidases can be categorized as members of a superfamily: myeloperoxidase (MPO); eosinophil peroxidase (EPO); lactoperoxidase (LPO); thyroid peroxidase (TPO); prostaglandin H synthase (PGHS); and peroxidasin.

== Function ==
Myeloperoxidase (MPO) plays a major role in the oxygen-dependent microbicidal system of neutrophils. EPO from eosinophilic granulocytes participates in immunological reactions, and potentiates tumor necrosis factor (TNF) production and hydrogen peroxide release by human monocyte-derived macrophages. MPO (and possibly EPO) primarily use Cl^{−}ions and H_{2}O_{2} to form hypochlorous acid (HOCl), which can effectively kill bacteria or parasites. In secreted fluids, LPO catalyses the oxidation of thiocyanate ions (SCN^{−}) by H_{2}O_{2}, producing the weak oxidizing agent hypothiocyanite (OSCN^{−}), which has bacteriostatic activity. TPO uses I^{−} ions and H_{2}O_{2} to generate iodine, and plays a central role in the biosynthesis of thyroid hormones T_{3} and T_{4}. Myeloperoxidase (PDB: 1dnu), for example, resides in the human nucleus and lysosome and acts as a defense response to oxidative stress, preventing apoptosis of the cell.

== Structure ==
3D structures of MPO and PGHS have been reported. MPO is a homodimer: each monomer consists of a light (A or B) and a heavy (C or D) chain resulting from post-translational excision of 6 residues from the common precursor. Monomers are linked by a single inter-chain disulfide. Each monomer includes a bound calcium ion. PGHS exists as a symmetric homodimer, each monomer of which consists of 3 domains: an N-terminal epidermal growth factor (EGF) like module; a membrane-binding domain; and a large C-terminal catalytic domain containing the cyclooxygenase and the peroxidase active sites. The catalytic domain shows striking structural similarity to MPO. The image at the top of this page is an example of Myeloperoxidase 1dnu derived from X-ray diffraction with resolution 1.85 angstrom.

== Active site ==
The cyclooxygenase active site, which catalyzes the formation of prostaglandin G2 (PGG2) from arachidonic acid, resides at the apex of a long hydrophobic channel, extending from the membrane-binding domain to the center of the molecule. The peroxidase active site, which catalyzes the reduction of PGG2 to PGH2, is located on the other side of the molecule, at the heme binding site. Both MPO and the catalytic domain of PGHS are mainly alpha-helical, 19 helices being identified as topologically and spatially equivalent; PGHS contains 5 additional N-terminal helices that have no equivalent in MPO. In both proteins, three Asn residues in each monomer are glycosylated.

== Human proteins containing this domain ==
The following is a list of human proteins containing this domain:

DUOX1; DUOX2; EPX; LPO; MPO; PTGS1; PTGS2; PXDNL; TPO
