= Intelectin-2 =

Protein found in humans

ITLN2

Identifiers
- Aliases: ITLN2, HL-2, HL2, intelectin 2
- External IDs: OMIM: 609874; GeneCards: ITLN2

Gene location (Human)
Chr.	Chromosome 1 (human)
Band	1q23.3	Start	160,945,025 bp
Band	1q23.3	End	160,954,809 bp
RNA expression pattern
Bgee	Human / Mouse (ortholog); Top expressed in: duodenum; right lung; upper lobe of left lung; right coronary artery; gonad; left coronary artery; left ovary; right ovary; right auricle of heart; rectum / n/a; More reference expression data
BioGPS	n/a
Orthologs
Databases	NCBI: entry; OMA: entry
Species	Human	Mouse
Entrez	142683	n/a
Ensembl	ENSG00000158764	n/a
UniProt	Q8WWU7	n/a
RefSeq (mRNA)	NM_080878	n/a
RefSeq (protein)	NP_543154	n/a
Location (UCSC)	Chr 1: 160.95 – 160.95 Mb	n/a
PubMed search		n/a
- Wikidata
View/Edit Human

Intelectin 2 is a protein that in humans is encoded by the ITLN2 gene.

Human intelectin-2 has non-conserved ligand binding site substitutions compared to human intelectin-1, thus these two intelectins may not have the same metal ion requirements and ligand specificity. Likewise, there are also ligand binding site residue variations between human and mouse intelectin-2 with no known biochemical and functional consequences.

== See also ==
- Intelectin
