= Colostrum =

Form of milk produced immediately following the delivery of newborn

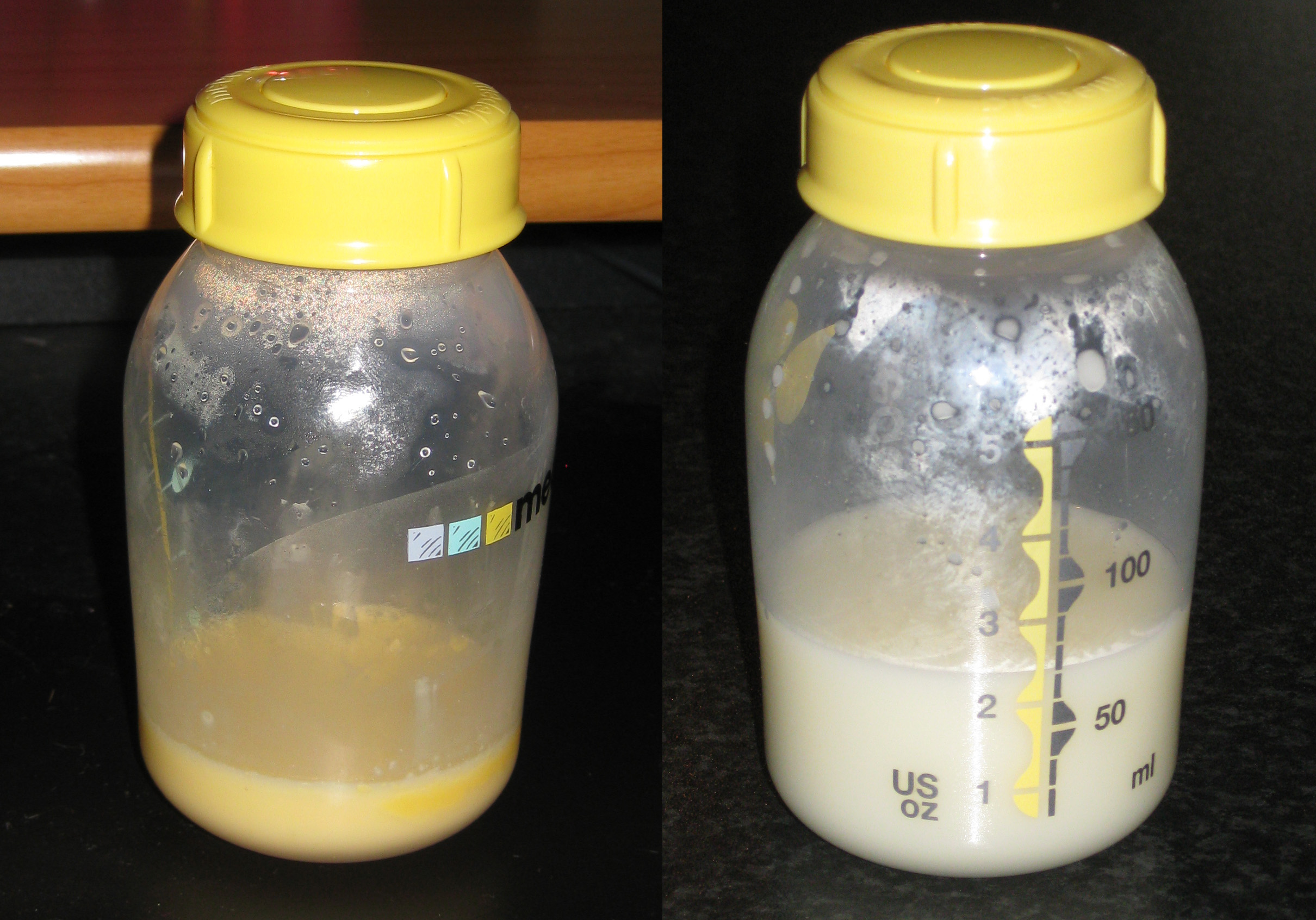
On the left is human breast milk expressed on day 4 of lactation, and on the right is breast milk expressed on day 8. Colostrum has a yellowish hue.

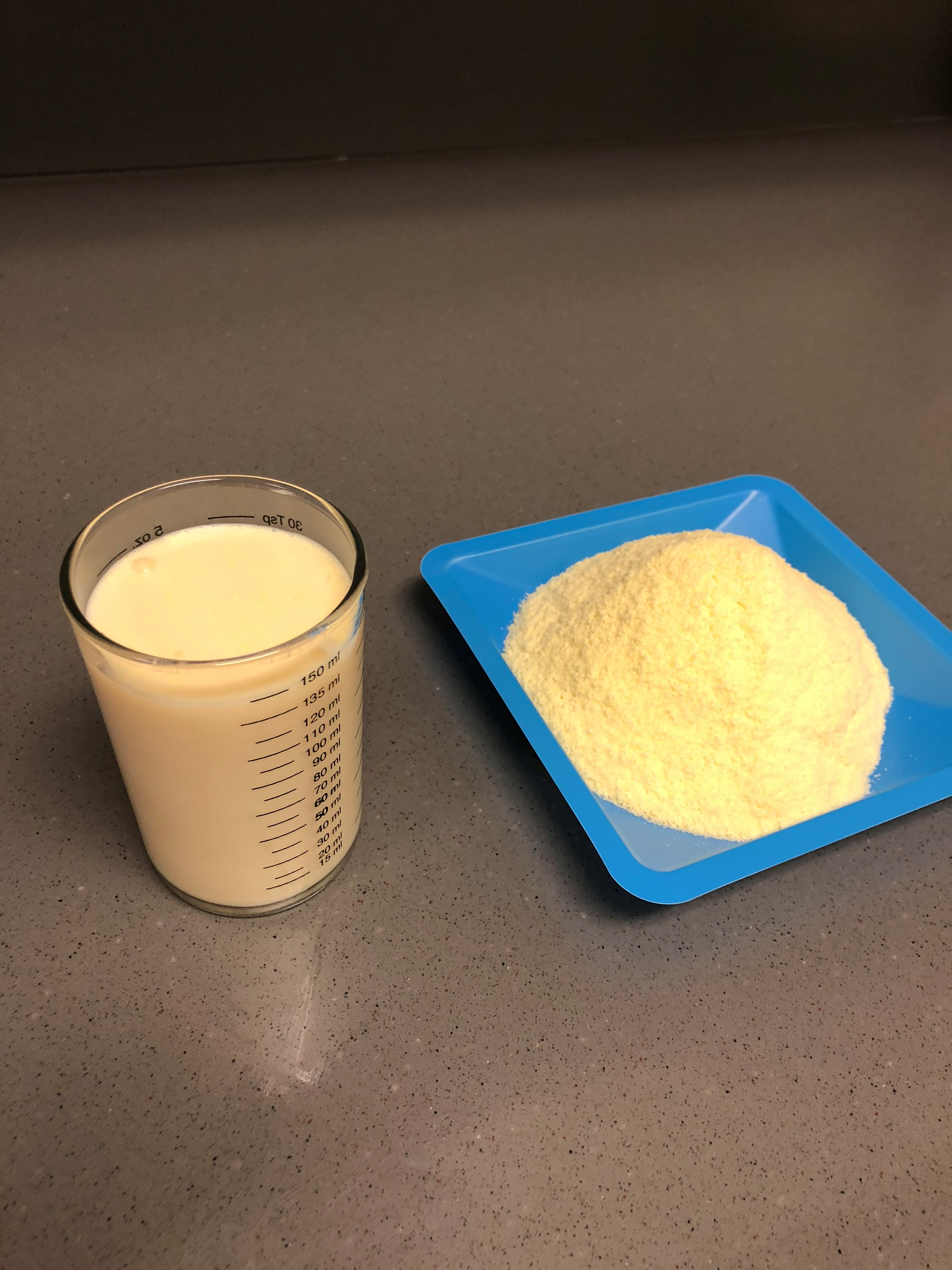
Bovine colostrum (beestings) next to spray-dried colostrum powder

Colostrum (from Latin, of unknown origin), also known as foremilk, is the milk expressed by the mammary glands of a female mammal during the first few days following delivery of the newborn. Animal colostrum may be called beestings, the traditional word from Old English dialects.

Most species begin to generate colostrum just prior to giving birth. Colostrum contains antibodies to protect the newborn against infection, and immune and growth factors. Colostrum is beneficial for a newborn's growth and immune system in calves and humans.

At birth, the newborn moves from the sterile conditions of the uterus, with a constant nutrient supply via the placenta, to the microbe-rich environment outside, with irregular oral intake of complex milk nutrients through the gastrointestinal tract. This transition puts high demands on the neonate's gastrointestinal tract, which plays an important part in the immune system.

Colostrum contributes to the newborn's initial humoral immunity in calves and humans, and contributes to the growth, development, and maturation of the gastrointestinal tract in calves. Colostrum also has a mild laxative effect, encouraging the passing of a baby's first stool, which is called meconium. This clears excess bilirubin, a waste product of dead red blood cells which is produced in large quantities at birth due to blood volume reduction from the infant's body, and which is often responsible for jaundice.

The importance of colostrum for prevention of infection varies by species. While human infants can be raised on milk substitutes or normal ruminant milk, protected for 6 to 12 months by antibodies from the mother that entered the fetus's bloodstream via the placenta, colostrum intake is crucial for newborn ruminants (cattle, sheep, goats, etc.) Calves denied colostrum almost universally die due to bacterial infection.

Research on possible health benefits and medical applications of bovine colostrum is ongoing. Currently, there is no accepted medical use of bovine colostrum to treat any condition in humans.

== Composition ==
Colostrum, like other forms of milk, is mostly water, and also contains lactose, fat, minerals and protein. It also contains antibodies to protect the newborn against disease and infection, and immune and growth factors. Colostrum contains white blood cells.

Newborns have immature and small digestive systems, and colostrum delivers beneficial compounds in a concentrated low-volume form. Colostrum contains immune cells (lymphocytes) and antibodies such as IgA, IgG, and IgM. These are some of the components of the adaptive immune system. Other immune components of colostrum include major components of the innate immune system, such as lactoferrin, lysozyme, lactoperoxidase, complement, and proline-rich polypeptides (PRP). Cytokines (small messenger peptides that control the functioning of the immune system) are found in colostrum as well, such as tumor necrosis factor.

Colostrum also contains growth factors, such as insulin-like growth factor I (IGF-1), and II, transforming growth factor alpha, beta 1 and beta 2, fibroblast growth factors, epidermal growth factor, granulocyte-macrophage-stimulating growth factor, platelet-derived growth factor, vascular endothelial growth factor, and colony-stimulating factor 1.

=== Proline-rich polypeptides ===
Proline-rich polypeptides (PRPs) are small immune signaling peptides that were independently discovered in colostrum and other sources, such as blood plasma, in the United States, Czechoslovakia and Poland. Hence they appear under various names in the literature, including Colostrinin, CLN, transfer factor and PRP. They function as signal transducing molecules that accelerate the maturation of cells of the immune system.

== Human colostrum ==
In humans, colostrum is produced from around the 28th week of pregnancy and can be excreted around the 36th week. The antibodies in colostrum protect infants from infection and colostrum is hypothesized to have anti-inflammatory properties.

It is suggested infants fed with human colostrum have lower incidence of gastrointestinal infections. Colostrum has a laxative effect, encouraging the baby's body to excrete stool, which helps eliminate excess bilirubin, although jaundice lasts longer in infants who breastfeed poorly compared to those who are formula-fed with optimal doses.

== Bovine colostrum ==
Bovine colostrum has been the subject of numerous studies regarding its composition and its effect on calves.

Upon exposure to pathogens, dairy cattle produce antibodies against the pathogens. These antibodies are present in the cow's bloodstream and colostrum. Some of these antibodies are specific to bacteria which cause infections in humans, including Escherichia coli, Cryptosporidium parvum, Shigella flexneri, Salmonella species, Staphylococcus species, and rotavirus (which causes diarrhea in infants). Albert Sabin, who developed the first oral vaccine against polio, used colostrum in an experiment to evaluate the protective effect of breastfeeding against the poliomyelitis virus.

Sabin obtained blood serum and milk samples from 30 human nursing mothers at different times after delivery. He then mixed the serum and blood from each individual mother together, in systematically differing proportions, and added "a constant amount" of the Lansing strain of the poliomyelitis virus. The mixtures were then injected into the brains of mice.

The results showed that 100% of the human colostrum samples had antipoliomyelitic activity whereas only "80 per cent of the milk specimens obtained between 101 and 340 days after delivery" had such activity. He also tested cow's milk (not specified as colostrum) and found that milk samples from 2 of 9 cows contained antipoliomyelitic activity. When antibiotics began to appear, interest in colostrum waned, but after antibiotic-resistant strains of pathogens developed, interest turned to colostrum as a natural alternative to antibiotics.

=== Health effects of consumption by humans ===
Bovine colostrum and human colostrum contain many of the same antibodies, immune and growth factors, and nutrients.

Bovine colostrum powder is high in protein and low in sugar and fat. Bovine colostrum reduces the acute increase in intestinal permeability induced by a non-steroidal anti-inflammatory drug in adult human males. Bovine colostrum has also been studied as a potential treatment for nonorganic failure to thrive in children

There is also research suggesting that a large proportion of bovine colostrum is not fit for human consumption "due to tremendous bacterial loads". Salmonella was detected in 15% of unpasteurised samples. Pasteurisation of colostrum inactivates antibodies.

==== Respiratory system ====
Some studies suggest that colostrum may reduce the risk of respiratory infections and alleviate allergy symptoms in humans. One study of human subjects suggested that oral colostrum was effective in preventing influenza. Bovine colostrum was shown to reduce symptoms of allergic rhinitis in children.

==== Digestive system ====
Colostrum may reduce intestinal permeability and improve nutrient absorption, while its prebiotics feed beneficial gut bacteria in adults and children.

==== Older children ====
Colostrum may have continued benefits in children over the age of one: to support children's immune systems, soothe digestive upsets, and otherwise support digestive health. Some say that bovine colostrum is only suitable for cows because the antibodies in it are mainly for cow diseases, with only a portion being common to humans. In addition, bovine colostrum contains growth factors. Specifically, it contains prolactin and growth hormone.

==== Sports nutrition ====
Bovine colostrum may help maintain a healthy immune system during athletic training, while supporting cellular proliferation as well as protein synthesis and soft tissue repair. One study showed that one brand of concentrated bovine colostrum powder improved running performance in one test, on average, in thirty males but did not improve performance in another test.

==== Skin ====
Bovine colostrum (BC) affects skin. A study conducted in 2021 by Jogi Reena et al. found that bovine colostrum may help delay skin aging by reducing telomere shortening, which is a marker of cellular aging. The researchers attributed these benefits to the antioxidant properties of BC, which help maintain telomere length and boost fibroblast proliferation—a key element in collagen production and the maintenance of skin structure.

A study argues that BC stimulates fibroblast activity, aiding in the repair of damaged skin and the creation of new tissue, making it effective for wound healing and scar reduction. A 2024 study argued that topically applied BC to an ulcer improved the Bates-Jensen Wound Assessment score of chronic non-healing ulcers on day 21 of treatment, due to the immunoglobulins and lactoferrin in it.

==== Hyperimmune bovine colostrum ====
Hyperimmune colostrum is natural bovine colostrum collected from a population of cows immunized repeatedly with a specific pathogen. The colostrum is collected within 24 hours of the cow giving birth. Antibodies towards the specific pathogens or antigens that were used in the immunization are present in higher levels than in the population before treatment. Although some papers have been published stating that specific human pathogens were just as high as in hyperimmune colostrum, and natural colostrum nearly always had higher antibody titers than did the hyperimmune version.

A 2011 clinical trial showed that if the immunization is by surface antigens of a strain of E. coli bacteria, the Bovine Colostrum Powder can be used to make tablets capable of binding to the bacteria so that they are excreted in stools, thus preventing diarrhea that is caused by this strain of E. coli. This prevents the successful colonization of the gut, which would otherwise lead to bacteria releasing enterotoxigenic materials which cause diarrhea.

=== Use in animal husbandry ===
Colostrum is beneficial for newborn farm animals. They receive no passive transfer of immunity via the placenta before birth, so any antibodies that they need have to be either ingested or supplied by injection or other artificial means. The ingested antibodies are absorbed from the intestine of the neonate. Maximum absorption of colostral antibodies by the newborn animal occurs within 4 hours or thirty minutes of birth.

The role of colostrum for newborn animals is to provide nutrition, and protect against infection while the immune and digestive systems are developing and maturing. Bovine colostrum provides macro- and micro-nutrients, as well as growth factors, cytokines, nucleosides, oligosaccharides, natural antimicrobials, antioxidants; and a range of immunoglobulins such as IgG, IgA, IgD, IgM and IgE. Minimal levels of IgG are essential to prevent failure of passive transfer.

The iron-binding glycoproteins lactoferrin and transferrin in bovine colostrum assist in attacking pathogens by impacting their cell membrane and making them more susceptible to the immune systems attack by neutrophils. Cytokines in bovine colostrum enhance B and T cell maturation and increase endogenous antibody production. They also help regulate epithelial cell growth and development, proliferation, and restitution. Transfer factors enhance the activity of T cells. Other growth and immune factors such as IGF-1, IGF-2, FGF, EGF, TGF, PDGF, etc.

Bovine colostrum supports immunity and gut health in calves. Early, high-quality colostrum is beneficial for survival and healthy development. It repairs intestinal damage and improves nutrient absorption. In calves, colostrum helps develop their gut and prevents death. It reduces infections, antibiotic use, and diarrhea, leading to faster growth.

=== Potential applications ===
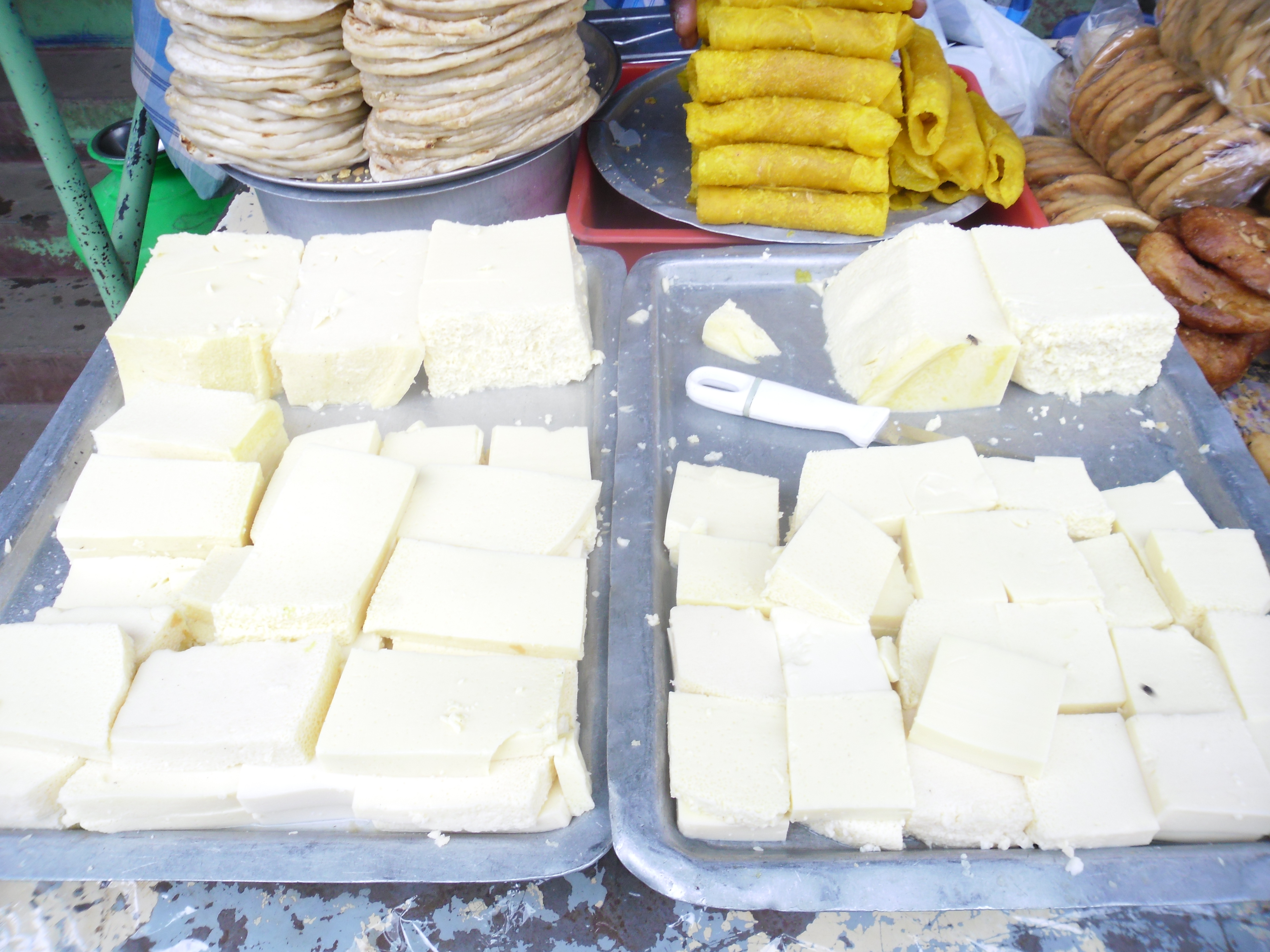
Solidified colostrum in a sweet stall, Salem, Tamil Nadu

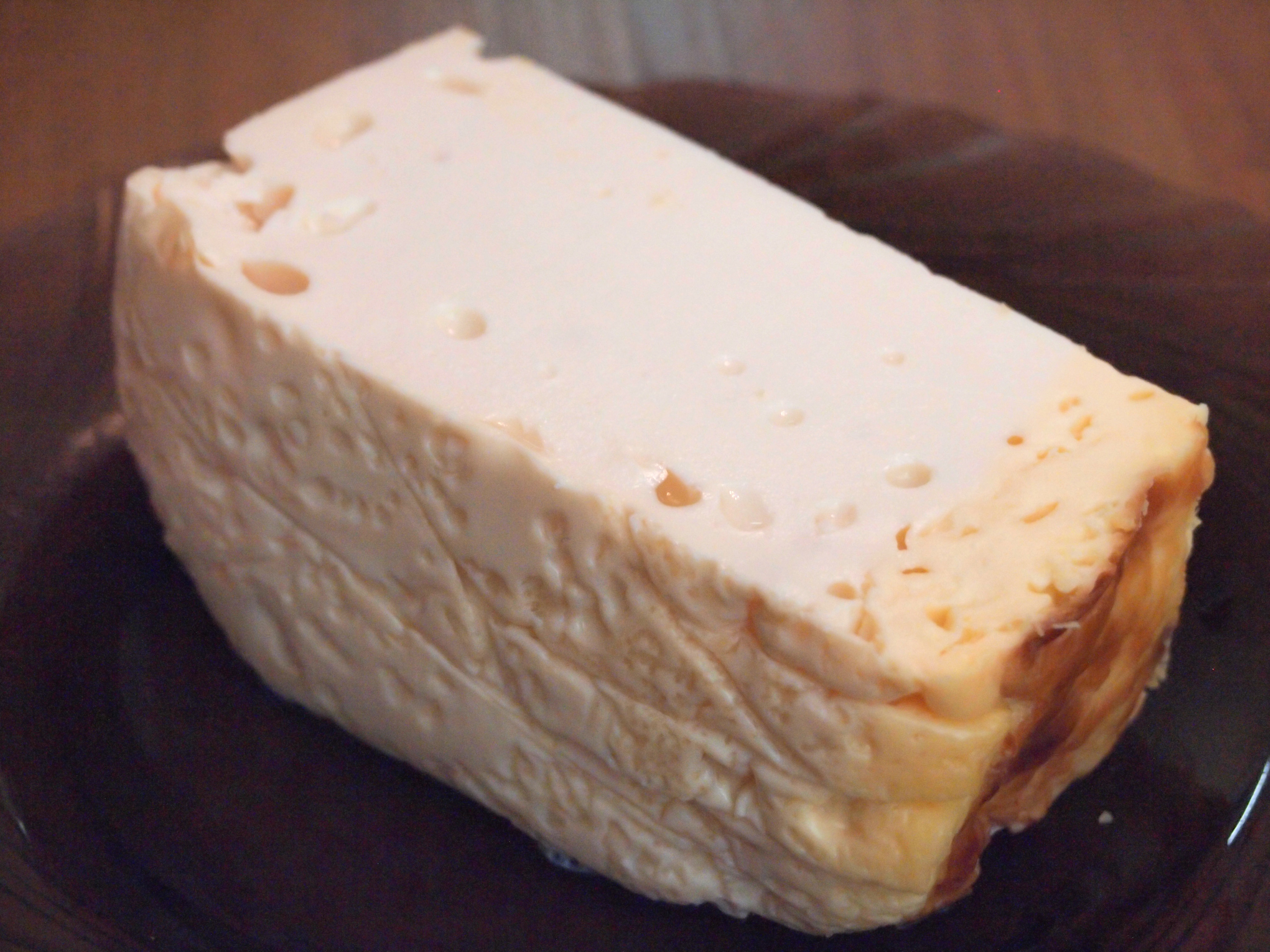
Molozyvo—a traditional dish of Ukrainian cuisine. It is a sweet cheese made of cow colostrum.

Although bovine colostrum has been consumed by humans for centuries, only in recent decades have we seen randomized clinical trials to test for health benefits. It is probable that little absorption of intact growth factors and antibodies into the bloodstream occurs, due to digestion in the gastrointestinal tract. However, two experiments, one using human pancreatic fluid and one using rats, suggested the presence of casein and other buffering proteins allows epidermal growth factor but not transforming growth factor α to survive degradation induced by human pancreatic fluid and allows epidermal growth factor to pass into the lumen of the small intestine in rats, where it can stimulate repair, working via local effects.

This provides a probable mechanism explaining reductions in gut permeability after colostrum administration in some published studies, while another study found colostrum promising as treatment for distal colitis. The effect of colostrum on extra-gastrointestinal problems has been studied in a small number of randomised double-blind studies.

The gut can be affected by ulcers, inflammation, and infectious diarrhea. There is currently much interest in the potential value of colostrum for the prevention and treatment of these conditions., As pointed out by Kelly, inconsistency between results in some published studies may be due in part to variation in dose given and to the timing of the colostrum collection being tested (first milking versus pooled colostrum collected up to day 5 following calving).

Some athletes have used colostrum in an attempt to improve their performance, decrease recovery time, and prevent sickness during peak performance levels. Supplementation with bovine colostrum, 20 grams per day (g/d), in combination with exercise training for eight weeks may increase bone-free lean body mass in active men and women.

Low IGF-1 levels may be associated with dementia in the very elderly, although causation has not been established. Malnutrition can cause low levels of IGF-1, as can obesity. Although IGF-1 is not absorbed intact by the body, some studies suggest it stimulates the production of IGF-1 when taken as a supplement whereas others do not.

Colostrum has antioxidant components, such as lactoferrin and hemopexin, which binds free heme in the body.

The Isle of Man had a local delicacy called "Groosniuys", a pudding made with colostrum.

In Finland, a baked cheese called Leipäjuusto is traditionally made with either cow colostrum or reindeer milk.

A sweet cheese-like delicacy called 'Junnu' or 'Ginnu' is made with colostrum in the south Indian states of Karnataka, Andhra Pradesh and Telangana. It is made with both cow and buffalo milk; in both cases milk produced on the second day after birth is considered ideal for preparing this pudding-like delicacy. Due to the combination of high demand and limited supply of colostrum, many products are adulterated with standard milk.

A 2024 study concluded that for obtain the maximum health benefits, it is: "recommend collecting and processing the colostrum of primiparous cows and immature milk at the end of the milk transition separately."
