= Colostrinin =

Colostrinin (also known as CLN, proline-rich polypeptides or PRP) is a mixture of proline-rich polypeptides extracted from colostrum from sheep and cows.

== Early work on Colostrinin ==
Colostrinin was originally identified by scientists working in Poland in the 1970s. Colostrinin is derived from colostrum, which is present in the pre-milk fluid produced from mammary glands in the first few days after parturition. It is also known as proline-rich polypeptides, since sequence analysis of the peptides present in this mixture reveals an unusually high proportion of this amino acid residue. The amino acid compositions of the extracts from ovine, bovine, and human colostrum are very similar. Colostrinin was first characterized in animal and in-vitro studies as a substance that generally stimulates the immune response.

== Preparation and synthesis ==
Colostrinin is obtained from bovine colostrum by alcohol extraction and filtration by a patented method. Colostrinin largely consists of a mixture of at least 32 peptides ranging in size from 0.5 to 3 kDa. Most of the peptides appear to be derived from proteolytic processing of the milk proteins β-casein and a β-casein homolog.

== Potential Health benefits ==
PRP-rich preparations from bovine colostrum have shown possible efficacy against various illnesses including neurodegenerative diseases (such as Alzheimer's), viral infections, and ailments characterized by an overactive immune system, such as allergies, asthma and autoimmune diseases. Some recent research has also indicated possible efficacy in combating obesity.

=== Allergy ===
A study published online in March 2008 showed that Colostrinin is non-allergenic and can prevent allergic inflammation due to common indoor and outdoor allergens. The study used a well characterized mouse model of allergic airway inflammation. Colostrinin (given orally, intranasally or intraperitoneally) significantly decreased IgE/IgG1 production, airway eosinophilia, mucin production and hypersensitivity induced by allergenic extracts from ragweed pollen and house dust mites. In contrast, colostrum induced positive inflammatory responses.

=== Cognition and dementia ===
Colostrinin has possible efficacy in Alzheimer's disease and as a cognitive enhancer.

A placebo-controlled clinical trial with Colostrinin in 106 people with Alzheimer's over 30 weeks was completed in 2002 and the results appeared to demonstrate efficacy in a significant proportion of patients treated. The results showed that approximately 40% of patients on Colostrinin were stabilized or improved after 15 weeks of therapy, based on an Analysis of Overall Response. 33% of patients continued to show stabilization or improvement after 30 weeks of treatment, although levels of benefit were slightly higher at the 15-week stage of the trial. The dosage regimen used for the trial was 100 micrograms of Colostrinin administered every second day for three weeks followed by a two-week period without Colostrinin.

A 2010 study demonstrated that Colostrinin significantly relieved amyloid-beta (Aß)-induced cytotoxicity, alleviated the effect of Aß-induced cytotoxicity and caused a significant reduction in the elevated levels of the antioxidant enzyme SOD1.

Another study showed that Colostrinin induces neurite outgrowth of pheochromocytoma cells and inhibits beta amyloid-induced apoptosis.

There were also studies of the Colostrinin components and their possible effect on aggregation of amyloid beta (Abeta1-42). Results presented suggest that NP - Colostrinin component, can directly interact with amyloid beta, inhibit its aggregation and disrupt existing aggregates acting as a beta sheet breaker and reduce toxicity induced by aggregated forms of Abeta.

Another study in day-old domestic chicks showed enhancement of long-term memory retention.

A randomized, double-blind, placebo-controlled trial from 2023 showed that daily use of Colostrinin improved scores on 2 of 5 cognitive tests in adults of various ages in Poland over a 4-month period.

=== Anti-aging potential ===
Colostrinin affects the early stages of Vitamin D3-induced phenotypic (CD11b and CD14) and functional (phagocytic) differentiation/maturation of monocytes/macrophages. When Colostrinin was administered to the cells after treatment with Vitamin D3, no attenuation of the differentiation/maturation process of the HL-60 cells was observed.

An in-vitro study completed in 2005 showed that Colostrinin can increase the lifespan of cells isolated from inbred mice predisposed to premature aging and death.

A 2006 study published in the Journal of Experimental Therapeutics and Oncology indicated that Colostrin reduces the mutation frequency in the DNA of cells. Such DNA damage is implicated in the general process of aging. The study, which was performed in both hamster and human cells, looked at the effect of Colostrinin on the frequency of defined DNA mutations in these cells as they occur naturally and when induced by various known chemical or physical agents. In cells stressed oxidatively, Colostrinin reduced the frequency of mutation induced by reactive oxygen species (ROS) to nearly background levels in a dose-dependent manner. Likewise, Colostrinin reduced the frequency of mutation caused by two mutagenic agents, methyl methane sulfonate and mitomycin-C, the latter often used in cancer chemotherapy. Notably Colostrinin decreased UVA and UVB radiation induced mutation frequency. These damaging radiations are a natural part of sunlight. UVA radiation plays a role in the induction of melanoma and UVB radiation is the primary cause of squamous cell carcinomas. It is suggested that the antimutagenic properties of Colostrinin are achieved via multiple mechanisms - by decreasing intracellular levels of ROS and so preventing DNA damage and by increasing the efficiency of natural DNA repair mechanisms.

== Toxicity ==
There has been very little mention of toxicity in most published animal studies using Colostrinin, which may suggest that it exhibits low toxicity. Generally, treatment with Colostrinin in clinical studies has been well tolerated by both animals and humans, with any side-effects being mild and transient.

== Use by humans ==
Tablets or capsules containing Colostrinin are available in many countries in the world and are sold as an OTC dietary supplement under various trade names.
