= Intelectin-1 =

Protein found in humans

ITLN1
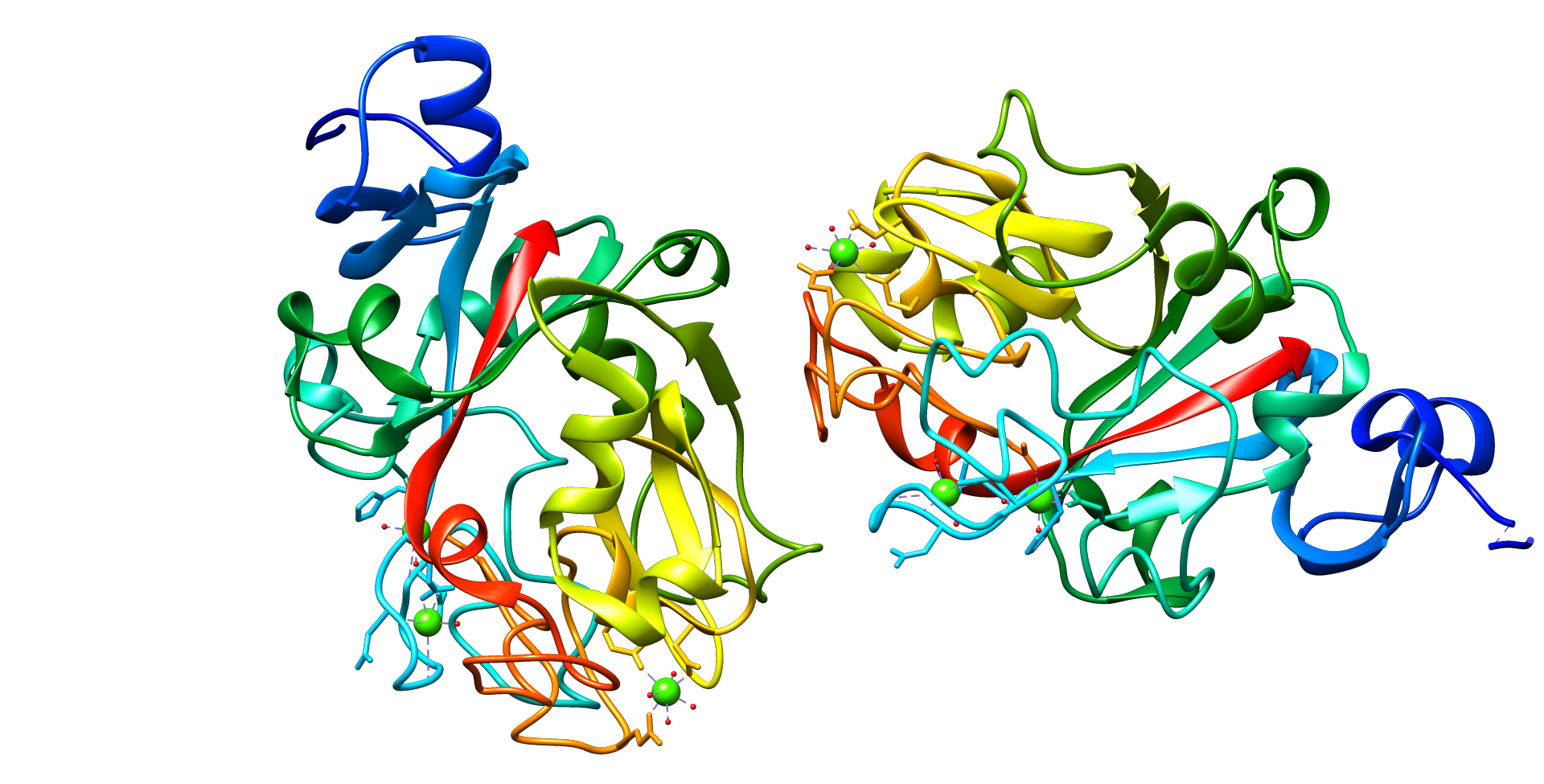

Identifiers
- Aliases: ITLN1, HL-1, HL1, INTL, ITLN, LFR, hIntL, omentin, intelectin 1
- External IDs: OMIM: 609873; MGI: 1333831; GeneCards: ITLN1
Available structures
PDB	Ortholog search: PDBe RCSB
PDB	List of PDB id codes 4WMQ, 4WMY

Gene location (Human)
Chr.	Chromosome 1 (human)
Band	1q23.3	Start	160,876,540 bp
Band	1q23.3	End	160,885,180 bp

Gene location (Mouse)
Chr.	Chromosome 1 (mouse)
Band	1|1 H3	Start	171,345,690 bp
Band	1|1 H3	End	171,362,862 bp
RNA expression pattern
Bgee	Human / Mouse (ortholog); Top expressed in: parietal pleura; mucosa of ileum; pericardium; mucosa of sigmoid colon; germinal epithelium; rectum; mucosa of transverse colon; jejunal mucosa; cardiac muscle tissue of right atrium; duodenum / Top expressed in: crypt of lieberkuhn of small intestine; Paneth cell; duodenum; jejunum; intestinal villus; ileum; Ileal epithelium; cervix; embryo; left colon; More reference expression data
BioGPS	n/a
Gene ontology
Molecular function	carbohydrate binding; calcium ion binding; oligosaccharide binding; metal ion binding; identical protein binding
Cellular component	membrane raft; anchored component of membrane; brush border membrane; receptor complex; plasma membrane; extracellular exosome; membrane; extracellular region
Biological process	positive regulation of glucose import; positive regulation of protein phosphorylation; response to nematode; antimicrobial humoral response; protein homotrimerization
Sources:Amigo / QuickGO
Orthologs
Databases	NCBI: entry; OMA: entry
Species	Human	Mouse
Entrez	55600	16429
Ensembl	ENSG00000179914	ENSMUSG00000038209
UniProt	Q8WWA0	O88310
RefSeq (mRNA)	NM_017625	NM_010584
RefSeq (protein)	NP_060095	NP_034714
Location (UCSC)	Chr 1: 160.88 – 160.89 Mb	Chr 1: 171.35 – 171.36 Mb
PubMed search
- Wikidata
View/Edit Human	View/Edit Mouse

Intelectin-1, also known as omentin or intestinal lactoferrin receptor, is an intelectin encoded in humans by the ITLN1 gene. Intelectin-1 is a secreted protein that can bind to bacterial arabinogalactans. It may also interact with lactoferrin and increase its cellular uptake.

Having conserved ligand binding site residues, both human and mouse intelectin-1 bind the exocyclic vicinal diol of carbohydrate ligands such as galactofuranose.

== See also ==
- Intelectin
