= Lactoperoxidase =

Mammalian protein found in Homo sapiens

LPO
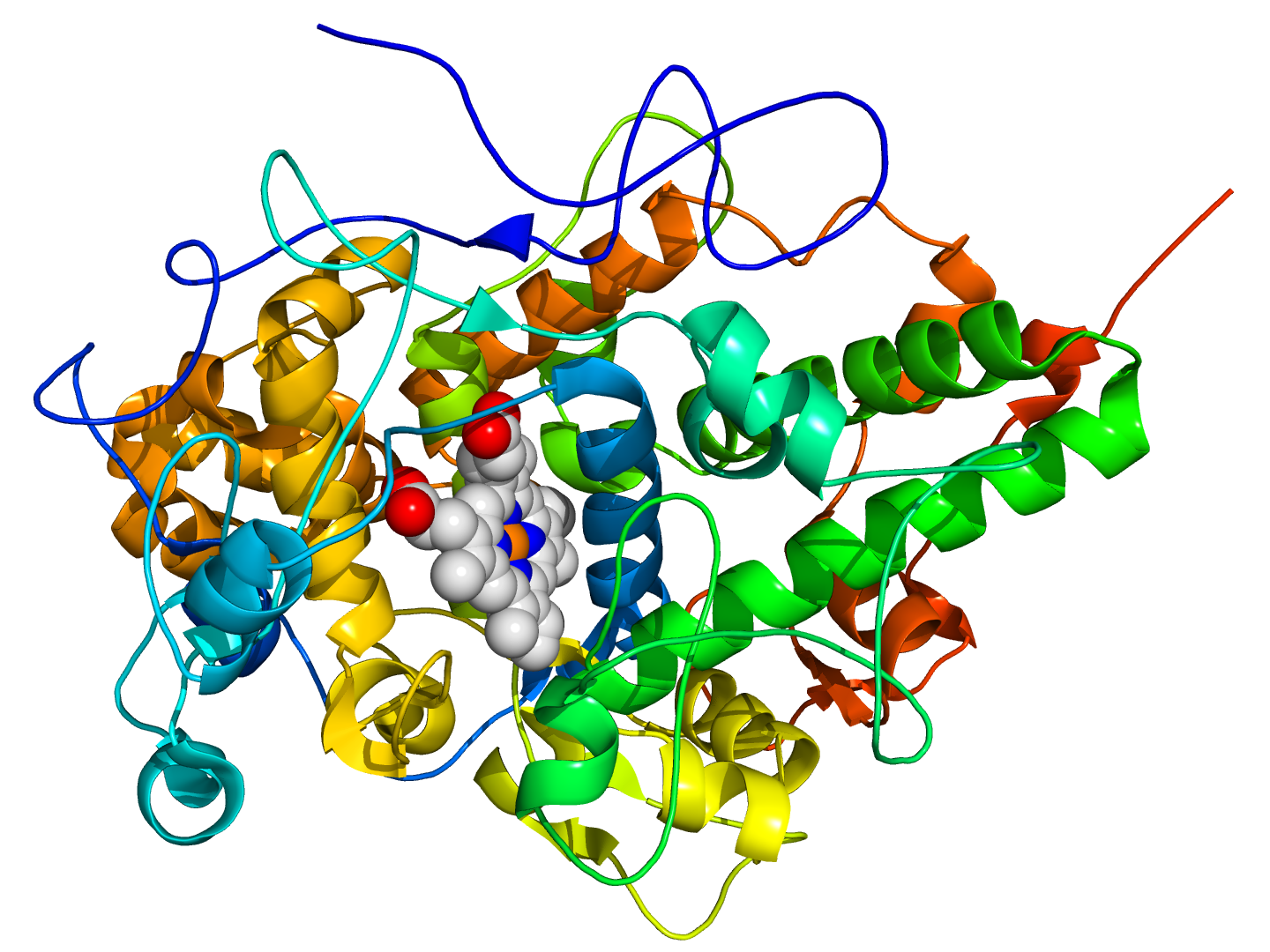

Identifiers
- Aliases: LPO, SPO, lactoperoxidase
- External IDs: OMIM: 150205; MGI: 1923363; GeneCards: LPO
Enzyme activity
EC #	BRENDA	ExPASy	KEGG	MetaCyc
1.11.1.7	↗	↗	↗	↗

Gene location (Human)
Chr.	Chromosome 17 (human)
Band	17q22	Start	58,218,548 bp
Band	17q22	End	58,268,518 bp

Gene location (Mouse)
Chr.	Chromosome 11 (mouse)
Band	11|11 C	Start	87,697,254 bp
Band	11|11 C	End	87,719,115 bp
RNA expression pattern
Bgee	Human / Mouse (ortholog); Top expressed in: parotid gland; olfactory zone of nasal mucosa; trachea; minor salivary glands; gonad; bone marrow cell; gums; mucosa of pharynx; substantia nigra; superior surface of tongue / Top expressed in: parotid gland; lacrimal gland; submandibular gland; seminal vesicula; embryo; seminiferous tubule; cervix; temporal muscle; embryo; vestibular membrane of cochlear duct; More reference expression data
BioGPS	n/a
Gene ontology
Molecular function	thiocyanate peroxidase activity; oxidoreductase activity; heme binding; metal ion binding; peroxidase activity
Cellular component	extracellular region; basolateral plasma membrane; extracellular exosome; extracellular space; cytoplasm
Biological process	cellular oxidant detoxification; defense response to bacterium; detection of chemical stimulus involved in sensory perception of bitter taste; response to oxidative stress; hydrogen peroxide catabolic process; thiocyanate metabolic process; cell redox homeostasis
Sources:Amigo / QuickGO
Orthologs
Databases	NCBI: entry; OMA: entry
Species	Human	Mouse
Entrez	4025	76113
Ensembl	ENSG00000167419	ENSMUSG00000009356
UniProt	P22079	n/a
RefSeq (mRNA)	NM_001160102; NM_006151	NM_080420
RefSeq (protein)	NP_001153574; NP_006142	n/a
Location (UCSC)	Chr 17: 58.22 – 58.27 Mb	Chr 11: 87.7 – 87.72 Mb
PubMed search
- Wikidata
View/Edit Human	View/Edit Mouse

Lactoperoxidase (LPO, EC 1.11.1.7) is a peroxidase enzyme secreted from mammary, salivary, tears and other mucosal glands including the lungs, bronchii and nose that function as a natural, first line of defense against bacteria and viral agents. Lactoperoxidase is a member of the heme peroxidase family of enzymes. In humans, lactoperoxidase is encoded by the LPO gene.

Lactoperoxidase catalyzes the oxidation of several inorganic and many organic substrates by hydrogen peroxide. LPO rapidly oxidizes iodide and slowly oxidizes bromide and is designated a haloperoxidase. Another important substrate is the pseudo-halide thiocyanate. Its products are strong oxidizers with potent, non-specific bactericidal and antiviral activities such as hypoiodous acid. A lactoperoxidase system is created when LPO is combined with sources of (pseudo)halide and peroxide. The in vivo human system consists of LPO, its inorganic ion substrates, and the peroxide-generating oxidases DUOX1/DUOX2.

The LPO system plays an important role in the innate immune system by destroying bacteria in milk and mucosal (linings of mostly endodermal origin, covered in epithelium involved in absorption and secretion) secretions. Hence augmentation of the lactoperoxidase system may have therapeutic applications. This system does not vigorously attack DNA and is not mutagenic. However, under certain conditions, the LPO system may contribute to oxidative stress: specifically, it is suspected to contribute to the initiation of breast cancer, through its ability to oxidize estrogenic hormones producing free radical intermediates.

== Structure ==
The structure of lactoperoxidase consists mainly of alpha-helices plus two short antiparallel beta-strands. Lactoperoxidase belongs to the heme peroxidase family of mammalian enzymes that also includes myeloperoxidase (MPO), eosinophil peroxidase (EPO), thyroid peroxidase (TPO), and prostaglandin H synthase (PGHS). A heme cofactor is covalently bound near the center of the protein.

== Function ==
=== Catalytic activity ===
Lactoperoxidase catalyzes the hydrogen peroxide (H_{2}O_{2}) oxidation of several acceptor molecules:

reduced acceptor + H_{2}O_{2} → oxidized acceptor + H_{2}O

Physiological examples include:

- thiocyanate (SCN^{−}) → hypothiocyanite (OSCN^{−})
- iodide (I^{−}) → hypoiodite (IO^{−})
- bromide (Br^{−}) → hypobromite (BrO^{−})

Depending on conditions the turnovers with SCN^{−} or I^{−} are roughly similar. The turnover with Br^{−} is about 10^{−4} smaller than the other two anions.

=== Reaction systems ===
In mammals, hydrogen peroxide is supplied by DUOX1 or DUOX2, a pair of similar oxidases that reduce O_{2} to H_{2}O_{2} by oxidizing NADPH.

In the laboratory, H_{2}O_{2} is usually produced by the reaction of glucose with oxygen in the presence of the enzyme glucose oxidase (EC 1.1.3.4, GOx). As LPO, GOx, and glucose are all present in human saliva, it has been theorized that LPO could play a role in the killing of microbials. In vitro study shows that the glucose level naturally found in human saliva only leads to moderate antifungl activity in a LPO-GOx system.

=== Biological functions ===
LPO is part of the antimicrobial defense system in tissues that express lactoperoxidase. Its oxidation products (see above) act as oxidizing disinfectants, capable of nonselectively killing some invasive bacteria (both aerobic and anaerobic) and most viral agents such as influenza, RSV, and SARS-CoV-2.

==== In milk ====
Lactoperoxidase is naturally present in milk and helps maintain sterility. Lactoferrin, another antimicrobial enzyme in milk, seems to act synergistically with LPO.

==== In saliva ====
As described above, the saliva LPO-GOx system only has moderate anti-Candida activity. However, in vitro research shows that lysozyme, another antimicrobial enzyme in saliva, acts synergistically with LPO in preventing Streptococcus mutans adhesion to saliva-treated hydroxyapatite (emulated tooth surface).

== Applications ==
Lactoperoxidase is an effective antimicrobial and antiviral agent when supplied with (pseudo)halide and peroxide. Consequently, applications of lactoperoxidase are being found in preserving food, cosmetics, and ophthalmic solutions. Furthermore, lactoperoxidase have found application in dental and wound treatment.

=== Dairy ===
The LPO in natural milk eventually runs out of hydrogen peroxide to work with. Adding hydrogen peroxide and thiocyanate to raw milk refuels or "activates" the LPO, extending shelf life under refrigeration.

LPO is fairly heat resistant and partly survives pasteurization. A sample of milk with no residual peroxidase activity in milk is considered over-pasteurized. This can be easily measured qualitatively: add hydrogen peroxide to milk, wait, then use hydrogen peroxide test strip to see if the peroxides have broken down.

=== Cosmetics ===
A combination of lactoperoxidase, glucose, glucose oxidase (GOD), iodide and thiocyanate is claimed to be effective in the preservation of cosmetics.

=== Medicine ===
==== Activators ====
Iodine supplementation has been proposed as a low-cost way to increase the activity of LPO to prevent or reduce the severity of respiratory diseases. All existing studies on this topic are either preclinical (animal) or observational.

==== Oral care ====
A lactoperoxidase system is claimed to be appropriate for the treatment of gingivitis and paradentosis. Lactoperoxidase has been used in toothpaste or a mouthrinse to reduce oral bacteria and consequently the acid produced by those bacteria.

==== Cancer ====
A mix of antibody–drug conjugates where an antibody is linked to LPO or GOx was found to be effective in killing tumor cells in vitro. In this kind of conjugate, an antibody acts as the "seeker" that moves a tumor-killing molecule ("payload") into proximity of targeted cells.

=== Biotechnology ===
Lactoperoxidase has been used with radioactive iodine to selectively label membrane surfaces, making them easier to observe.

== Clinical significance ==
=== Innate immune system ===
The antibacterial and anti-viral activities of lactoperoxidase play an important role in the mammalian immune defense system; the lactoperoxidase system is considered the first line of defense against airborne bacteria and viral agents. Importantly, lactoperoxidase is also extruded into the lung, bronchii and nasal mucus.

Hypothiocyanite is one of the reactive intermediates produced by the activity of lactoperoxidase on thiocyanate and hydrogen peroxide produced by dual oxidase 2 proteins, also known as Duox2. Thiocyanate secretion in cystic fibrosis patients is decreased, resulting in a reduced production of the antimicrobial hypothiocyanite and consequently contributes to increased risk of airway infection.

=== Viral infections ===
Peroxidase-generated hypoiodous acid (HOI), hypoiodite and hypothiocyanite all destroy the herpes simplex virus and human immunodeficiency virus. Both the hypothiocyanite and the hypoiodate ion products are very potent and importantly non-specific antiviral oxidants which are lethal, even in small concentrations, to the influenza virus. The anti-viral activity of lactoperoxidase is enhanced with increasing concentrations of iodide ion. This enzyme has been shown effective against a highly dangerous and tough RNA virus (poliovirus) and a long-lived DNA virus (vaccina).

=== Bacterial infections ===
The duox2-lactoperoxidase system has been shown to offer protection against many dozens of bacteria and mycoplasmas including varieties of the clinically important Staphylococcus and many Streptococcus types. The lactoperoxidase system efficiently inhibits the common helicobacter pylori in buffer; however, in whole human saliva, it seems to have a weaker effect against this microbe. It has been shown that lactoperoxidase in the presence of thiocyanide can catalyze the bactericidal and cytotoxic effects of hydrogen peroxide under specific conditions when hydrogen peroxide is present in excess of thiocyanide. The combination of lactoperoxidase, hydrogen peroxide and thiocyanide is much more effective than hydrogen peroxide alone to inhibit bacterial metabolism and growth.

=== Cancer ===
LPO is suspected to be involved in the causation of breast cancer because of its ability to oxidize estradiol through two one-electron reaction steps, both of which produce oxidative stress. Lactoperoxidase reacts with the phenolic A-ring of estrogens to produce reactive free radicals. LPO can propagate a chain reaction leading to oxygen consumption and intracellular hydrogen peroxide accumulation; this could explain the hydroxyl radical-induced DNA base lesions recently (1990s) reported in female breast cancer tissue. In addition, LPO may activate carcinogenic aromatic and heterocyclic amines and increase binding levels of activated products to DNA, which suggests a potential role of lactoperoxidase-catalyzed activation of carcinogens in the causation of breast cancer.

At the same time, LPO may also play an anti-cancer role as a weapon of the immune system. Knockout mice deficient in lactoperoxidase suffer multisystem inflammation and develop tumors. In addition, macrophages exposed to lactoperoxidase are stimulated to kill cancer cells.

=== Oral care ===
During the last decades, several clinical studies describing the clinical efficacy of the lactoperoxidase system in a variety of oral care products (tooth pastes, mouth rinses) have been published. After showing indirectly, by means of measuring experimental gingivitis and caries parameters, that mouth rinses containing amyloglucosidase (γ-amylase) and glucose oxidase activate the lactoperoxidase system, the protective mechanism of the enzymes in oral care products has been partially elucidated. Enzymes such as lysozyme, lactoperoxidase and glucose oxidase are transferred from the tooth pastes to the pellicle. Being components of the pellicle, these enzymes are catalytically highly active. Also, as part of tooth pastes, the lactoperoxidase system has a beneficial influence to avoid early childhood caries by reducing the number of colonies formed by the cariogenic microflora while increasing the thiocyanate concentration. With xerostomia patients, tooth pastes with the lactoperoxidase system are seemingly superior to fluoride-containing tooth pastes with respect to plaque formation and gingivitis. More studies are required to examine further the protective mechanisms.

The application of lactoperoxidase is not restricted to caries, gingivitis, and periodontitis. A combination of lysozyme and lactoperoxidase can be applied to support the treatment of the burning mouth syndrome (glossodynia). In combination with lactoferrin, lactoperoxidase combats halitosis; in combination with lactoferrin and lysozyme, lactoperoxidase helps to improve symptoms of xerostomia. Furthermore, gels with lactoperoxidase help to improve symptoms of oral cancer when saliva production is compromised due to irradiation. In this case, also the oral bacterial flora are influenced favorably.

== See also ==
- Respiratory tract antimicrobial defense system
