= Respiratory tract antimicrobial defense system =

The respiratory tract antimicrobial defense system is a layered defense mechanism which relies on components of both the innate and adaptive immune systems to protect the lungs and the rest of the respiratory tract against inhaled microorganisms.

In the first line of defense, inhaled bacteria are trapped by mucus and are swept toward the pharynx and are swallowed. Bacteria which penetrate the mucous layer are dealt with a second line of defense which includes antimicrobial peptides that are secreted by the surface epithelium of the respiratory tract which kill many strains of bacteria. Those bacteria that are resistant to antimicrobial peptides are killed by a variety of reactive oxygen species produced by phagocytes. In a third line of defense and as a last resort, persistent bacterial infections which escape the innate immune system are eliminated by the adaptive immune system.

== Lactoferrin ==
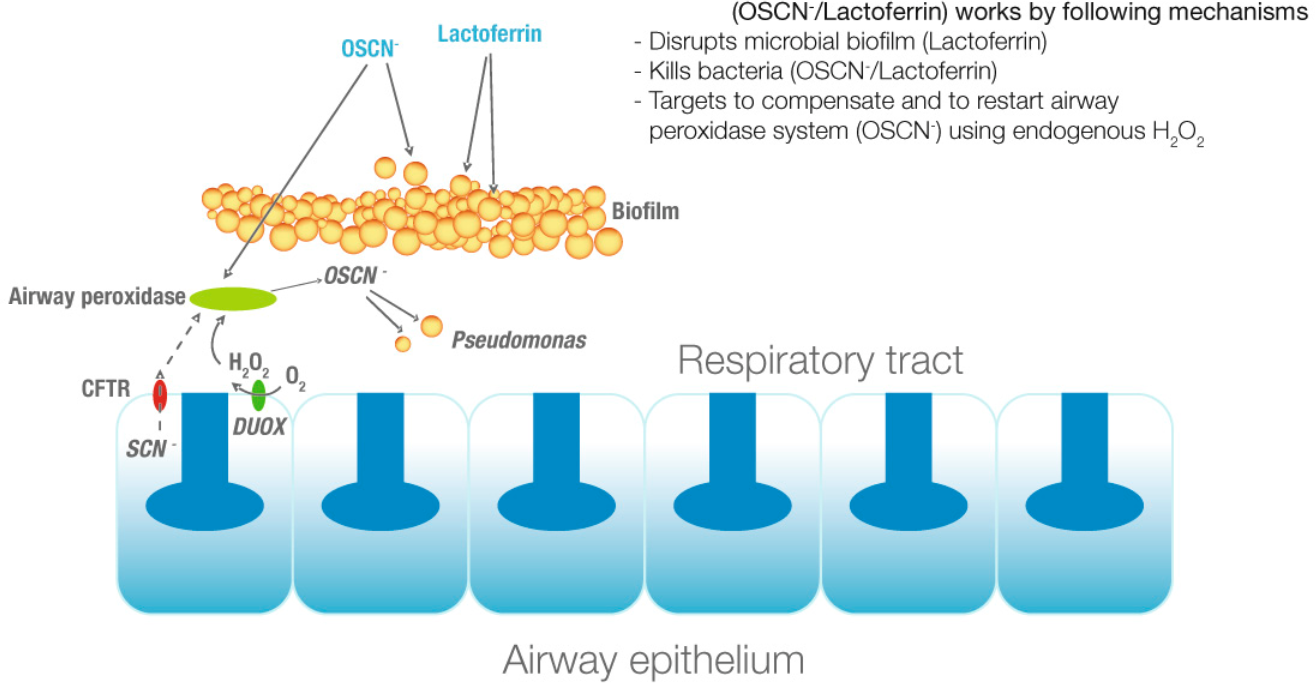
Schematic diagram of the respiratory tract antimicrobial defense system.

Lactoferrin (LF) is a multifunctional protein which is an essential part of the respiratory tract antimicrobial defense system. LF proteolysis produces the small peptides lactoferricin and kaliocin-1 both with antimicrobial activity.

== Reactive oxygen species, oxygenated compounds ==
Phagocytes possess a superoxide-producing NADPH oxidase enzyme complex. Other cells in the respiratory tract also produce superoxide and hydrogen peroxide through the activity of dual oxidase 2 proteins, also known as Duox2.

The superoxide generated by these enzymes complexes dismutates into hydrogen peroxide which in turn is used by myeloperoxidase to produce bactericidal hypochlorous acid. In addition, the submucosal glands of the respiratory tract secrete myeloperoxidase and lactoperoxidase (LPO) that catalyzes the oxidation of thiocyanate and detoxify hydrogen peroxide or ROS to the antimicrobial hypothiocyanite.

The oxygenated compounds produced by the lactoperoxidase system does not attack DNA and is not mutagenic and is known to be safe. Hypothiocyanite generated through this pathway displays broad spectrum bactericidal activity including potent antibacterial action on H. pylori.

== Cystic fibrosis ==
Thiocyanate secretion in cystic fibrosis patients is decreased resulting in a reduced production of the antimicrobial hypothiocyanite and consequently contributes to the increased risk of airway infection.

== Therapeutic applications ==
Lactoferrin with hypothiocyanite for the treatment of cystic fibrosis has been granted orphan drug status by the EMEA and the FDA.
