= Hypothiocyanite =

- [OSCN]^{−}

Names
- IUPAC name Oxido thiocyanate
- Other names Cyanosulfoxylate

Identifiers
CAS Number	63296-34-4
3D model (JSmol)	Interactive image
DrugBank	DB15309
PubChem CID	124984
UNII	N84CZ7T0OY
- InChI: InChI=1S/CHNOS/c2-1-4-3/h3H/p-1 Key: ZCZCOXLLICTZAH-UHFFFAOYSA-M
- SMILES: C(#N)S[O-]

Properties
Chemical formula	CNOS^{−}
Molar mass	74.08 g·mol^{−1}
- Except where otherwise noted, data are given for materials in their standard state (at 25 °C [77 °F], 100 kPa). Infobox references

Hypothiocyanite is the anion [OSCN]^{−} and the conjugate base of hypothiocyanous acid (HOSCN). It is an organic compound part of the thiocyanates as it contains the functional group SCN. It is formed when an oxygen is singly bonded to the thiocyanate group. Hypothiocyanous acid is a fairly weak acid; its acid dissociation constant (pK_{a}) is 5.3.

Hypothiocyanite is formed by peroxidase catalysis of hydrogen peroxide and thiocyanate:

H_{2}O_{2} + SCN^{−} → OSCN^{−} + H_{2}O

== As a bactericide ==
Hypothiocyanite occurs naturally in the antimicrobial immune system of the human respiratory tract in a redox reaction catalyzed by the enzyme lactoperoxidase. It has been researched extensively for its capabilities as an alternative antibiotic as it is harmless to human body cells while being cytotoxic to bacteria. The exact processes for making hypothiocyanite have been patented as such an effective antimicrobial has many commercial applications.

=== Mechanism of action ===
Lactoperoxidase-catalysed reactions yield short-lived intermediary oxidation products of SCN^{−}, providing antibacterial activity.

The major intermediary oxidation product is hypothiocyanite OSCN^{−}, which is produced in an amount of about 1 mole per mole of hydrogen peroxide. At the pH optimum of 5.3, the OSCN^{−} is in equilibrium with HOSCN. The uncharged HOSCN is considered to be the greater bactericidal of the two forms. At pH 7, it was evaluated that HOSCN represents 2% compare to OSCN^{−} 98%.

The action of OSCN^{−} against bacteria is reported to be caused by sulfhydryl (SH) oxidation.

The oxidation of -SH groups in the bacterial cytoplasmic membrane results in loss of the ability to transport glucose and also in leaking of potassium ions, amino acids and peptide.

OSCN^{−} has also been identified as an antimicrobial agent in milk, saliva, tears, and mucus.

OSCN^{−} is considered as a safe product as it is not mutagenic.

=== Relation to cystic fibrosis ===
Initially, this particular lactoperoxidase-catalyzed compound was originally discovered while viewing the specific environment of cystic fibrosis patients' weakened respiratory immune system against bacterial infection.

Symptoms of cystic fibrosis include an inability to secrete sufficient quantities of SCN^{−} which results in a shortage of necessary hypothiocyanite, resulting in increasing mucous viscosity, inflammation and bacterial infection in the respiratory tract.

Lactoferrin with hypothiocyanite has been granted orphan drug status by the EMEA and the FDA.

Naturally, the discovery correlated with studies exploring different methods seeking to further gain alternative antibiotics, understanding that most older antibiotics are decreasing in effectiveness against bacteria with antibiotic resistance.

OSCN^{−}, which is not an antibiotic, has proved efficacy on superbugs including MRSA reference strains, BCC, Mucoid PA

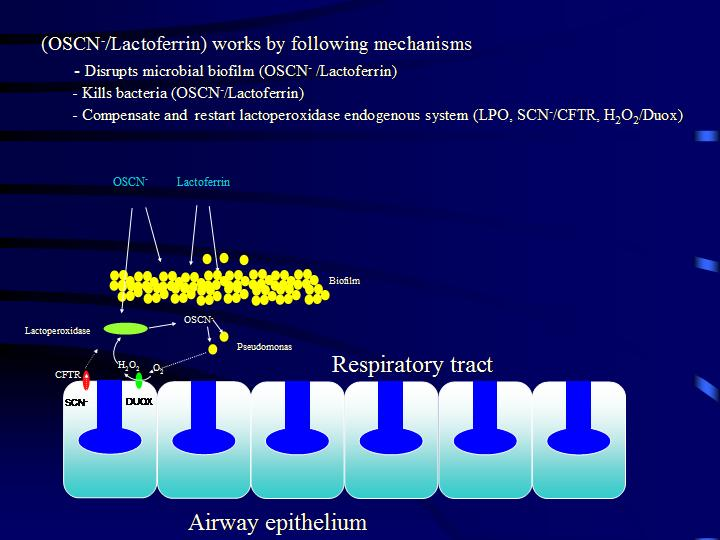
Schema of LPO/SCN^{−}/H_{2}O_{2} in human lung:

=== Efficacy range ===
Non exhaustive list of microorganisms.

Bacteria (Gram-positive and -negative)

- Acinetobacter spp.
- Aeromonas hydrophila
- Bacillus brevis
- Bacillus cereus
- Bacillus megaterium
- Bacillus subtilis
- Burkholderia cepacia
- Campylobacter jejuni
- Capnocytophaga ochracea
- Corynebacterium xerosis
- Enterobacter cloacae
- Escherichia coli
- Haemophilus influenzae
- Helicobacter pylori
- Klebsiella oxytoca
- Klebsiella pneumoniae
- Legionella spp.
- Listeria monocytogenes
- Micrococcus luteus
- Mycobacterium smegmatis
- Mycobacterium abscessus
- Neisseria spp.
- Pseudomonas aeruginosa
- Pseudomonas pyocyanea
- Salmonella spp.
- Selenomonas sputigena
- Shigella sonnei
- Staphylococcus aerogenes
- Staphylococcus aureus
- Streptococcus agalactiae
- Streptococcus faecalis
- Streptococcus mutans
- Wolinella recta
- Xanthomonas campestris
- Yersinia enterocolitica

Viruses

- Echovirus 11
- Herpes simplex virus, HSV
- Influenza virus
- Human immunodeficiency virus, HIV
- Respiratory syncytial virus, RSV

Yeasts and moulds

- Aspergillus niger
- Botryodiplodia theobromae
- Byssochlamys fulva
- Candida albicans
- Colletotrichum gloeosporioide
- Colletotrichum musae
- Fusarium monoliforme
- Fusarium oxysporum
- Rhodotula rubra
- Sclerotinia spp.

== See also ==
- Respiratory tract antimicrobial defense system
