= Lactoferricin =

Identifiers
- Symbol: N/A
- OPM superfamily: 203
- OPM protein: 1lfc

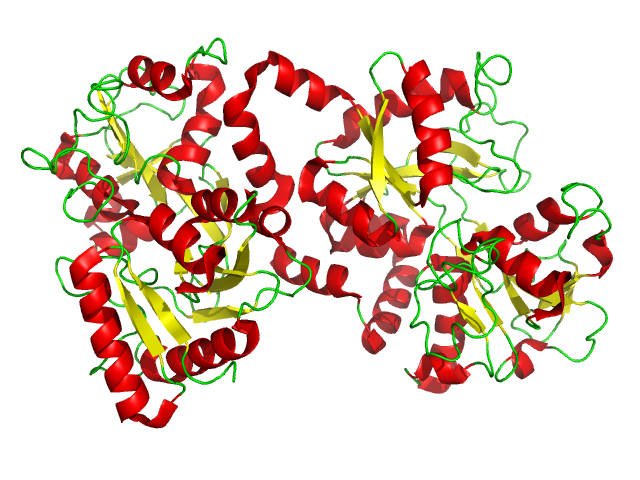
Lactoferrin Structure

Lactoferricin is an amphipathic, cationic peptide with anti-microbial and anti-cancer properties. It can be generated by the pepsin-mediated digestion of lactoferrin.

Lactoferricin is the most studied AMP derived from milk protein. The complete sequence of lactoferricin corresponds to lactoferrin fragment 17-41 (FKCRRWQWRM KKLGAPSITCVRRAF; LFB0084) and sequences from within this fragment are also antimicrobial. The MilkAMP database contains a total of 111 peptides (natural, synthetic and modified) comprising or derived from the complete lactoferricin. In humans, lactoferricin corresponds to lactoferrin fragment 1-47 but consists of two subunits, namely fragments 1-11 and 12-47 (LFH0009), connected by a disulfide bridge.

Human Lactoferricin and Bovine Lactoferricin are two greatly studied forms of Lactoferricin. These two forms have great sequence differences. Bovine Lactoferricin contains 25 residues, while Human Lactoferricin contains 49 residues. Also, when placed in solution Bovine Lactoferricin forms a β-pleated sheet, while Human Lactoferricin forms a coiled structure.
