= Lactoferrin =

Mammalian protein found in Homo sapiens

LTF
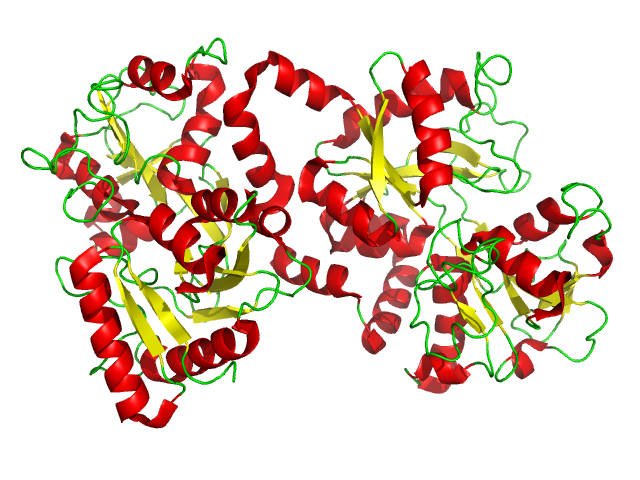

Identifiers
- Aliases: LTF, GIG12, HEL110, HLF2, LF, lactotransferrin
- External IDs: OMIM: 150210; MGI: 96837; GeneCards: LTF
Available structures
PDB	Ortholog search: PDBe RCSB
PDB	List of PDB id codes 2PMS, 1B0L, 1BKA, 1CB6, 1DSN, 1EH3, 1FCK, 1H43, 1H44, 1H45, 1HSE, 1L5T, 1LCF, 1LCT, 1LFG, 1LFH, 1LFI, 1LGB, 1N76, 1SQY, 1U62, 1VFD, 1VFE, 1XV4, 1XV7, 1Z6V, 1Z6W, 2BJJ, 2DP4, 2GMC, 2GMD, 2HD4

Gene location (Human)
Chr.	Chromosome 3 (human)
Band	3p21.31	Start	46,435,645 bp
Band	3p21.31	End	46,485,234 bp

Gene location (Mouse)
Chr.	Chromosome 9 (mouse)
Band	9 F2|9 60.79 cM	Start	110,848,339 bp
Band	9 F2|9 60.79 cM	End	110,871,835 bp
RNA expression pattern
Bgee	Human / Mouse (ortholog); Top expressed in: trachea; trabecular bone; olfactory zone of nasal mucosa; parotid gland; bone marrow cell; pylorus; seminal vesicula; corpus epididymis; epithelium of lactiferous gland; lactiferous duct / Top expressed in: granulocyte; tibiofemoral joint; lacrimal gland; cervix; lactiferous gland; olfactory epithelium; parotid gland; superior surface of tongue; femur; body of femur; More reference expression data
BioGPS	n/a
Gene ontology
Molecular function	iron ion binding; DNA binding; heparin binding; protein serine/threonine kinase activator activity; metal ion binding; peptidase activity; protein binding; serine-type peptidase activity; serine-type endopeptidase activity; hydrolase activity; lipopolysaccharide binding; cysteine-type endopeptidase inhibitor activity
Cellular component	cytoplasm; secretory granule; extracellular region; cell surface; specific granule; phagocytic vesicle lumen; extracellular exosome; nucleus; extracellular space; specific granule lumen; tertiary granule lumen; protein-containing complex
Biological process	positive regulation of osteoblast proliferation; regulation of transcription, DNA-templated; positive regulation of chondrocyte proliferation; negative regulation of osteoclast development; ossification; regulation of tumor necrosis factor production; negative regulation of viral process; immune system process; negative regulation of ATP-dependent activity; antibacterial humoral response; bone morphogenesis; iron ion homeostasis; positive regulation of bone mineralization involved in bone maturation; negative regulation of apoptotic process; ion transport; transcription, DNA-templated; proteolysis; positive regulation of protein serine/threonine kinase activity; negative regulation of single-species biofilm formation in or on host organism; negative regulation by host of viral process; negative regulation of lipopolysaccharide-mediated signaling pathway; regulation of cytokine production; negative regulation of tumor necrosis factor (ligand) superfamily member 11 production; retina homeostasis; negative regulation of viral genome replication; innate immune response in mucosa; positive regulation of osteoblast differentiation; humoral immune response; defense response to bacterium; positive regulation of NF-kappaB transcription factor activity; positive regulation of I-kappaB kinase/NF-kappaB signaling; positive regulation of toll-like receptor 4 signaling pathway; siderophore-dependent iron import into cell; antimicrobial humoral response; neutrophil degranulation; innate immune response; negative regulation of membrane potential; antimicrobial humoral immune response mediated by antimicrobial peptide; negative regulation of cysteine-type endopeptidase activity; transport; antifungal humoral response
Sources:Amigo / QuickGO
Orthologs
Databases	NCBI: entry; OMA: entry
Species	Human	Mouse
Entrez	4057	17002
Ensembl	ENSG00000012223	ENSMUSG00000032496
UniProt	P02788	P08071
RefSeq (mRNA)	NM_002343; NM_001199149; NM_001321121; NM_001321122	NM_008522
RefSeq (protein)	NP_001186078; NP_001308050; NP_001308051; NP_002334	NP_032548
Location (UCSC)	Chr 3: 46.44 – 46.49 Mb	Chr 9: 110.85 – 110.87 Mb
PubMed search
- Wikidata
View/Edit Human	View/Edit Mouse

Lactoferrin (LF), also known as lactotransferrin (LTF), is a multifunctional protein found in milk and mucus which is encoded by the LTF gene in humans. It functions as an antimicrobial protein and affects the body's immune response in a complex way, with both pro- and anti-inflammatory effects.

Lactoferrin is part of the transferrin family. It is a globular glycoprotein with a molecular mass of about 80 kDa that is widely represented in various secretory fluids, such as milk, saliva, tears, and nasal secretions. Lactoferrin is also present in secondary granules of PMNs and is secreted by some acinar cells. Lactoferrin can be purified from milk or produced recombinantly. Human colostrum ("first milk") has the highest concentration, followed by human milk, then cow milk (150 mg/L).

Lactoferrin is one of the components of the immune system of the body; it has antimicrobial activity (bacteriocide, fungicide) and is part of the innate defense, mainly at mucosas. It is constantly produced and released into saliva, tears, as well as seminal and vaginal fluid. Lactoferrin provides antibacterial activity to human infants. Lactoferrin interacts with DNA and RNA, polysaccharides and heparin, and shows some of its biological functions in complexes with these ligands.

Lactoferrin supplements reduce the risk of respiratory tract infections, based on a recent meta-analysis of randomized controlled trials. As with any supplements sold online, quality may be an issue because nutritional supplement production quality controls are not subject to the same strict regulatory process as medicines.

== History ==
Occurrence of iron-containing red protein in bovine milk was reported as early as in 1939; however, the protein could not be properly characterized because it could not be extracted with sufficient purity. Its first detailed studies were reported around 1960. They documented the molecular weight, isoelectric point, optical absorption spectra and presence of two iron atoms per protein molecule. The protein was extracted from milk, contained iron and was structurally and chemically similar to serum transferrin. Therefore, it was named lactoferrin in 1961, though the name lactotransferrin was used in some earlier publications, and later studies demonstrated that the protein is not restricted to milk. The antibacterial action of lactoferrin was also documented in 1961, and was associated with its ability to bind iron.

Recombinant lactoferrin production began in the 1990s with the expression of human lactoferrin (hLF) in microbial hosts, notably filamentous fungi such as Aspergillus oryzae, achieving yields exceeding 2 g/L in some cases. Yeast expression systems, particularly Pichia pastoris, were subsequently developed for scalable and cost-effective production. In a landmark development, Sydney-based biotechnology company All G became the first in the world to gain regulatory approval to sell recombinant bovine lactoferrin in China, achieved in November 2024 through precision fermentation (animal-free, microbe-based production).

== Application ==
As of 2022, there is limited quality evidence for the use of lactoferrin medicinally. For example, while there is evidence for its role in the treatment of conditions such as inflammatory bowel disease and for anti-microbial activity, there is not yet enough quality data to understand lactoferrin's bioavailability (such as through the digestive system) and more research needs to be done to understand the difference between various sources of lactoferrin (such as human vs. bovine forms).

== Structure ==
=== Genes of lactoferrin ===
At least 60 gene sequences of lactoferrin have been characterized in 11 species of mammals. In most species, stop codon is TAA, and TGA in Mus musculus. Deletions, insertions and mutations of stop codons affect the coding part and its length varies between 2,055 and 2,190 nucleotide pairs. Gene polymorphism between species is much more diverse than the intraspecific polymorphism of lactoferrin. There are differences in amino acid sequences: 8 in Homo sapiens, 6 in Mus musculus, 6 in Capra hircus, 10 in Bos taurus and 20 in Sus scrofa. This variation may indicate functional differences between different types of lactoferrin.

In humans, lactoferrin gene LTF is located on the third chromosome in the locus 3q21-q23. In oxen, the coding sequence consists of 17 exons and has a length of about 34,500 nucleotide pairs. Exons of the lactoferrin gene in oxen have a similar size to the exons of other genes of the transferrin family, whereas the sizes of introns differ within the family. Similarity in the size of exons and their distribution in the domains of the protein molecule indicates that the evolutionary development of lactoferrin gene occurred by duplication. Study of polymorphism of genes that encode lactoferrin helps selecting livestock breeds that are resistant to mastitis.

=== Molecular structure ===
Lactoferrin is one of the transferrin proteins that transfer iron to the cells and control the level of free iron in the blood and external secretions. It is present in the milk of humans and other mammals, in the blood plasma and neutrophils and is one of the major proteins of virtually all exocrine secretions of mammals, such as saliva, bile, tears and pancreas. Concentration of lactoferrin in the milk varies from 7 g/L in human colostrum to 1 g/L in mature milk.

X-ray diffraction reveals that lactoferrin is based on one polypeptide chain that contains about 700 amino acids and forms two homologous globular domains named N-and C-lobes. N-lobe corresponds to amino acid residues 1-333 and C-lobe to 345–692, and the ends of those domains are connected by a short α-helix. Each lobe consists of two subdomains, N1, N2 and C1, C2, and contains one iron binding site and one glycosylation site. The degree of glycosylation of the protein may be different and therefore the molecular weight of lactoferrin varies between 76 and 80 kDa. The stability of lactoferrin has been associated with the high glycosylation degree.

Lactoferrin belongs to the basic proteins; its isoelectric point is 8.7. It exists in two forms: iron-rich hololactoferrin and iron-free apolactoferrin. Their tertiary structures are different; apolactoferrin is characterized by "open" conformation of the N-lobe and the "closed" conformation of the C-lobe, and both lobes are closed in the hololactoferrin.

Each lactoferrin molecule can reversibly bind two ions of iron, zinc, copper or other metals. The binding sites are localized in each of the two protein globules. There, each ion is bonded with six ligands: four from the polypeptide chain (two tyrosine residues, one histidine residue and one aspartic acid residue) and two from carbonate or bicarbonate ions.

Lactoferrin forms a reddish complex with iron; its affinity for iron is 300 times higher than that of transferrin. The affinity increases in weakly acidic medium. This facilitates the transfer of iron from transferrin to lactoferrin during inflammations, when the pH of tissues decreases due to accumulation of lactic and other acids. The saturated iron concentration in lactoferrin in human milk is estimated as 10 to 30% (100% corresponds to all lactoferrin molecules containing 2 iron atoms). It is demonstrated that lactoferrin is involved not only in the transport of iron, zinc and copper, but also in the regulation of their intake. Presence of loose ions of zinc and copper does not affect the iron binding ability of lactoferrin, and might even increase it.

=== Polymeric forms ===
Both in blood plasma and in secretory fluids lactoferrin can exist in different polymeric forms ranging from monomers to tetramers. Lactoferrin tends to polymerize both in vitro and in vivo, especially at high concentrations. Several authors found that the dominant form of lactoferrin in physiological conditions is a tetramer, with the monomer:tetramer ratio of 1:4 at the protein concentrations of 10^{−5} M.

It is suggested that the oligomer state of lactoferrin is determined by its concentration and that polymerization of lactoferrin is strongly affected by the presence of Ca^{2+} ions. In particular, monomers were dominant at concentrations below 10^{−10}−10^{−11} M in the presence of Ca^{2+}, but they converted into tetramers at lactoferrin concentrations above 10^{−9}−10^{−10} M. Titer of lactoferrin in the blood corresponds to this particular "transition concentration" and thus lactoferrin in the blood should be presented both as a monomer and tetramer. Many functional properties of lactoferrin depend on its oligomeric state. In particular, monomeric, but not tetrameric lactoferrin can strongly bind to DNA.

== Function ==
Lactoferrin belongs to the innate immune system. Apart from its main biological function, namely binding and transport of iron ions, lactoferrin also has antibacterial, antiviral, antiparasitic, catalytic, anti-cancer, and anti-allergic functions and properties.

=== Enzymatic activity of lactoferrin ===
Lactoferrin hydrolyzes RNA and exhibits the properties of pyrimidine-specific secretory ribonucleases. In particular, by destroying the RNA genome, milk RNase inhibits reverse transcription of retroviruses that cause breast cancer in mice. Parsi women in West India have the milk RNase level markedly lower than in other groups, and their breast cancer rate is three times higher than average. Thus, ribonucleases of milk, and lactoferrin in particular, might play an important role in pathogenesis.

=== Lactoferrin receptor ===
The lactoferrin receptor plays an important role in the internalization of lactoferrin; it also facilitates absorption of iron ions by lactoferrin. It was shown that gene expression increases with age in the duodenum and decreases in the jejunum. The moonlighting glycolytic enzyme glyceraldehyde-3-phosphate dehydrogenase (GAPDH) has been demonstrated to function as a receptor for lactoferrin.

=== Bone activity ===
Ribonuclease-enriched lactoferrin has been used to examine how lactoferrin affects bone. Lactoferrin has shown to have positive effects on bone turnover. It has aided in decreasing bone resorption and increasing bone formation. This was indicated by a decrease in the levels of two bone resorption markers (deoxypyridinoline and N-telopeptide) and an increase in the levels two bone formation markers (osteocalcin and alkaline phosphatase). It has reduced osteoclast formation, which signifies a decrease in pro-inflammatory responses and an increase in anti-inflammatory responses which indicates a reduction in bone resorption as well.

=== Interaction with nucleic acids ===
One of the important properties of lactoferrin is its ability to bind with nucleic acids. The fraction of protein extracted from milk, contains 3.3% RNA, but, the protein preferably binds to double-stranded DNA rather than single-stranded DNA. The ability of lactoferrin to bind DNA is used for its isolation and purification using affinity chromatography with columns containing immobilized DNA-containing sorbents, such as agarose with the immobilized single-stranded DNA.

== Clinical significance ==
Lactoferrin (larger protein) and a siderophore of E. coli (smaller protein) are shown. Lactoferrin is a protein found in the immune system, and is a common defense against bacterial infections. Lactoferrin restricts access to host iron by binding to iron with a higher affinity than bacterial proteins.

=== Antibacterial activity ===
Lactoferrin's primary role is to sequester free iron, and in doing so remove essential substrate required for bacterial growth. Antibacterial action of lactoferrin is also explained by the presence of specific receptors on the cell surface of microorganisms. Lactoferrin binds to lipopolysaccharide of bacterial walls, and the oxidized iron part of the lactoferrin oxidizes bacteria via formation of peroxides. This affects the membrane permeability and results in the cell breakdown (lysis).

Although lactoferrin also has other antibacterial mechanisms not related to iron, such as stimulation of phagocytosis, the interaction with the outer bacterial membrane described above is the most dominant and most studied. Lactoferrin not only disrupts the membrane, but even penetrates into the cell. Its binding to the bacteria wall is associated with the specific peptide lactoferricin, which is located at the N-lobe of lactoferrin and is produced by in vitro cleavage of lactoferrin with another protein, trypsin. A mechanism of the antimicrobial action of lactoferrin has been reported as lactoferrin targets H^{+}-ATPase and interferes with proton translocation in the cell membrane, resulting in a lethal effect in vitro.

Lactoferrin prevents the attachment of H. pylori in the stomach, which in turn, aids in reducing digestive system disorders. Bovine lactoferrin has more activity against H. pylori than human lactoferrin.

=== Antiviral activity ===
Lactoferrin in sufficient strength acts on a wide range of human and animal viruses based on DNA and RNA genomes, including the herpes simplex virus 1 and 2, cytomegalovirus, HIV, hepatitis C virus, hantaviruses, rotaviruses, poliovirus type 1, human respiratory syncytial virus, murine leukemia viruses and Mayaro virus. Activity against COVID-19 has been speculated but not proven.

The most studied mechanism of antiviral activity of lactoferrin is its diversion of virus particles from the target cells. Many viruses tend to bind to the lipoproteins of the cell membranes and then penetrate into the cell. Lactoferrin binds to the same lipoproteins thereby repelling the virus particles. Iron-free apolactoferrin is more efficient in this function than hololactoferrin; and lactoferricin, which is responsible for antimicrobial properties of lactoferrin, shows almost no antiviral activity.

Beside interacting with the cell membrane, lactoferrin also directly binds to viral particles, such as the hepatitis viruses. This mechanism is also confirmed by the antiviral activity of lactoferrin against rotaviruses, which act on different cell types.

Lactoferrin also suppresses virus replication after the virus penetrated into the cell. Such an indirect antiviral effect is achieved by affecting natural killer cells, granulocytes and macrophages – cells, which play a crucial role in the early stages of viral infections, such as severe acute respiratory syndrome (SARS).

=== Antifungal activity ===
Lactoferrin and lactoferricin inhibit in vitro growth of Trichophyton mentagrophytes, which are responsible for several skin diseases such as ringworm. Lactoferrin also acts against the Candida albicans – a diploid fungus (a form of yeast) that causes opportunistic oral and genital infections in humans. Fluconazole has long been used against Candida albicans, which resulted in emergence of strains resistant to this drug. However, a combination of lactoferrin with fluconazole can act against fluconazole-resistant strains of Candida albicans as well as other types of Candida: C. glabrata, C. krusei, C. parapsilosis and C. tropicalis. Antifungal activity is observed for sequential incubation of Candida with lactoferrin and then with fluconazole, but not vice versa. The antifungal activity of lactoferricin exceeds that of lactoferrin. In particular, synthetic peptide 1–11 lactoferricin shows much greater activity against Candida albicans than native lactoferricin.

Administration of lactoferrin through drinking water to mice with weakened immune systems and symptoms of aphthous ulcer reduced the number of Candida albicans strains in the mouth and the size of the damaged areas in the tongue. Oral administration of lactoferrin to animals also reduced the number of pathogenic organisms in the tissues close to the gastrointestinal tract. Candida albicans could also be completely eradicated with a mixture containing lactoferrin, lysozyme and itraconazole in HIV-positive patients who were resistant to other antifungal drugs. Such antifungal action when other drugs deem inefficient is characteristic of lactoferrin and is especially valuable for HIV-infected patients. Contrary to the antiviral and antibacterial actions of lactoferrin, very little is known about the mechanism of its antifungal action. Lactoferrin seems to bind the plasma membrane of C. albicans inducing an apoptotic-like process.

=== Anticarcinogenic activity ===
The anticancer activity of bovine lactoferrin (bLF) has been demonstrated in experimental lung, bladder, tongue, colon, and liver carcinogeneses on rats, possibly by suppression of phase I enzymes, such as cytochrome P450 1A2 (CYP1A2). Also, in another experiment done on hamsters, bovine lactoferrin decreased the incidence of oral cancer by 50%. Currently, bLF is used as an ingredient in yogurt, chewing gums, infant formulas, and cosmetics.

=== Cystic fibrosis ===
The human lung and saliva contain a wide range of antimicrobial compound including lactoperoxidase system, producing hypothiocyanite and lactoferrin, with hypothiocyanite missing in cystic fibrosis patients. Lactoferrin, a component of innate immunity, prevents bacterial biofilm development. The loss of microbicidal activity and increased formation of biofilm due to decreased lactoferrin activity is observed in patients with cystic fibrosis. In cystic fibrosis, antibiotic susceptibility may be modified by lactoferrin. These findings demonstrate the important role of lactoferrin in human host defense and especially in lung. Lactoferrin with hypothiocyanite has been granted orphan drug status by the EMEA and the FDA.

=== Necrotizing enterocolitis ===
Low quality evidence suggests that oral lactoferrin supplementation with or without the addition of a probiotic may decrease late onset of sepsis and necrotizing enterocolitis (stage II or III) in preterm infants with no adverse effects.

=== In diagnosis ===
Lactoferrin levels in tear fluid have been shown to decrease in dry eye diseases such as Sjögren's disease. A rapid, portable test utilizing microfluidic technology has been developed to enable measurement of lactoferrin levels in human tear fluid at the point-of-care with the aim of improving diagnosis of Sjögren's disease and other forms of dry eye disease.

== Technology ==
=== Extraction ===
Bovine lactoferrin can be isolated from raw milk, colostrum, or whey using methods such as salt extraction, chromatography, and membrane filtration. Lactoferrin from a variety of species, including humans, can also be produced using transgenic organisms as a recombinant protein.

=== Nanotechnology ===
Lactotransferrin has been used in the synthesis of fluorescent gold quantum clusters, which has potential applications in nanotechnology.

== See also ==
- Respiratory tract antimicrobial defense system
