= List of the Cenozoic life of Maryland =

This list of the Cenozoic life of Maryland contains the various prehistoric life-forms whose fossilized remains have been reported from within the US state of Maryland and are between 66 million and 10,000 years of age.

== A ==
- †Abra – tentative report
  - †Abra longicalla
- Acanthodesia
  - †Acanthodesia oblongula
  - †Acanthodesia savartii
- †Acantodesia
  - †Acantodesia oblongula
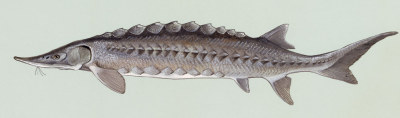
- Illustration of a living Acipenser sturgeon
  Acipenser
- †Acrocoelum
  - †Acrocoelum richardsi – type locality for species
- Acropora
  - †Acropora palmata
- Acteocina
  - †Acteocina canaliculata
- Acteon
  - †Acteon danicus – type locality for species
  - †Acteon ovoides
- †Adocus
- †Aepycamelus – tentative report
- Aetobatus
  - †Aetobatus arcuatus
  - †Aetobatus irregularis
  - †Aetobatus profundus – type locality for species
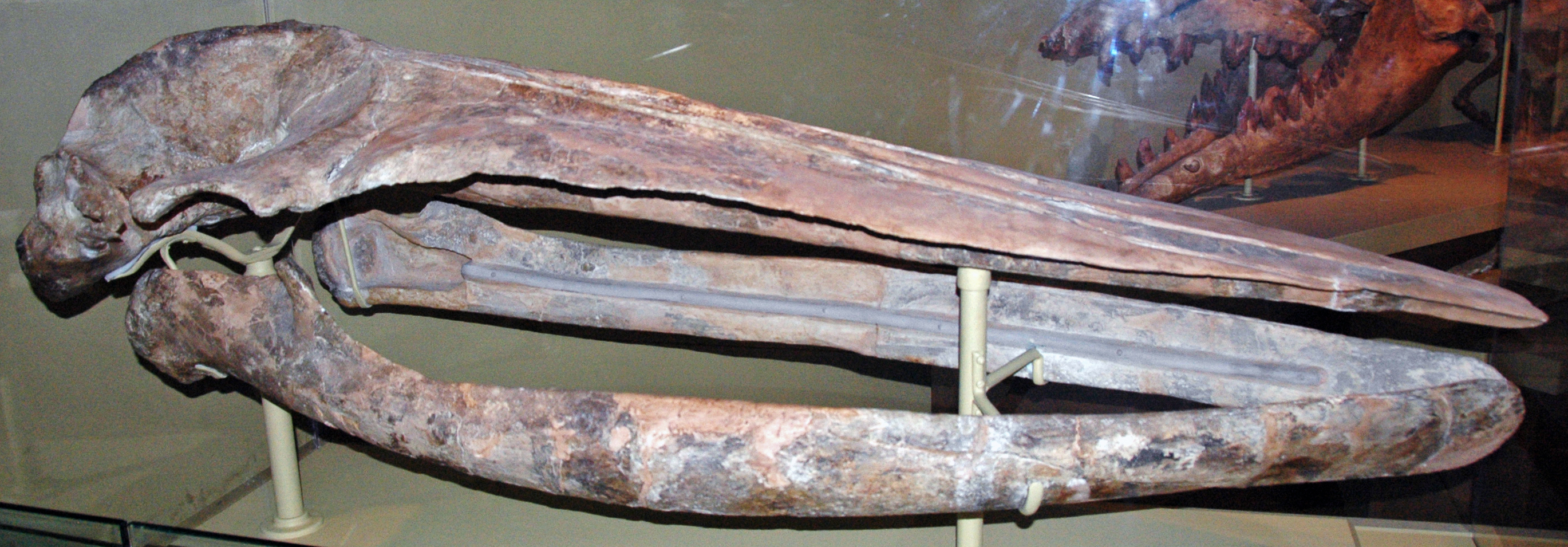
- Fossilized skull of the Miocene baleen whale Aglaocetus
  †Aglaocetus
  - †Aglaocetus patulus
- Alca
  - †Alca torda – or unidentified comparable form
- Aligena
  - †Aligena aequata
  - †Aligena elevata
- †Ambystoma
  - †Ambystoma maculatum
  - †Ambystoma tigrinum
- Amia
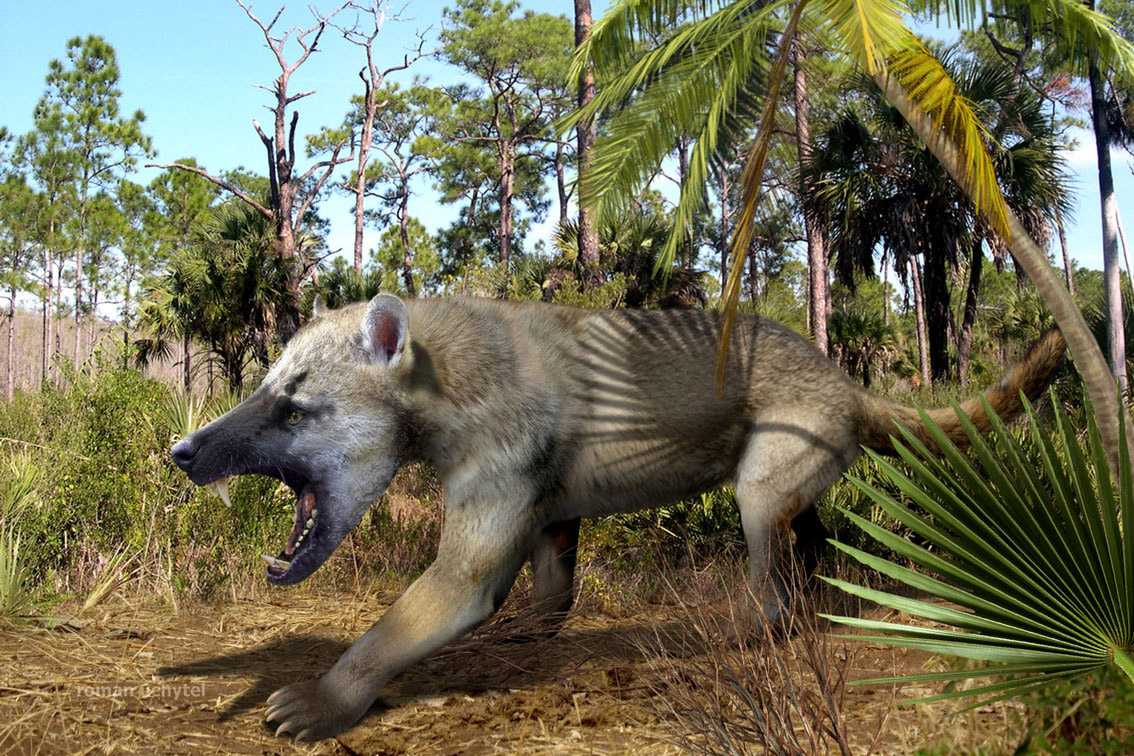
- Life restoration of the Miocene-Pliocene beardog Amphicyon
  †Amphicyon
- Amyda
  - †Amyda cellulosa
- Anachis
  - †Anachis avara
- Anadara
  - †Anadara andrewsi
  - †Anadara ovalis
  - †Anadara subrostrata
  - †Anadara transversa
- Anas
  - †Anas crecca
- Ancilla – report made of unidentified related form or using admittedly obsolete nomenclature
- Angulus
  - †Angulus agilis
- Anomia
  - †Anomia aculeata
  - †Anomia marylandica
  - †Anomia multilineata
  - †Anomia simplex
- Anticlimax – tentative report
  - †Anticlimax gardnerae – type locality for species
- †Aphelops – tentative report
- †Aporrhaid
  - †Aporrhaid gastropod
- Aporrhais
  - †Aporrhais potomacensis
- Aquila
  - †Aquila chrysaetos
- †Araeodelphis – type locality for genus
  - †Araeodelphis natator – type locality for species
- †Araloselachus
  - †Araloselachus cuspidata
- Arca
  - †Arca callipleura
  - †Arca improcera
- †Archaeohippus
- Architectonica
  - †Architectonica form A informal
  - †Architectonica form B informal
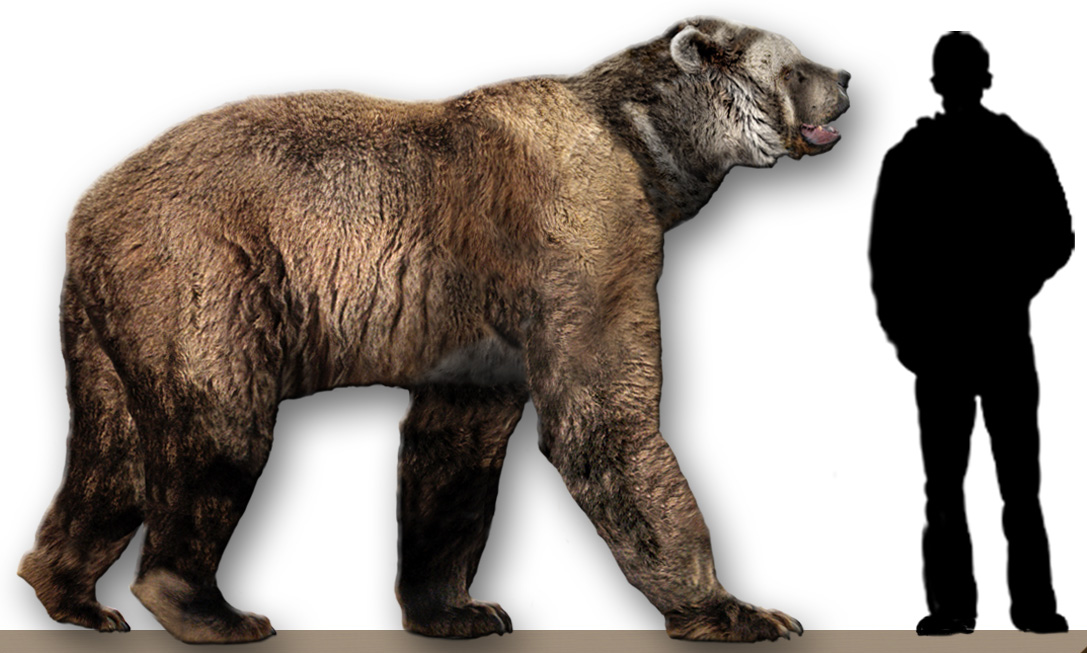
- Restoration of an Arctodus, or short-faced bear, with a human to scale
  †Arctodus
  - †Arctodus pristinus
- Argopecten
  - †Argopecten irradians
- †Armatobalanus
  - †Armatobalanus calvertensis
- Arossia
  - †Arossia bohaska – type locality for species
  - †Arossia cummembrana – type locality for species
  - †Arossia newmani
- †Asaphis
  - †Asaphis centenaria
- †Aspideretoides
  - †Aspideretoides virginianus
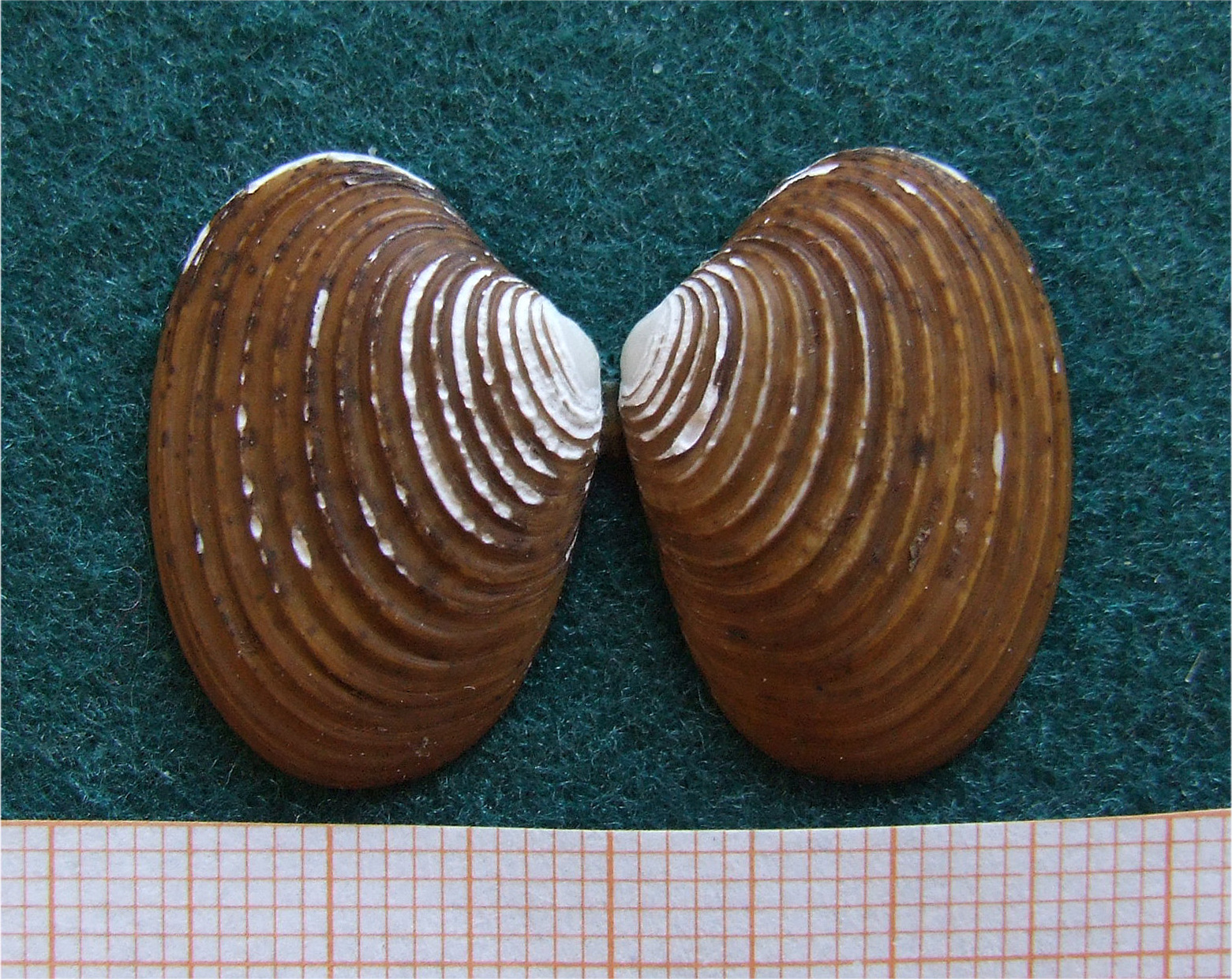
- Shell of a modern Astarte bivalve
  Astarte
  - †Astarte cuneiformis
  - †Astarte exaltata
  - †Astarte marylandica
  - †Astarte obruta
  - †Astarte perplana
  - †Astarte thisphila
  - †Astarte thomasi
  - †Astarte undata
- Asterias
  - †Asterias forbesi – or unidentified comparable form
- Astrangia
  - †Astrangia danae
- †Astrehelia
  - †Astrehelia palmata
- †Astrhelia
  - †Astrhelia plamata
- †Astroscopus
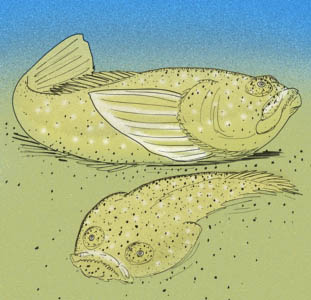
  - Life restoration of the Miocene stargazer Astroscopus countermani
    †Astroscopus countermani – type locality for species
- Astyris
  - †Astyris communis
  - †Astyris lunata
- Ataphrus
  - †Ataphrus glandula
- Athleta
  - †Athleta limopsis
  - †Athleta tuomeyi
- †Atopomys
  - †Atopomys texensis
- Atrina
  - †Atrina harrisi
  - †Atrina harrisii
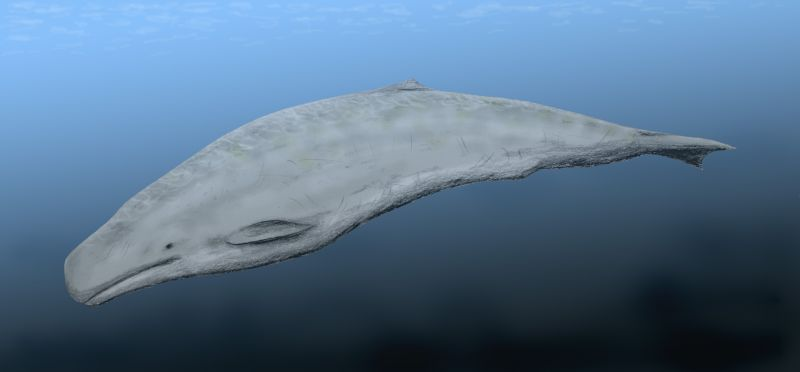
- Life restoration of the Miocene sperm whale Aulophyseter
  †Aulophyseter
  - †Aulophyseter mediatlanticus – type locality for species

== B ==
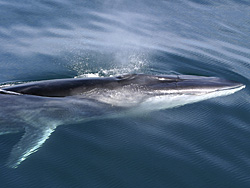
- Portrait of a living Balaenoptera baleen whale
  Balaenoptera
  - †Balaenoptera cephalus
  - †Balaenoptera pusilla – type locality for species
- Balanus
  - †Balanus concabvus
  - †Balanus concava
  - †Balanus crenatus
  - †Balanus imitator
  - †Balanus vulcanellus – type locality for species
- Bankia
  - †Bankia gouldi
- Barnea
  - †Barnea costata
- Bathytormus
  - †Bathytormus alaeformis
- †Batiacasphaera
  - †Batiacasphaera sphaerica
- †Belosphys
- Bicorbula
  - †Bicorbula idonea
- Blarina
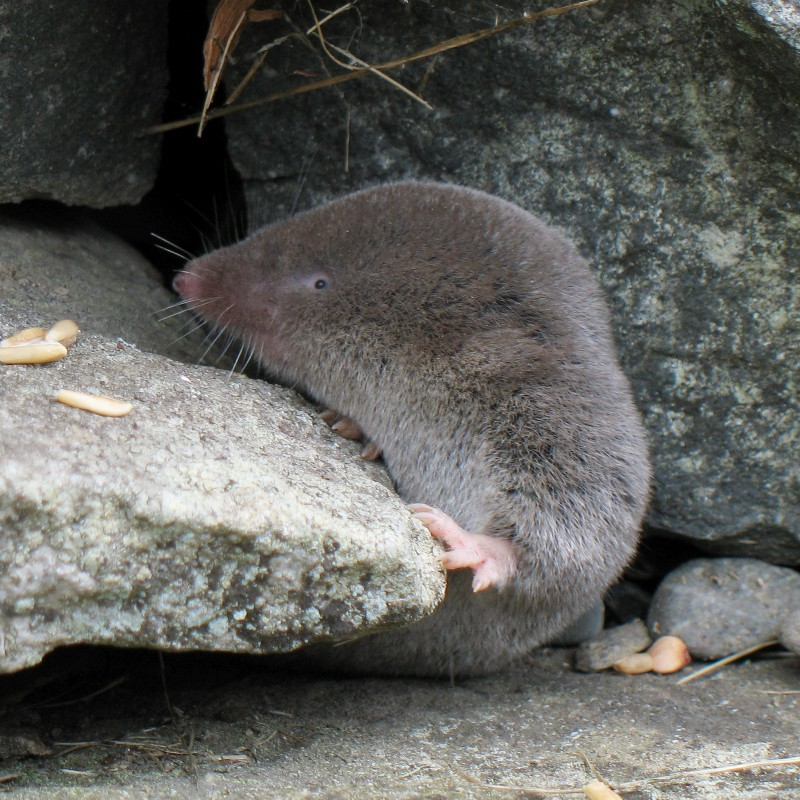
  - A living Blarina brevicauda, or northern short-tailed shrew
    †Blarina brevicauda
  - †Blarina carolinensis
- †Bolis – or unidentified comparable form
- Bonasa
  - †Bonasa umbellus
- Boreotrophon
  - †Boreotrophon harasewychi – type locality for species
- Brachidontes
  - †Brachidontes potomacensis
- †Brachyprotoma
  - †Brachyprotoma obtusata
- †Brevirostrodelphis
  - †Brevirostrodelphis dividum – type locality for species
- †Brevoortia
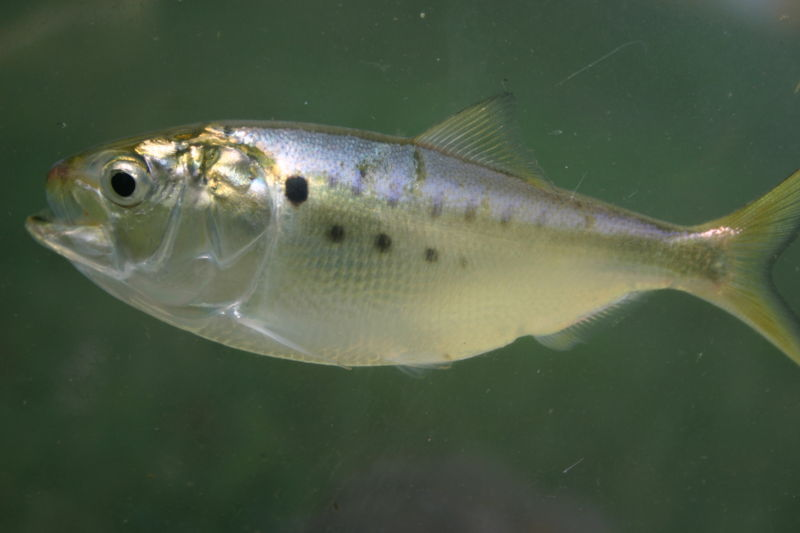
  - A living Brevoortia tyrannus, or Atlantic menhaden
    †Brevoortia tyrannus – or unidentified comparable form
- Buccinofusus
  - †Buccinofusus chesapeakensis
  - †Buccinofusus parilis
- Bufo
  - †Bufo americanus
  - †Bufo woodhousei
- †Bulliopsis
  - †Bulliopsis marylandica
  - †Bulliopsis quadrata
- Busycon – type locality for genus
  - †Busycon carica
  - †Busycon fusiforme
  - †Busycon fusiformis
- †Busycotyphus
  - †Busycotyphus coronatum
  - †Busycotyphus rugosum
- Busycotypus
  - †Busycotypus alveatum
  - †Busycotypus asheri – type locality for species
  - †Busycotypus canaliculatus
  - †Busycotypus coronatum
  - †Busycotypus rugosum

== C ==
- Cadulus
  - †Cadulus bellulus
  - †Cadulus newtonensis
  - †Cadulus thallus
- Caecum
  - †Caecum patuxentium
- †Calianassa
  - †Calianassa atlantica
  - †Calianassa matsoni – or unidentified comparable form
- Callinectes
  - †Callinectes ornatus
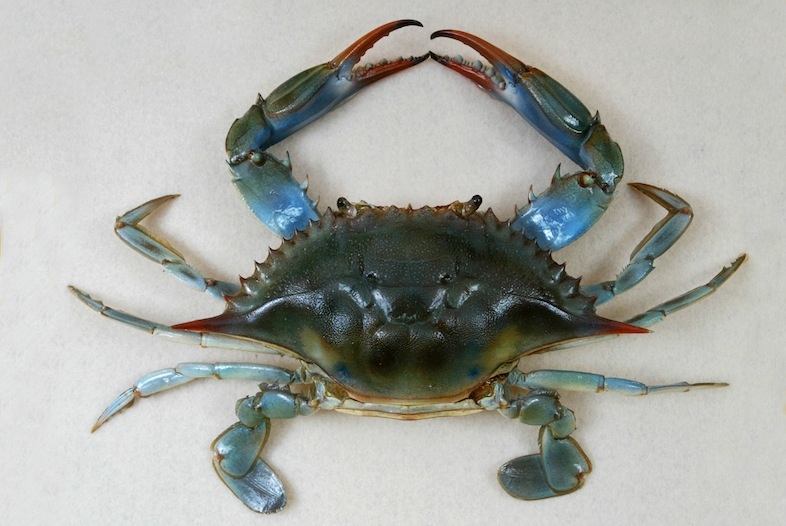
  - A living Callinectes sapidus, or Chesapeake blue crab
    †Callinectes sapidus
- Calliostoma
  - †Calliostoma alphelium
  - †Calliostoma aphelium
  - †Calliostoma humile – or unidentified comparable form
  - †Calliostoma philanthropus
  - †Calliostoma philathropus
- Callista
  - †Callista marylandica
- Callocardia
  - †Callocardia catharia
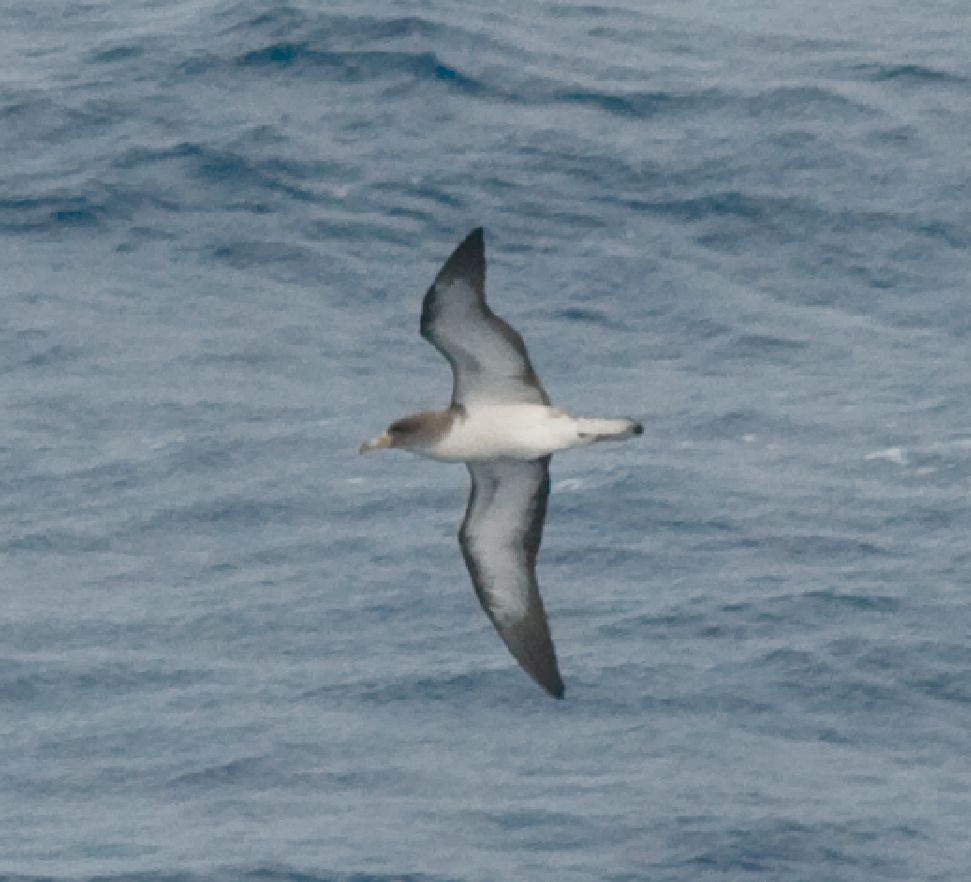
- A living Calonectris shearwater
  Calonectris
- Calyptraea
  - †Calyptraea aldrichi – type locality for species
  - †Calyptraea centralis
- †Calyptraphorus
  - †Calyptraphorus jacksoni
- Cancellaria
  - †Cancellaria alternata
- Cancer
  - †Cancer irroratus
- Canis
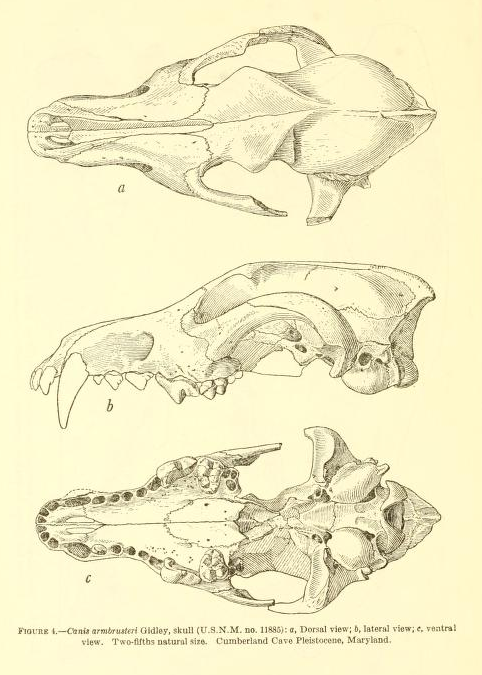
  - Illustration in multiple views of a fossilized skull of the Pleistocene Canis armbrusteri, or Armbruster's wolf
    †Canis armbrusteri – type locality for species
  - †Canis latrans
  - †Canis rufus – or unidentified comparable form
- Cantharus
  - †Cantharus marylandicus
- †Carassatellites
  - †Carassatellites turgidulus
- Carcharhinus
  - †Carcharhinus egertoni
- Carcharias
  - †Carcharias collata – type locality for species
- Carcharodon
  - †Carcharodon auriculatus
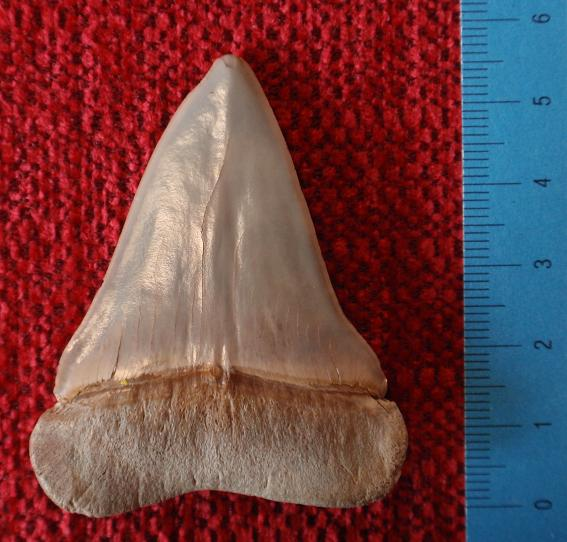
  - Fossilized tooth of the Miocene-Pliocene shark Cosmopolitodus hastalis, or broad-toothed mako
    †Carcharodon hastalis
- Cardita
  - †Cardita protracta
- †Caricella
- Carphophis
  - †Carphophis amoenus
- Caryocorbula
  - †Caryocorbula cuneata
  - †Caryocorbula inaqualis
- Cassis
- Castor
  - †Castor canadensis
- Catapleura
  - †Catapleura repanda – type locality for species
- †Cephalotropis – type locality for genus
  - †Cephalotropis coronatus – type locality for species
- Cerastoderma
  - †Cerastoderma leptopleurum
- Cervus
- †Cetophis – type locality for genus
  - †Cetophis heteroclitus – type locality for species
- Cetorhinus
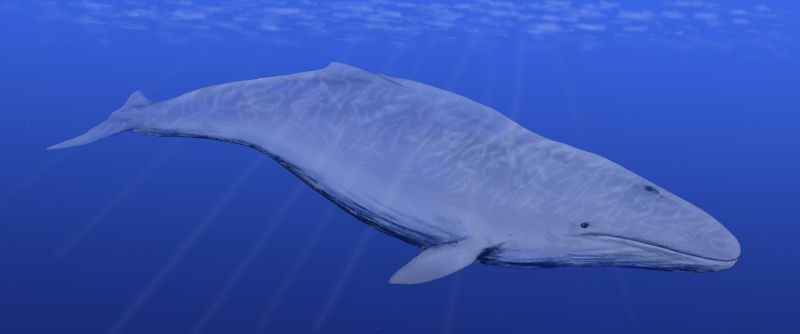
- Life restoration of the Miocene-Pliocene whale Cetotherium
  †Cetotherium
  - †Cetotherium megalophysum
  - †Cetotherium parvum – type locality for species
- Chama
  - †Chama corticosa
- Chelone
- Chelydra
  - †Chelydra serpentina
- †Chesacardium
  - †Chesacardium craticuloides
  - †Chesacardium laqueatum
- †Chesaclava – type locality for genus
  - †Chesaclava dissimilis
  - †Chesaclava quarlesi – type locality for species
- †Chesaconavus
  - †Chesaconavus chesapeakensis
  - †Chesaconavus rossi
- †Chesaconcavus
  - †Chesaconcavus chesapeakensis
  - †Chesaconcavus myosulcatus
  - †Chesaconcavus proteus
  - †Chesaconcavus rossi
  - †Chesaconcavus santamaria
- †Chesapecten
  - †Chesapecten coccymelus
  - †Chesapecten coccymeus
  - †Chesapecten covepointensis
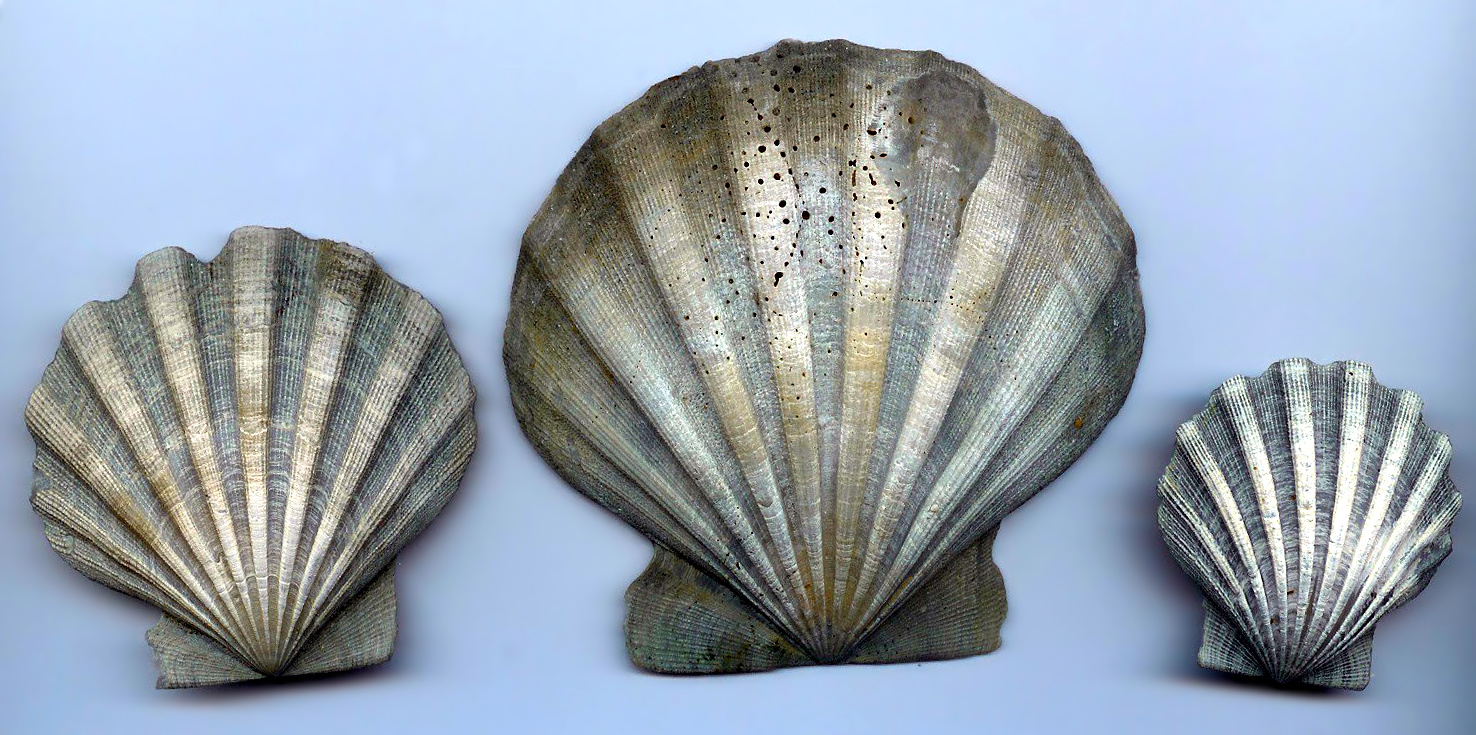
  - Shells of the Pliocene scallop Chesapecten jeffersonius
    †Chesapecten jeffersonius
  - †Chesapecten madisonius
  - †Chesapecten monicae
  - †Chesapecten nefrens
  - †Chesapecten santamaria
- †Chesasyrinx – type locality for genus
  - †Chesasyrinx rotifera
- †Chesatrophon – type locality for genus
  - †Chesatrophon chesapeakeanus – type locality for species
- Chlamys
  - †Chlamys choctavensis
  - †Chlamys sheldonae
- †Chloridella
  - †Chloridella empusa
- Chrysemys
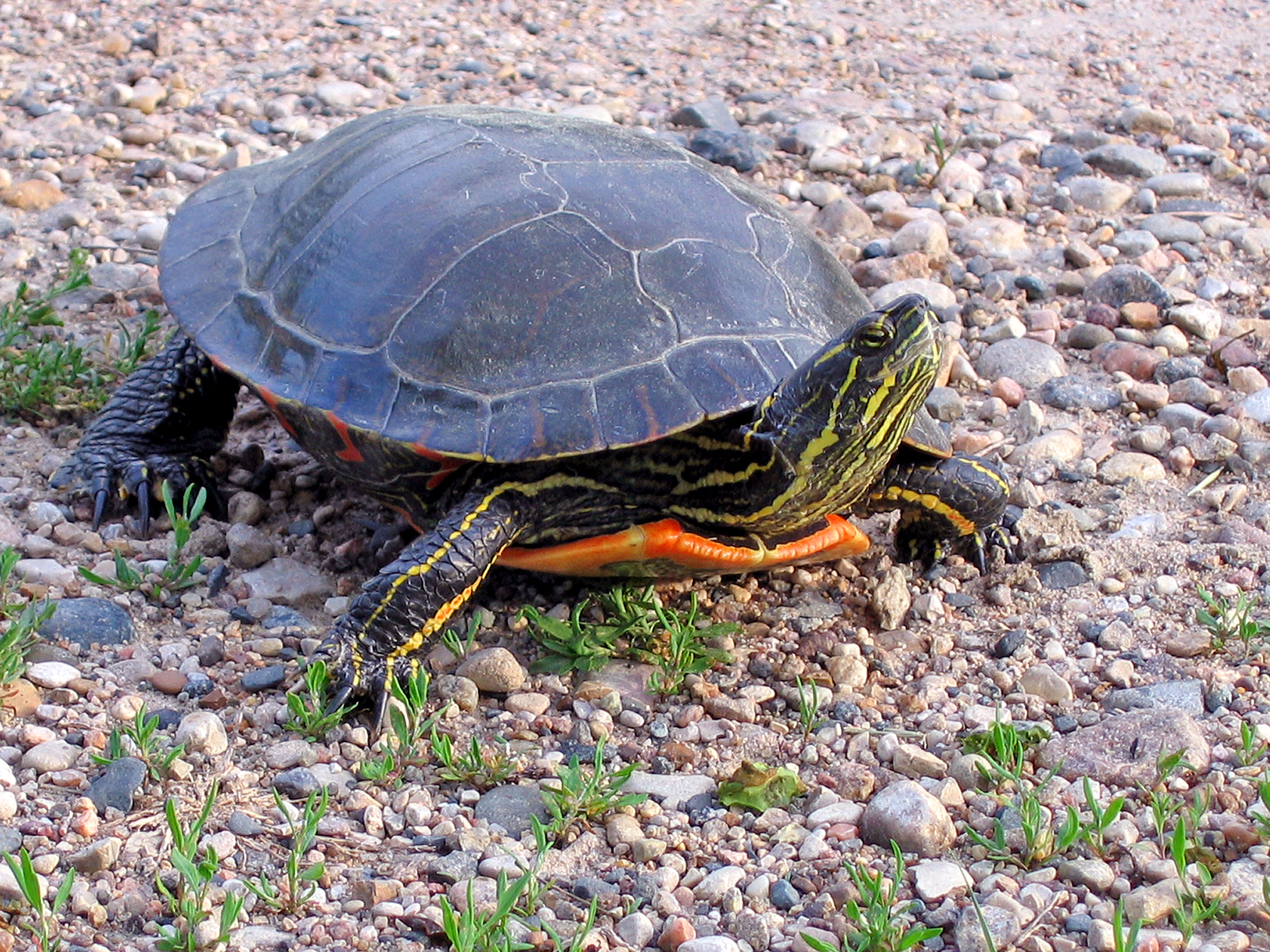
  - A living Chrysemys picta, or painted turtle
    †Chrysemys picta
- †Cimomia
  - †Cimomia marylandensis – type locality for species
- Circulus – report made of unidentified related form or using admittedly obsolete nomenclature
  - †Circulus form A informal
- Cirsotrema
  - †Cirsotrema form A informal
  - †Cirsotrema from B informal
- Clavus
- †Cleistophaeridium
  - †Cleistophaeridium placacanthum
- Clementia
  - †Clementia inoceriformis
- Clethrionomys
  - †Clethrionomys gapperi – or unidentified comparable form
- Cliona
  - †Cliona sulphurea
- †Clionia
  - †Clionia sulphurea
- Coluber
  - †Coluber constrictor
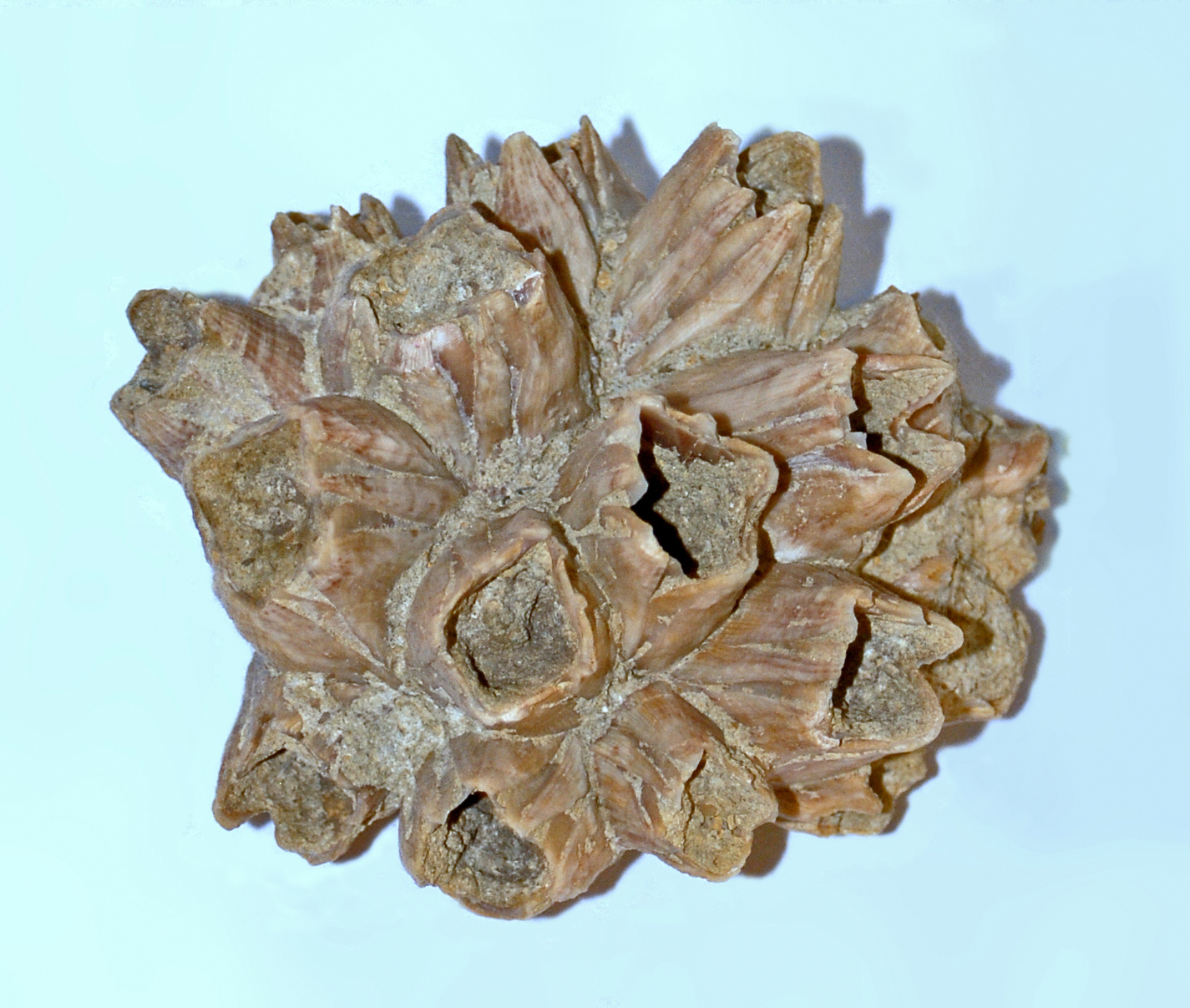
- Fossil of the Miocene-Pleistocene barnacle Concavus
  Concavus
  - †Concavus concavus
  - †Concavus crassostricola
- Condylura
  - †Condylura cristata
- Conopeum
  - †Conopeum germanum
- Conus
  - †Conus deluvianus
  - †Conus diluvianus
  - †Conus sanctaemariae – type locality for species
- Coralliophaga
  - †Coralliophaga bryani
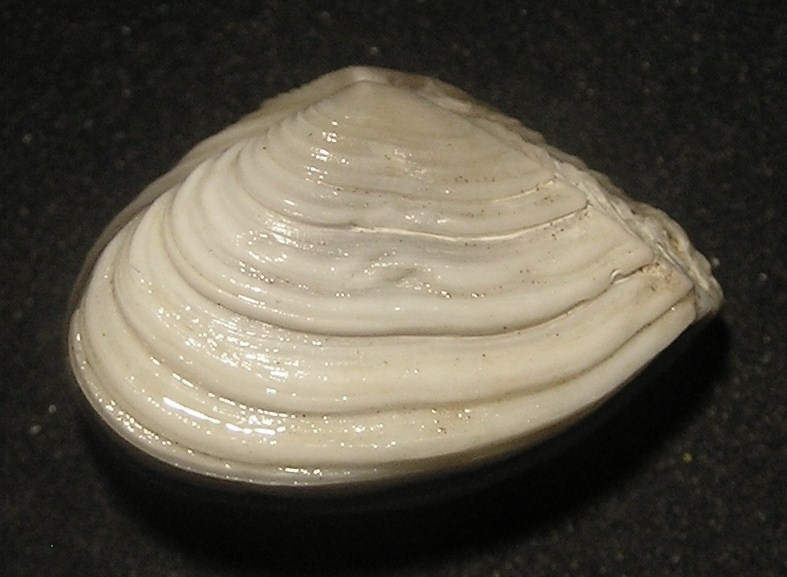
- Shell of a Corbula basket clam
  Corbula
  - †Corbula elevata
  - †Corbula inaequalis
  - †Corbula pectorosa – type locality for species
- †Coronia
- Crassatella
  - †Crassatella aquiana
  - †Crassatella marylandica
  - †Crassatella melinus
- Crassostrea
  - †Crassostrea virginica
- Crenilabium – or unidentified comparable form
  - †Crenilabium elatum
- †Creonella
  - †Creonella obscuriplica – type locality for species
- Crepidula
  - †Crepidula fornicata
  - †Crepidula plana
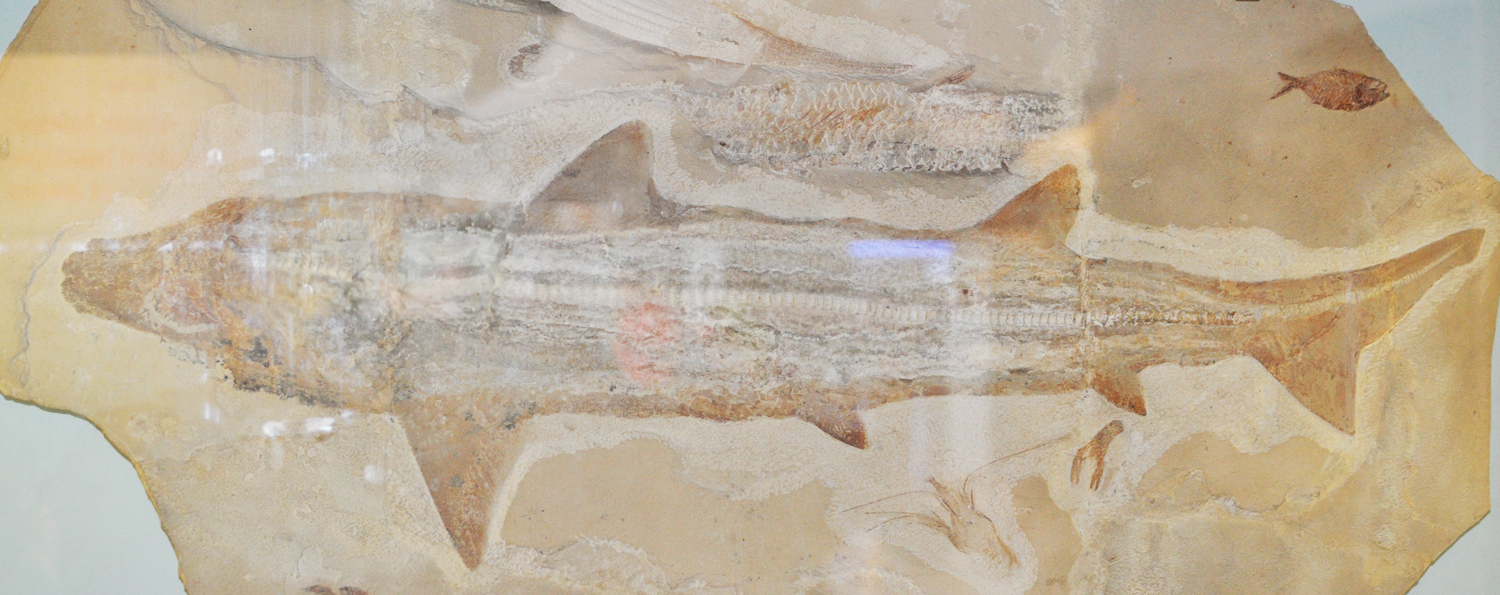
- Fossil of the Early Cretaceous-Eocene shark Cretolamna
  †Cretolamna
  - †Cretolamna appendiculata
- Crotalus
  - †Crotalus horridus
- Crucibulum
  - †Crucibulum constrictum
  - †Crucibulum costata
  - †Crucibulum multilineatum
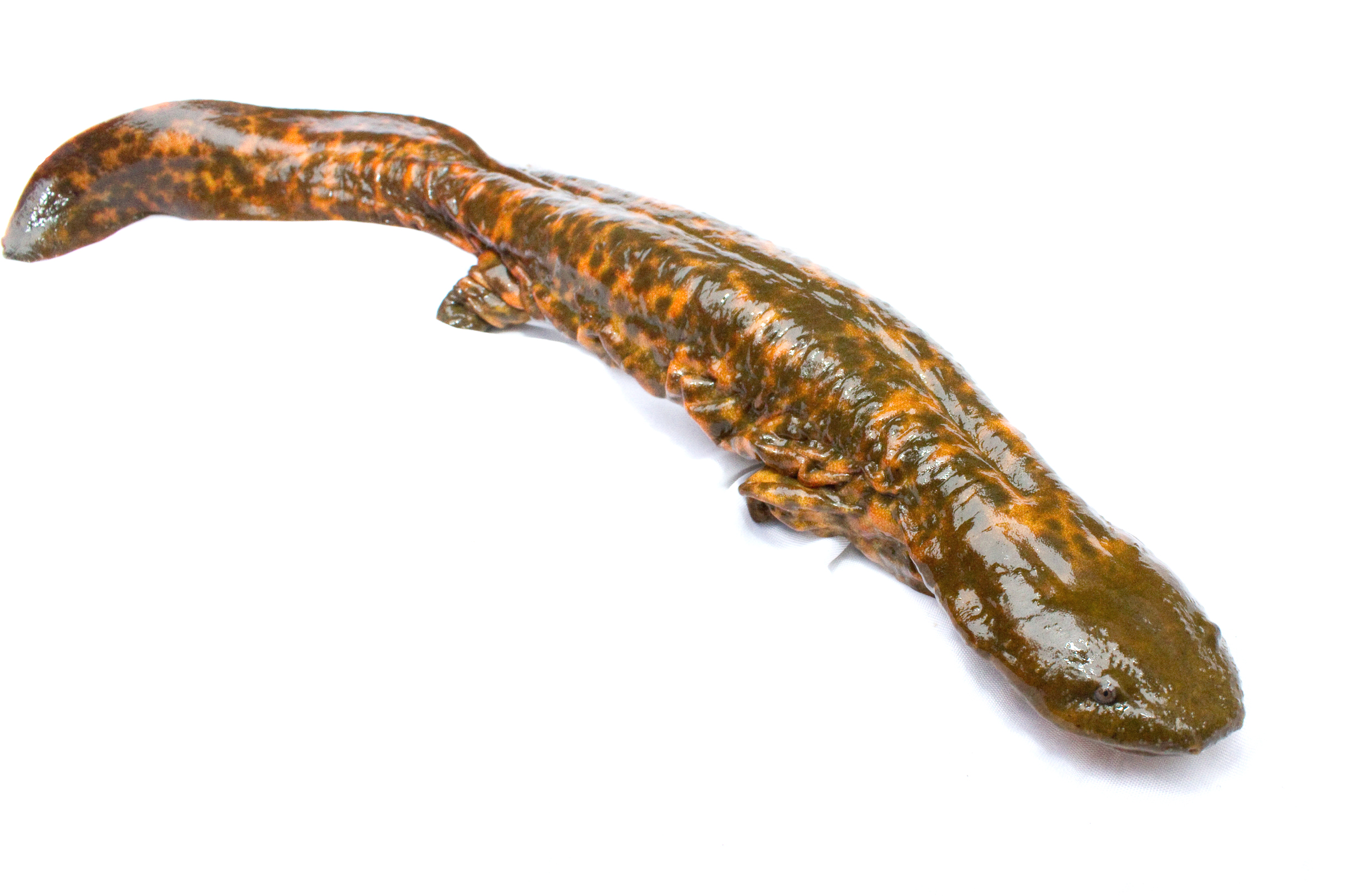
- A living Cryptobranchus alleganiensis, or hellbender salamander
  Cryptobranchus
  - †Cryptobranchus guildayi – type locality for species
- Cucullaea
  - †Cucullaea gigantea
  - †Cucullaea transversa
- Cumingia
  - †Cumingia tellinoides
- †Cybium
- Cyclocardia
  - †Cyclocardia granulata
- †Cyclopsiella
  - †Cyclopsiella lusatica
- Cyclostremiscus
  - †Cyclostremiscus sohli – type locality for species
- Cylichna
  - †Cylichna venusta – type locality for species
- Cymatosyrinx
  - †Cymatosyrinx mariana – type locality for species
- †Cynarctus
  - †Cynarctus marylandica – type locality for species
  - †Cynarctus wangi – type locality for species
- †Cynorca – tentative report
- Cypraea
- Cyrtopleura
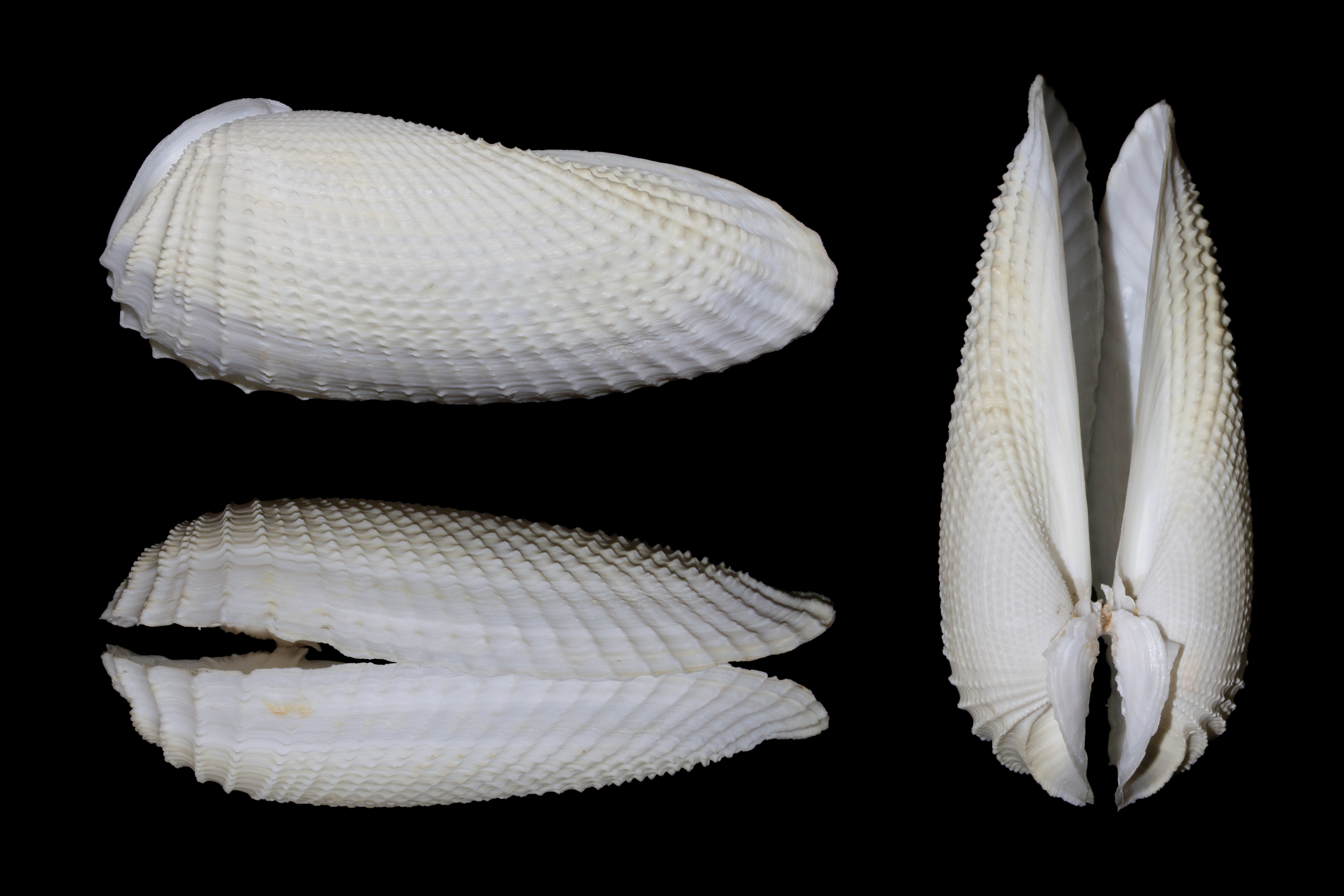
  - Shell in multiple views of a Cyrtopleura costata, or angel wing clam
    †Cyrtopleura costata
- Cythara
- †Cythereis
  - †Cythereis tuberculata
- Cytheridea
  - †Cytheridea punctillata
- †Cytheris
  - †Cytheris tuberculata

== D ==
- †Dallarca
  - †Dallarca elevata
  - †Dallarca elnia
  - †Dallarca idonea
  - †Dallarca staminea
  - †Dallarca subrostrata
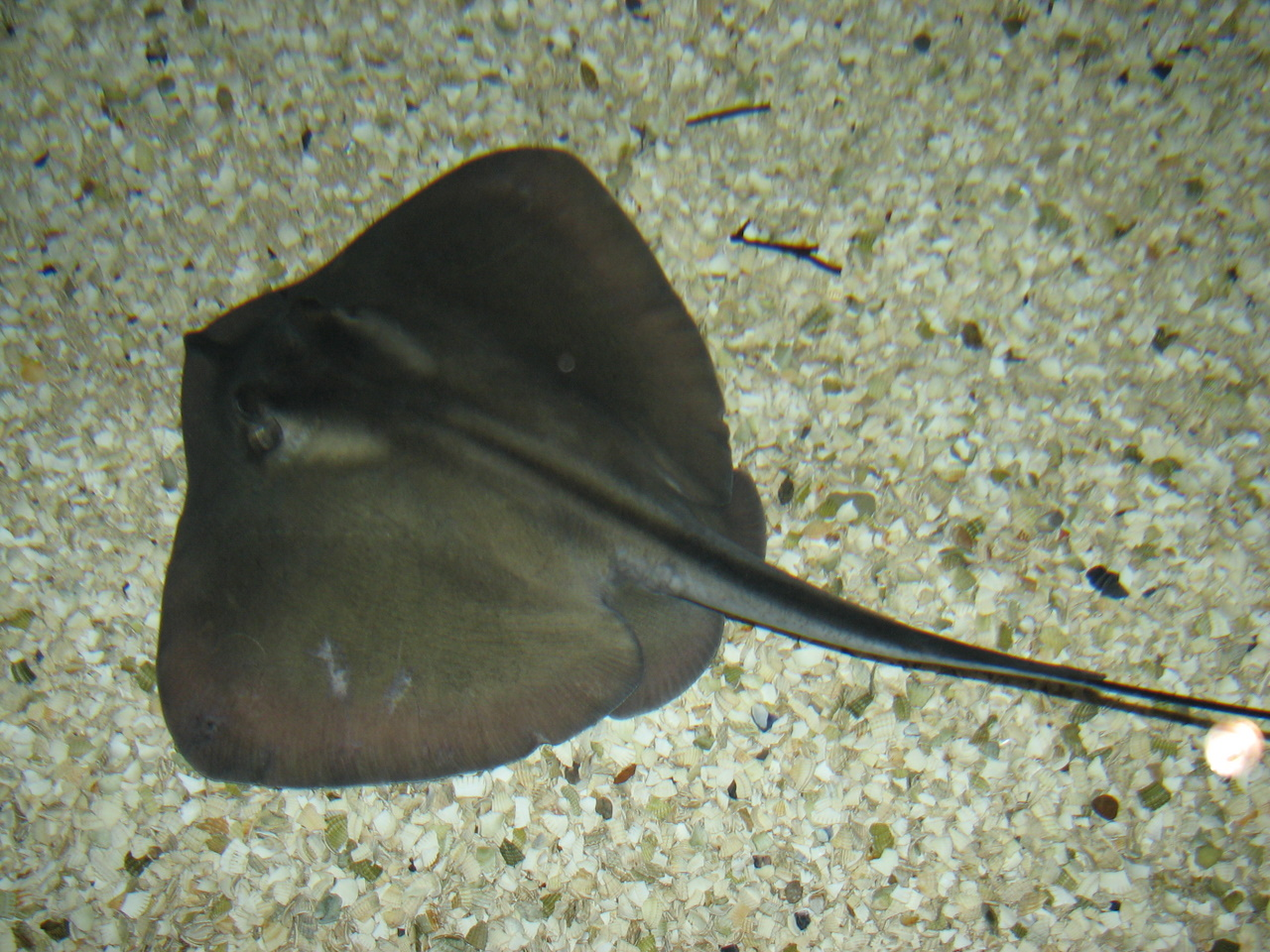
- A living Dasyatis stingray
  Dasyatis
  - †Dasyatis centrourus – or unidentified comparable form
- †Delphinodon
  - †Delphinodon leidyi
- Dentalium
  - †Dentalium attenuatum
- †Desmathyus
- Diadophis
  - †Diadophis punctatus
- Diodora
  - †Diodora griscomi
  - †Diodora marlboroensis
  - †Diodora marylandica
  - †Diodora marylandicus
  - †Diodora nassula
  - †Diodora redimicula
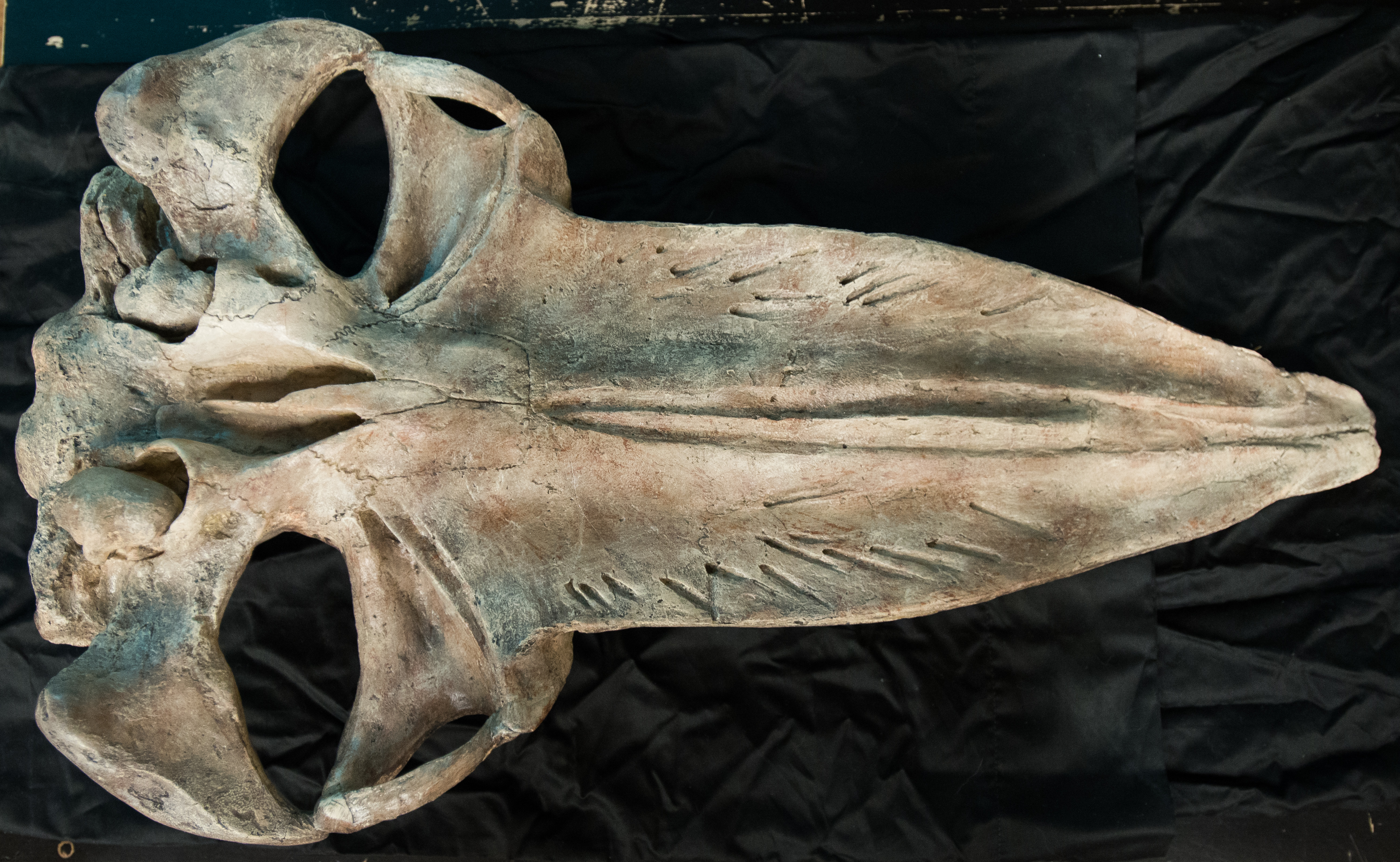
- Underside of the reconstructed cranium of the Miocene baleen whale Diorocetus
  †Diorocetus – type locality for genus
  - †Diorocetus hiatus – type locality for species
- Diplodonta
  - †Diplodonta marlboroensis
  - †Diplodonta subvexa
- †Dipoides
- Discinisca
  - †Discinisca lugubris
  - †Discinisca lugubrius
- Divalinga
  - †Divalinga quadrisulcata
- †Dolicholatirus
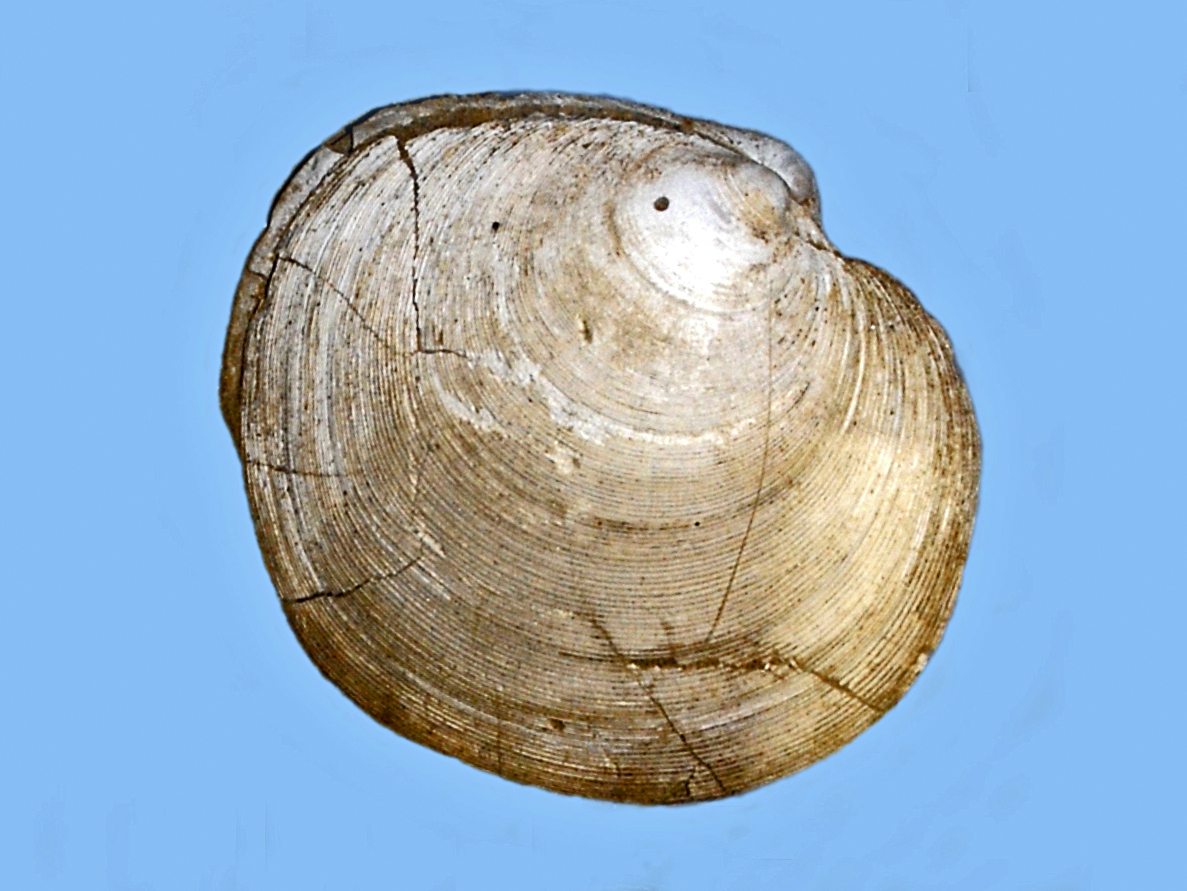
- Fossil shell of the Cretaceous-modern marine venus clam Dosinia
  Dosinia
  - †Dosinia acetabulum
- †Dosiniopsis
  - †Dosiniopsis lenticularis

== E ==
- †Eburneopecten
  - †Eburneopecten cerinus – type locality for species
  - †Eburneopecten dalli
- Echinocardium
  - †Echinocardium marylandiense – type locality for species
- Echinophoria – type locality for genus
  - †Echinophoria caelatura
- †Ecphora
  - †Ecphora chesapeakensis – type locality for species
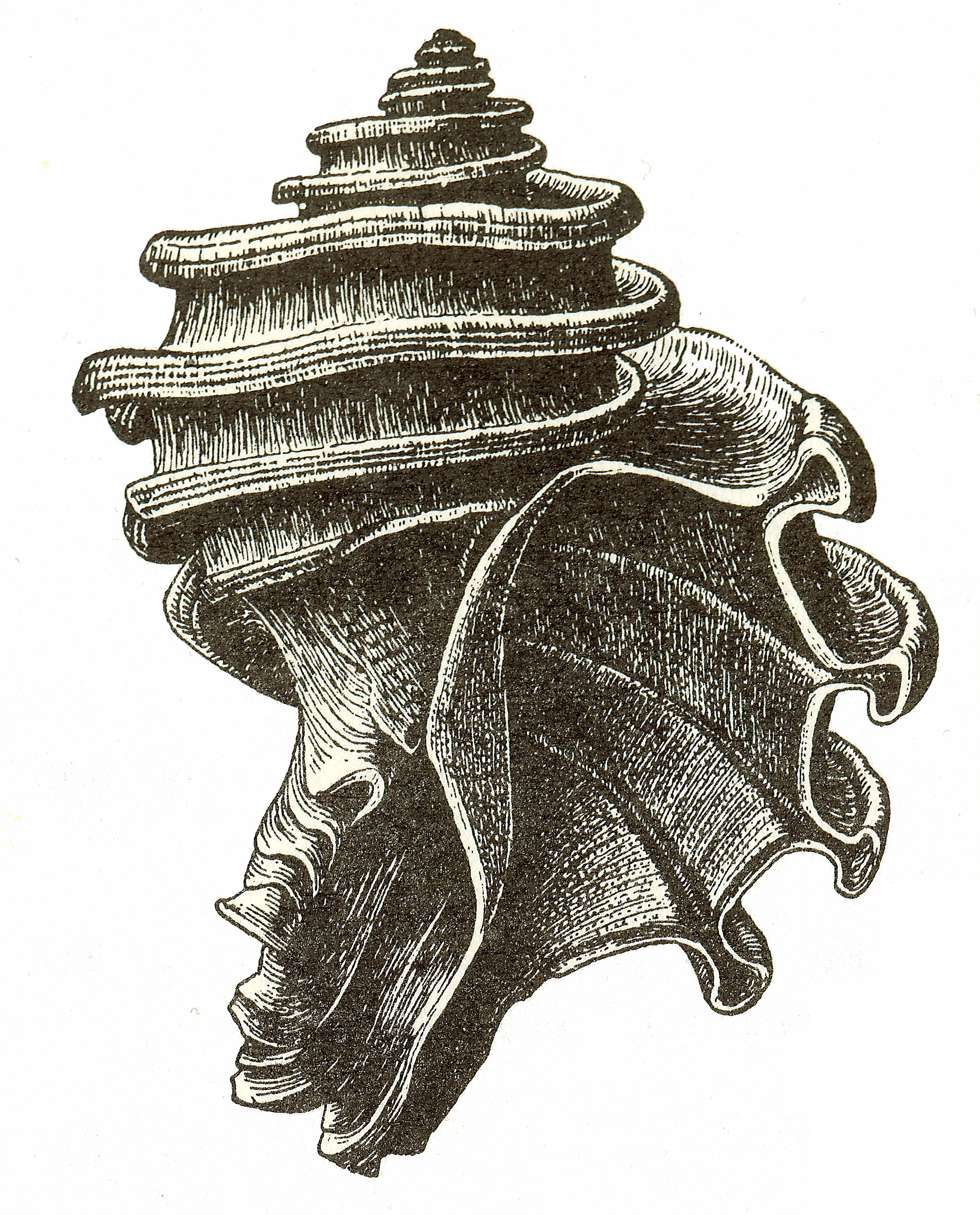
  - Illustration of a fossilized shell of the Miocene murex sea snail Ecphora gardnerae
    †Ecphora gardnerae
  - †Ecphora meganae
  - †Ecphora quadricostata
  - †Ecphora scientistensis
  - †Ecphora tampaensis
  - †Ecphora tricostata
  - †Ecphora turneri
- †Ectoganus
  - †Ectoganus gliriformis – or unidentified comparable form
- †Ectopistes
  - †Ectopistes migratorius
- Elaphe
  - †Elaphe vulpina
- Electra
  - †Electra monostachys
- Elphidium
  - †Elphidium discoidale
  - †Elphidium incertum
  - †Elphidium latispatium
- Ensis
  - †Ensis directus
  - †Ensis ensiformis
- †Entobia
- Entosolenia
  - †Entosolenia globosa
  - †Entosolenia lucida
- Eontia
  - †Eontia palmerae
  - †Eontia ponderosa
- †Eopleurotoma – or unidentified comparable form
  - †Eopleurotoma harrisi
  - †Eopleurotoma potomacensis
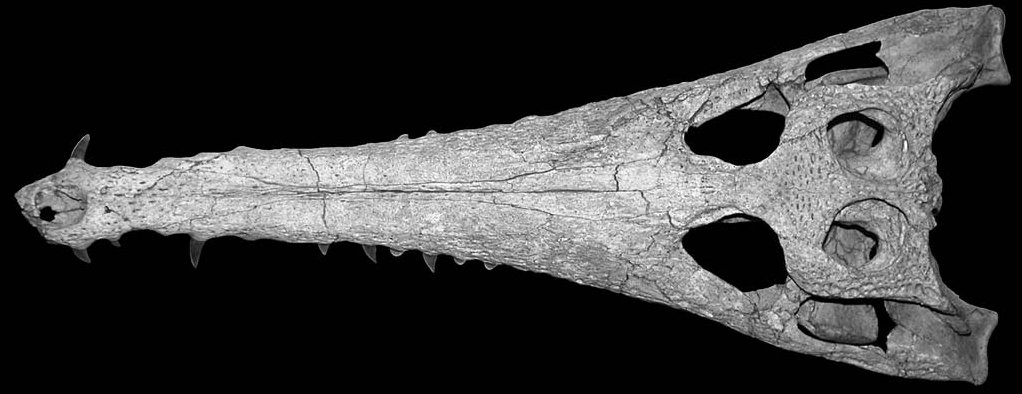
- Fossilized cranium in multiple views of the Paleocene-Eocene gavial relative Eosuchus
  †Eosuchus
  - †Eosuchus minor
- †Eosurcula – or unidentified comparable form
  - †Eosurcula ducateli
- Epitonium
  - †Epitonium angulatum
  - †Epitonium chancellorensis – type locality for species
  - †Epitonium denticulatum
  - †Epitonium humphreysii
  - †Epitonium multistriatum
  - †Epitonium rupicola
  - †Epitonium sayanum
- Eponides
  - †Eponides frigida
- Eptesicus
  - †Eptesicus fuscus – or unidentified comparable form
- Equus
  - †Equus complicatus
  - †Equus giganteus
- Erethizon
  - †Erethizon dorsatum
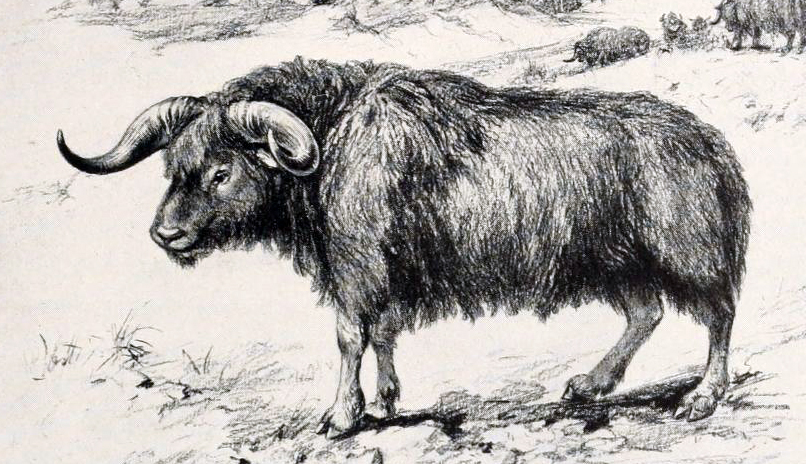
- Life restoration of the Pleistocene bovid Euceratherium, or the shrub ox. Robert Bruce Horsfall (1913).
  †Euceratherium
  - †Euceratherium collinum
- †Euclastes – tentative report
- Eucrassatella
  - †Eucrassatella melinus
- Eulima
  - †Eulima brightseatensis – type locality for species
  - †Eulima form A informal
- Eumeces
  - †Eumeces fasciatus – or unidentified comparable form
- Eupleura
  - †Eupleura caudata
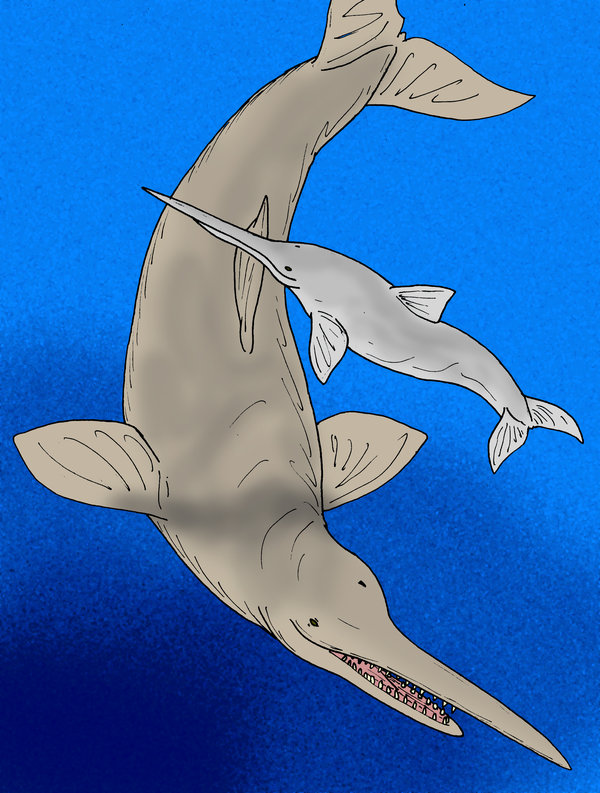
- Life restoration of the Miocene whale Eurhinodelphis (above)
  †Eurhinodelphis
  - †Eurhinodelphis longirostris
- Euspira
  - †Euspira heros
  - †Euspira marylandica
  - †Euspira tuomeyi

== F ==
- Felis
  - †Felis couguar
- †Ficopsis
- Fissurella
  - †Fissurella fluviamariana – type locality for species
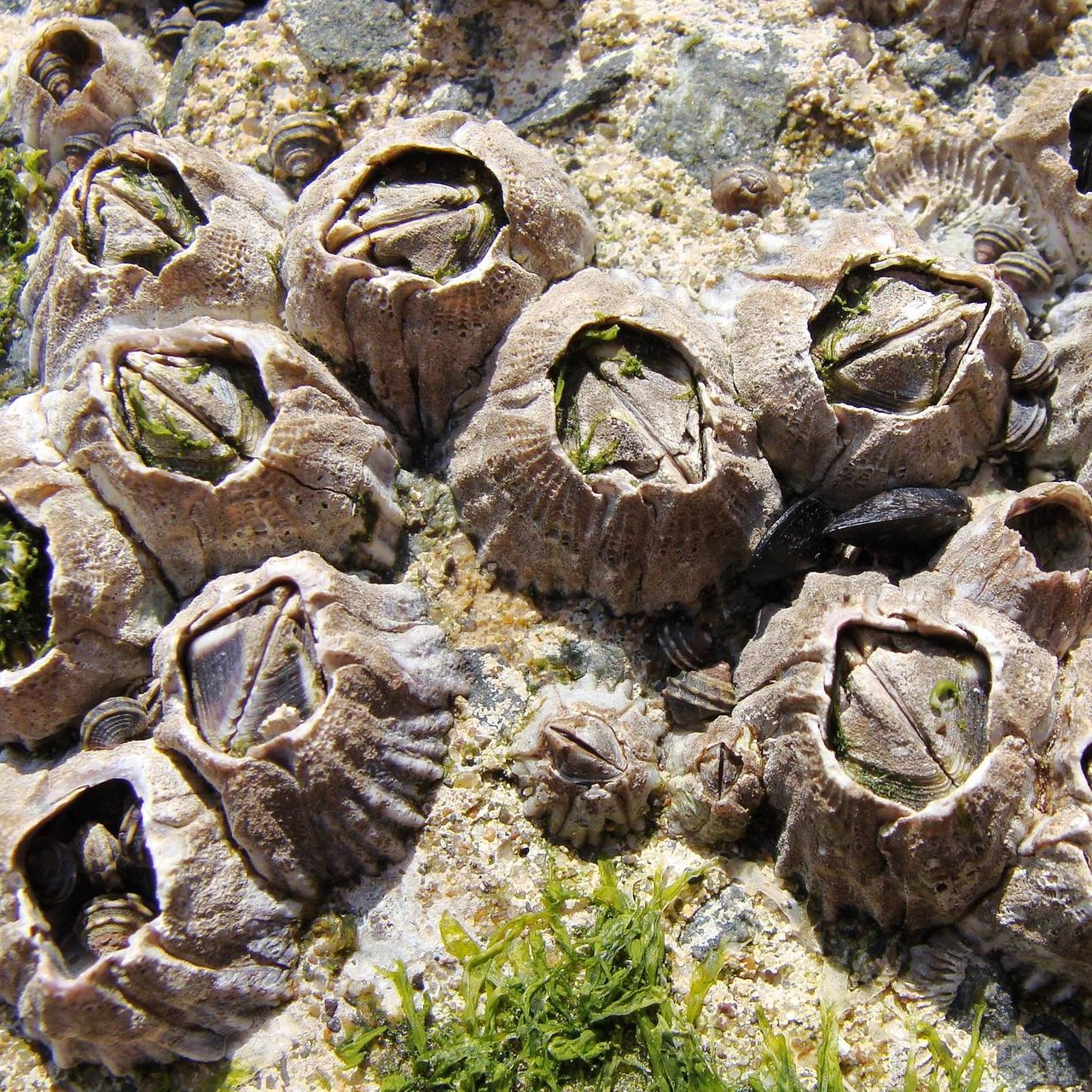
- Living Fistulobalanus barnacles
  †Fistulobalanus
  - †Fistulobalanus klemmi
- †Florilus
  - †Florilus chesapeakensis
- †Florimetis
  - †Florimetis biplicata
- †Fulgar
  - †Fulgar coronatum

== G ==
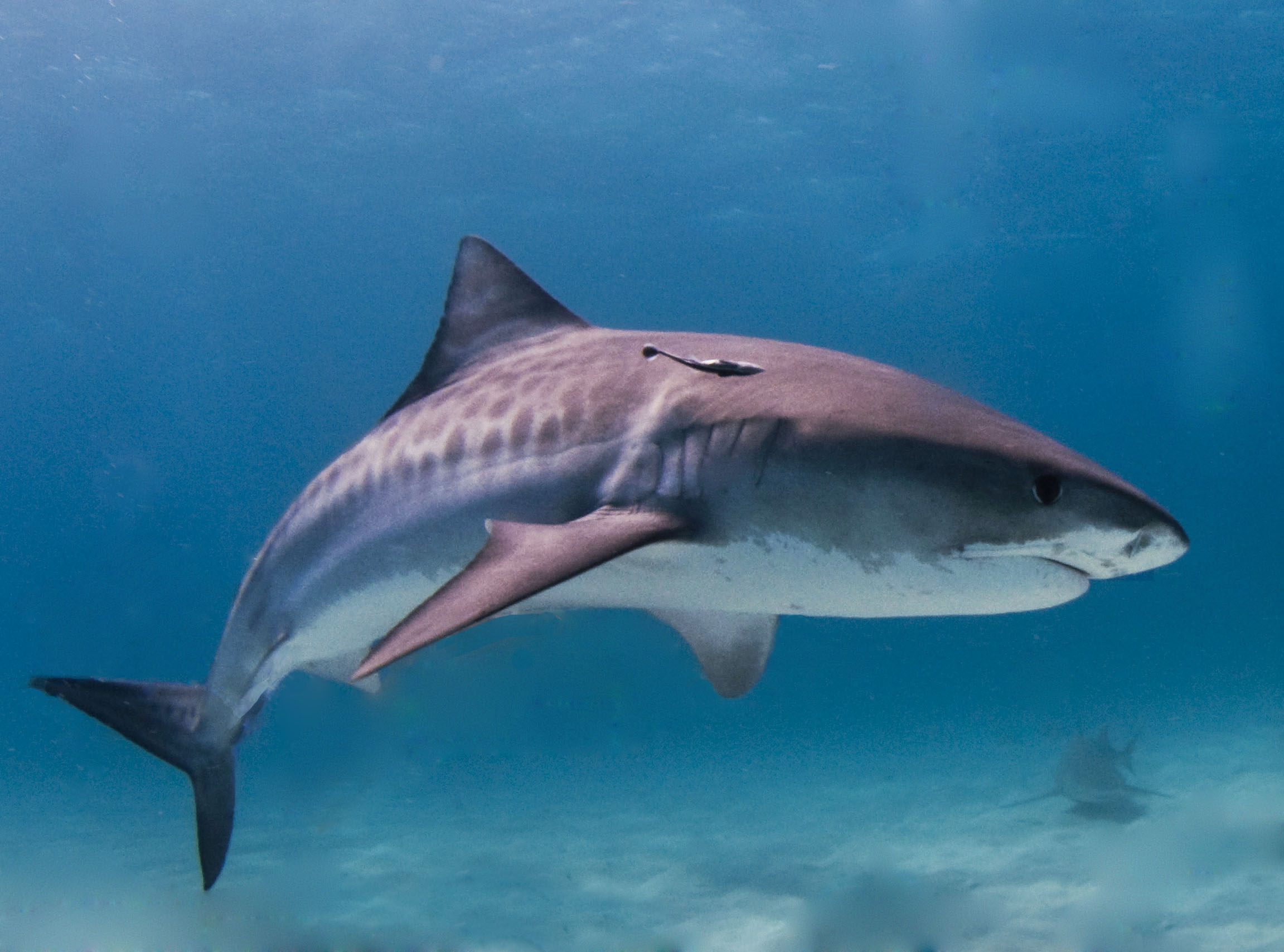
- A living Galeocerdo cuvier, or tiger shark
  Galeocerdo
  - †Galeocerdo aduncus
  - †Galeocerdo appendiculatus
  - †Galeocerdo contortus
  - †Galeocerdo latidens
- Galeodea
- Gari
  - †Gari gubernatoria
- Gastrochaena
- Gavia
  - †Gavia immer
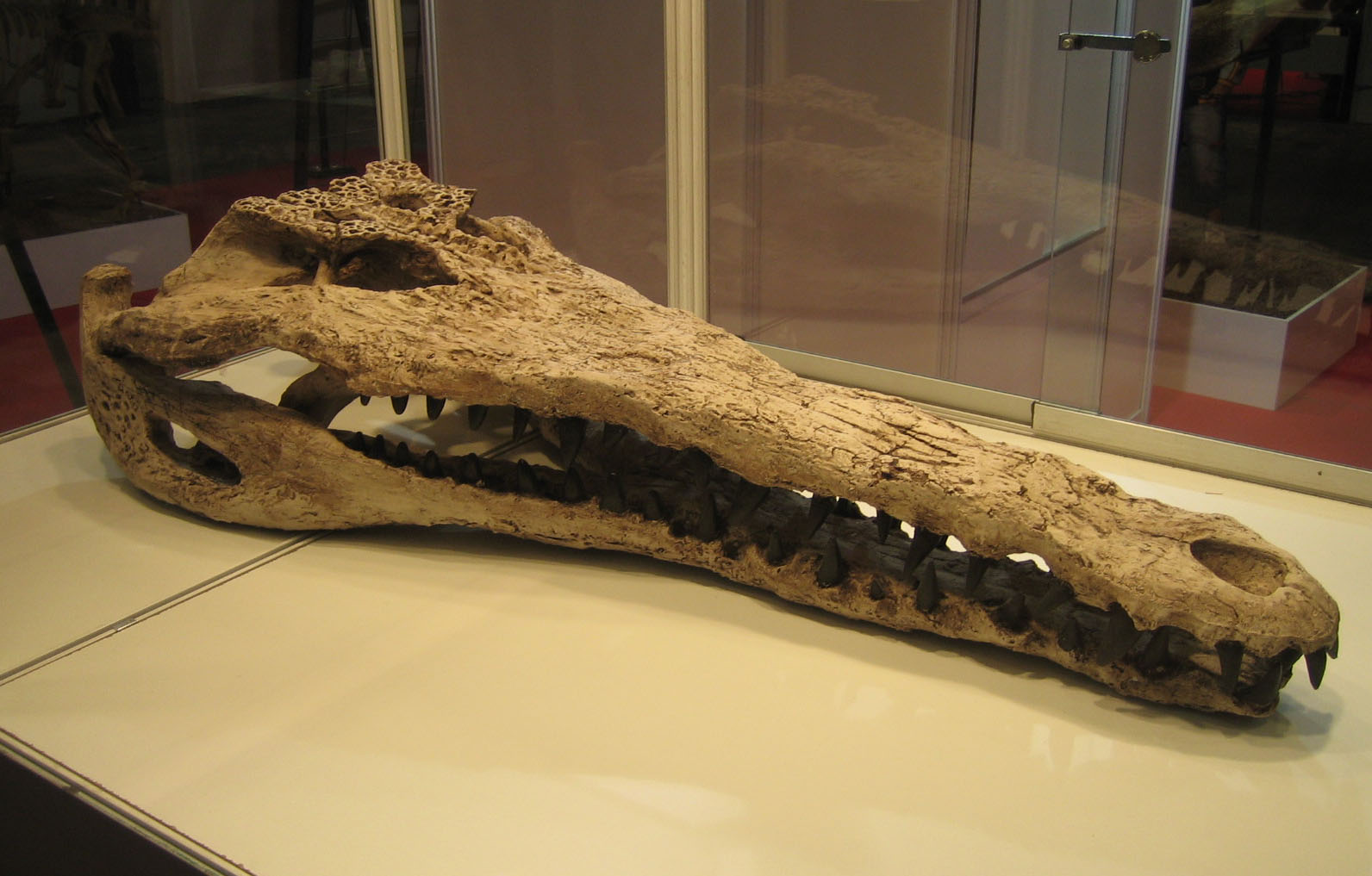
- Fossilized skull of the Miocene crocodile relative Gavialosuchus
  †Gavialosuchus
  - †Gavialosuchus antiquus
- Gegania
  - †Gegania marylandica
- Gemma
  - †Gemma gemma
- Genota – or unidentified comparable form
  - †Genota bellistriata
- Geukensia
  - †Geukensia demissa
- Gibbula – tentative report
  - †Gibbula glandula
- †Gilbertina
  - †Gilbertina texana
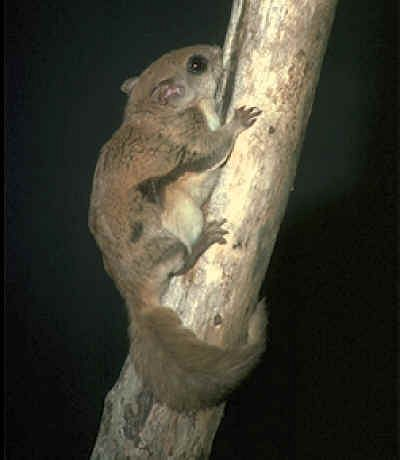
- A living Glaucomys, or New World flying squirrel
  Glaucomys
- Globigerina
  - †Globigerina praebulloides
- Globigerinoides
  - †Globigerinoides altiaperturus
  - †Globigerinoides sicanus
- †Globoquadrina
  - †Globoquadrina altispira
- Glossus
  - †Glossus fraterna
  - †Glossus ignolea – or unidentified comparable form
  - †Glossus markoei
  - †Glossus markoii
  - †Glossus marylandica
  - †Glossus mazlea
  - †Glossus santamaria
- Glycimeris
  - †Glycimeris parilis
- Glycymeris
  - †Glycymeris americana
  - †Glycymeris idonea
  - †Glycymeris lentiformis
  - †Glycymeris parilis
- Glyptemys
  - †Glyptemys muhlenbergii
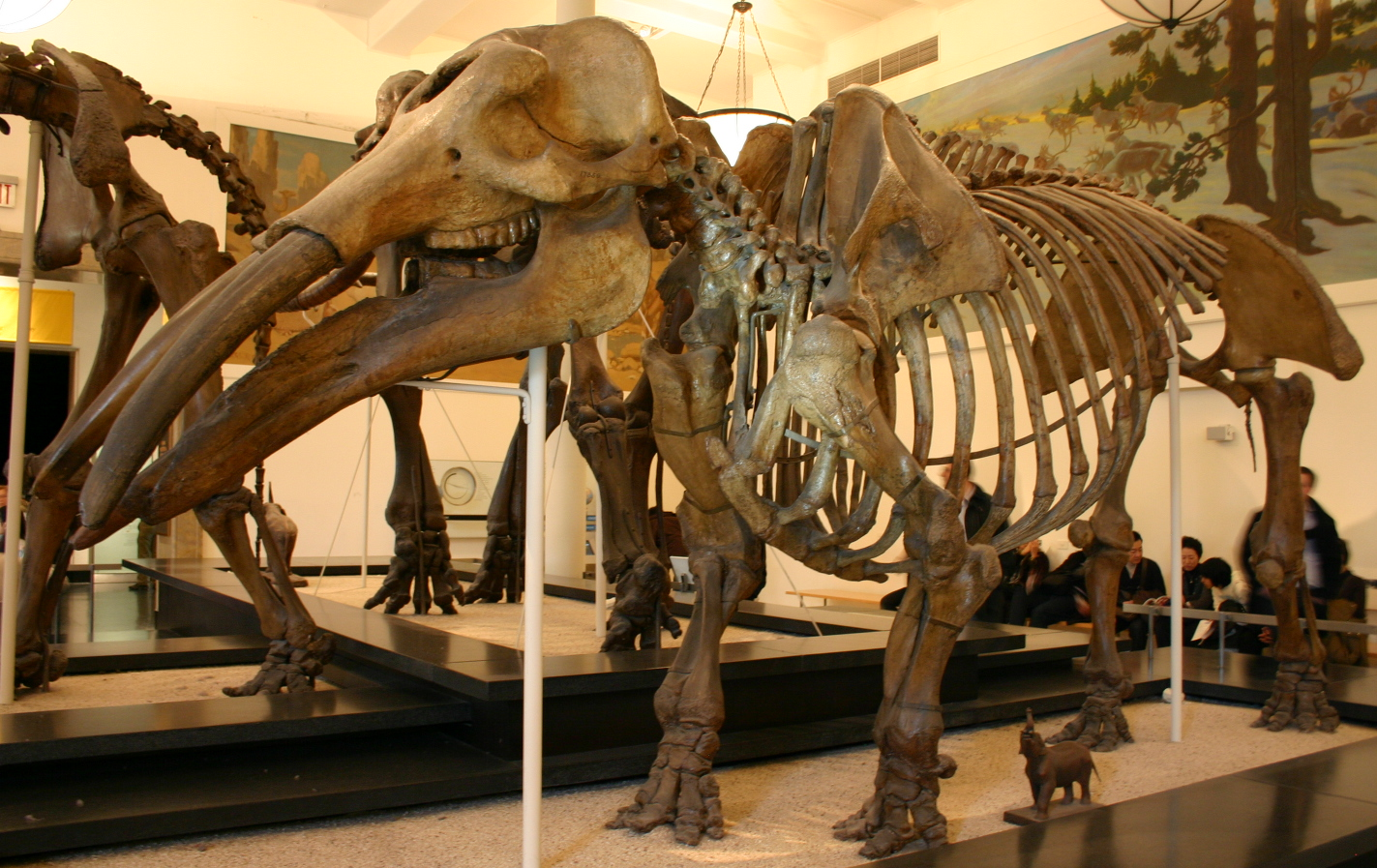
- Mounted fossilized skeleton of the Miocene-Pleistocene elephant relative Gomphotherium
  †Gomphotherium
  - †Gomphotherium obscurum – type locality for species
- †Gryphaeostrea
  - †Gryphaeostrea vomer
- Gulo
  - †Gulo gulo
- Gyrinophilus
  - †Gyrinophilus porphyriticus – or unidentified comparable form

== H ==
- †Habibacysta
  - †Habibacysta tectata
- †Hadrodelphis – type locality for genus
  - †Hadrodelphis calvertense – type locality for species
- †Halicetus – type locality for genus
  - †Halicetus ignotus – type locality for species
- Haminoea
  - †Haminoea solitaria
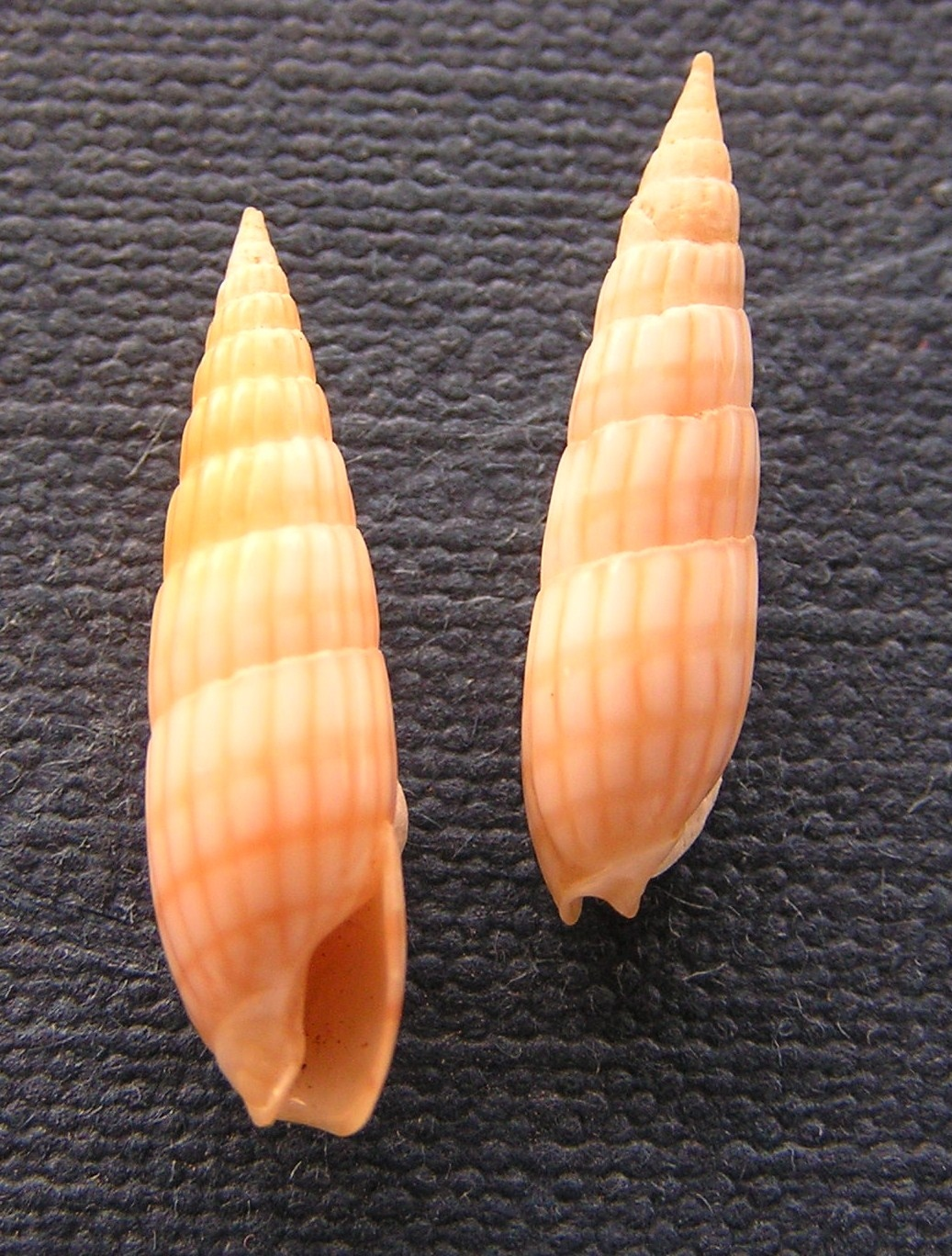
- Shells in differing orientations of Hastula augur sea snails
  Hastula
  - †Hastula inornata
  - †Hastula simplex
- Haustator
  - †Haustator form A informal
  - †Haustator gnoma – type locality for species
  - †Haustator premortoni – type locality for species
- †Heliadornis – type locality for genus
  - †Heliadornis ashbyi – type locality for species
- Hemimactra
  - †Hemimactra solidissima
  - †Hemimactra subparilis
- Hemipristis
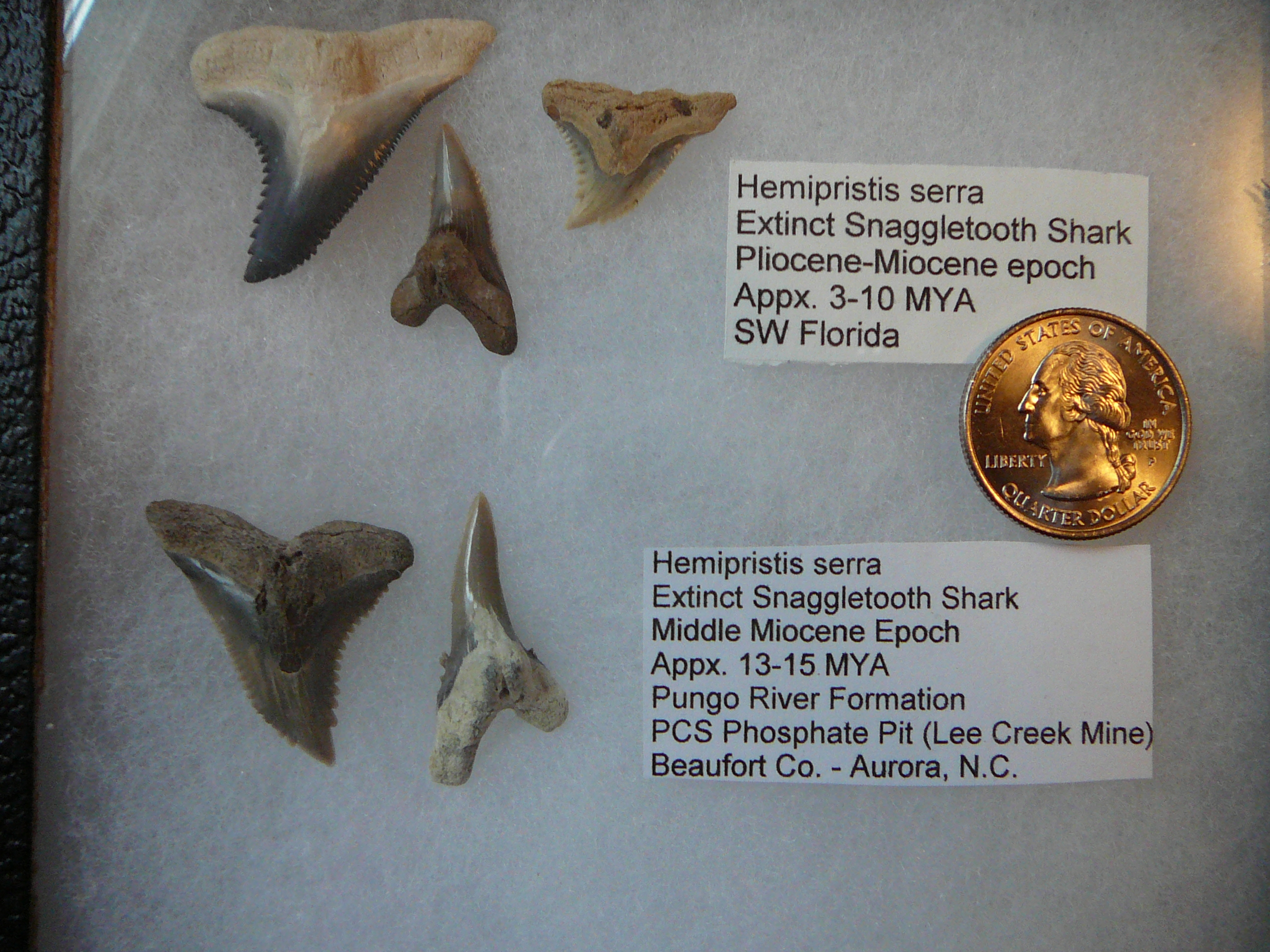
  - Fossilized teeth of the Miocene weasel shark Hemipristis serra
    †Hemipristis serra
- †Hercoglossa
  - †Hercoglossa tuomeyi – type locality for species
- †Hesperhys
- Heterodon
  - †Heterodon platyrhinos – or unidentified comparable form
- Hiatella
  - †Hiatella arctica
  - †Hiatella artica
- Hippoporidra
  - †Hippoporidra edax
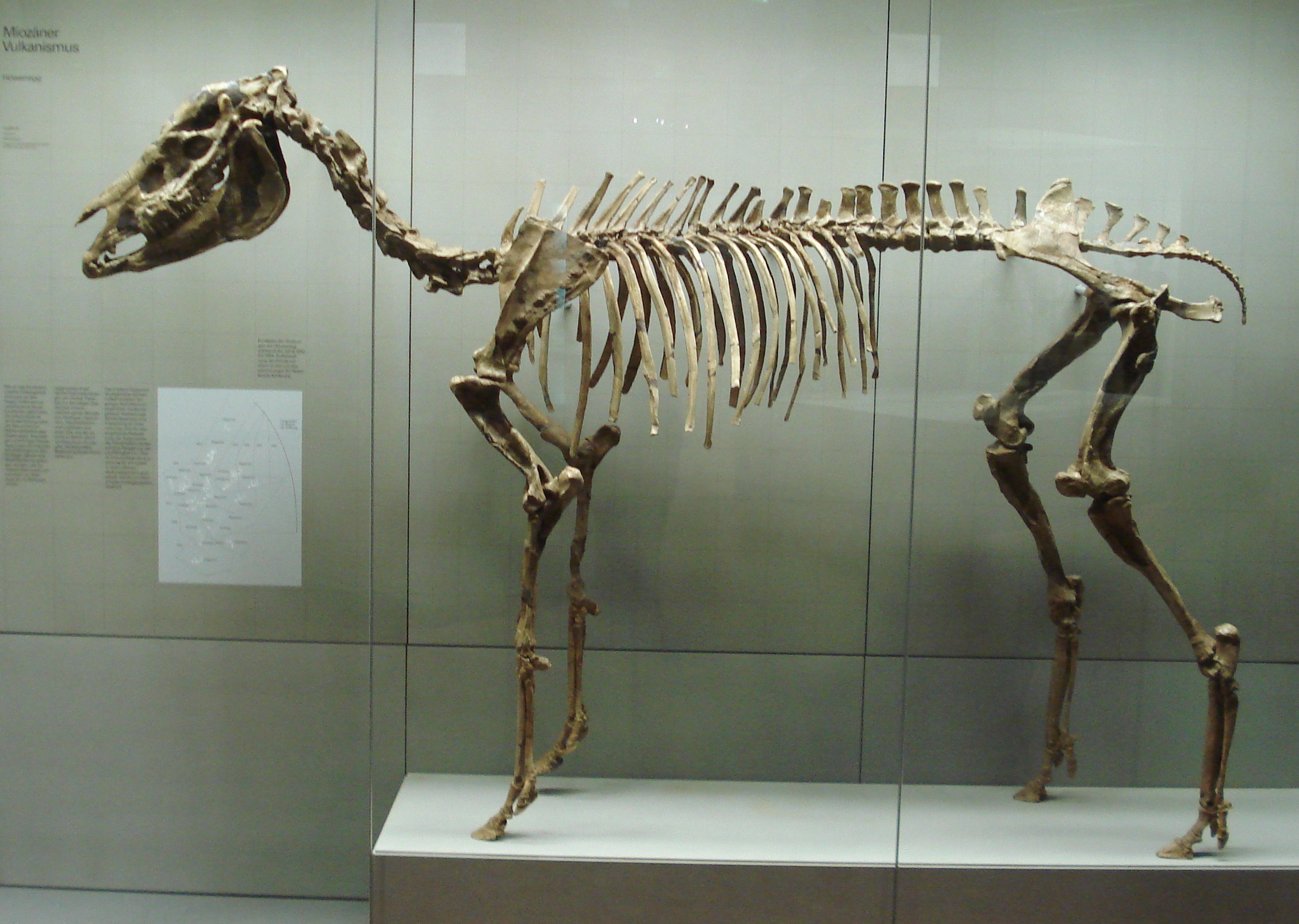
- Mounted fossilized skeleton of the Miocene-Pliocene horse Hippotherium
  †Hippotherium
- Hyla
  - †Hyla crucifer
- Hyotissa
  - †Hyotissa haitensis
- Hysteroconcha
  - †Hysteroconcha marylandica
  - †Hysteroconcha staminaea
- †Hystrichosphaeropsis
  - †Hystrichosphaeropsis obscura

== I ==
- Ictalurus
- Ilyanassa
  - †Ilyanassa obsoleta
  - †Ilyanassa trivittata
- Ischadium
  - †Ischadium recurvum
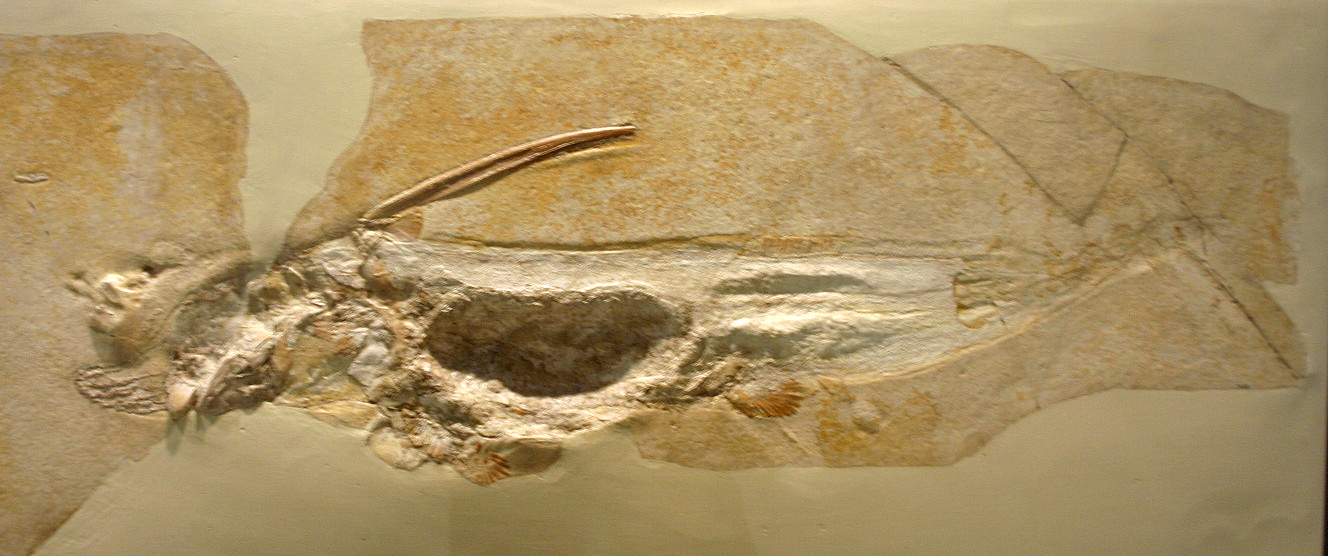
- Fossilized skeleton of the Middle Jurassic-Miocene Chimaera relative Ischyodus
  †Ischyodus
  - †Ischyodus williamsae – type locality for species
- Isognomon
  - †Isognomon maxillata
  - †Isognomon tortum
- Isurus
- †Ixacanthus – type locality for genus
  - †Ixacanthus coelospondylus – type locality for species

== J ==
- †Judithemys
  - †Judithemys kranzi – type locality for species

== K ==
- Kalolophus
  - †Kalolophus antillarum
- †Kapalmerella
  - †Kapalmerella mortoni
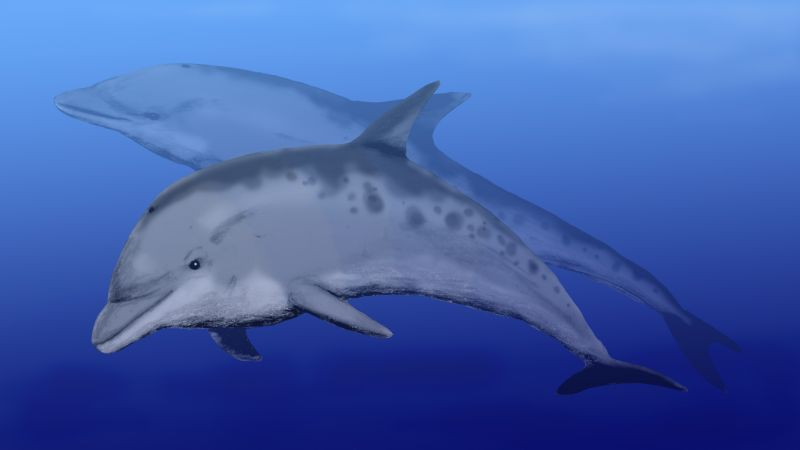
- Life restoration of the Oligocene-Miocene dolphin Kentriodon
  †Kentriodon – type locality for genus
  - †Kentriodon pernix – type locality for species
- †Kummelia
  - †Kummelia americana
- Kuphus – report made of unidentified related form or using admittedly obsolete nomenclature
- Kurtziella
  - †Kurtziella cerina

== L ==
- †Labyrinthodinium
  - †Labyrinthodinium truncatum
- †Lacinia
  - †Lacinia pygmaea – type locality for species
- Lacuna
  - †Lacuna feorra – type locality for species
- †Laevihastula – type locality for genus
  - †Laevihastula marylandica – type locality for species
  - †Laevihastula simplex
- †Lagodon
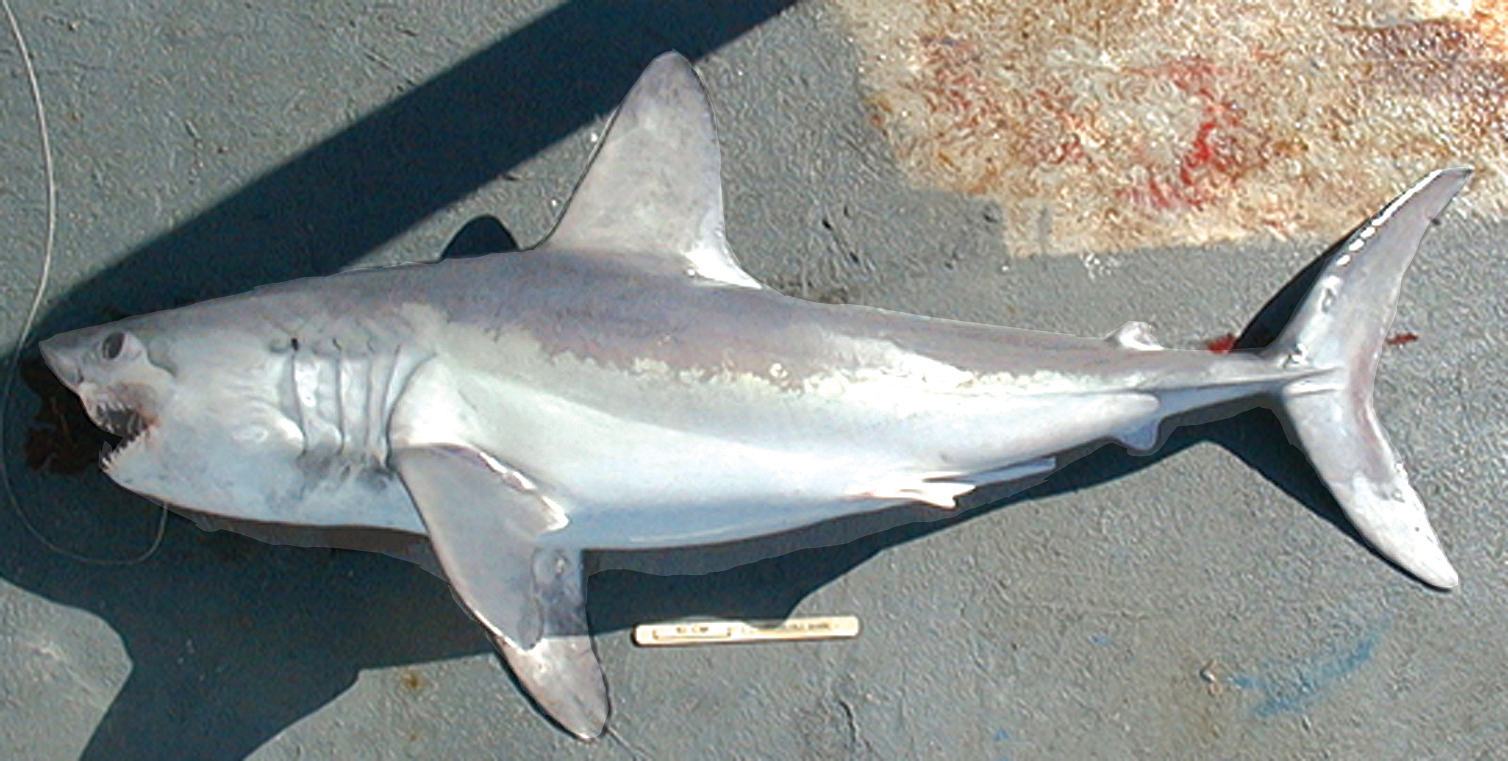
- A modern Lamna mackerel shark
  Lamna
  - †Lamna denticulata
  - †Lamna obliqua
  - †Lamna vincenti
- Lampropeltis
  - †Lampropeltis triangulum
- Lasiopodomys
  - †Lasiopodomys deceitensis
- Lenticulina
  - †Lenticulina rotulata
- Lepisosteus
- †Leptomactra
  - †Leptomactra delumbis
  - †Leptomactra marylandica
- †Leptophoca – type locality for genus
  - †Leptophoca lenis – type locality for species
  - †Leptophoca proxima – or unidentified comparable form
- Lepus
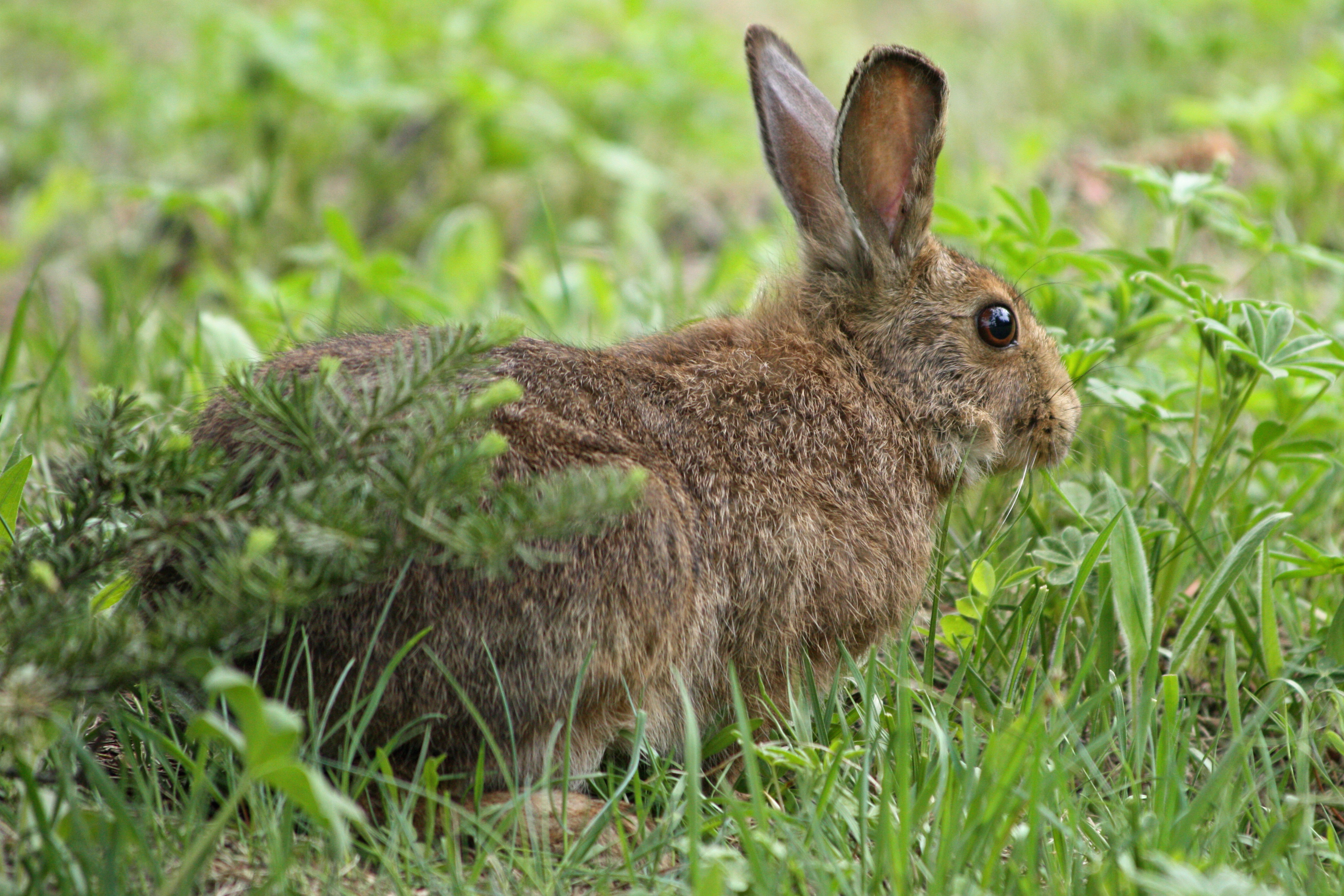
  - A living Lepus americanus, or snowshoe hare
    †Lepus americanus
- †Levifusus
  - †Levifusus trabeatus
- Libinia
  - †Libinia dubia
- †Lingulodinium
  - †Lingulodinium macherophorum
- Lirophora
  - †Lirophora alevata
  - †Lirophora alveata
  - †Lirophora latilirata
  - †Lirophora parkeria
- Lithophaga – or unidentified comparable form
  - †Lithophaga marylandica
- Littoraria
  - †Littoraria irrorata
- Lontra
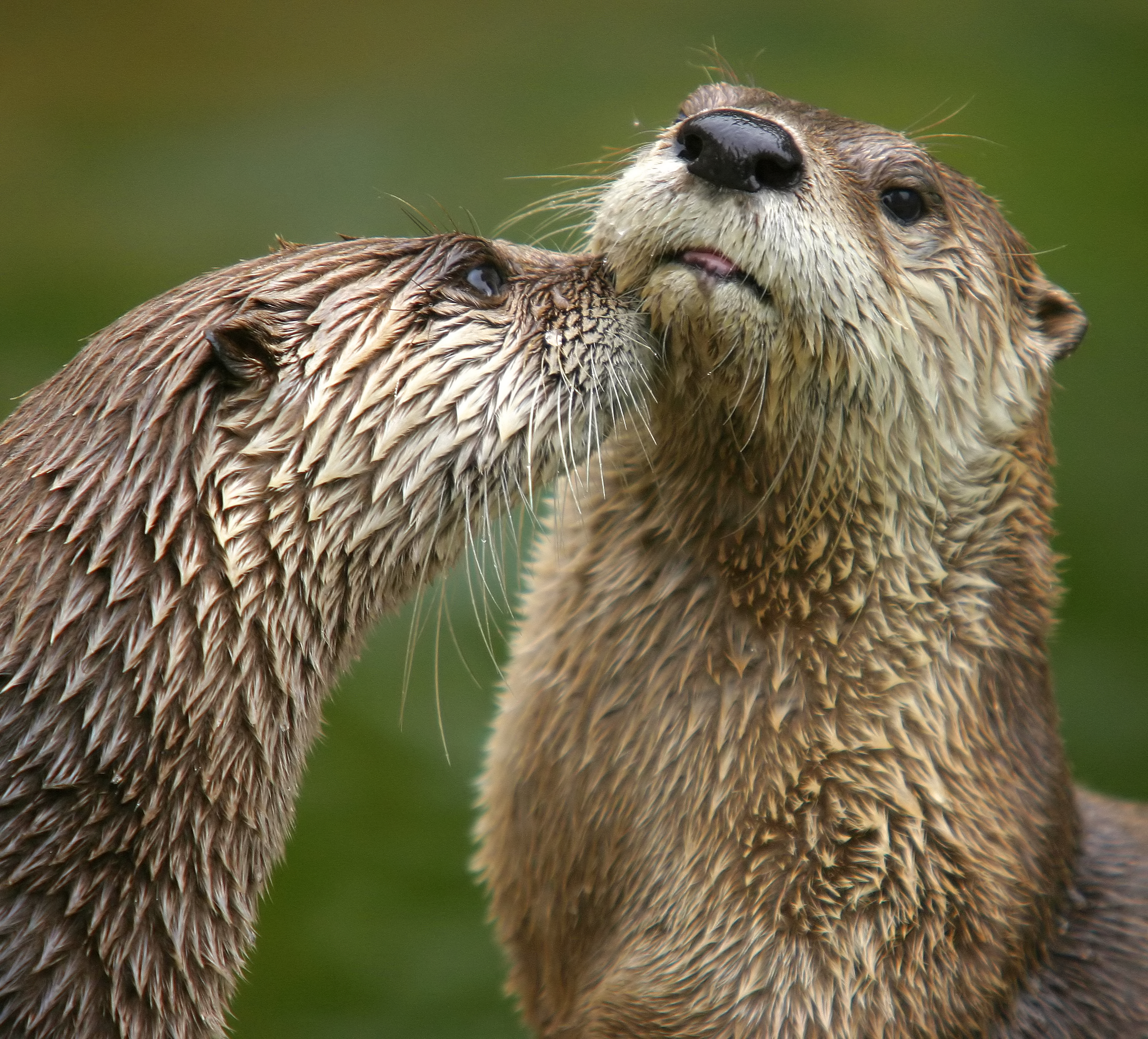
  - Pair of living Lontra canadensis, or North American river otter
    †Lontra canadensis
- †Lophocetus
  - †Lophocetus calvertensis – type locality for species
  - †Lophocetus pappus – type locality for species
- †Lophochelys – tentative report
- Lopholatilus
- Loxoconcha
  - †Loxoconcha impressa
- Lucina – report made of unidentified related form or using admittedly obsolete nomenclature
- Lucina
  - †Lucina dartoni
  - †Lucina whitei
- Lucinoma
  - †Lucinoma contracta
  - †Lucinoma filosa
- Lunatia
  - †Lunatia catenoides
- Lyonsia
  - †Lyonsia hyalina

== M ==
- Macoma
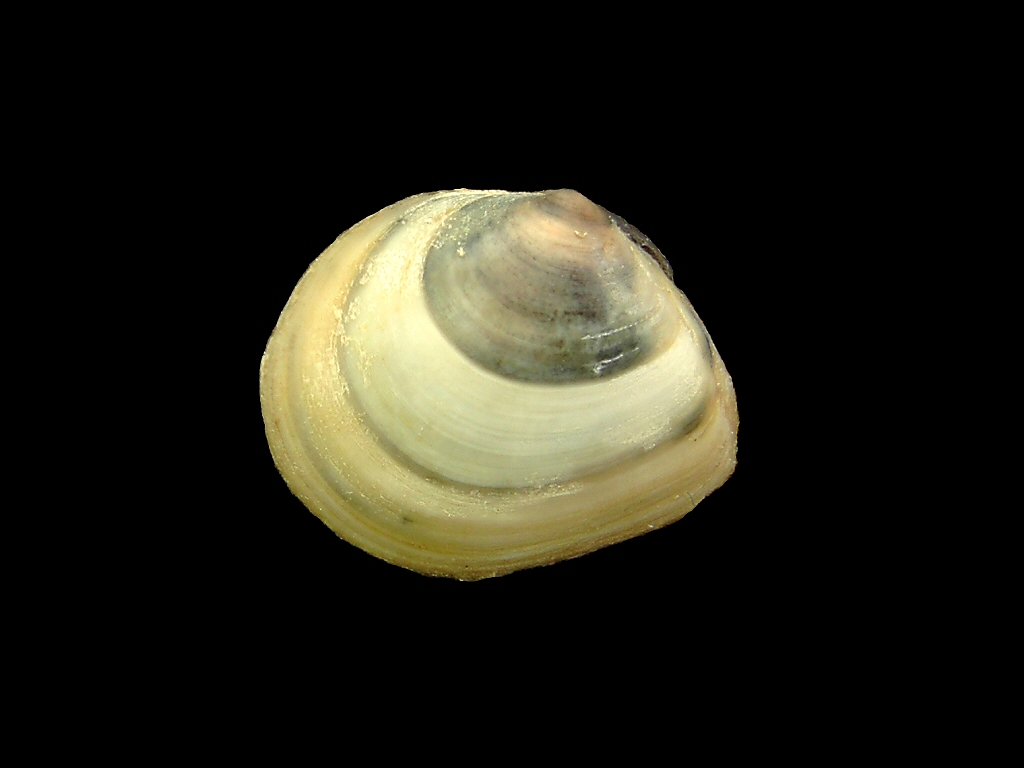
  - Shell of a Limecola balthica, or Baltic clam
    †Macoma balthica
  - †Macoma calcarea
- Macrocallista
  - †Macrocallista marylandica
  - †Macrocallista subimpressa
- †Macrokentriodon – type locality for genus
  - †Macrokentriodon morani – type locality for species
- Mactrodesma
  - †Mactrodesma subponderosa
  - †Mactrodesma subponderosum
- †Mammut
  - †Mammut americanum
- †Mammuthus
  - †Mammuthus columbi
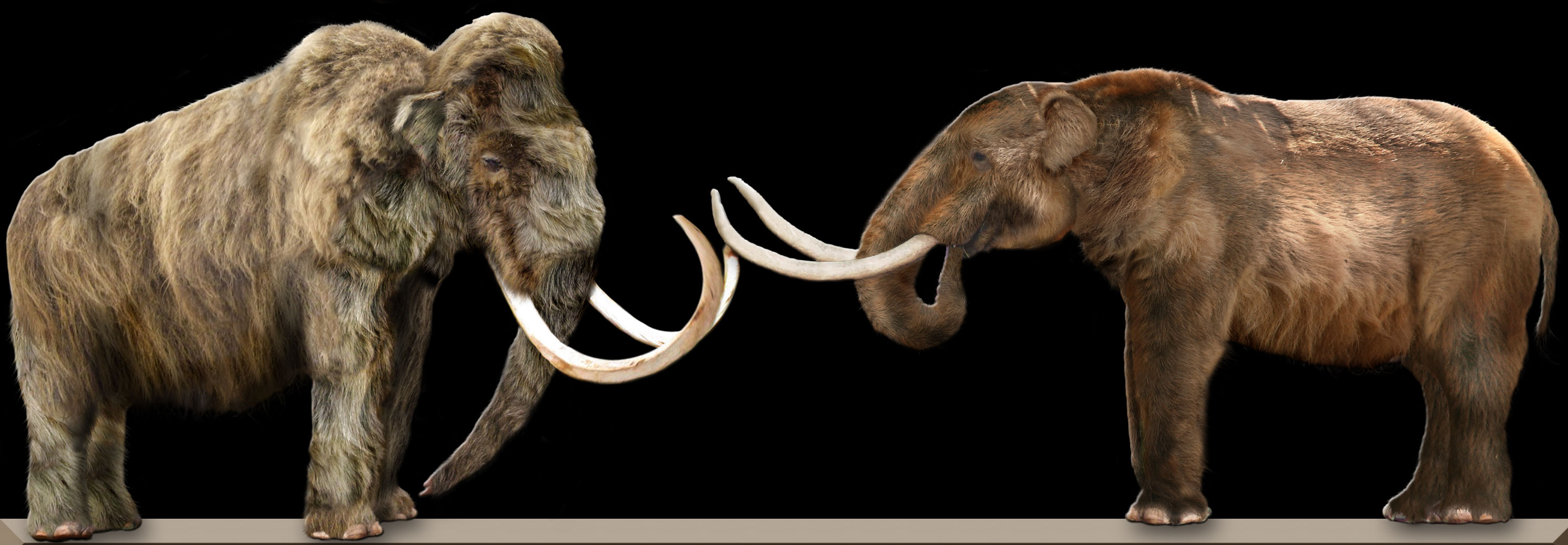
  - Life restorations of a Mammut americanum, or American mastodon (right), and a Mammuthus primigenius, or wooly mammoth (left)
    †Mammuthus primigenius
- Marginella
  - †Marginella minuta
- †Mariacolpus – type locality for genus
  - †Mariacolpus plebeia
- †Mariadrillia – type locality for genus
  - †Mariadrillia parvoidea
- †Mariafusus – type locality for genus
  - †Mariafusus marylandica
- †Marianarona – type locality for genus
  - †Marianarona asheri – type locality for species
  - †Marianarona marylandica – type locality for species
- †Mariasalpinx – type locality for genus
  - †Mariasalpinx emilyae – type locality for species
- †Mariasveltia – type locality for genus
  - †Mariasveltia lunata
- †Mariaturricula – type locality for genus
  - †Mariaturricula biscatenaria
- Marmota
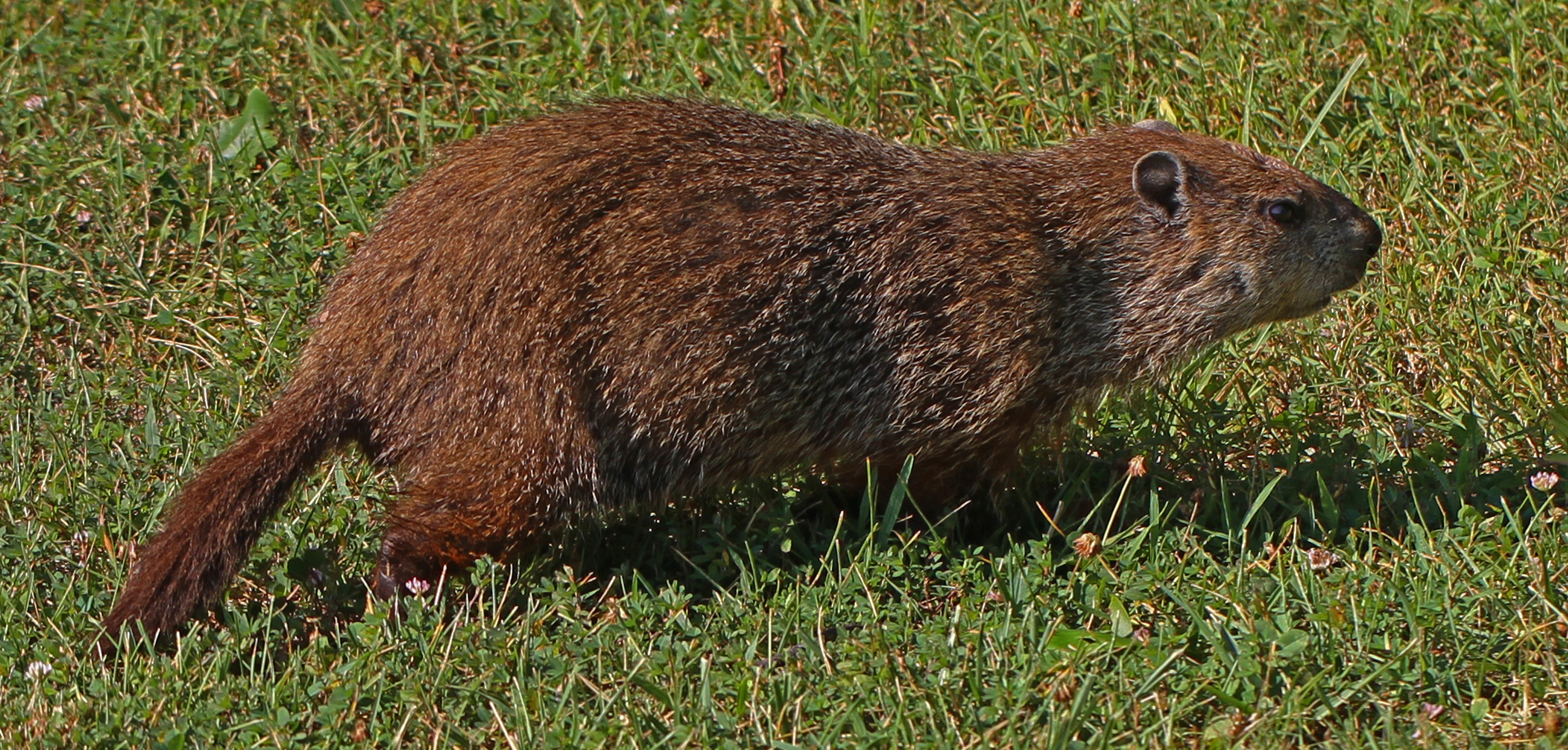
  - A living Marmota monax, or groundhog
    †Marmota monax
- Martesia
  - †Martesia cuneiformis
  - †Martesia ovalis
- †Marvacrassatella
  - †Marvacrassatella marylandica
  - †Marvacrassatella melina
  - †Marvacrassatella turgidula
- Massilina
  - †Massilina marylandica
- Mathilda
  - †Mathilda crebricosta – type locality for species
  - †Mathilda form A informal
  - †Mathilda form B informal
  - †Mathilda form C informal
  - †Mathilda kauffmani – type locality for species
  - †Mathilda marylandensis – type locality for species
- †Medoriopsis
  - †Medoriopsis marylandica
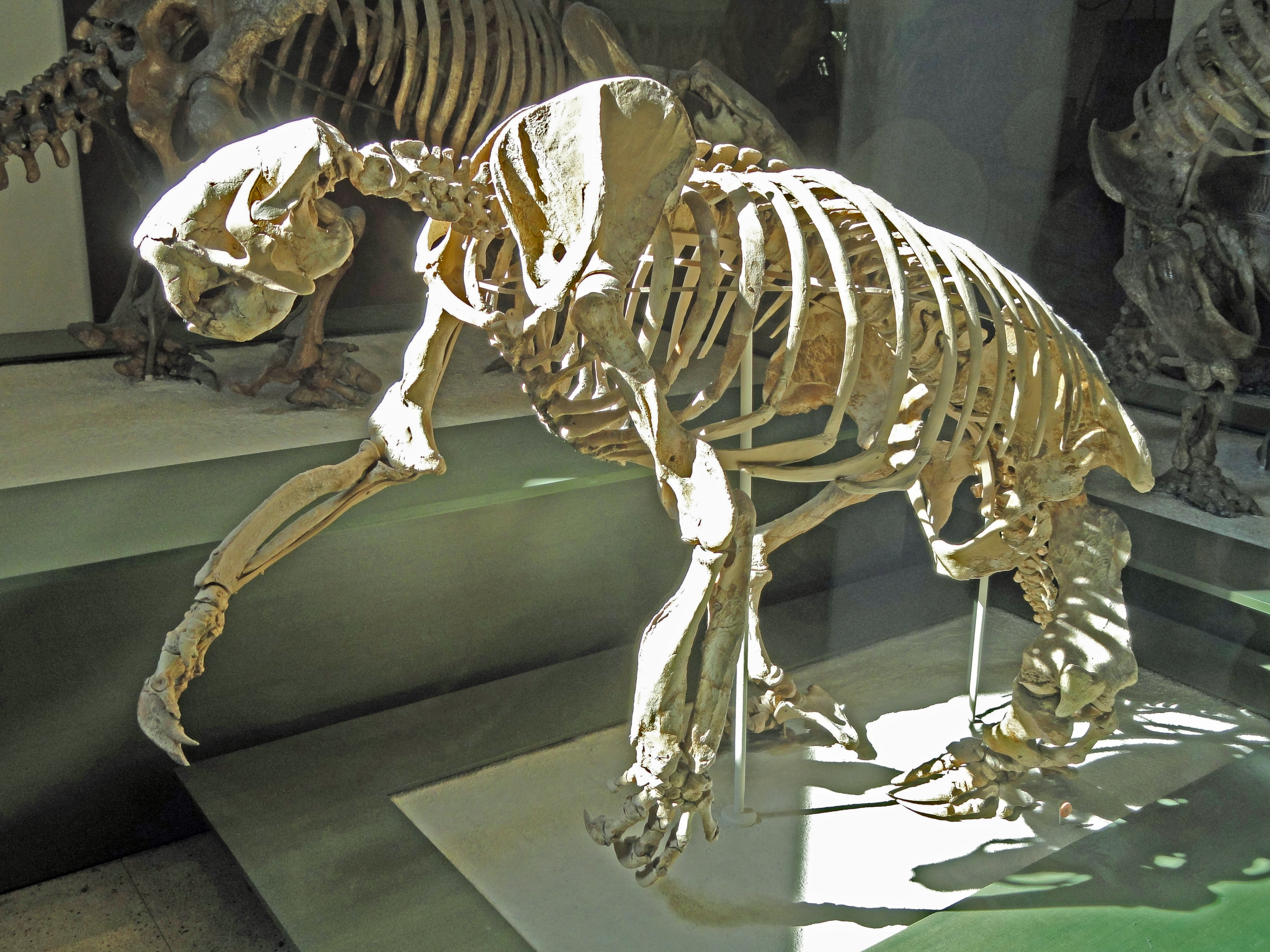
- Mounted fossilized skeleton of the Miocene-Pleistocene ground sloth Megalonyx
  †Megalonyx
- Megaptera
  - †Megaptera expansa – type locality for species
- Melampus
  - †Melampus bidentatus
- Melanitta
  - †Melanitta deglandi
- Meleagris
  - †Meleagris gallopavo
- †Melosia
  - †Melosia staminea
- Membranipora
  - †Membranipora flabellata
- Menestho
  - †Menestho form A informal
- Mephitis
  - †Mephitis mephitis
- Mercenaria
  - †Mercenaria blakei
  - †Mercenaria campechiensis
  - †Mercenaria cuneata – type locality for species
  - †Mercenaria ducatelli – tentative report
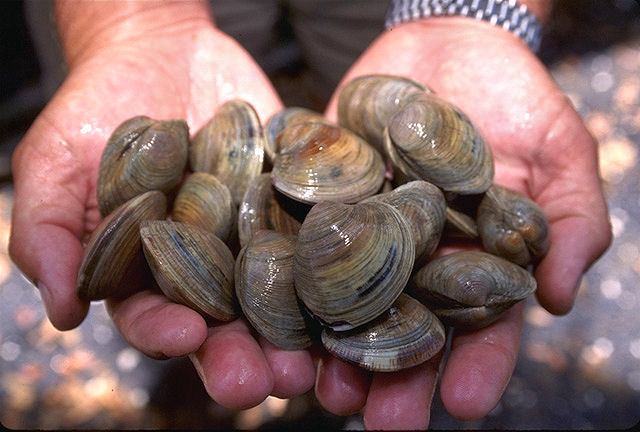
  - Collection of Mercenaria mercenaria, also known as hard clams or quahogs
    †Mercenaria mercenaria
  - †Mercenaria plena
  - †Mercenaria staminea
  - †Mercenaria subcuneata
  - †Mercenaria tetrica
- Meretrix
  - †Meretrix subimpressa
- †Merychippus
- †Mesocetus
  - †Mesocetus siphunculus
- †Mesorhytis – tentative report
  - †Mesorhytis pomonkensis
  - †Mesorhytis potomacensis
- †Messapicetus
  - †Messapicetus longirostris
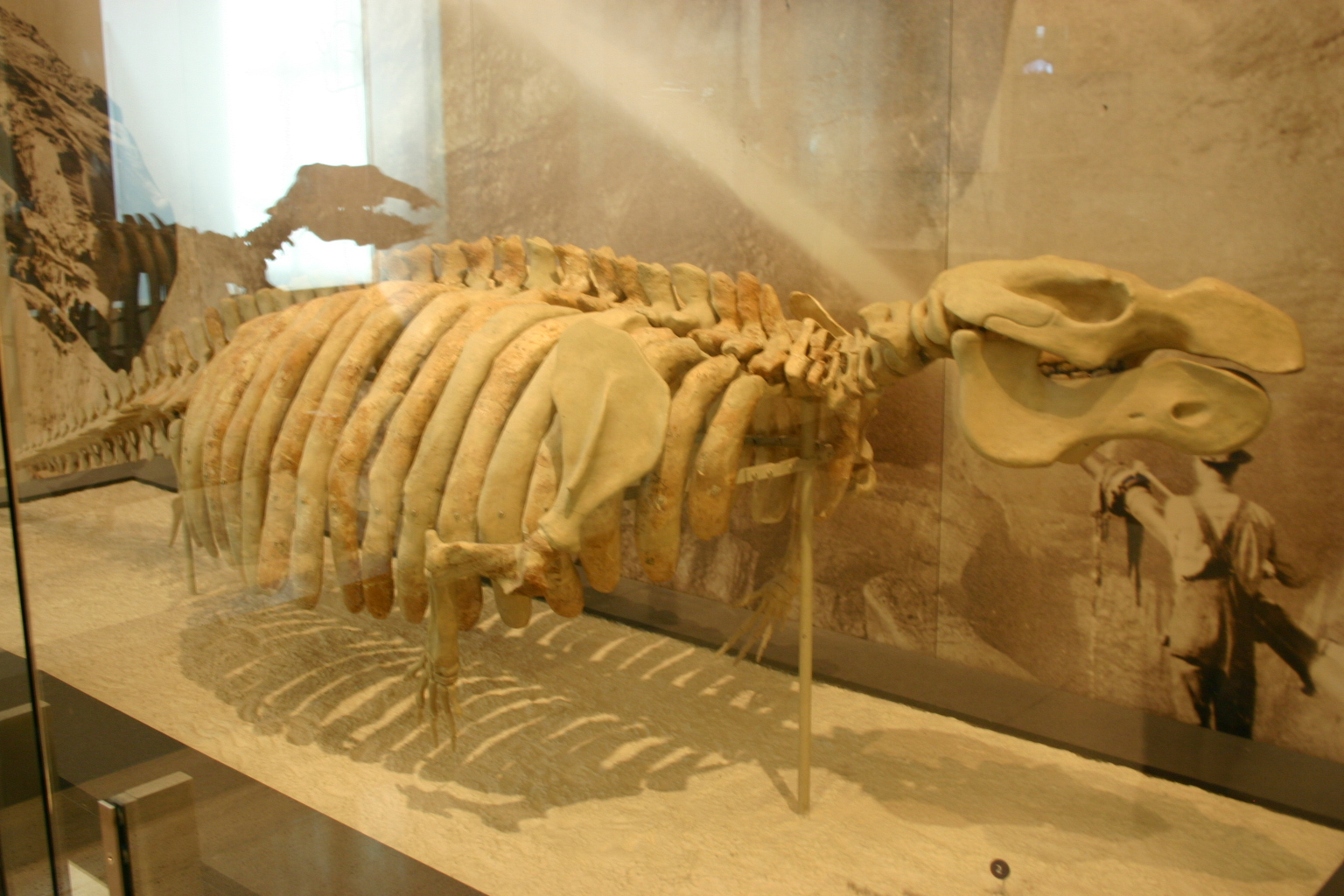
- Mounted fossilized skeleton of the Miocene-Pleistocene manatee relative Metaxytherium
  †Metaxytherium
  - †Metaxytherium crataegense – type locality for species
- †Micropogon
  - †Micropogon undulatus
- Microtus
  - †Microtus chrotorrhinus – or unidentified comparable form
  - †Microtus guildayi
  - †Microtus involutus – or unidentified comparable form
  - †Microtus pennsylvanicus
- Mictomys
  - †Mictomys borealis
- Miltha
  - †Miltha aquiana
- †Miocepphus
  - †Miocepphus bohaskai – type locality for species
  - †Miocepphus mcclungi
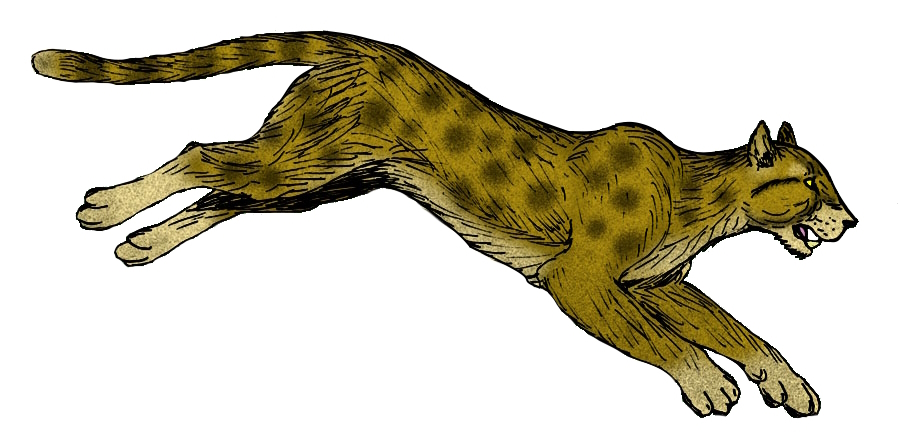
- Restoration of the Pliocene-Pleistocene Miracinonyx, or American cheetah
  †Miracinonyx
  - †Miracinonyx inexpectatus
- Mitra
  - †Mitra marylandica
- Modiolus
  - †Modiolus dalli
  - †Modiolus ducatelli
  - †Modiolus ducatellii
  - †Modiolus modiolus
  - †Modiolus potomacensis – type locality for species
- †Moira – tentative report
  - †Moira atropos
- †Monotherium
  - †Monotherium affine
- Morus
  - †Morus avitus – type locality for species
- Mulinia
  - †Mulinia lateralis
- Mustela
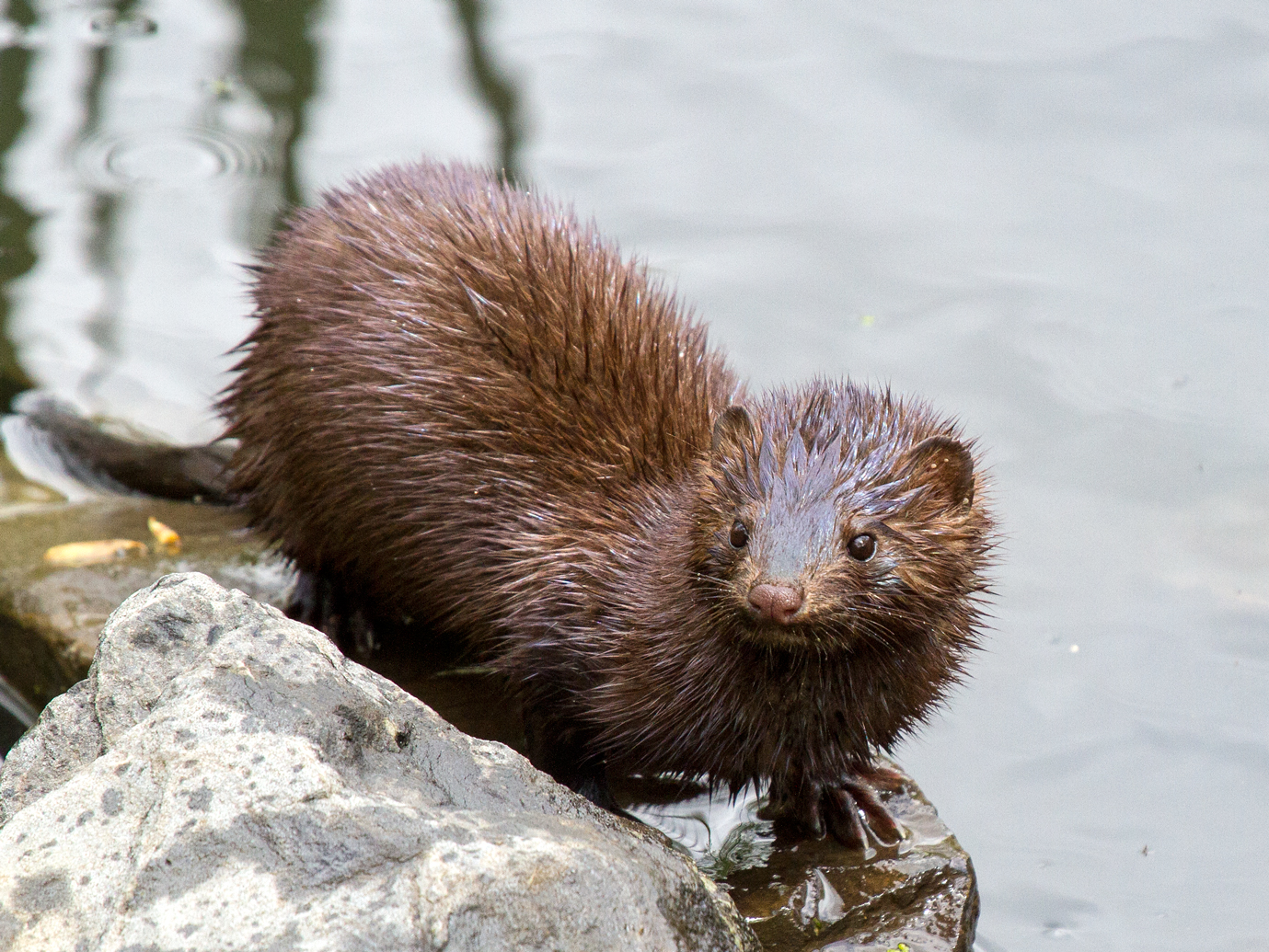
  - A living Neovison vison, or American mink
    †Mustela vison – or unidentified comparable form
- †Mya
  - †Mya arenaria
- Myliobatis
  - †Myliobatis dixoni – type locality for species
  - †Myliobatis frangens – type locality for species
  - †Myliobatis fremenvillii – or unidentified comparable form
  - †Myliobatis gigas
  - †Myliobatis pachyodon
  - †Myliobatis vicomicanus
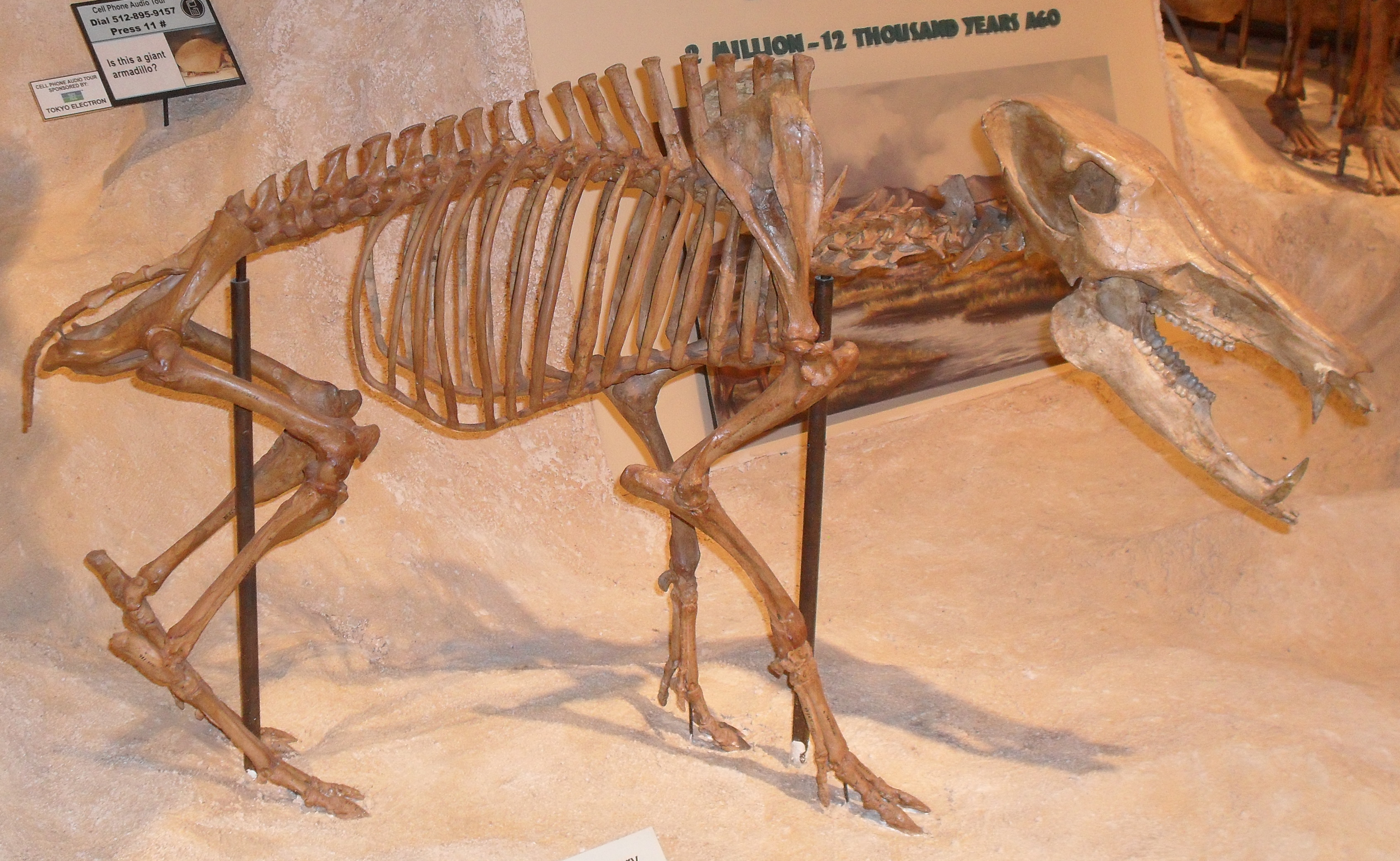
- Fossilized skeleton of the Pliocene-Holocene peccary Mylohyus
  †Mylohyus
  - †Mylohyus fossilis – type locality for species
  - †Mylohyus obtusidens
- Myotis
  - †Myotis grisescens – or unidentified comparable form
- Myrtea – tentative report
  - †Myrtea astartiformis
  - †Myrtea uhleri
- Mysella
  - †Mysella planulata
- Mytilus
  - †Mytilus incurvus

== N ==
- †Nanosiren – tentative report
- Napaeozapus
  - †Napaeozapus insignis
- Narona
  - †Narona potomacensis
- Nassa
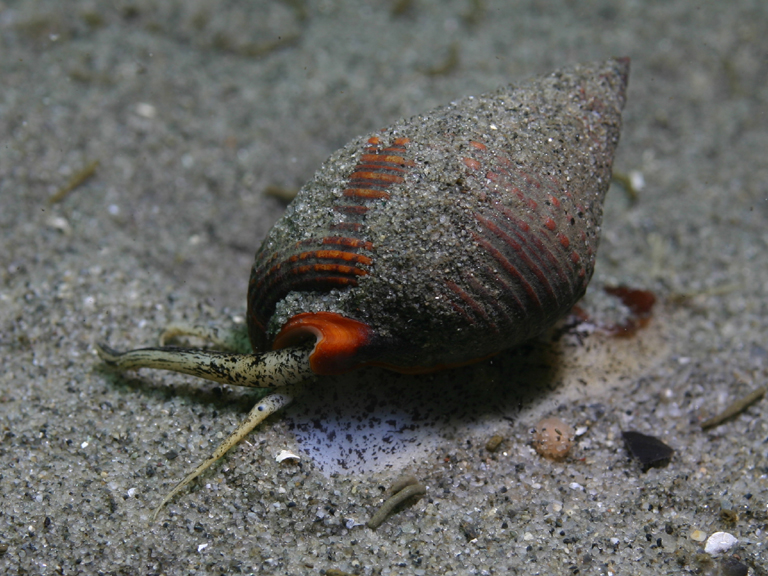
- A living Nassarius, or nassa mud snail
  Nassarius
  - †Nassarius peralta
  - †Nassarius vibex
- Nemocardium
  - †Nemocardium lene
- Neofiber
- Neotoma – type locality for genus
  - †Neotoma floridana
  - †Neotoma spelaea – type locality for species
- Nerodia
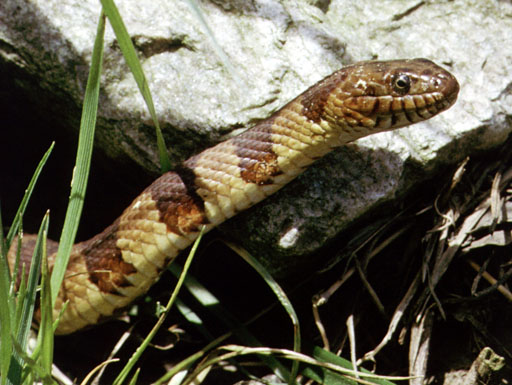
  - A living Nerodia sipedon, or northern water snake
    †Nerodia sipedon
- Neverita
  - †Neverita asheri – type locality for species
  - †Neverita cliftonensis
  - †Neverita discula – type locality for species
  - †Neverita duplicatus
  - †Neverita potomacensis – type locality for species
- †Nodisurculina – type locality for genus
  - †Nodisurculina engonata
- Noetia
  - †Noetia carolinensis
- Nonion
  - †Nonion calvertensis
  - †Nonion pompilioides
  - †Nonion sloanii
- Notidanus
  - †Notidanus primigeneus
  - †Notidanus primigenius
- Notophthalmus
  - †Notophthalmus viridescens – or unidentified comparable form
- Notorynchus
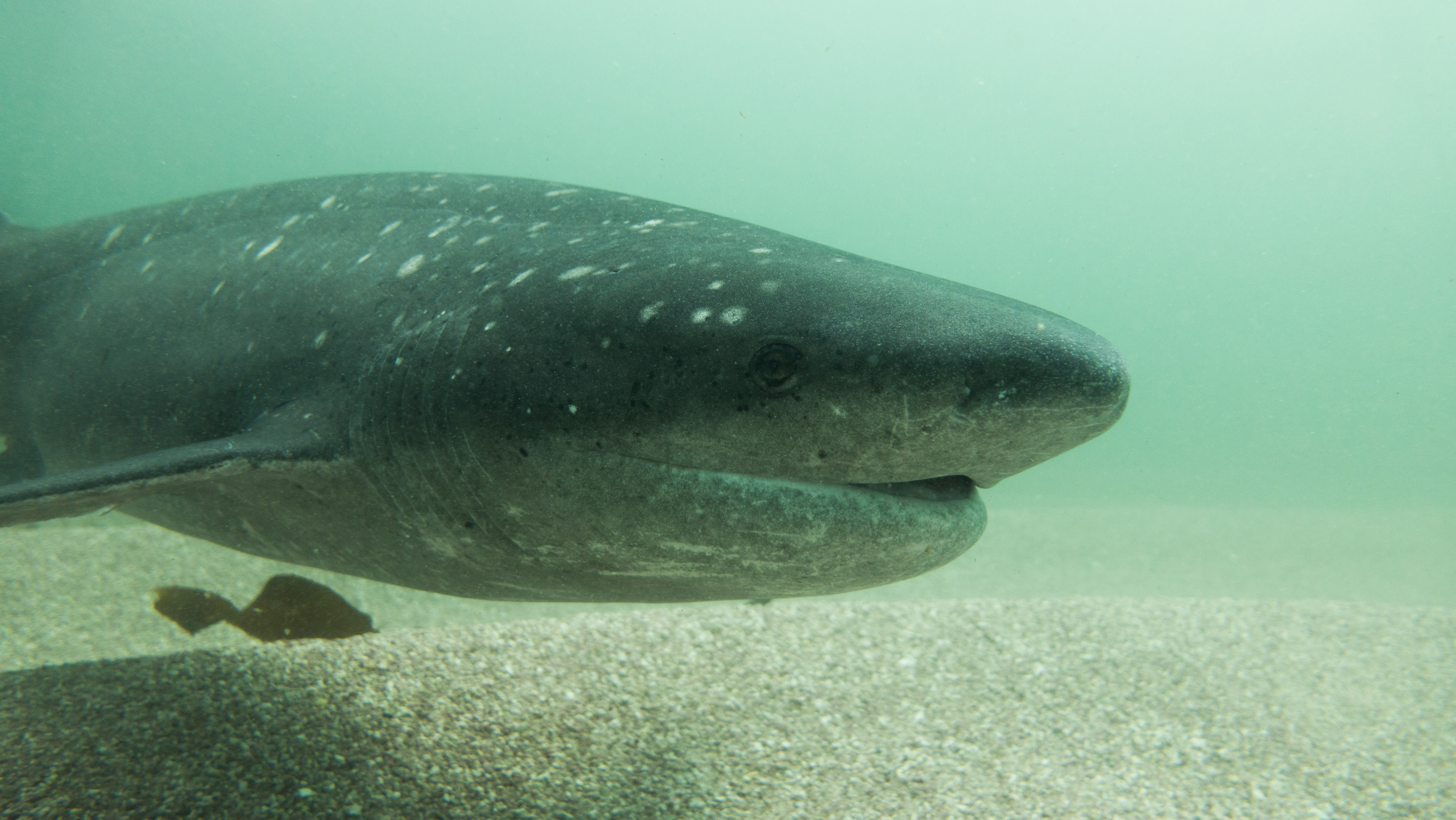
  - Close-up portrait of a living Notorynchus cepedianus, or broadnose sevengill shark
    †Notorynchus cepedianus – type locality for species
- Novocrania
  - †Novocrania lububris
- Nucula
  - †Nucula potomacensis
  - †Nucula proxima
  - †Nucula prunicola
  - †Nucula taphria
- Nuculana
  - †Nuculana acuta
  - †Nuculana cliftonensis
  - †Nuculana cultelliformis
  - †Nuculana improcera
  - †Nuculana liciata
  - †Nuculana luciata
  - †Nuculana parilis
  - †Nuculana tysoni

== O ==
- Ochotona
  - †Ochotona princeps – or unidentified comparable form
- Odocoileus
  - †Odocoileus virginianus
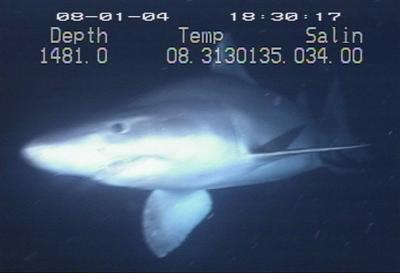
- A living Odontaspis sand shark
  Odontaspis
  - †Odontaspis actutissima
  - †Odontaspis acutissima
  - †Odontaspis hopei
  - †Odontaspis littoralis
  - †Odontaspis macrota
  - †Odontaspis verticalis
  - †Odontaspis winkleri
- †Odontopolys
- Odostomia
  - †Odostomia insignifica
- †Ogivalina
  - †Ogivalina parvula
- Ondatra
  - †Ondatra annectens
  - †Ondatra zibethicus
- †Operculodinium
  - †Operculodinium centrocarpum
  - †Operculodinium piaseckii
- Opheodrys
  - †Opheodrys vernalis
- Ophiura
  - †Ophiura marylandica
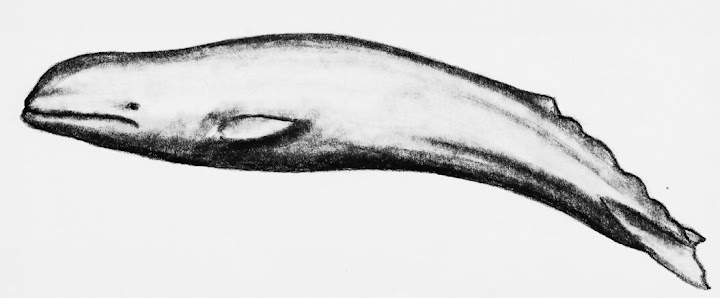
- Life restoration of the Miocene sperm whale Orycterocetus
  †Orycterocetus
  - †Orycterocetus crocodilinus
- †Osteopygis
  - †Osteopygis roundsi
- Ostrea
  - †Ostrea alepidota
  - †Ostrea carolinensis
  - †Ostrea trachydiscus – type locality for species
- †Otodus
  - †Otodus angustidens – tentative report
  - Diagram illustrating the largest (grey) and most conservative (red) size estimates of the Miocene-Pliocene shark Carcharocles megalodon (sometimes Carcharodon or Otodus megalodon) with a whale shark (violet), great white shark (green), and anachronistic human (black) to scale
    †Otodus megalodon
- Otus
  - †Otus guildayi – type locality for species
- †Oxyrhina
  - †Oxyrhina cuspidata
  - †Oxyrhina desorii
  - †Oxyrhina elegans
  - †Oxyrhina retroflexa
  - †Oxyrhina sillimani

== P ==
- Pagurus
  - †Pagurus pollicaris
- †Palaeocarcharodon
  - †Palaeocarcharodon orientalis
- †Palaeocystodinium
  - †Palaeocystodinium golzowense
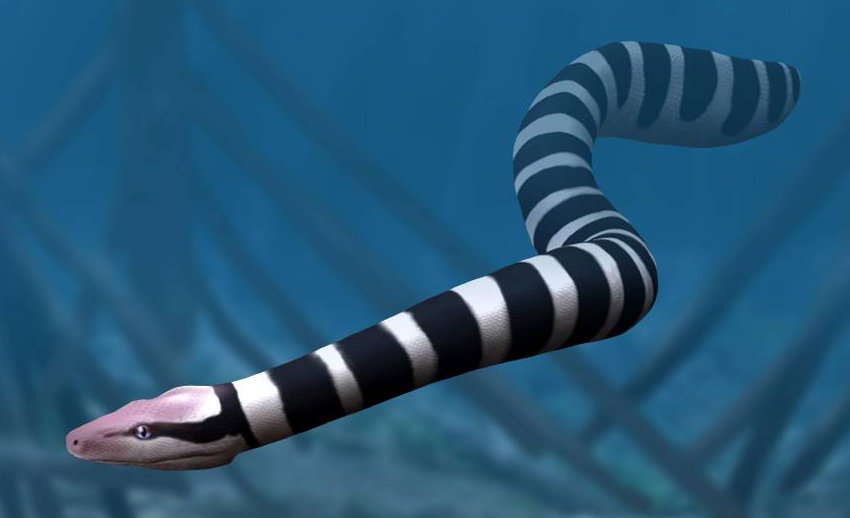
- Restoration of the Cretaceous-Eocene sea snake Palaeophis
  †Palaeophis
  - †Palaeophis grandis
- †Pamicellaria
  - †Pamicellaria convoluta
- Pandora
  - †Pandora gouldiana
- Panopea
  - †Panopea americana
  - †Panopea elongata
  - †Panopea goldfussi
  - †Panopea goldfussii
  - †Panopea whitfieldi
- Panopeus
  - †Panopeus herbstii
- Panthera
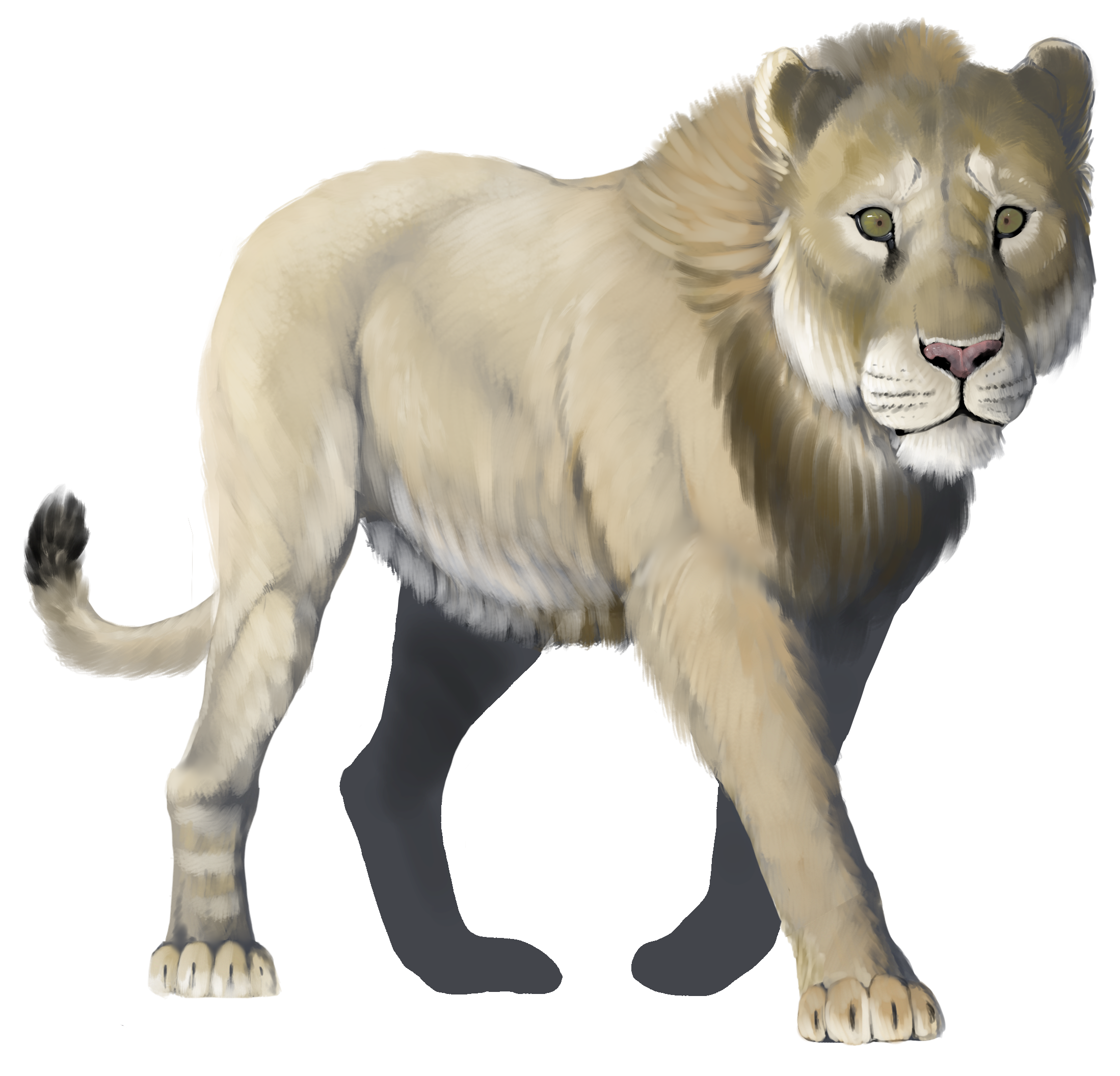
  - American lion National Park Service illustration
    †Panthera atrox
  - †Panthera onca
- Paraconcavus
  - †Paraconcavus rooseveltensis
- †Paramya
  - †Paramya subovata
- Parascalops
  - †Parascalops breweri
- †Parietobalaena – type locality for genus
  - †Parietobalaena palmeri – type locality for species
- Parvilucina
  - †Parvilucina crenulata
  - †Parvilucina multistriata
- †Pasitheola
  - †Pasitheola marylandensis – type locality for species
- Pecten
  - †Pecten humphreysii
  - †Pecten marylandica
- Pekania
  - †Pekania diluviana – type locality for species
- †Pelocetus – type locality for genus
  - †Pelocetus calvertensis – type locality for species
- †Pelodelphis – type locality for genus
  - †Pelodelphis gracilis – type locality for species
- †Pentadinium
  - †Pentadinium latincinctum – or unidentified comparable form
- Periploma – tentative report
- Perisoreus
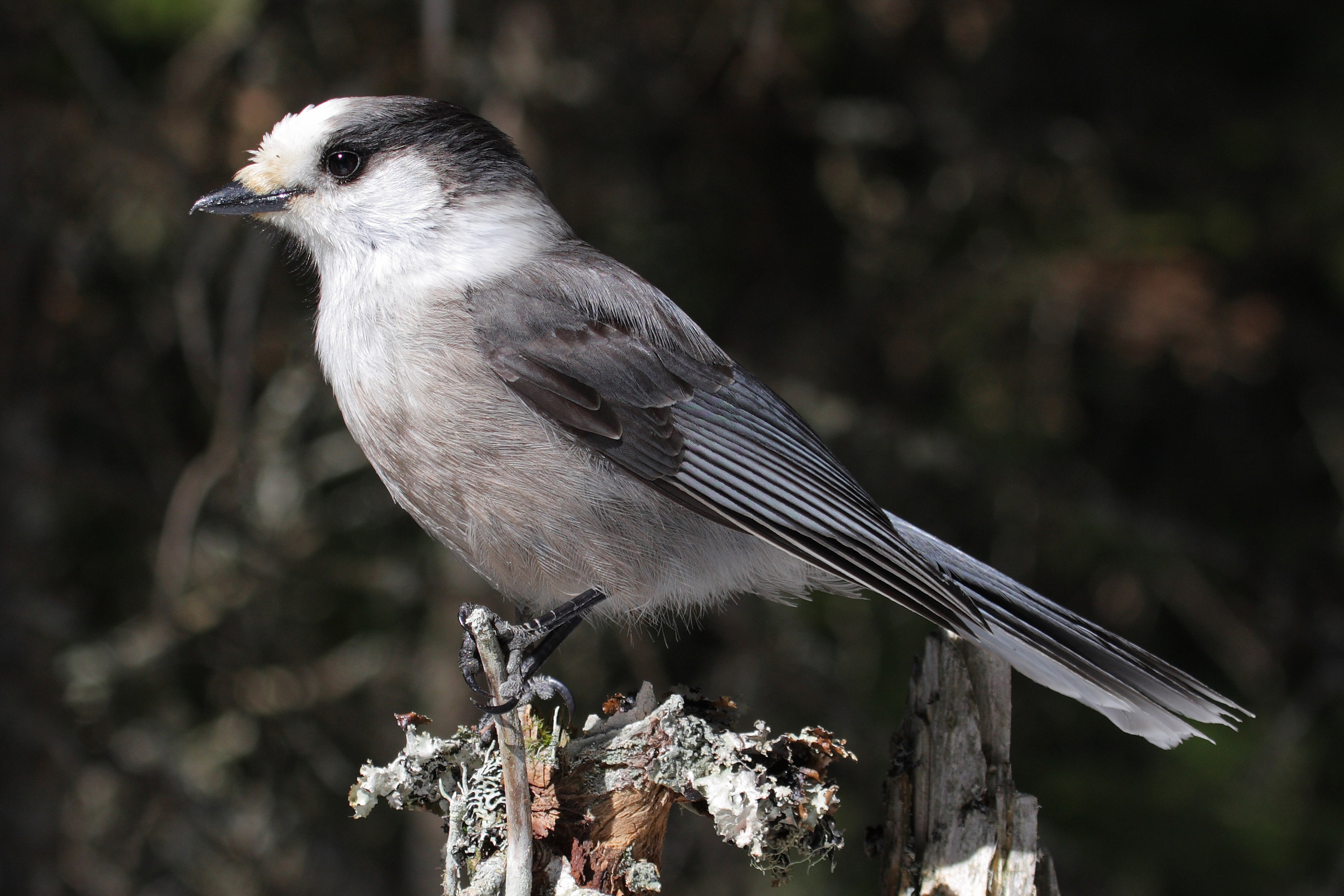
  - A living Perisoreus canadensis, or grey jay
    †Perisoreus canadensis
- Peromyscus
  - †Peromyscus cumberlandensis
  - †Peromyscus leucopus – or unidentified comparable form
- †Petauristodon
  - †Petauristodon alpinus – or unidentified comparable form
- Petricola
  - †Petricola calvertensis
  - †Petricola pholadiformis
- Phacoides
  - †Phacoides anodonata
  - †Phacoides contractus
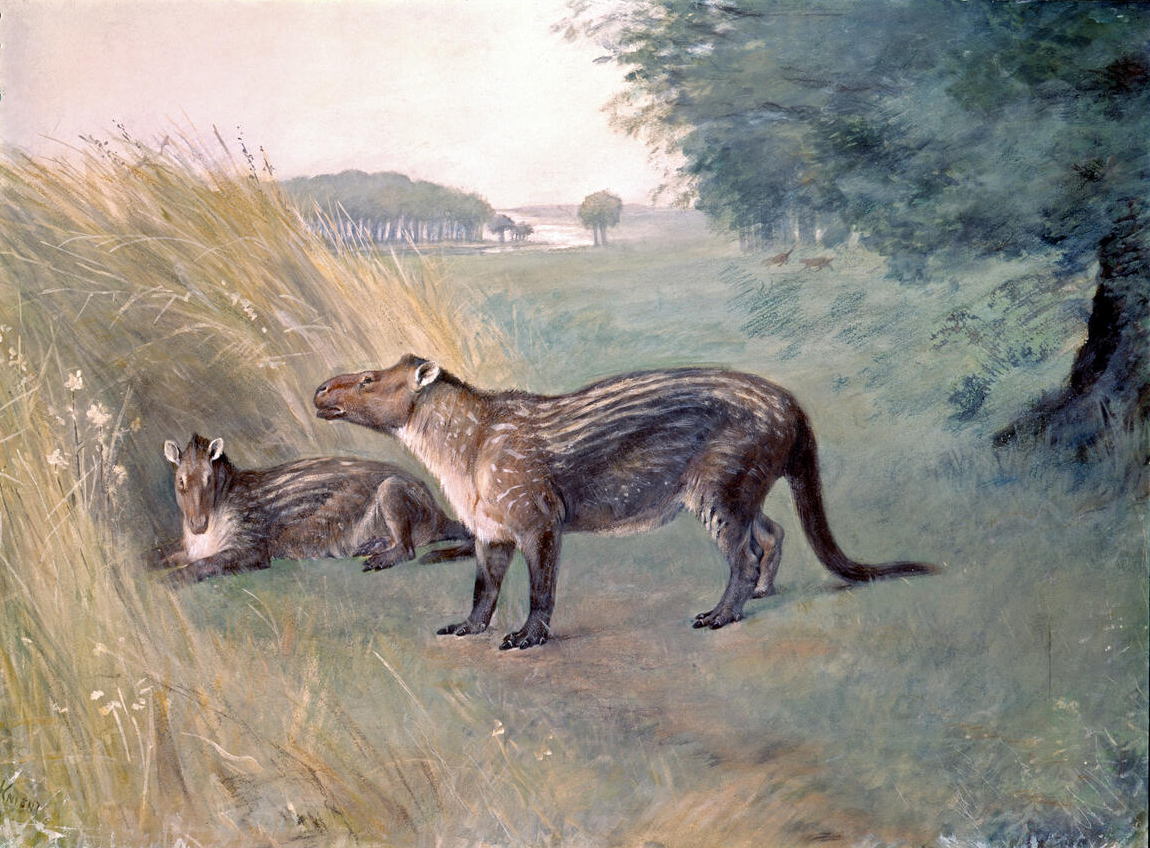
- Life restoration of the Paleocene-Eocene ungulate Phenacodus. Charles R. Knight (1898).
  †Phenacodus – tentative report
- †Phenacomya
  - †Phenacomya petrosa
- Phenacomys
- †Phocageneus
  - †Phocageneus venustus
- Pholadomya
  - †Pholadomya marylandica
- †Physeterula
- Physodon
  - †Physodon triqueter
- Pinna
- Pipistrellus
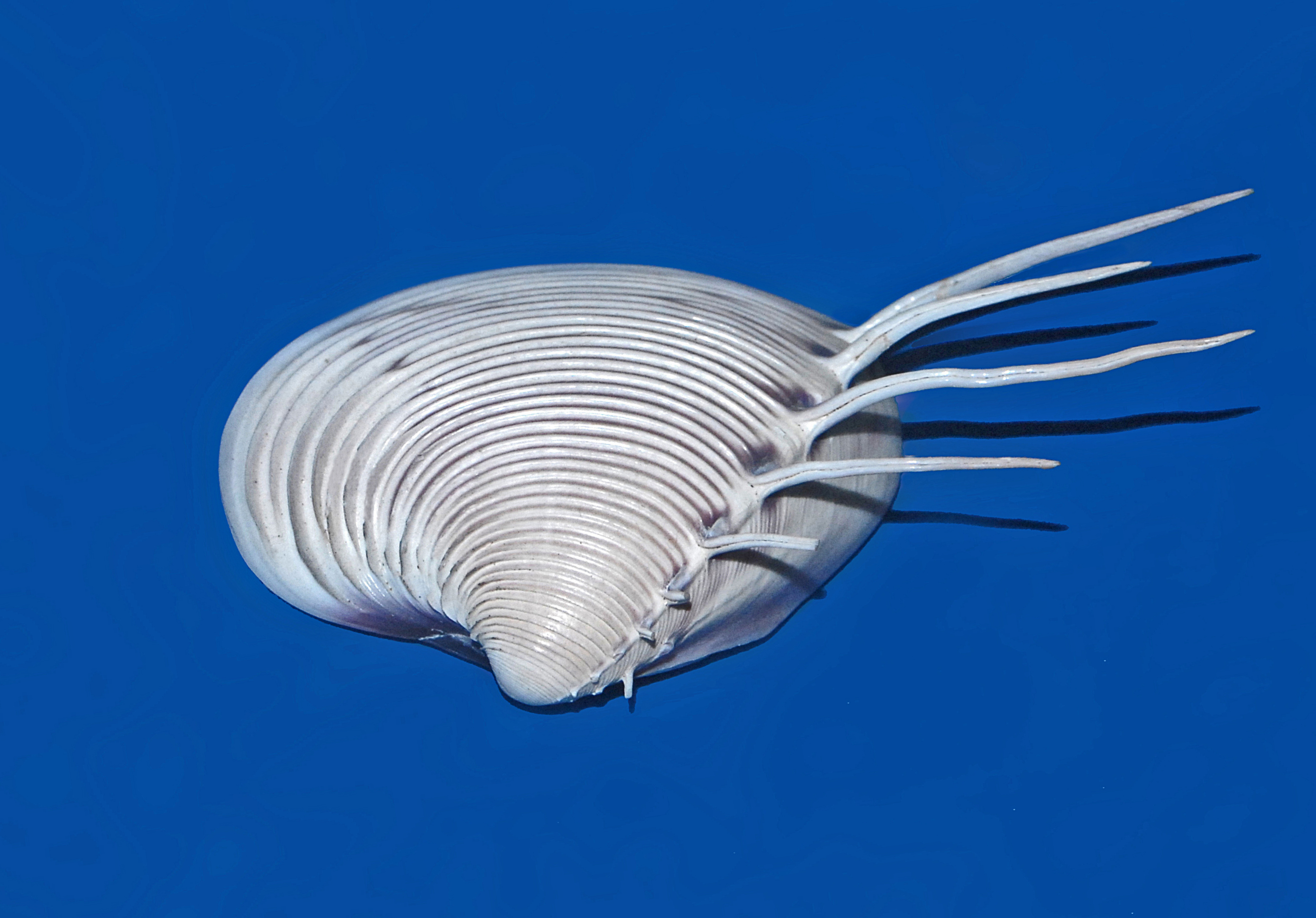
- Shell of a Pitar venus clam
  Pitar
  - †Pitar morrhuanus
  - †Pitar ovatus
  - †Pitar pyga
  - †Pitar subnasuta
- Pitymys
  - †Pitymys cumberlandensis
- Placopecten
  - †Placopecten clintonius
  - †Placopecten marylandica
  - †Placopecten virginiana
- Platidia
  - †Platidia marylandica – type locality for species
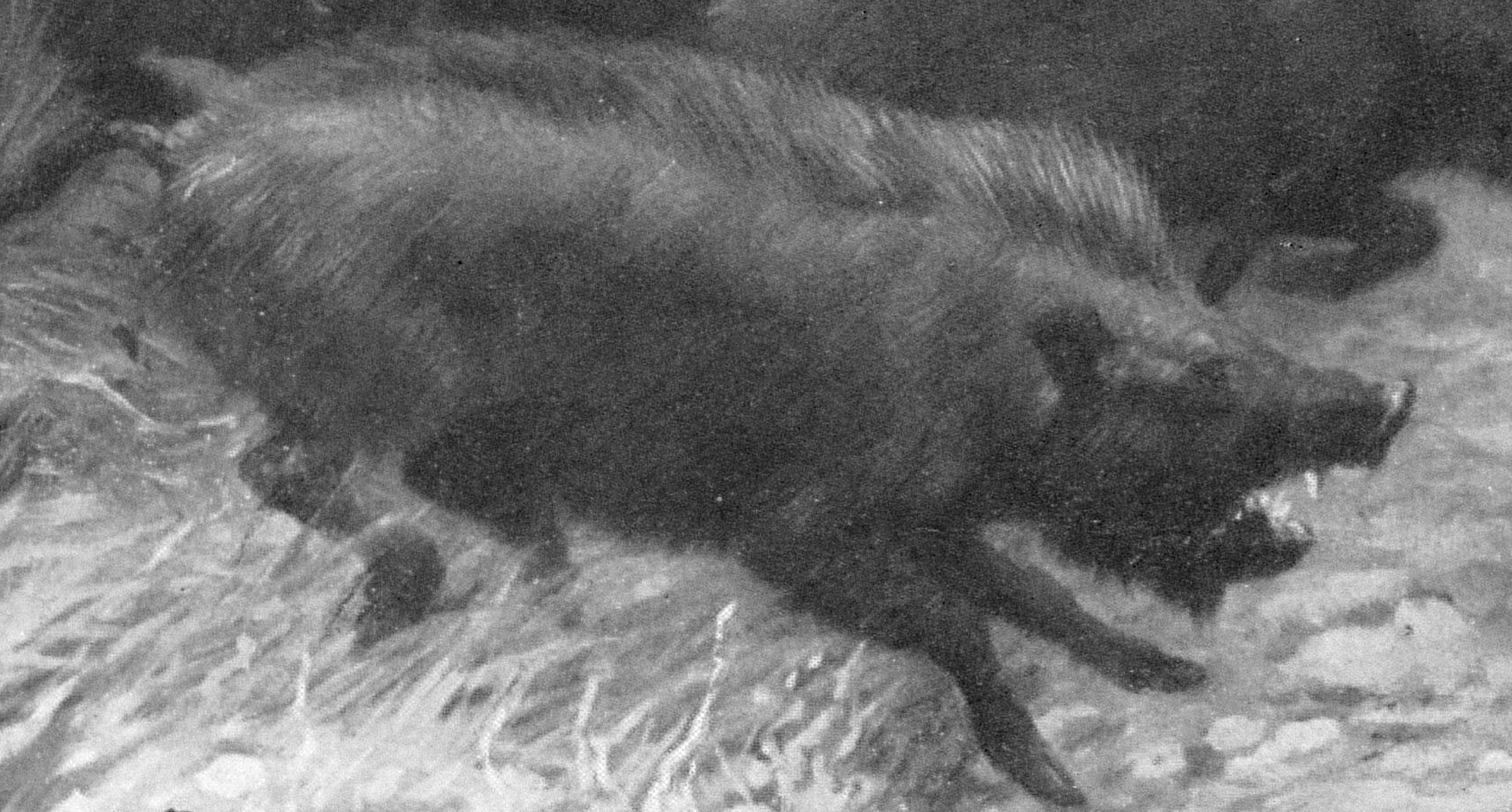
- Restoration of a herd of alarmed Miocene-Pleistocene peccaries of the genus Platygonus. Charles R. Knight (1922).
  †Platygonus
  - †Platygonus cumberlandensis
  - †Platygonus intermedius – type locality for species
  - †Platygonus tetragonus
  - †Platygonus vetus
- Plecotus
  - †Plecotus alleganiensis – type locality for species
- Plethodon
  - †Plethodon gultinosus
- Pleurotomella
  - †Pleurotomella bellistriata – type locality for species
- †Pliorhytis
  - †Pliorhytis centenaria
- Pogonias
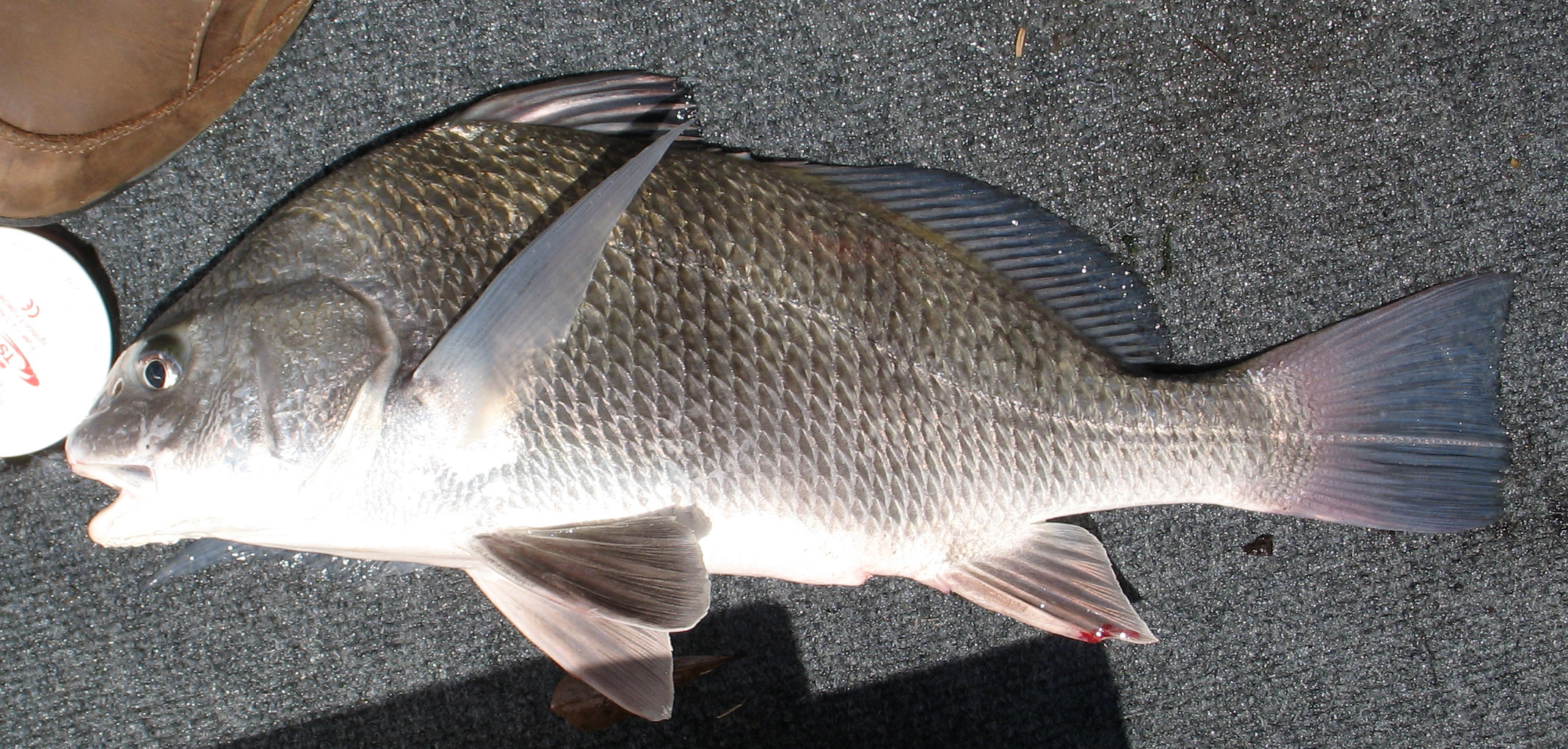
  - A living Pogonias cromis, or black drum
    †Pogonias cromis – or unidentified comparable form
- †Poliniciella – type locality for genus
  - †Poliniciella marylandica – type locality for species
- Polydora
- Polystira
  - †Polystira barretti
  - †Polystira communis
- Poromya
  - †Poromya subovata
- †Praeorbulina
  - †Praeorbulina glomerosa
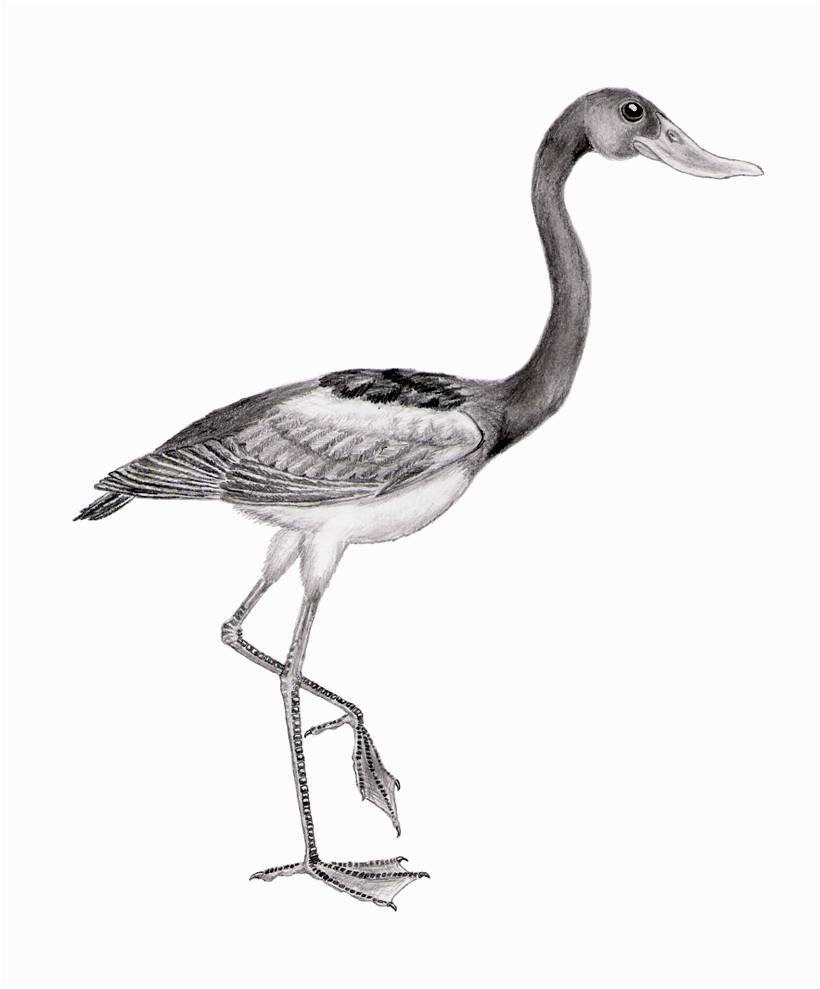
- Life restoration of the Paleocene-Eocene waterfowl Presbyornis
  †Presbyornis
  - †Presbyornis isoni – type locality for species
- †Prionodon
  - †Prionodon egertoni
- Prionotus
  - †Prionotus evolans – or unidentified related form
- †Priscodelphinus
  - †Priscodelphinus acutidens – type locality for species
  - †Priscodelphinus atropius – type locality for species
  - †Priscodelphinus conradi
  - †Priscodelphinus stenus – type locality for species
  - †Priscodelphinus uraeus
- †Priscoficus
  - †Priscoficus arguta
- Propebela
  - †Propebela marylandica – type locality for species
  - †Propebela parva
- Prophaethon – tentative report
- †Prosthennops
  - †Prosthennops niobrarensis
  - †Prosthennops xiphodonticus
- †Protocardia
  - †Protocardia virginiana
- Pseudacris
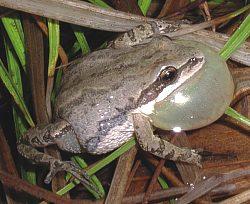
  - A living Pseudacris triseriata, or western chorus frog
    †Pseudacris triseriata
- †Pseudoaptyxis
  - †Pseudoaptyxis sanctaemariae – type locality for species
- †Pseudocepphus – type locality for genus
  - †Pseudocepphus teres – type locality for species
- Pseudoliva
  - †Pseudoliva longicostata – type locality for species
  - †Pseudoliva tuberculifera
- Pseudomalaxis – or unidentified comparable form
  - †Pseudomalaxis ripleyana
- †Pseudophorus
  - †Pseudophorus calvertensis – type locality for species
- †Pseudotrition
  - †Pseudotrition ruber
- Pteria
- †Ptychosalpinx
  - †Ptychosalpinx altilis
  - †Ptychosalpinx multirugata
  - †Ptychosalpinx pustulosus – type locality for species
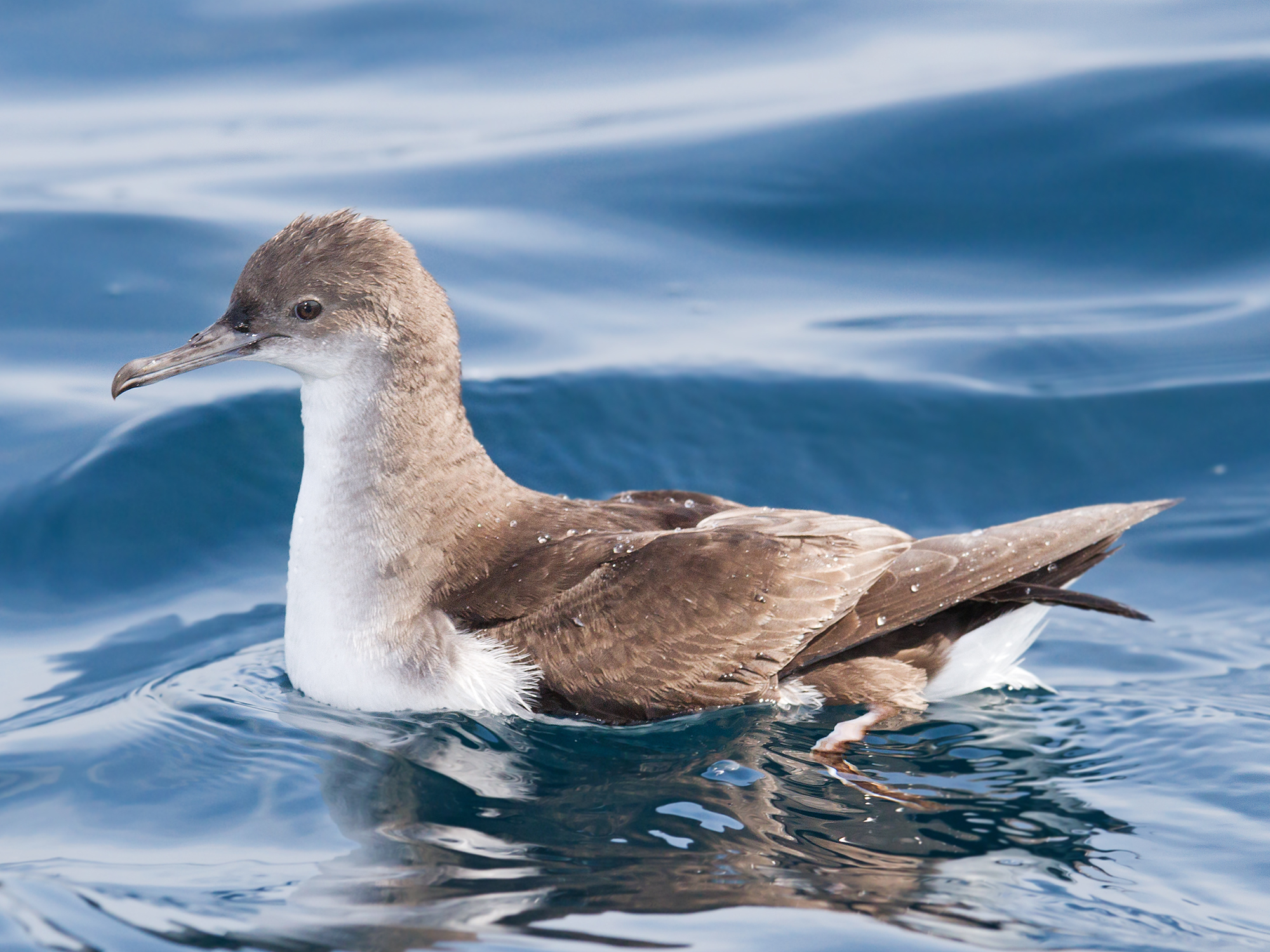
- A living Puffinus shearwater
  Puffinus
  - †Puffinus conradi – type locality for species
- Pycnodonte
  - †Pycnodonte percrassa
- †Pyropsis – tentative report

== Q ==
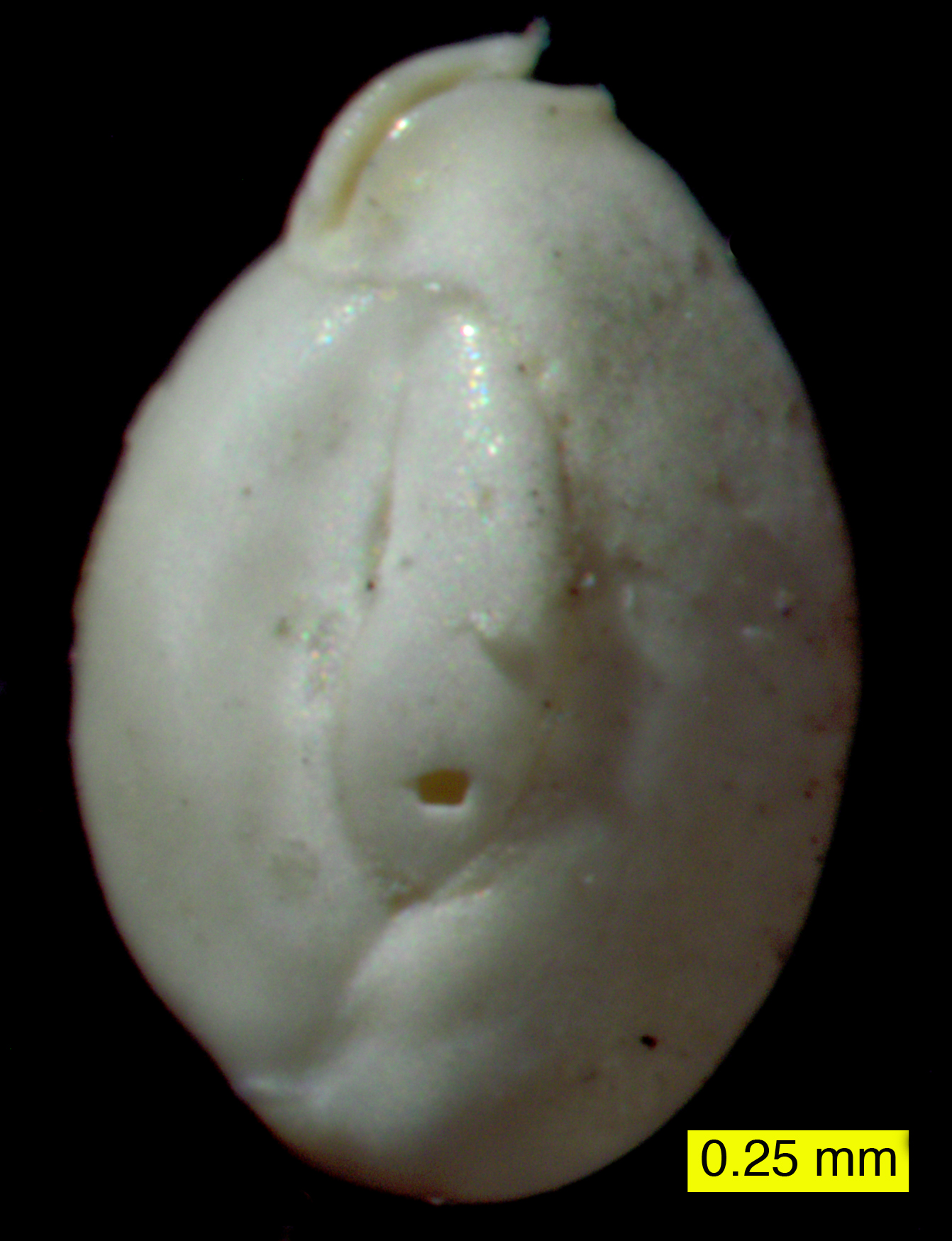
- Shell of a Quinqueloculina foraminiferan
  Quinqueloculina
  - †Quinqueloculina flexuosa
  - †Quinqueloculina seminula

== R ==
- †Rana
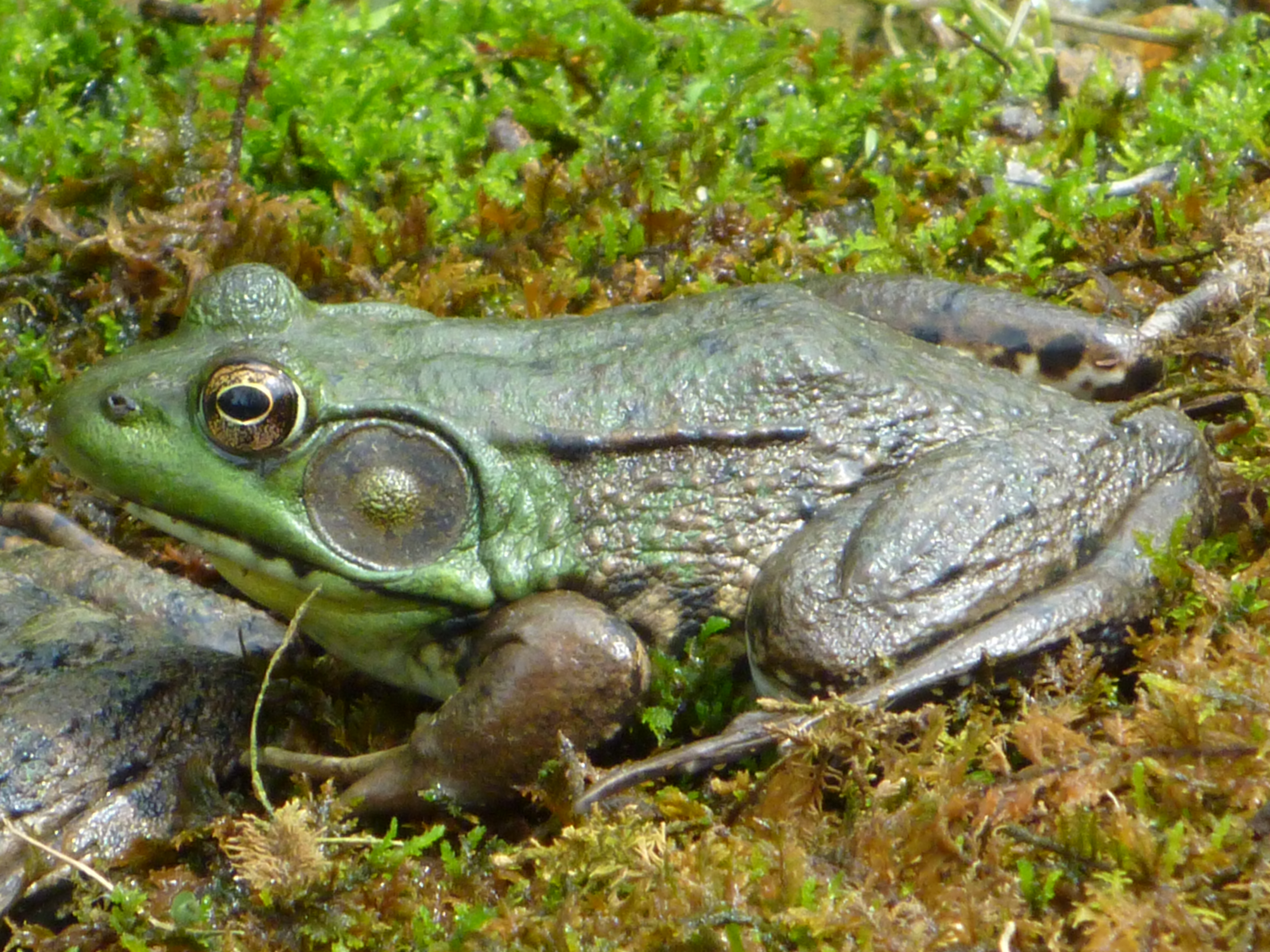
  - A living Lithobates clamitans (sometimes Rana clamitans), or green frog
    †Rana clamitans
  - †Rana pipiens
  - †Rana sylvatica
- Rangia
  - †Rangia cuneata
- Ranzania
- †Reticulatosphaera
  - †Reticulatosphaera actinocoronata
- Retusa
  - †Retusa conulus
  - †Retusa marylandica
  - †Retusa sylvaerupis
- †Rhabdosteus – type locality for genus
  - †Rhabdosteus latiradix – type locality for species
- Rhinoptera
- Rhynchobatus
  - †Rhynchobatus pristinus
- †Roccus
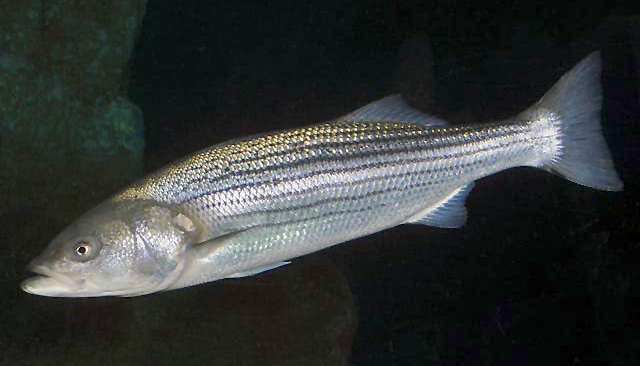
  - A living Morone saxatilis (formerly Roccus saxatilis), or striped bass
    †Roccus saxatilis
- †Rotalia
  - †Rotalia beccardi
  - †Rotalia beccarii

== S ==
- Saccella
  - †Saccella parva
- Salamandra
  - †Salamandra opaca
- †Sangamona
  - †Sangamona fugitiva
- †Scala
  - †Scala marylandica
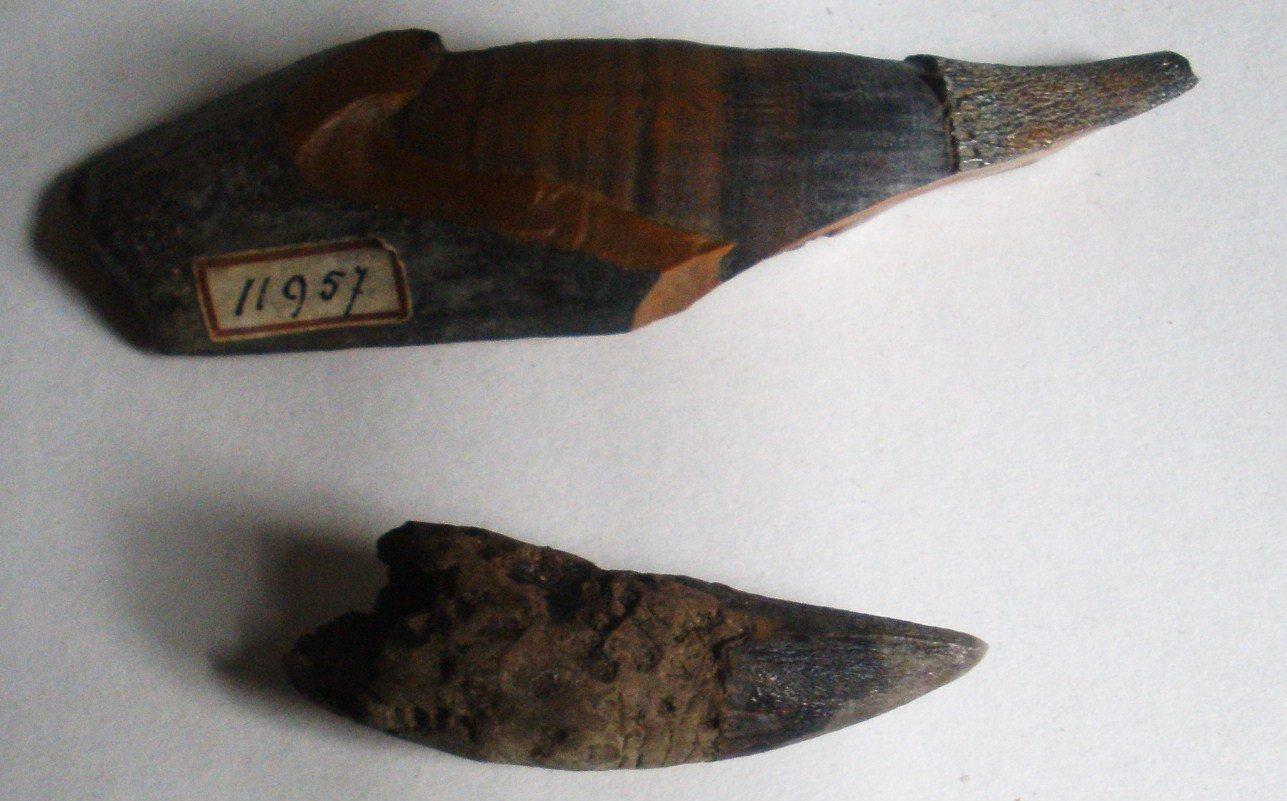
- Fossilized teeth of the Neogene sperm whale Scaldicetus
  †Scaldicetus
- †Scapanorhynchus
  - †Scapanorhynchus subulatus – tentative report
- Scaphander
  - †Scaphander potomacensis – type locality for species
- Scaphella – type locality for genus
  - †Scaphella solitaria
  - †Scaphella virginiana
- Sceloporus
  - †Sceloporus undulatus – or unidentified comparable form
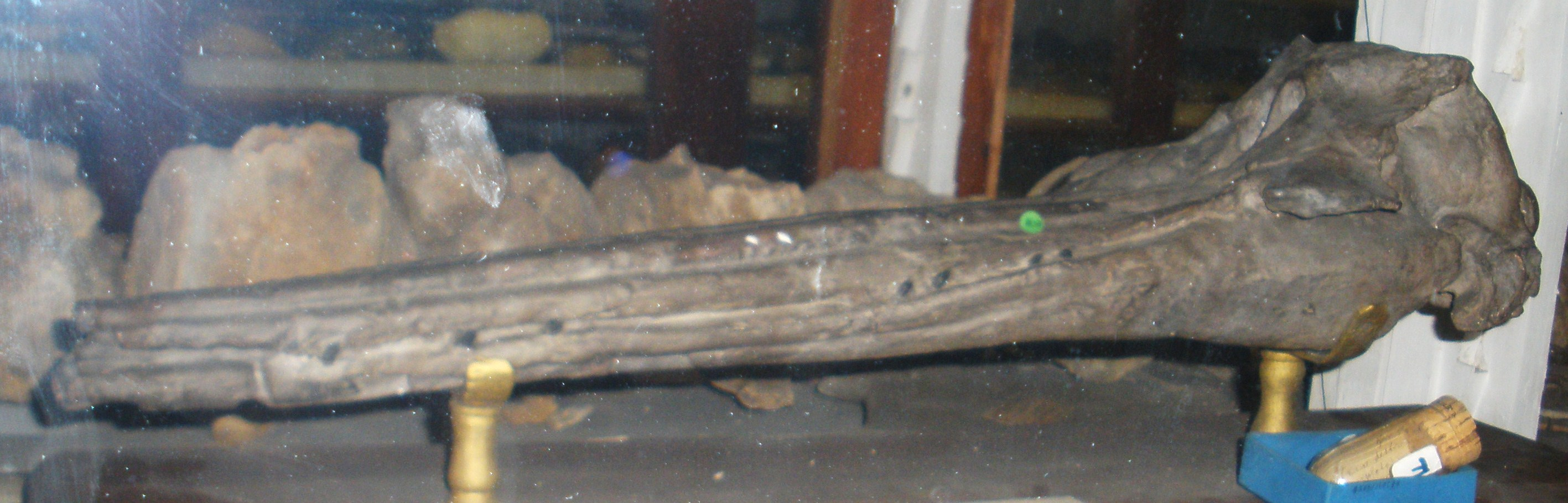
- Fossilized skull of the Miocene toothed whale Schizodelphis
  †Schizodelphis
  - †Schizodelphis barnesi
  - †Schizodelphis sulcatus
- Schizoporella
  - †Schizoporella unicornis
- Sciaenops
  - †Sciaenops eastmani
- Sciuropterus
  - †Sciuropterus volans
- Sciurus
  - †Sciurus carolinensis
- †Scutella
  - †Scutella aberti
- †Sediliopsis – type locality for genus
  - †Sediliopsis gracilis
- Seila
  - †Seila adamsii
- Semele – tentative report
- Semele
  - †Semele carinata
  - †Semele subovata
- Serpulorbis
  - †Serpulorbis granifera
  - †Serpulorbis graniferus
- †Sigmesalia
  - †Sigmesalia palmerae – type locality for species
- Siphonalia
  - †Siphonalia devexus
  - †Siphonalia potomacensis – type locality for species
- †Siphonocetus
  - †Siphonocetus clarkianus
  - †Siphonocetus priscus
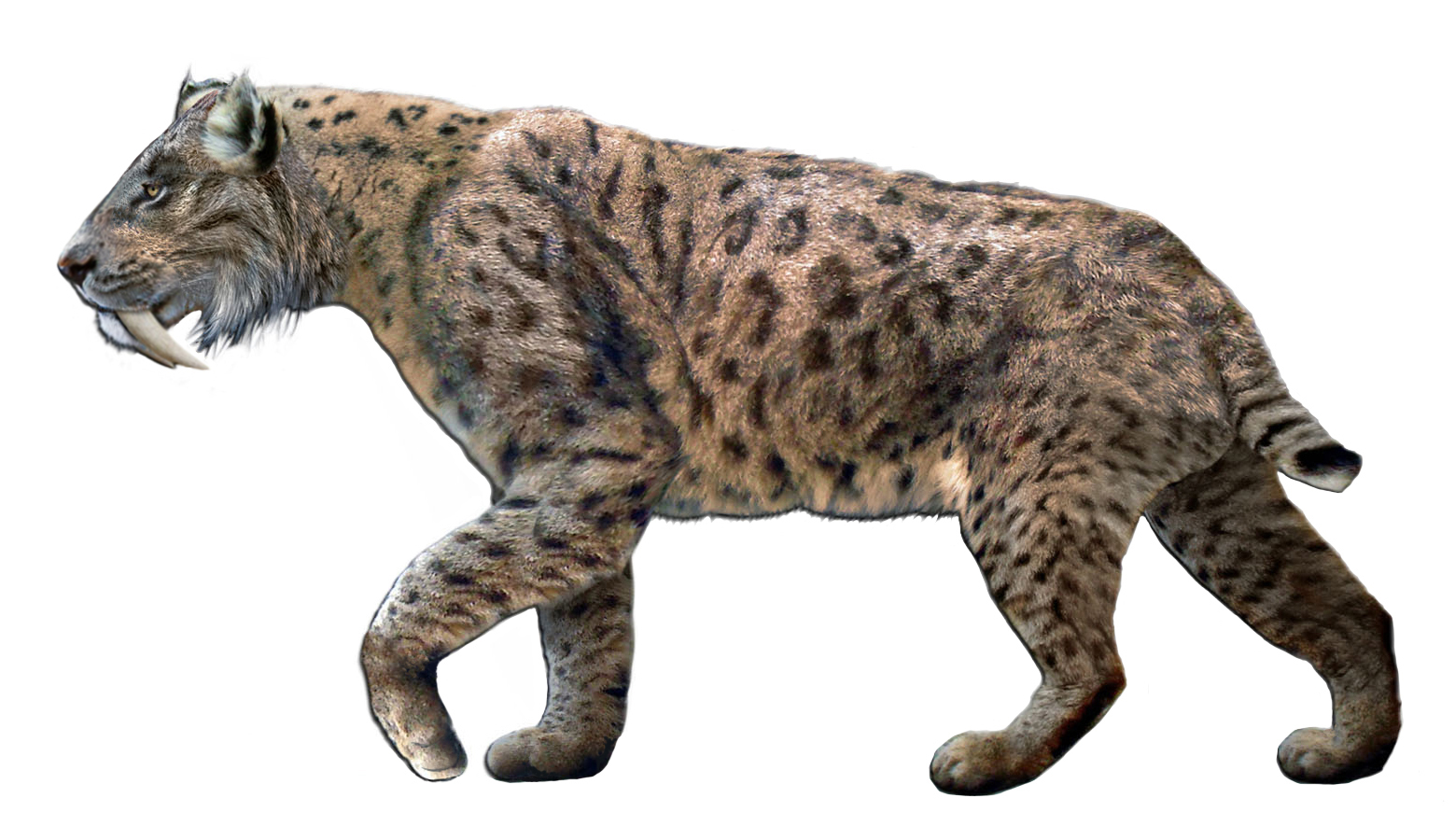
- Life restoration of the Pleistocene-Holocene saber-tooth cat Smilodon
  †Smilodon
  - †Smilodon fatalis
- †Smilodontopis
  - †Smilodontopis mooreheadi
- Solariorbis
  - †Solariorbis form A informal
  - †Solariorbis laurelae – type locality for species
  - †Solariorbis lipara
- †Solarium
  - †Solarium trilineatum
- Solecardia
  - †Solecardia cossmani
- Solen
- Sorex
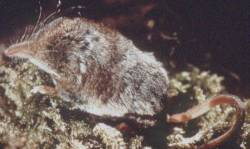
  - A living Sorex cinereus, or cinereus shrew
    †Sorex cinereus
  - †Sorex fumeus
- Spermophilus
  - †Spermophilus tridecemlineatus
- †Sphaerula
  - †Sphaerula subvexa
- Sphenia – tentative report
- †Sphyraenodus
  - †Sphyraenodus speciosus
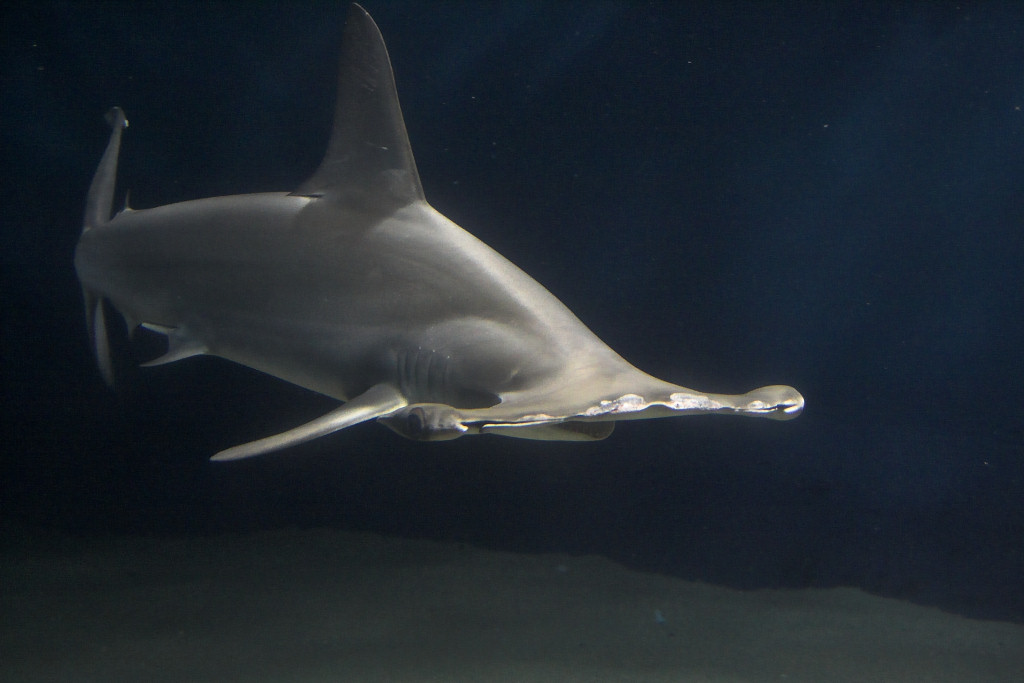
- A living Sphyrna hammerhead shark
  Sphyrna
  - †Sphyrna laevissima – type locality for species
  - †Sphyrna magna
  - †Sphyrna prisca
- Spilogale
  - †Spilogale putorius – type locality for species
- †Spiniferites
  - †Spiniferites mirabilis
- Spiroplectammina
  - †Spiroplectammina spinosa
- Spisula
  - †Spisula subcuneata
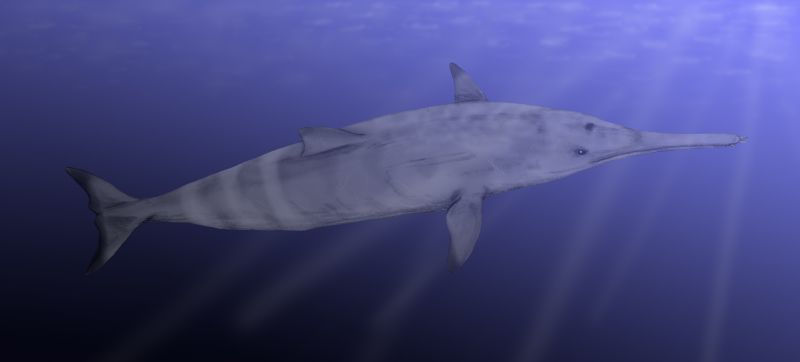
- Life restoration of the Oligocene-Miocene shark-toothed dolphin Squalodon
  †Squalodon
  - †Squalodon atlanticus
  - †Squalodon calvertensis – type locality for species
  - †Squalodon mento – type locality for species
  - †Squalodon protervus
  - †Squalodon whitmorei
  - †Squalodon wymanii – type locality for species
- Squatina
  - †Squatina occidentalis – type locality for species
- Squilla
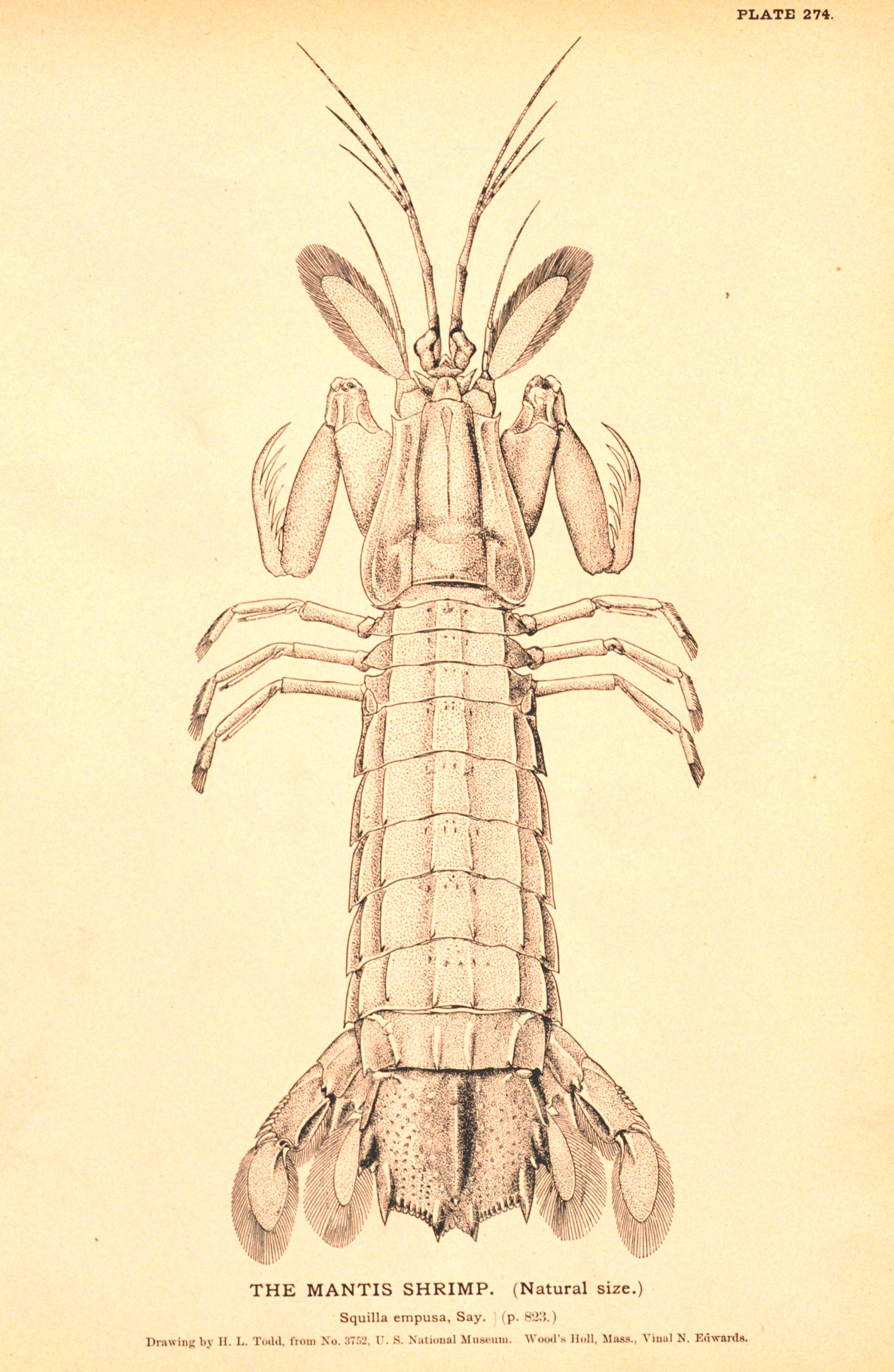
  - Illustration of a living Squilla empusa mantis shrimp
    †Squilla empusa
- †Stenasodelphis – type locality for genus
  - †Stenasodelphis russellae – type locality for species
- Stewartia
  - †Stewartia anodonta
  - †Stewartia foremani
- Sthenorytis
  - †Sthenorytis pachypleura
- Stramonita
  - †Stramonita haemostoma
- †Strepsidura
- Strioterebrum
  - †Strioterebrum dislocatum
- Stylopoma
  - †Stylopoma spongites
- †Sumatradinium
  - †Sumatradinium druggii
- †Syllomus
  - †Syllomus aegyptiacus – type locality for species
- Sylvilagus
  - †Sylvilagus floridanus
- Synaptomys
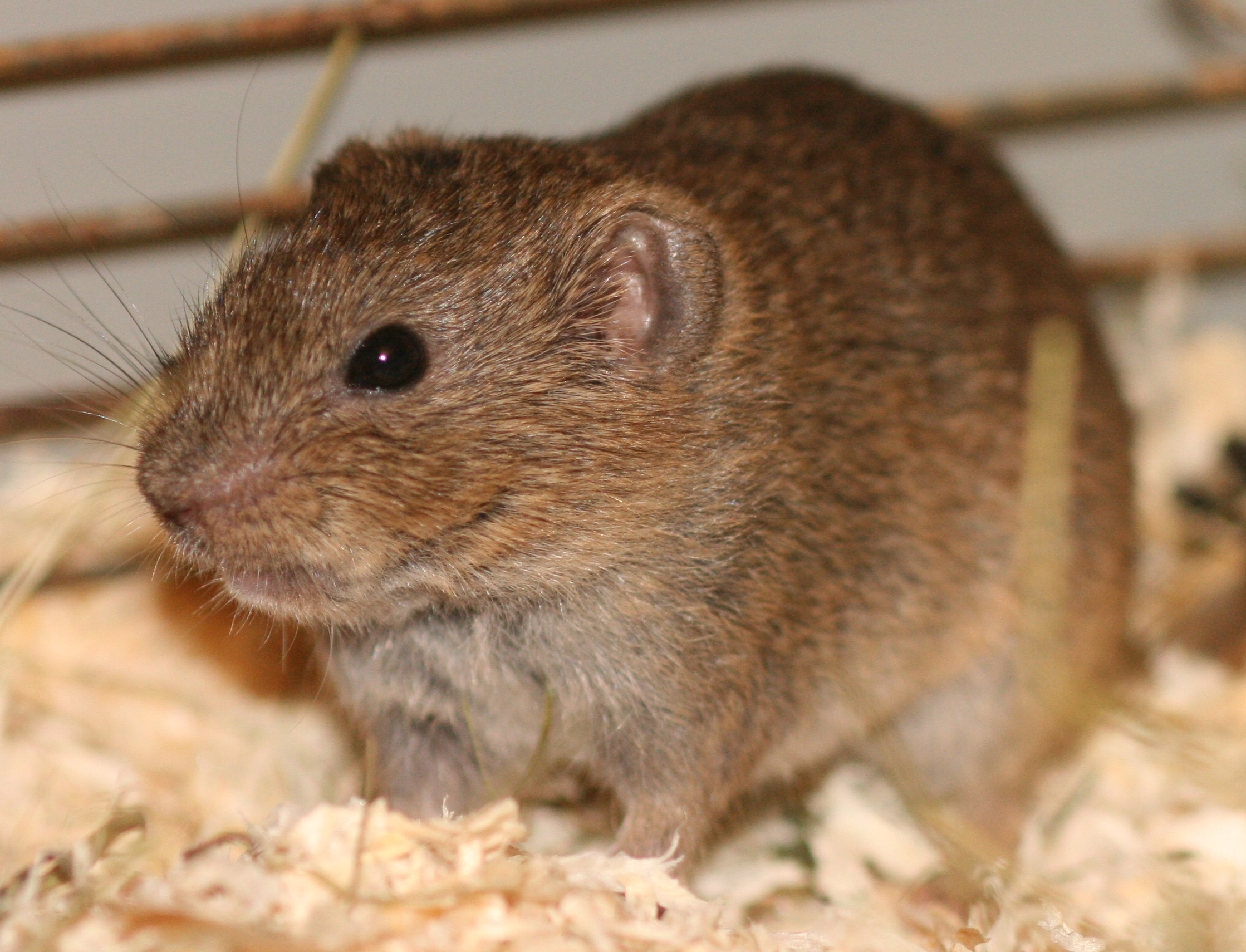
  - A living Synaptomys cooperi, or southern bog lemming
    †Synaptomys cooperi
- †Synechodus
  - †Synechodus clarki
  - †Synechodus clarkia
- Syrnola
  - †Syrnola toulmini – type locality for species

== T ==
- Tagelus
  - †Tagelus plebeius
- Tamias
  - †Tamias striatus
- Tamiasciurus
  - †Tamiasciurus hudsonicus
- †Taphrosphys
  - †Taphrosphys miocenica – type locality for species
- †Tapiravus
  - †Tapiravus validus – or unidentified comparable form
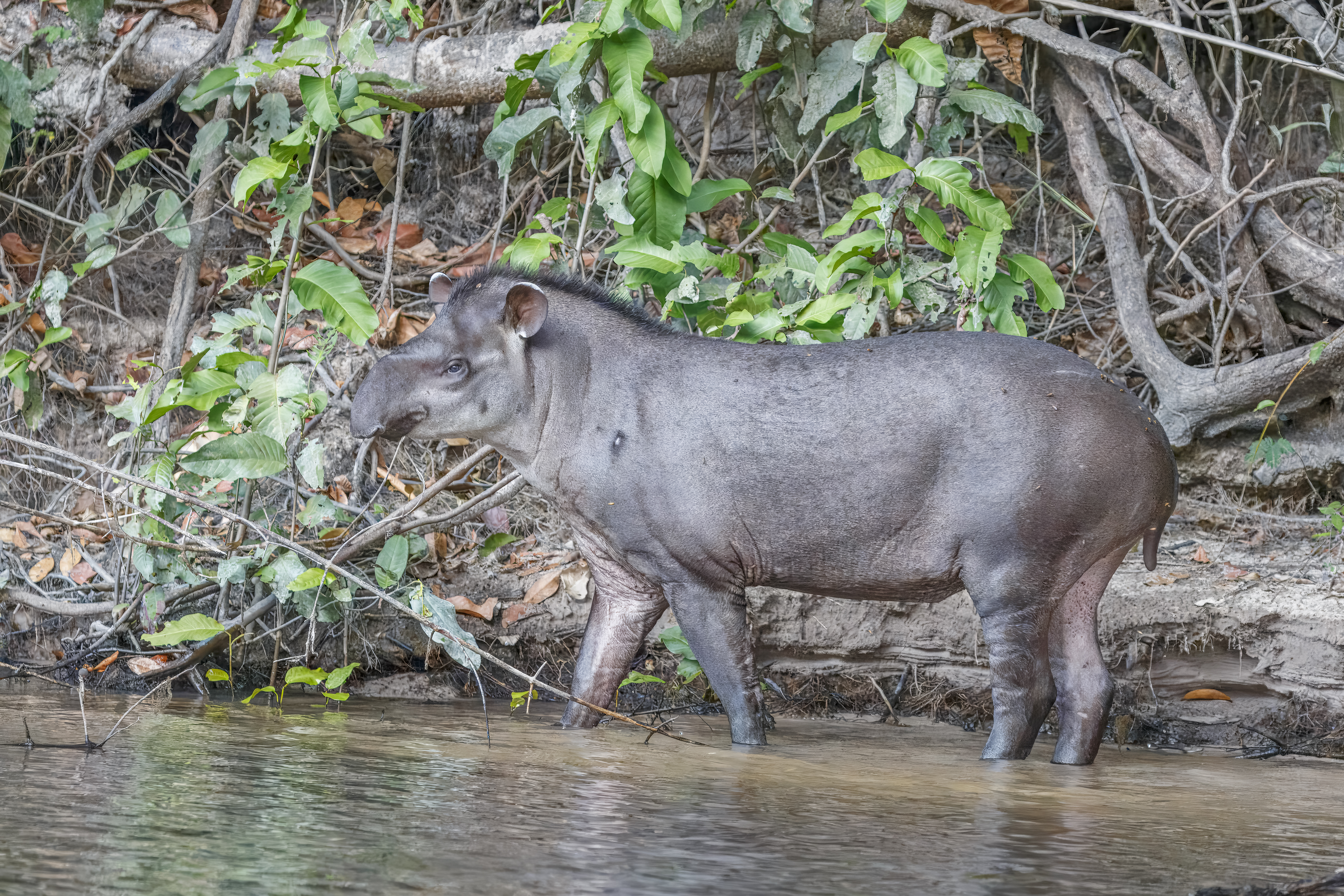
- A living Tapirus, or tapir
  Tapirus
  - †Tapirus haysii – or unidentified comparable form
- †Tasbacka
  - †Tasbacka ruhoffi – type locality for species
- Taxidea
  - †Taxidea taxus – type locality for species
- †Tectatodinium
  - †Tectatodinium pellitum
- Teinostoma
  - †Teinostoma barryi
  - †Teinostoma umbilicatum
- Tellina
  - †Tellina virginiana
  - †Tellina williamsi
- Terebra
  - †Terebra curvilirata
  - †Terebra inornata
- Terebratula
  - †Terebratula marylandica – type locality for species
- Teredo
  - †Teredo virginiana
- Terrapene
  - †Terrapene carolina
- Testudo
  - †Testudo ducateli – type locality for species
- Textularia
  - †Textularia ultimainflata
- Thamnophis
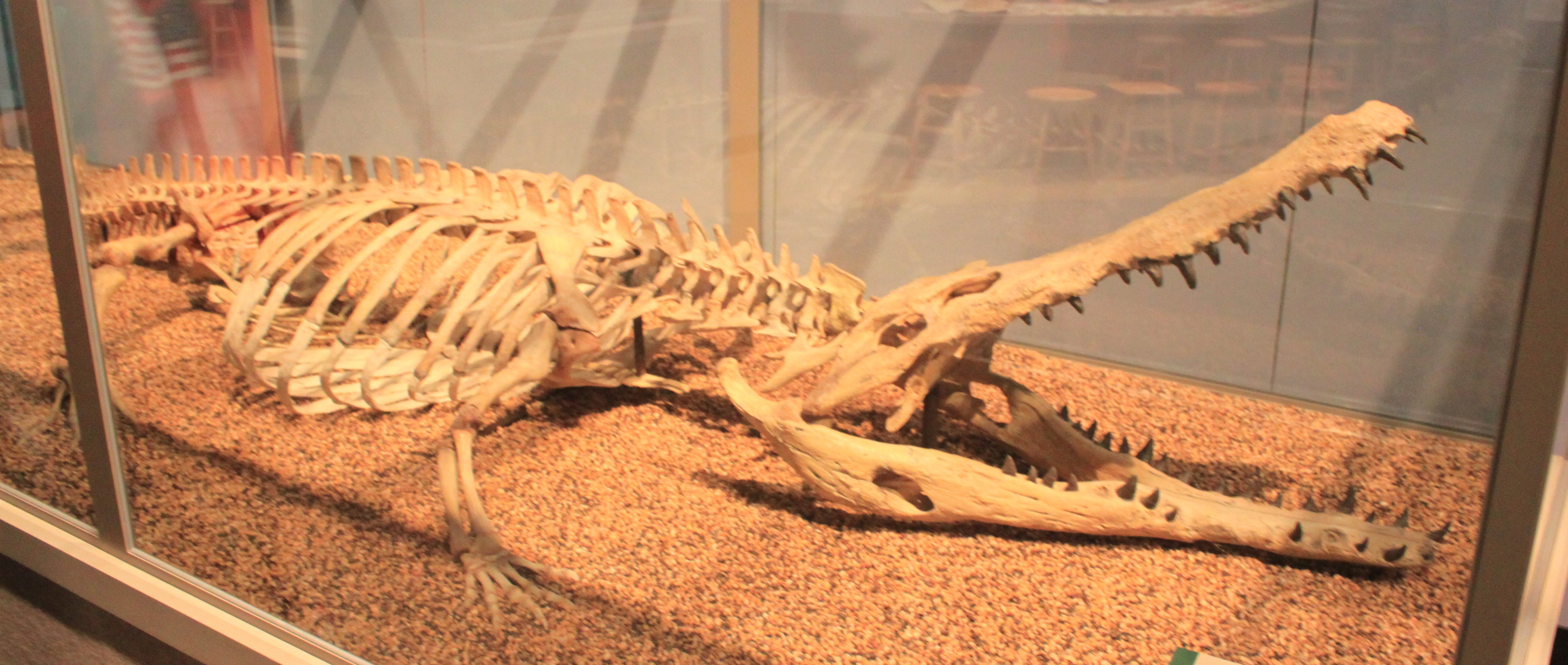
- Fossilized skeleton of the Oligocene-Miocene gavial relative Thecachampsa
  †Thecachampsa
  - †Thecachampsa antiqua
  - †Thecachampsa marylandica – type locality for species
- †Thinocetus
  - †Thinocetus arthritus
- Thomomys – type locality for genus
  - †Thomomys potomacensis – type locality for species
- Thracia
  - †Thracia conradi
- Torcula
  - †Torcula variabilis
- †Tornatellaea
  - †Tornatellaea texana
- Torquesia
  - †Torquesia prehumerosa – type locality for species
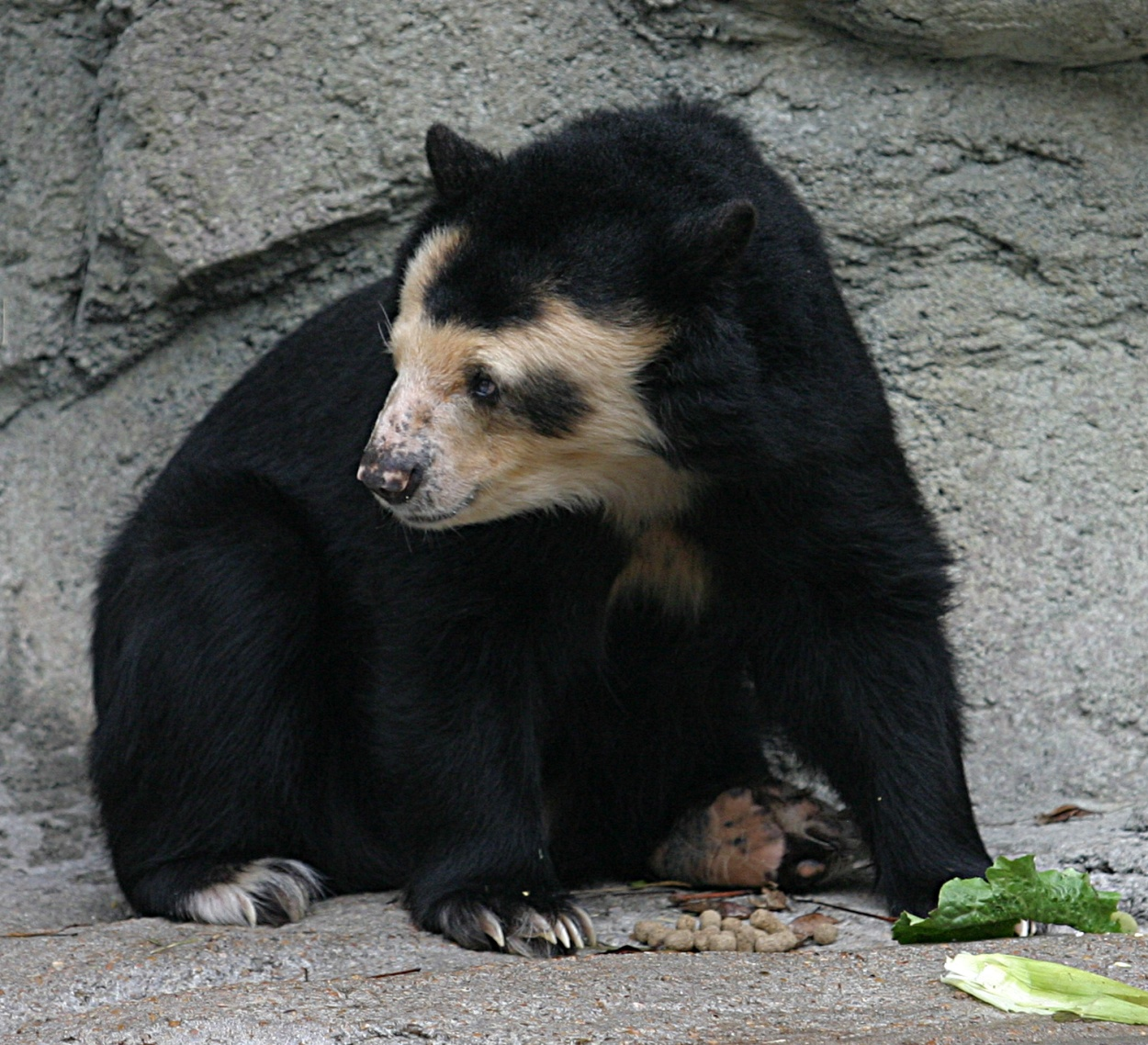
- A living Tremarctos, or spectacled bear
  Tremarctos
  - †Tremarctos floridanus
- †Tretosphys
  - †Tretosphys lacertosus – type locality for species
  - †Tretosphys ruschenbergeri – type locality for species
- Triloculina
  - †Triloculina rotunda
- Trionyx – report made of unidentified related form or using admittedly obsolete nomenclature
  - †Trionyx halophilus
- Triphora
  - †Triphora tricincta
- Tritonium
  - †Tritonium centrosum – type locality for species
- Trochita
  - †Trochita aperta
- †Trygon
  - †Trygon dux
- †Tuba – tentative report
- †Tuberculodinium
  - †Tuberculodinium vancampoae
- Tudicla – or unidentified comparable form
- Turricula – report made of unidentified related form or using admittedly obsolete nomenclature
- †Turrifulgur – type locality for genus
  - †Turrifulgur turriculus – type locality for species
- Turris – report made of unidentified related form or using admittedly obsolete nomenclature
  - †Turris piscatavensis
  - †Turris tysoni
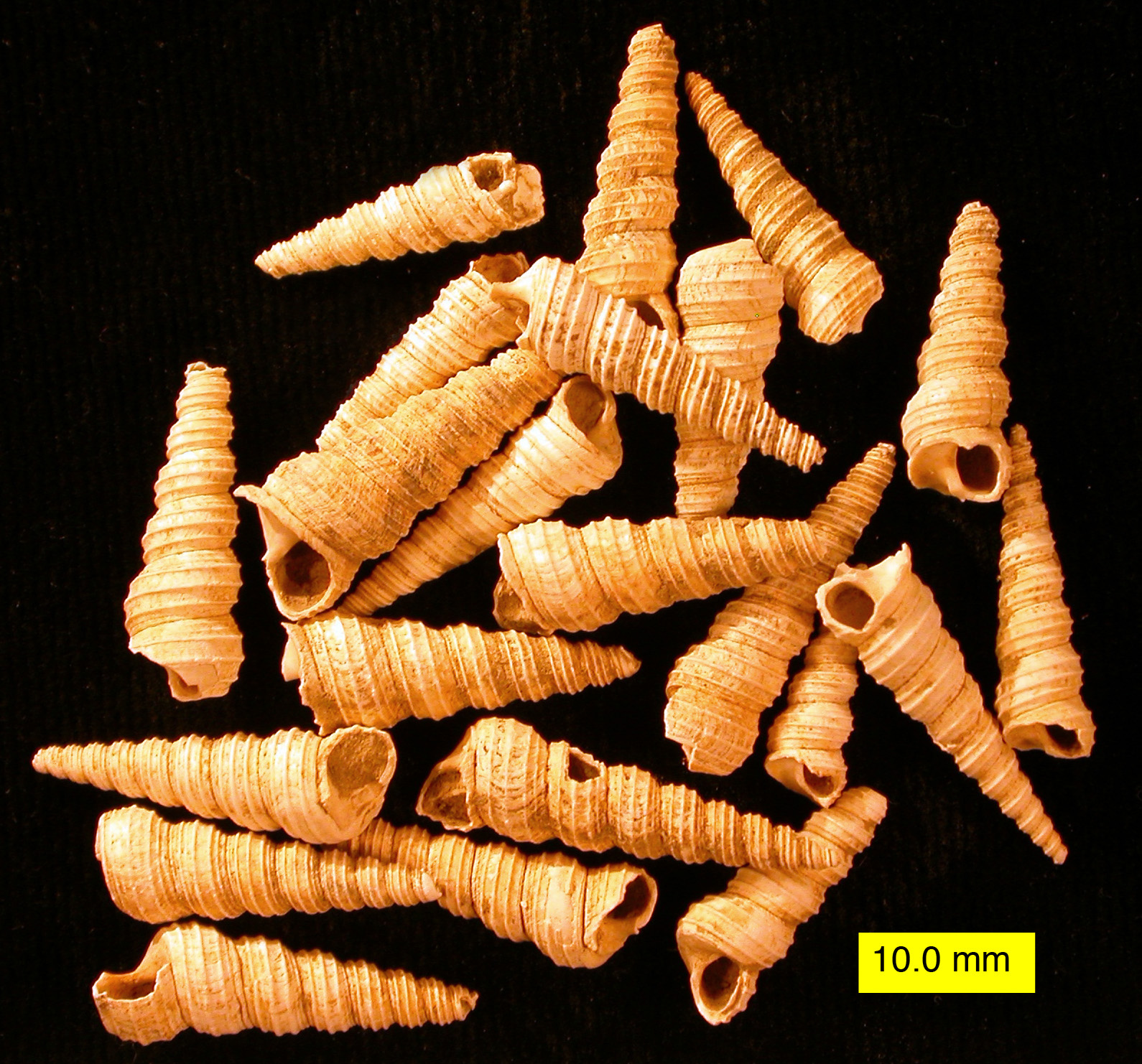
- Fossilized shells of the Late Jurassic-modern tower snail Turritella
  Turritella
  - †Turritella alticostata
  - †Turritella exaltata
  - †Turritella humerosa
  - †Turritella indenta
  - †Turritella indentata
  - †Turritella plebeius
  - †Turritella plebeua
  - †Turritella potomacensis
  - †Turritella subponderosa
  - †Turritella subvariabilis
  - †Turritella terebriformis
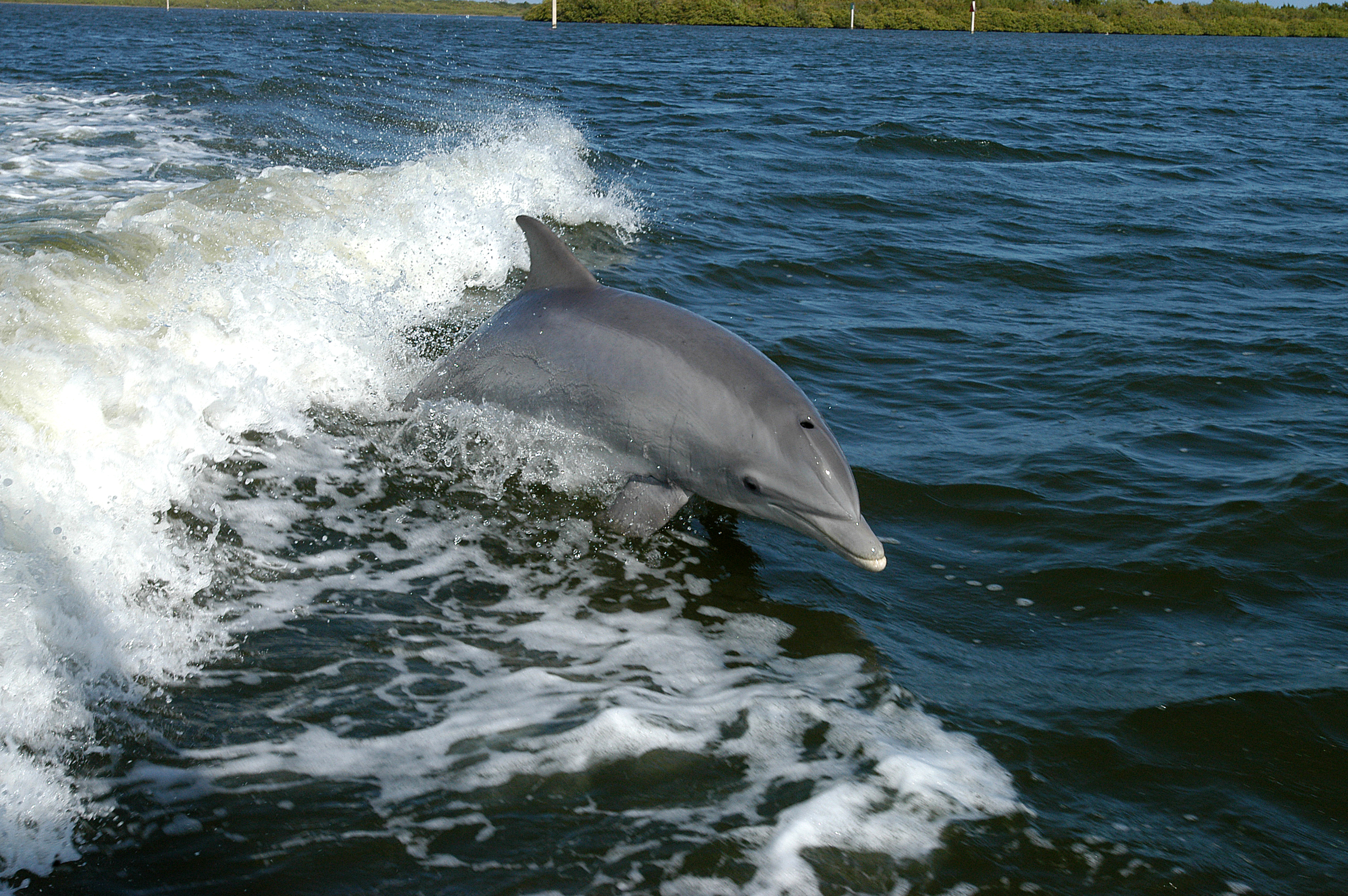
- A living Tursiops, or bottlenose dolphin
  Tursiops
- Typhis
  - †Typhis acuticosta

== U ==
- Umbraculum – tentative report
- Urosalpinx
  - †Urosalpinx cinerea
  - †Urosalpinx subrusticus
- Ursus
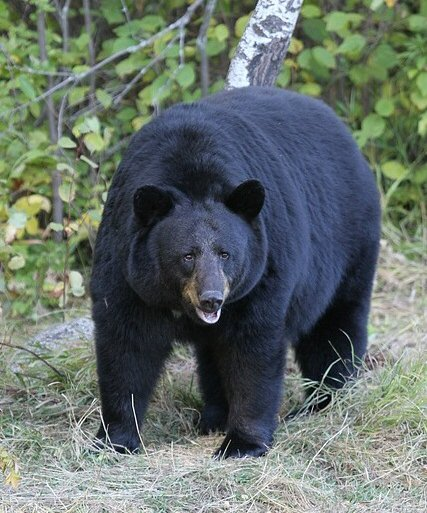
  - A living Ursus americanus, or American black bear
    †Ursus americanus

== V ==
- Venericardia
  - †Venericardia ascia
  - †Venericardia potapacoensis
  - †Venericardia regia
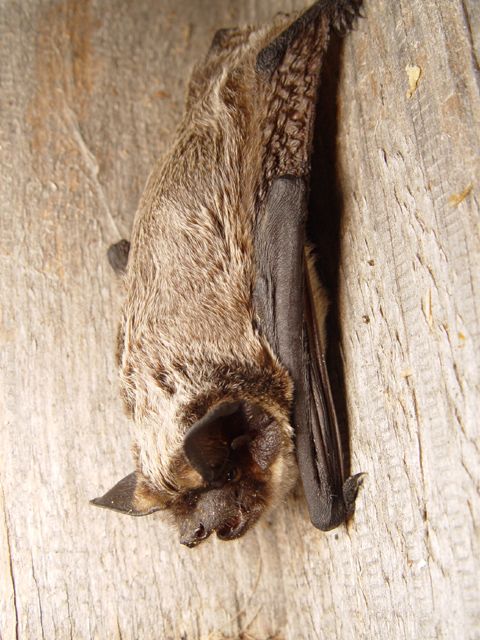
- A living Vespertilio bat
  Vespertilio
  - †Vespertilio grandis
- Vitrinella
  - †Vitrinella clarkmartini – type locality for species
- Volutifusus
  - †Volutifusus acus – type locality for species
  - †Volutifusus asheri – type locality for species
  - †Volutifusus marylandicus – type locality for species
  - †Volutifusus meganucleus – type locality for species
  - †Volutifusus mutabilis
- Volvulella
- Vulpes

== X ==
- Xestoleberis
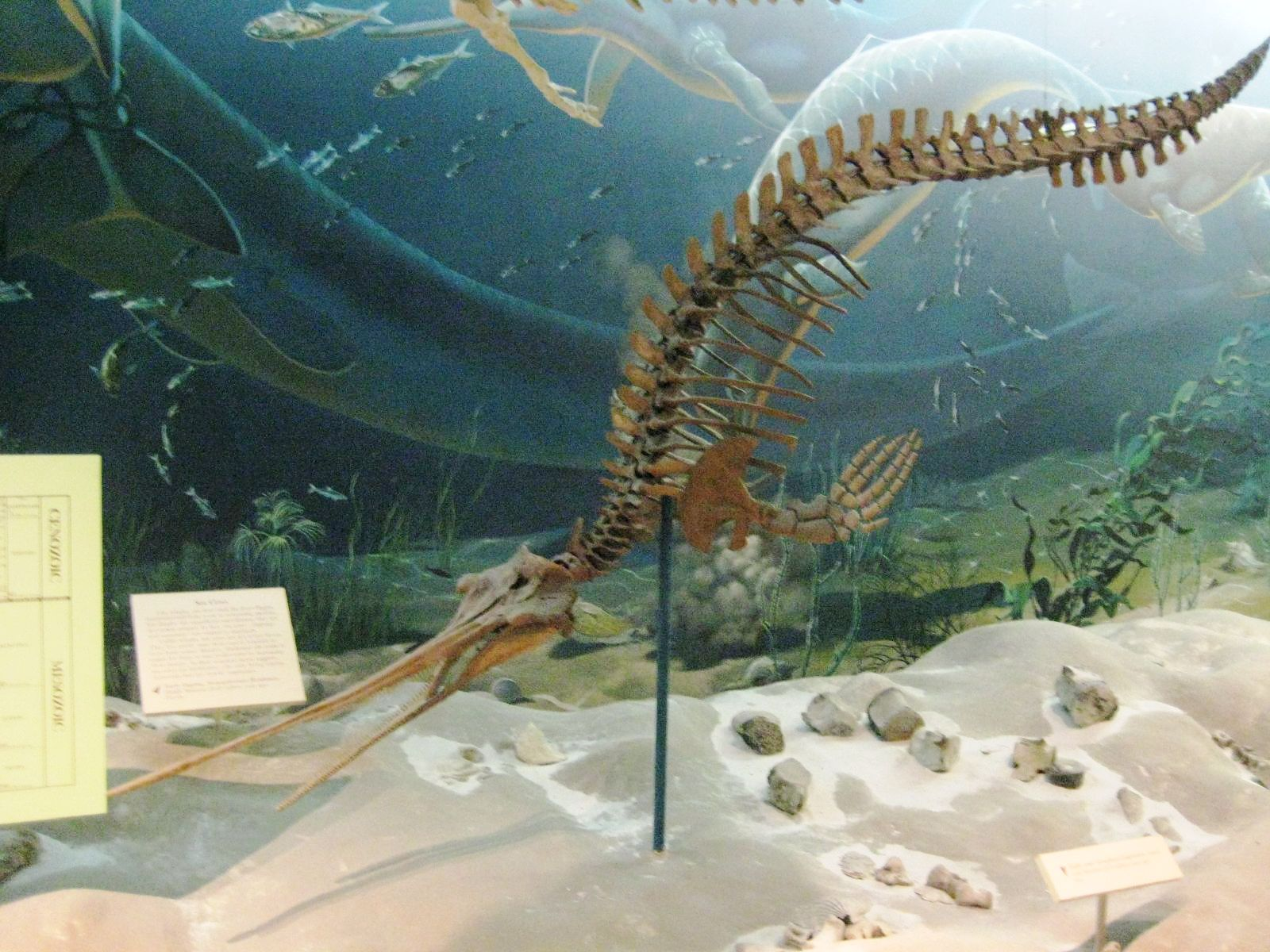
- Fossilized skeleton of the Miocene whale Xiphiacetus
  †Xiphiacetus
  - †Xiphiacetus bossi – type locality for species
  - †Xiphiacetus cristatus – type locality for species
- Xiphias
  - †Xiphias radiata – tentative report

== Y ==
- Yoldia
  - †Yoldia laevis
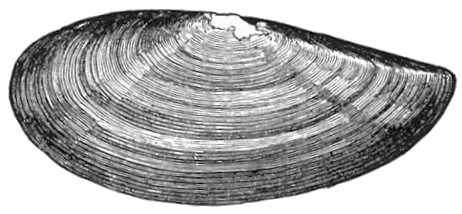
  - Illustration of the shell of a Yoldia limatula, or file yoldia
    †Yoldia limatula
  - †Yoldia potomacensis
- †Yolida

== Z ==
- †Zarhachis – type locality for genus
  - †Zarhachis crassangulum – type locality for species
  - †Zarhachis flagellator – type locality for species
  - †Zarhachis tysonii – type locality for species
- †Zikkuratia
  - †Zikkuratia danica – type locality for species
- †Zizyphinus
  - †Zizyphinus bryanii – type locality for species
