= Kathetostoma canaster =

Scientific classification
- Kingdom: Animalia
- Phylum: Chordata
- Class: Actinopterygii
- Order: Labriformes
- Family: Uranoscopidae
- Genus: Kathetostoma
- Species: K. canaster

Binomial name
- Kathetostoma canaster Gomon & Last, 1987

Species of ray-finned fish

Kathetostoma canaster, also known as the speckled stargazer, is a ray-finned fish species described in 1987. It is native to the Eastern Indian Ocean.
