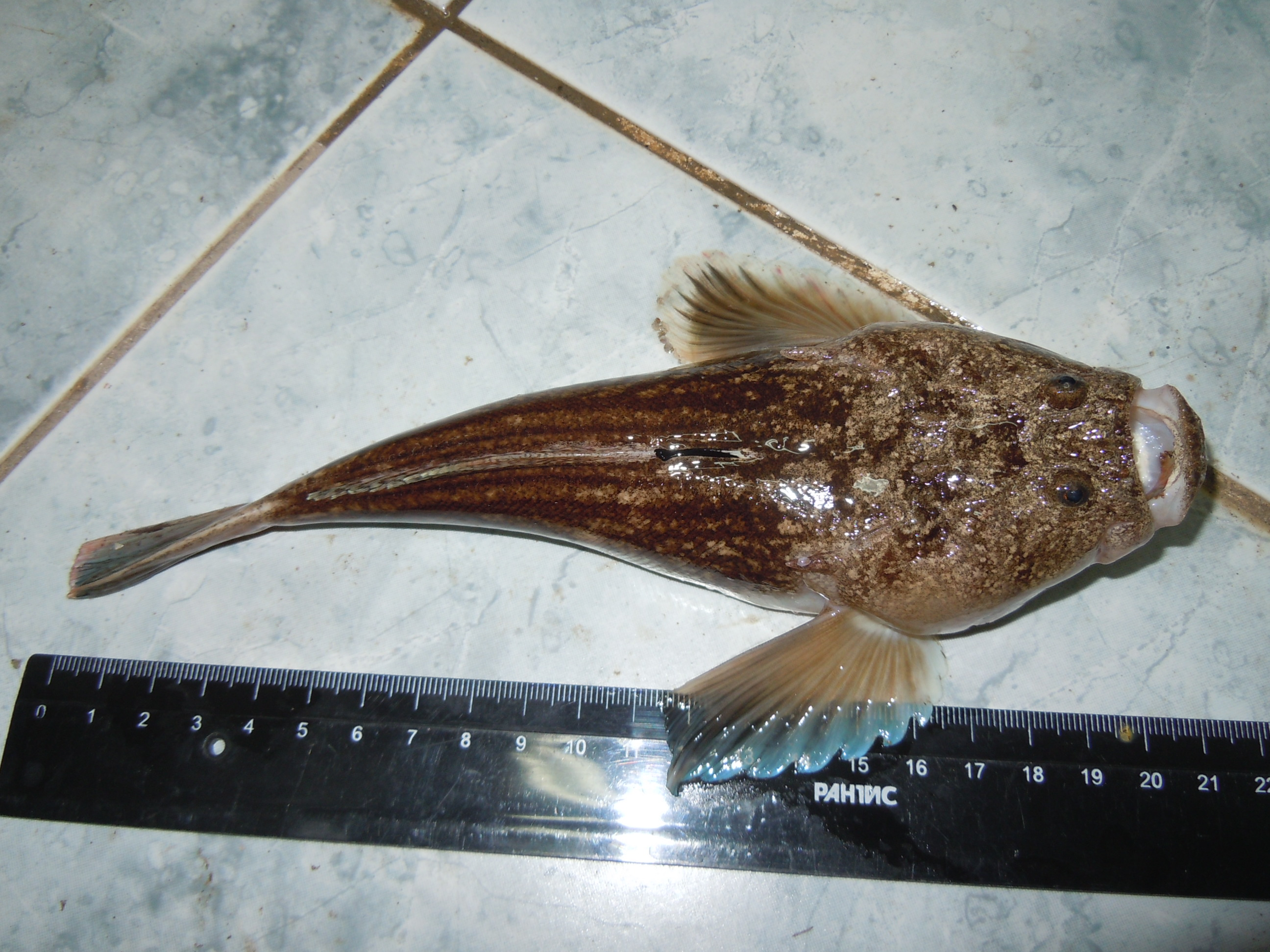
- Atlantic stargazer from the Black Sea

Conservation status
- Least Concern (IUCN 3.1)

Scientific classification
- Kingdom: Animalia
- Phylum: Chordata
- Class: Actinopterygii
- Division: Teleostei
- Order: Labriformes
- Family: Uranoscopidae
- Genus: Uranoscopus
- Species: U. scaber

Binomial name
- Uranoscopus scaber Linnaeus, 1758

Synonyms
- Callionymus araneus Gronow, 1854; Cottus anostomus Pallas, 1814; Uranoscopus bufo Valenciennes, 1843; Uranoscopus cocius Rafinesque, 1810; Uranoscopus mus Lacépède, 1800; Uranoscopus occidentalis Agassiz, 1831

= Atlantic stargazer =

Species of fish

The Atlantic stargazer (Uranoscopus scaber) is a marine ray-finned fish in the stargazer family Uranoscopidae. It is one of few fish capable of bioelectrogenesis.

== Distribution and habitat ==
The Atlantic stargazer is widespread along the Atlantic coast of Europe and Africa (however, it is somewhat rare in the Bay of Biscay), and is also common in the Mediterranean Sea and the Black Sea. It is a demersal fish, living in sandy or muddy sand sediments along the upper slope of the continental shelf, at depths of 14–400 m (46–1,312 ft). It is not a very economically important fish (and is primarily caught as by-catch), but is ecologically important.

== Description ==
Typical of its family, the body of the Atlantic stargazer is somewhat dorsoventrally flattened, the head and jaws are oriented upwards, and the mouth is large. Its body is brown in color and has numerous small light spots, with a lighter belly. It lacks a swimbladder. The Atlantic stargazer is usually between 20–30 cm (7.9–11.8 in) in length, but may reach 35 cm (14 in), with females generally being larger than males. It lives for about 5 to 6 years.

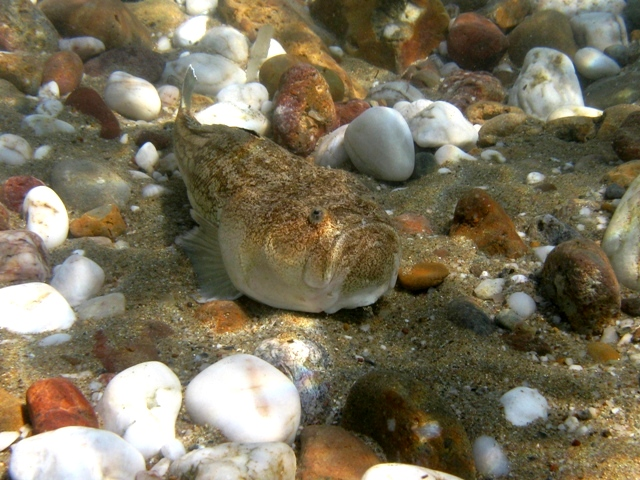
In Paros, Greece

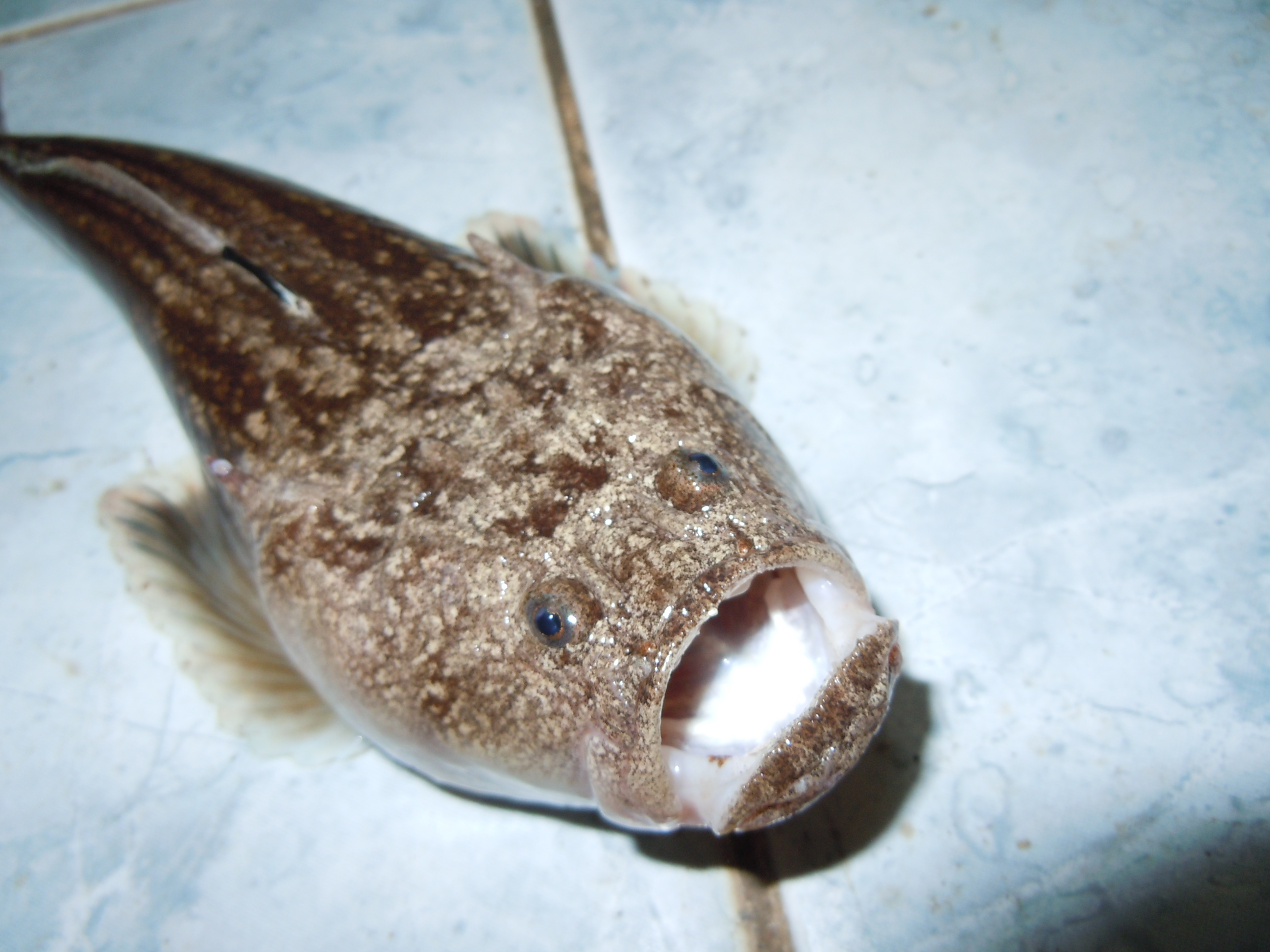
From the Black Sea

== Biology ==
=== Feeding ===
Like other stargazers, the Atlantic stargazer is an ambush predator which lies buried with only its eyes exposed. It has a small strip of skin protruding from its lower jaw, which it moves in and out rapidly to act as a lure for prey. When a prey item comes near, it lunges towards the prey using a specially adapted vertebral column, and it takes less than 30 milliseconds for it engulf the prey. The Atlantic stargazer feeds primarily on fish larvae, smaller fish (such as gobies and picarels) and small crustaceans, but is also known to eat molluscs, echinoderms, annelids and algae (and other plant material).

=== Reproduction ===
The Atlantic stargazer spawns between April and September, depending on the region, and produce pelagic eggs about 2 mm in diameter. After hatching, the larvae, post-larvae, and juveniles remain pelagic. Males are slightly more common than females, but this can vary within local populations.

=== Bioelectrogenesis ===
All species within the genus Uranoscopus have evolved an electric organ (derived from sonic muscles) but lack a receptor organ (so they can create electric fields but cannot electrolocate). The Atlantic stargazer uses the electric organ to produce pulse-type electric organ discharges when feeding and when disturbed.
