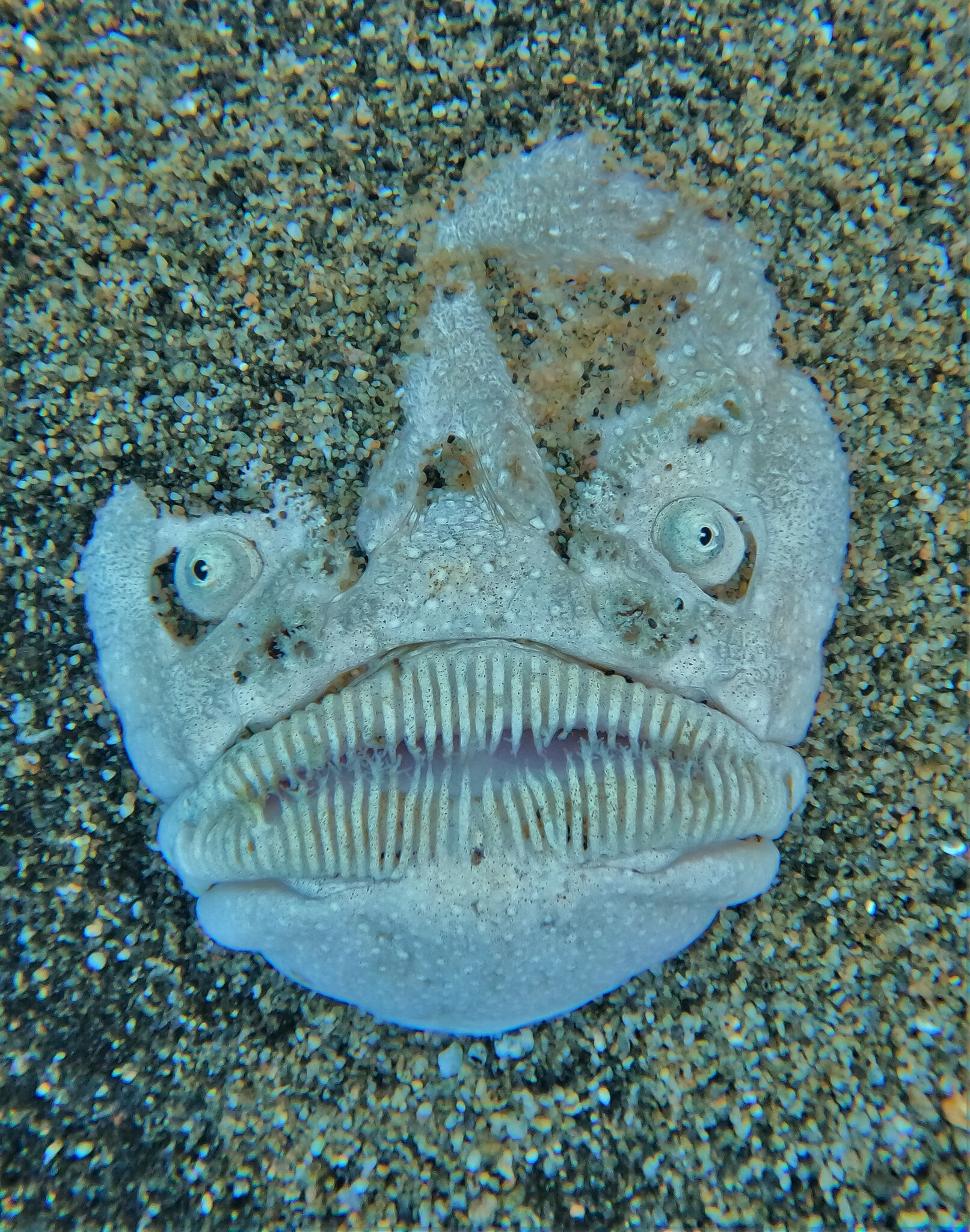

Conservation status
- Least Concern (IUCN 3.1)

Scientific classification
- Kingdom: Animalia
- Phylum: Chordata
- Class: Actinopterygii
- Order: Labriformes
- Family: Uranoscopidae
- Genus: Astroscopus
- Species: A. zephyreus

Binomial name
- Astroscopus zephyreus (Gilbert & Starks, 1897)

= Astroscopus zephyreus =

Pacific Stargazer

Species of ray-finned fish

Astroscopus zephyreus, the pacific stargazer, is a species of electric stargazer (Astroscopus) found off the coast of Southern California to Peru. The pacific stargazer is a bottom-dwelling fish that can be found at depths of 15 to 385 metres (50 to 1,260 ft) . Like other Astroscopus, pacific stargazers have an electric organ located vertically behind the eyes.
