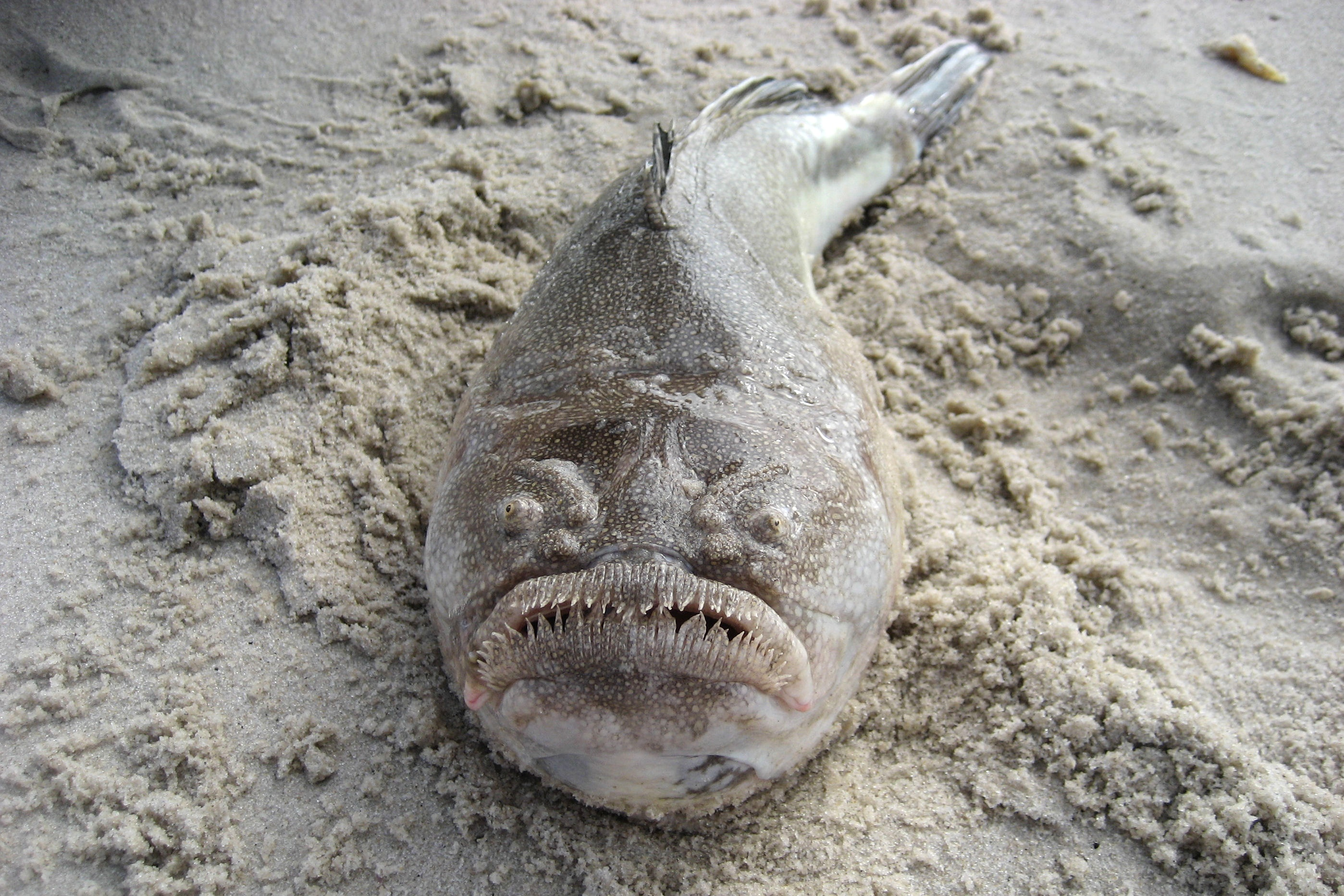

Conservation status
- Least Concern (IUCN 3.1)

Scientific classification
- Kingdom: Animalia
- Phylum: Chordata
- Class: Actinopterygii
- Division: Teleostei
- Order: Labriformes
- Family: Uranoscopidae
- Genus: Astroscopus
- Species: A. guttatus

Binomial name
- Astroscopus guttatus Abbott, 1860

= Astroscopus guttatus =

Northern stargazer

Species of fish

Astroscopus guttatus or the northern stargazer is a species of fish belonging to the Uranoscopidae family and was first described by Charles Conrad Abbott in 1860. Members of the Uranoscopidae family are characterized by dorsally or dorsolaterally directed eyes placed on or near the top of a large, flattened cuboid head, an oblique to vertical mouth often lined with cutaneous cirri, and an elongated, sub-compressed body. Typically found on the Atlantic shores between the states of North Carolina and New York in the United States, the northern stargazer can sometimes be confused with its sister species the southern stargazer, Astroscopus y-graecum. Both A. guttatus and A. y-graecum overlap in their distributions in Cape Hatteras One way to distinguish the northern stargazer from the southern stargazer is by the presence of numerous small white spots closely spaced along its head and back, whereas the southern stargazer has fewer, larger spots on its back. The northern stargazer is a moderately sized fish that can reach lengths of 22 inches (56 cm). The northern stargazer can be found buried in sandy substrate at depths up to 120 feet (37 m) where the species remains buried awaiting prey. Stargazers have a flat forehead with a lot of body mass near the mouth creating a body plane optimal for remaining buried under sandy substrate.

== Description ==
The northern stargazer has a blackish brown body covered in white spots that gradually increase in size towards the rear of the body. It has three dark horizontal stripes on its (white) tail. Another identifying feature for stargazers is the location of the lateral line. In most fish species the lateral line follows a straight direction or gentle curve on the side of the body. But in Astroscopus, the lateral lines that begin on the gill opening then run upward at a sharp angle until the two lines lie almost together, one on each side of the dorsal fin. This adaptation allows the fish to remain buried while keeping the lateral line operational. The southern stargazer, A. y-graecum, closely resembles the northern stargazer in appearance and life history. Two ways to tell the two species apart look at the size and density of white spots on the back of the fish. The northern stargazer possesses more closely set white spots compared to the southern stargazers large more spaced spots. Another way to tell the difference between the two is to look at the difference in tail striping among the two. The northern stargazer's middle tail stripe extends on the rear portion of the body. Whereas on the southern stargazer, the stripe does not extend past the tail. Northern stargazers have a robust body filled with small scales that becomes slender posteriorly. In addition, the fish have four to five short spines on the dorsal fin and 13 to 15 rays on the second dorsal fin. Their anal fin has one spine along with 12 rays. The northern stargazer has many adaptations that aid in its sand-dwelling lifestyle. First being the overall depressed shape of the stargazer. Stargazers have a flatted elongated body with a large head and eyes that are positioned on the top of their heads as opposed to the side. The strategic placement of the eyes on the top of the head allows for their eyes to remain functional despite being buried. In addition to the location of the eyes, stargazers—as well as other bottom dwelling fish—have the ability to change the height of their eyes by filling tissues at the back of the eye with body fluid. Stargazers also have ventral fins that have been moved forward in such a way that they assist with digging. A. guttatus has pectoral fins that act as shovels allowing the fish to bury itself in seconds. The mouth of the stargazer faces up so that it can ambush prey while hiding in the sandy bottoms of coastal bodies of water. In addition to placement of their mouth, Astroscopus fish can breathe when the water is full of sand or when buried due to a row of fine comb-like structures on the edge of each jaw. These comb-like serrations are positioned in a way that when the jaw is closed, they interlock allowing water to flow through but preventing sand. The top of the stargazer has electric organs in the orbitae which can generate and transmit an electric shock. The electric apparatus is composed of two organs, which form two vertical columns roughly oval in horizontal section and placed behind and somewhat under each eye. It is composed of about 200 thin layers of electric tissue.

== Distribution ==
Astroscopus guttatus is typically found in coastal waters from New York to Virginia. But there have been sightings of the northern stargazer in the waters of South Carolina. Northern stargazers can be found in deep ocean water at depths up to 120 feet or 37 meters. The northern stargazer enjoys rocky reef and soft bottom habitats. In places lacking natural reefs, scientists experimented with placing oyster cages on the bottom of the ocean floor. These scientists observed an increase in fish diversity including an increase in northern stargazer sightings following the addition of the oyster cage as the cage created additional reef like habitat for fish.

== Ecology ==
Northern stargazers live primarily along the eastern seaboard of the United States. They do not swim much except when migrating as they swim clumsily and slowly. Instead, northern stargazers bury themselves in the sand using short side to side motions of their ventral fins and tail to bury themselves until three quarters of their body plane is covered by sandy substrate. If disturbed, stargazers can bury themselves beneath as many as 12 inches of sand to hide from predators. Stargazers utilize their camouflaged location in the sand to wait for prey to swim by. Northern stargazers primarily feed on small fish that swim above them in the sand. Their eyes are situated on top of the head and poke up through the sand, hence the name stargazer. The eyes of the northern stargazer are also home to an electrical organ that sits under each eye. The electrical apparatus is composed of 200 thin layers of electric tissue which gives it a jelly or mucus like appearance. The origin of this organ is still undetermined with the best logical supposition that the electric organ was derived by an unusual modification of a portion of one or more of the eye muscles. The organ is believed to not only threaten predators from above as the fish lies buried in the sand, but also to stun prey. The stargazer's scientific name is Astroscopus guttatus where Astroscopus means "one who aims at the stars" and guttatus translating into "speckled"—referring to the white spots on the fish's back.

== Life cycle ==
Stargazers lay small, transparent eggs on the bottoms of bays in the late spring early summer. These eggs float to the surface after they are released. They hatch into larvae which grow up to 6–7 mm (0.24–0.28 in). From there, the fish will continue to grow rapidly as it lives on its yolk sac. When the fish reaches 6–7 millimeters long, it will begin eating other nearby younger fish larva. After approximately one month, the fish will slowly grow a dark coloring and develop the electrical organs from eye muscles when they are 12–15 mm (0.5–0.6 in). As a juvenile, the northern stargazer travels in schools as it leaves the shoreline during the winter to avoid the severe cold only returning to the bay in the spring. After four to six years the fish grows to 12–13 inches in length and then migrates to the sandy bottoms some distance off the coast where it lives permanently. This is also when the fish becomes reproductively active releasing eggs and sperm in the early spring and breeding around May or June.

== Conservation status ==
The northern stargazer was most recently assessed by the IUCN Red List of Threatened Species in 2014 and was listed as Least Concern. The current population trend for the species is unknown and there is no known major threat. As for use and trade, the northern stargazer occurs rarely as bycatch in bottom trawls but is not utilized.

== Taxonomy ==
The northern stargazer was first described by Charles Conrad Abbott in 1860.

== See also ==
- Electric fish
- Electric organ (fish)
- Astroscopus sexspinosus
