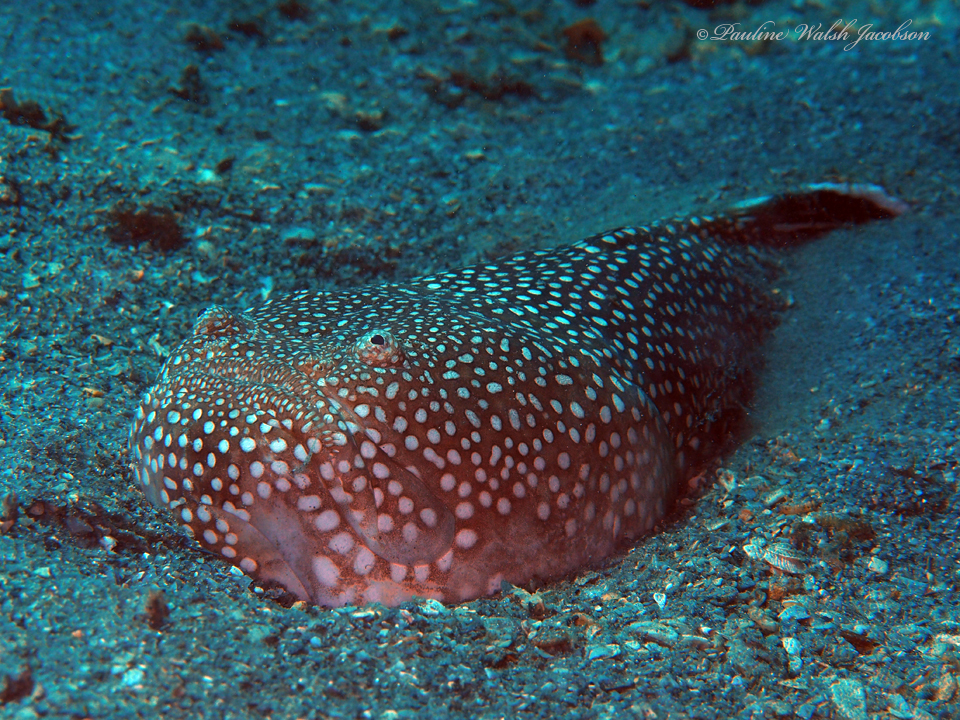

Conservation status
- Least Concern (IUCN 3.1)

Scientific classification
- Kingdom: Animalia
- Phylum: Chordata
- Class: Actinopterygii
- Order: Labriformes
- Family: Uranoscopidae
- Genus: Astroscopus
- Species: A. y-graecum

Binomial name
- Astroscopus y-graecum (Cuvier, 1829)

Synonyms
- Uranoscopus y-graecum Cuvier, 1829

= Southern stargazer =

Species of fish

The southern stargazer (Astroscopus y-graecum) is a species of marine fish in the family Uranoscopidae and genus Astroscopus. They are native to the United States.

== Description ==
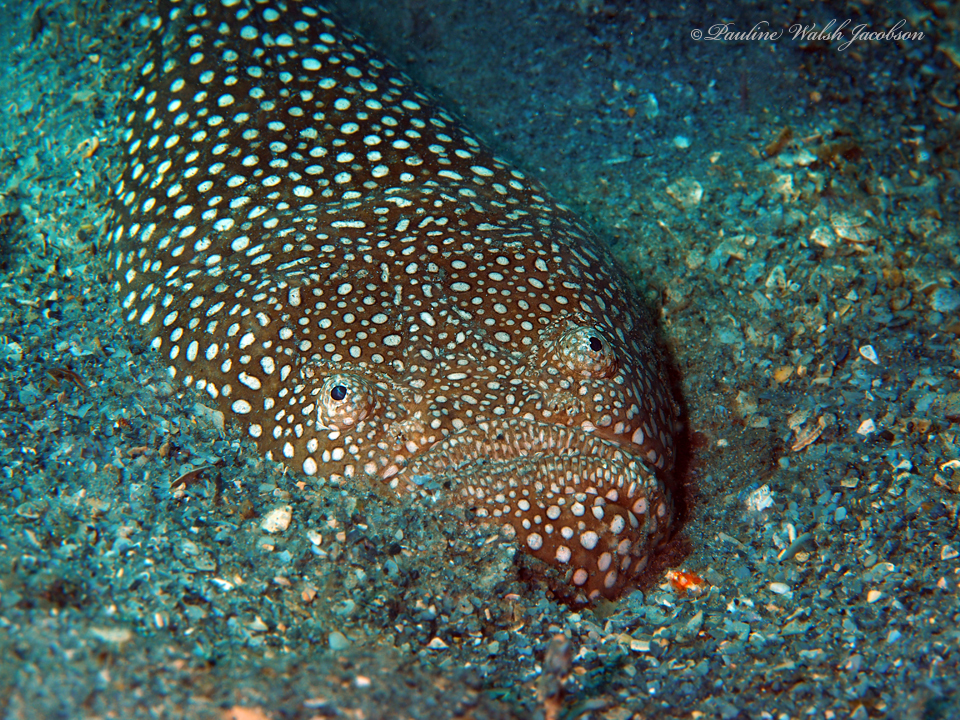
In Florida

Southern stargazers are able to reach a maximum size of 440 millimetres (17 in). These fish have a brownish body color with small white spots, and their pectoral fins are lined in black and white. Their tails have three black or brown stripes on the caudal. They use their pectoral fins to dig and bury themselves in the sediment. They have 8 dorsal spines, 13–14 soft dorsal rays, no anal spines, and 13 soft anal rays. They have a cleithral spine that has a venom gland. When they bury themselves in the sand they leave their eyes, nostrils, and most of their mouth above the sand. In order to breathe they take water in through the nostrils which are protected from the sand by fleshy comb-shaped fringes; the mouth also has these fringes. These fish do not have scales on the top of their heads, but have them on the rest of their bodies extending onto the fleshy part of the caudal fin. Their eyes are able to protrude slightly from the head appearing stalked, and this is to allow them to see above the sand. By using an organ located in a pouch behind their eyes they are able to create an electrical current. They are able to generate a voltage as strong as 50 volts, and this is mainly used for protection instead of a way to capture their prey. The discharge of this organ depends on the temperature of the water.

== Electric defense ==
A unique trait of the Southern Stargazer is its ability to use an electric organ. This adaptation is unique due to the fact that the Southern Stargazer is one of a few teleosts that has this ability. This evolutionary ability is common with the genus Astroscopus, which includes the northern stargazer (A. guttatus) and the Brazilian stargazer (A. brasiliensis). The organ itself is derived from muscles that are located around the eye. There are a total of eight muscles that comprise the organ; out of those eight, six are evolved from around the eye. Some of the muscle groups that the organ is made up of are the medial rectus, the lateral rectus, the superior rectus, and the superior oblique muscle. The cells that allow the muscle to produce an electric current are referred to as electro plaques. These cells are aligned on the surface of the Stargazer’s head in a vertical column, also referred to as the dorsal side. They extend from the dorsal fin on the back of the fish down on the head and then come to a stop near the mouth. These electro plaque cells are aligned in an irregular overlapping pattern. This is different from other electrically conductive fish, such as the Torpedine. The Torpedine is a ray that is found in the Atlantic Ocean as well. Instead of irregularly placed electro plaques, the Torpedine has overlapping, uniformly layered cells. This is important when considering the difference in electric conductivity between the two fish. The Torpedine is able to get up to a max voltage of 220 volts, while the Southern Stargazer can only go up to about 50 volts. While Stargazers can conduct electricity, they are not the most effective at it. The cells that make up the organ are not very wide either; a single layer is about eight to ten cells wide. This width also fluctuates as it traverses the body, meaning variations in electrical current around the body. The widest section of the organ is typically found on the top side of the fish, and it is on average about 0.5 centimeters wide.

== Adaptations ==
The Southern Stargazer has evolved to hunt effectively through the use of a highly specialized body form, specifically the shape of its head. The skull of a stargazer is flat and wide; this extends to the tip of its mouth, giving the fish a flat-like surface from the base of the skull to the very end of the mouth. This adaptation is useful for hunting; while the fish buries itself into the sand, it can use its eyes and fins as lures. This allows the A. y-graecum to attract prey while being camouflaged safely under the sand.

Another evolved adaptation is in the specialized positioning and shape of the stargazer's fins. The caudal, pectoral, anal, and pelvic fins have evolved to be strong enough to bury its body within the sand. The pelvic fins in particular have shifted towards the pectoral fins to aid in burying most of its head. Another adaptation is the positioning of the eyes. The stargazer's eyes sit on the dorsal side of its head, looking towards the surface of the ocean. They also have the ability to protrude their eyes away from their body a small distance to use as a lure or attractant for prey. This adaptation allows the fish to keep watch for prey while being buried in the sand.

== Diet ==
They are predatory fish that lie in wait for smaller fish to swim near them while they are buried under the sand with their head the only thing that is not buried.

== Feeding behavior study ==
In a study conducted in 1979 by George H. Burgess from the University of North Carolina, he observed the unique feeding habits of A. y-graecum within an aquarium environment. The stargazer, unable to bury into the sand due to the harsh substrate used to line the bottom of the aquarium, took to a different form of hunting prey. Swimming with its head at a 30-degree angle, emphasizing its black lateral stripe running along the lateral side of its body. Burgess observed that when the stargazer was hungry, its body would turn a pale light yellow-gray. He was able to identify this change in behavior because the stargazer would begin stalking its prey only after it had changed color. Burgess also noted that the stargazer would attack fish that were of the same size as the stargazer and occasionally larger than its own size, never smaller. This was further reinforced by a previous study done in 1914, where they observed a similar feeding behavior. Another unique aspect of this type of hunting was that the stargazer always attacked its prey head-on. This is rather awkward for the stargazer, as its mouth and eyes do not point straight on but rather upwards towards the sky. This was demonstrated by the stargazer's many unsuccessful attempts at striking its victim. Burgess observed the fish often having to reposition itself and circling its prey. Once the stargazer was able to strike its victim, the prey gets swallowed into the stomach, in which the fish must greatly distend its abdomen. The prey within the stomach gets curled into a “u” shape, where it then continues to be digested. This curling phenomenon was also observed in nature. Although, in nature, when the stargazer is able to get the prey into the stomach, it immediately tries to rebury itself into the sand to digest. While the feeding behavior of the southern stargazer differs in an aquarium from in nature, different aspects, such as different ambush tactics and uses of electrical impulses, can still be further studied and explored, giving validity to the study.

== Habitat ==
The southern stargazers are benthic marine fish that are reef-associated. They live most of their lives inshore. Stargazers can be found at depths of 70 metres (230 ft) in areas that have sandy, silty, or soft rubble bottoms.

== Reproduction and life cycle ==
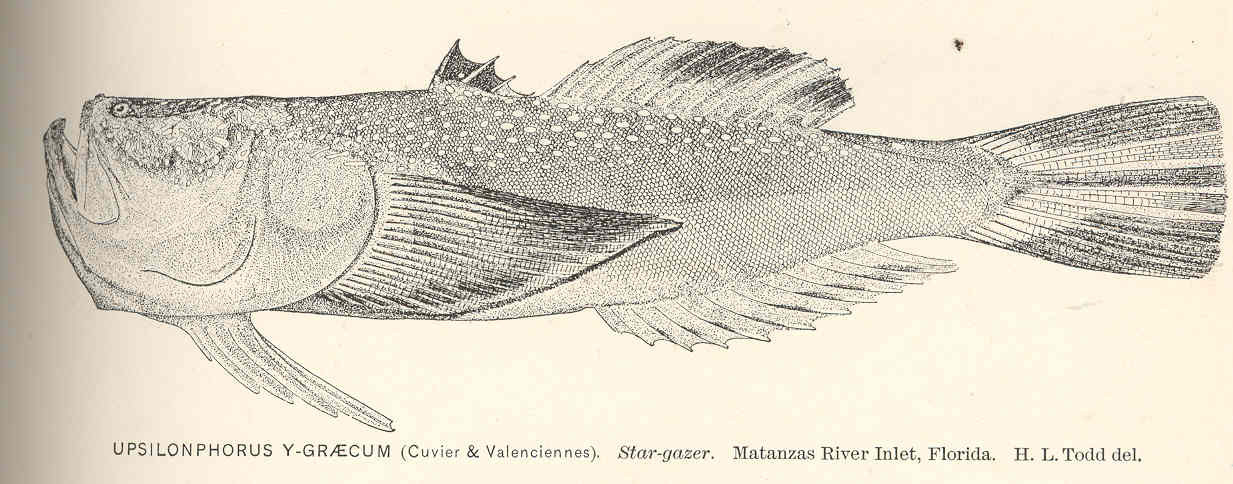
Illustration

Spawning occurs in the late spring and early summer months. They spawn on the bottom and their small transparent eggs slowly rise to the surface. When the eggs hatch the larvae are transparent that live in the water column. The larvae feed on their yolk sac until they reach a length of about 6–7 millimetres (0.24–0.28 in). Once they reach this size they start to feed off of other larvae in the water column. When they reach about 12–15 millimetres (0.47–0.59 in) in length their electric organs begin to form on the larvae, and they begin to head to the bottom and become a true juvenile. The juveniles are likely to move inshore to sandy bay, and may stay there for many years. This is where the juveniles develop the characteristics that the adults have. The eye will move to the top of the head, on the juvenile they are on the side of the head. Once they reach about 30 centimetres (12 in) in length they will move offshore and become adults.

== Distribution ==
The southern stargazer is found in the western Atlantic from North Carolina, and south along the coast to the Gulf of Mexico to the Yucatán. They can be found along the Caribbean Central and South America's coast from Mexico to Rio de Janeiro. They are not found in the West Indies.

== Etymology ==
Astroscopus is Latin for one who aims at the stars.
