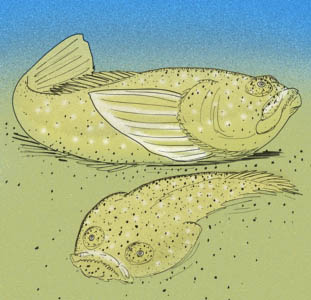
- Artist's reconstruction

Scientific classification
- Kingdom: Animalia
- Phylum: Chordata
- Class: Actinopterygii
- Order: Labriformes
- Family: Uranoscopidae
- Genus: Astroscopus
- Species: †A. countermani

Binomial name
- †Astroscopus countermani Carnevale, Godfrey & Pietsch, 2011

= Astroscopus countermani =

Astroscopus countermani Temporal range: Tortonian

Extinct species of ray-finned fish

Astroscopus countermani is an extinct species of stargazer described from a cranium found in Tortonian deposits of the Calvert Cliffs of what is now Maryland. A. countermani is very similar to its living relatives.
