= Uranoscopus brunneus =

Scientific classification
- Kingdom: Animalia
- Phylum: Chordata
- Class: Actinopterygii
- Order: Labriformes
- Family: Uranoscopidae
- Genus: Uranoscopus
- Species: U. brunneus

Binomial name
- Uranoscopus brunneus R. Fricke, 2018

Species of fish

Uranoscopus brunneus, the dark-finned stargazer, is a member of the group Uranoscopidae, the benthic living fishes distributed worldwide in tropical and temperate oceans.

== Description ==
The stargazers are from the perciform fish family called Uranoscopidae. They are a group of benthic living fishes distributed worldwide in tropical and temperate oceans, however, few species occasionally enter brackish waters or even fresh water habitats. They bury in sand or mud, leaving only the eyes and anterodorsal part of their head exposed. Members of the stargazers are characterised by having dorsally or dorsolaterally directed eyes placed on or near the top of their large, flattened, cuboid head. They are commonly called stargazers because these small eyes turn upwards 'looking at the stars'. They have oblique to vertical mouth, with lips usually lined with cutaneous cirri. Their body is elongated and sub-compressed. In the family Uranoscopidae, seven genera and 53 valid species are known. The genus comprises a total of 25 valid species of which the last two were discovered in 2018.

Uranoscopus brunneus is a member of a species group which is characterised by a supracleithrum with a sharp spine at rear end and one or more spines inside. Hence, the dorsoposterior margin of the pectoral fin is distinctly concave (forming an angle of about 30–40° between upper edge and middle ray).

Uranoscopus brunneus exclusively possesses within the group:

- 12 anal-fin rays (other species 13–14),
- 62 oblique scale rows along the sides of the body (other species 47–59),
- 8 spines on the lower margin of the preopercle (other species 3–6),
- and dark brown pectoral-fin membranes (other species: pale to light brown).

== Distribution and habitat ==
The genus Uranoscopus is distributed in the Indo-West Pacific, the eastern Atlantic, and the Mediterranean and Black Sea. Uranoscopus brunneus can be found in Papua New Guinea (New Britain), Philippines, and Indonesia.

The species can be found on soft bottoms of lower continental shelf; known depth range 315−625 m.

== Etymology ==
"Brunneus" (Latin) means brown; the name refers to the overall brown color of the species, and especially to its brown pectoral fin membranes. Uranoscopus is from the Greek, ouranos, "sky" and skopein, "to watch".

== Life cycle ==
The stargazer lays small, transparent eggs. These eggs float to the surface after they are released. They hatch into larvae and grow up to 6–7 mm (0.24–0.28 in). After this they swim to the bottom and grow into adults.
