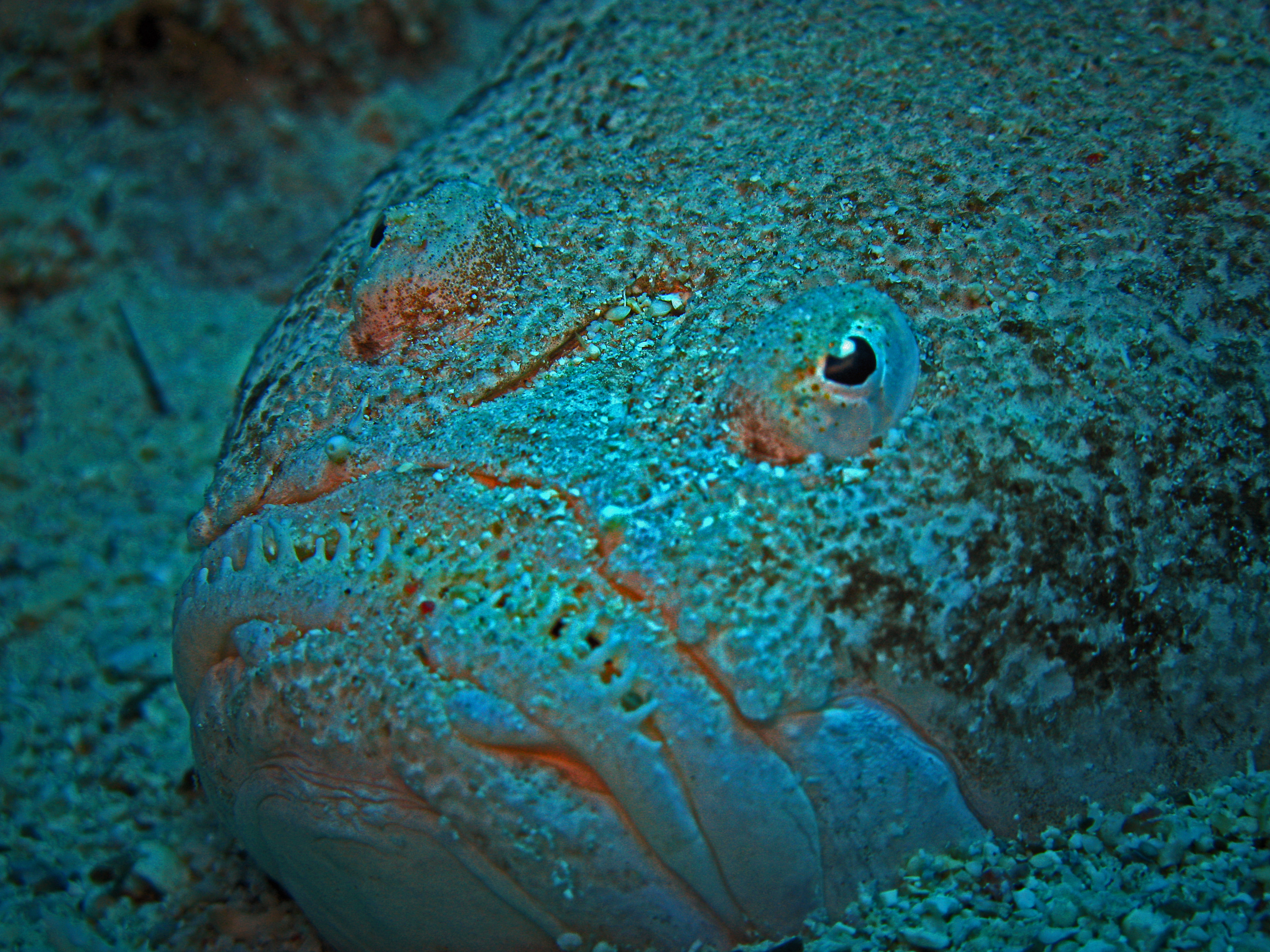

Scientific classification
- Domain: Eukaryota
- Kingdom: Animalia
- Phylum: Chordata
- Class: Actinopterygii
- Order: Labriformes
- Family: Uranoscopidae
- Genus: Uranoscopus
- Species: U. dollfusi

Binomial name
- Uranoscopus dollfusi Brüss, 1986

= Dollfus' stargazer =

Species of fish

Dollfus' stargazer (Uranoscopus dollfusi) is a fish of the family Uranoscopidae, widespread in the Western Indian Ocean: Gulf of Suez, Gulf of Oman, and Persian Gulf. It is a marine demersal fish, and occurs at depths down to about 46 metres (151 ft). It was named in honour of Dr R. P. Dollfus who led an expedition to Egypt in 1928–1929 and who brought back some specimens of this fish which he mistakenly identified as Uranoscopus affinis. These were new to science and became the type specimens of the new species U. dollfusi, with the Gulf of Suez being the type locality.

== Description ==
Dollfus' stargazer grows to a maximum length of about 23.7 cm (9.3 in). The body is somewhat elongate and tapers towards the tail. The head is bony and somewhat flattened, with and eyes set near the top and an upturned mouth, fringed with papillae. A ribbon-like tentacle projects from inside the lower jaw. There is a large, upward-pointing venomous humeral spine, further spines above the wide gill openings and three downward-pointing blunt spines in front of the eye. The dorsal fin is divided into two parts and has four spines and twelve to fourteen soft rays. The anal fin has thirteen to fourteen soft rays and the caudal fin is slightly rounded. The lateral line is high on the body and there are no scales on the head, nape or abdomen apart from a few embedded ones above the front of the lateral line. The colour of this fish is greyish-brown with paler underparts. There are reddish bony ridges on the head and the spinous dorsal fin is black with a white base. The caudal fin has a white margin.

== Biology ==
Dollfus' stargazer is an ambush predator. It lies on the seabed submerged in the sediment with just its eyes and fringed mouth projecting. The tentacle on its lower jaw can be waved around to act as a lure, and it then snaps at any small fish that come close enough.
