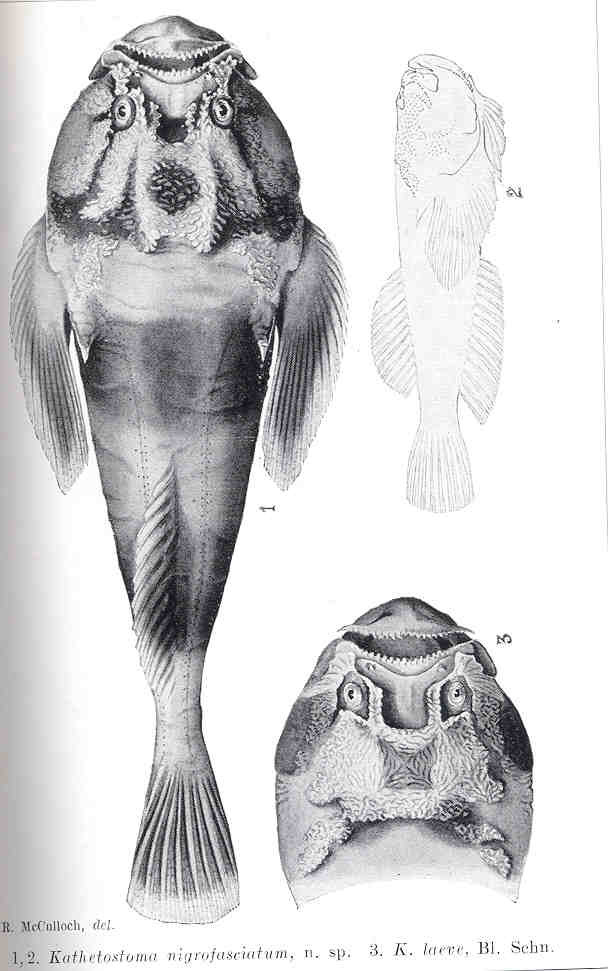
- Sketch of Kathetostoma nigrofasciatum from Fishes of the South Australian Government Trawling Cruise, 1914

Scientific classification
- Kingdom: Animalia
- Phylum: Chordata
- Class: Actinopterygii
- Order: Labriformes
- Family: Uranoscopidae
- Genus: Kathetostoma
- Species: K. nigrofasciatum

Binomial name
- Kathetostoma nigrofasciatum Waite & McCulloch, 1915

= Deepwater stargazer =

Species of ray-finned fish

The deepwater stargazer (Kathetostoma nigrofasciatum) is a ray-finned fish species in the stargazer family, described in 1915. It is native to the Eastern Indian Ocean.
