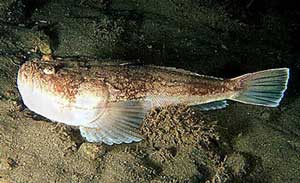
- Uranoscopus scaber - type species of the genus

Scientific classification
- Kingdom: Animalia
- Phylum: Chordata
- Class: Actinopterygii
- Order: Labriformes
- Family: Uranoscopidae
- Genus: Uranoscopus; Linnaeus, 1758

Type species
- Uranoscopus scaber Linnaeus, 1758

Synonyms
- Nematagnus Gill, 1861; Zalescopus Jordan & Hubbs, 1925

= Uranoscopus =

Genus of ray-finned fishes

Uranoscopus is a genus of stargazer fish from the family Uranoscopidae. The genus name Uranoscopus is from Ancient Greek οὐρανός (ouranós), meaning "sky, heaven", and σκοπέω (skopéō), meaning "to look".

== Species ==
There are 25 species in the genus:

- Uranoscopus affinis Cuvier, 1829
- Uranoscopus albesca Regan, 1915 - Longspine stargazer
- Uranoscopus arafurensis Prokofiev, 2020
- Uranoscopus archionema Regan, 1921
- Uranoscopus bauchotae Brüss, 1987
- Uranoscopus brunneus R. Fricke, 2018
- Uranoscopus bicinctus Temminck & Schlegel, 1843 - Marbled stargazer
- Uranoscopus cadenati Poll, 1959 - West African stargazer
- Uranoscopus chinensis Guichenot, 1882
- Uranoscopus cognatus Cantor, 1849 - Two-spined yellow-tail stargazer
- Uranoscopus crassiceps Alcock, 1890
- Uranoscopus dahlakensis Brüss, 1987
- Uranoscopus dollfusi Brüss, 1987 - Dollfus' stargazer
- Uranoscopus filibarbis Cuvier, 1829
- Uranoscopus fuscomaculatus Kner, 1868
- Uranoscopus guttatus Cuvier, 1829 - Dollfus' stargrazer
- Uranoscopus japonicus Houttuyn, 1782
- Uranoscopus kaianus Günther, 1880 - Kai stargazer
- Uranoscopus marisrubri Brüss, 1987
- Uranoscopus marmoratus Cuvier, 1829
- Uranoscopus oligolepis Bleeker, 1878
- Uranoscopus polli Cadenat, 1951 - Whitespotted stargazer
- Uranoscopus rosette Randall & Arnold, 2012
- Uranoscopus scaber Linnaeus, 1758 - Atlantic stargazer
- Uranoscopus sulphureus Valenciennes, 1832 - Whitemargin stargazer
- Uranoscopus tosae (Jordan & Hubbs, 1925)
