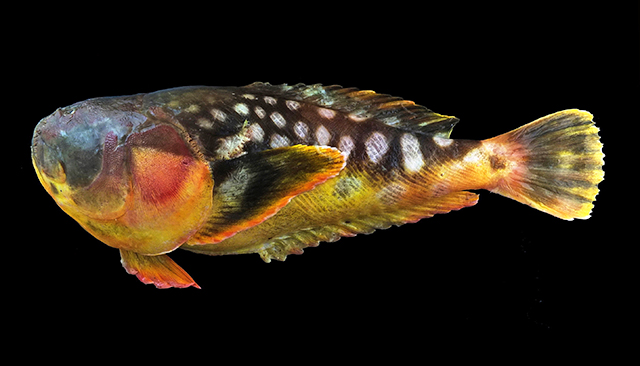
- Ichthyscopus lebeck

Scientific classification
- Kingdom: Animalia
- Phylum: Chordata
- Class: Actinopterygii
- Order: Labriformes
- Family: Uranoscopidae
- Genus: Ichthyscopus; Swainson, 1839

Type species
- Uranoscopus inermis Cuvier 1829

Synonyms
- Anema Günther, 1860

= Ichthyscopus =

Genus of ray-finned fishes

Ichthyscopus is a genus of stargazers from the family Uranoscopidae. They are ambush predators from the western Indo-Pacific region.

== Species ==
The following species are classified as members of the genus Ichthyscopus:

- Ichthyscopus barbatus Mees, 1960
- Ichthyscopus fasciatus Haysom, 1957
- Ichthyscopus insperatus Mees, 1960
- Ichthyscopus lebeck (Bloch & Schneider, 1801)
- Ichthyscopus malacopterus (Anonymous [Bennett], 1830)
- Ichthyscopus nigripinnis Gomon & Johnson, 1999
- Ichthyscopus sannio Whitley, 1936
- Ichthyscopus spinosus Mees, 1960
