= Selenoscopus =

Scientific classification
- Kingdom: Animalia
- Phylum: Chordata
- Class: Actinopterygii
- Order: Labriformes
- Family: Uranoscopidae
- Genus: Selenoscopus
- Species: S. turbisquamatus

Binomial name
- Selenoscopus turbisquamatus Okamura & Kishimoto, 1993

Genus of ray-finned fishes

Selenoscopus (from Ancient Greek σελήνη (selḗnē), meaning "moon", and σκοπέω (skopéō), meaning "to look") is a monotypic genus of stargazer from the family Uranoscopidae. The only species in the genus is Selenoscopus turbisquamatus, a bathydemersal species found in the western Pacific Ocean from Japan to the northern Tasman Sea at depths of 100–500 metres (330–1,640 ft).
