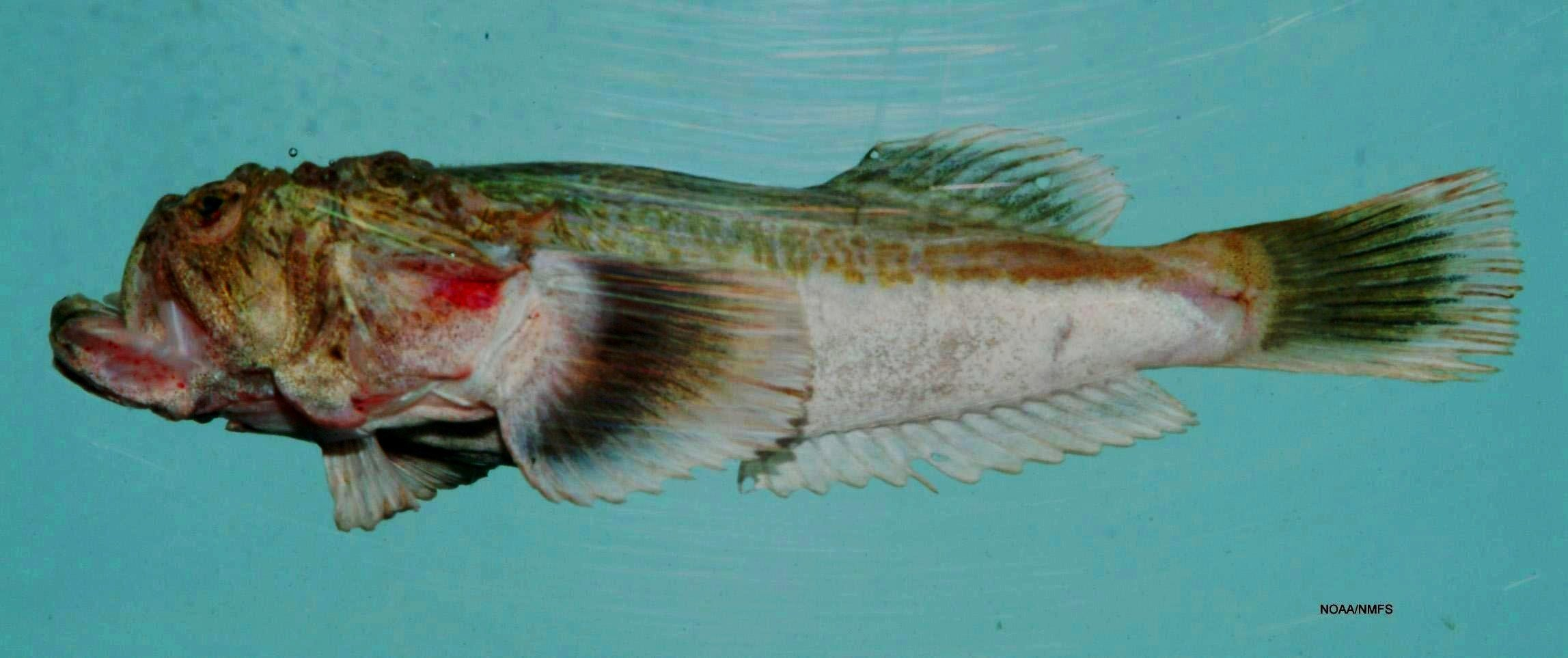
- Xenocephalus egregius

Scientific classification
- Kingdom: Animalia
- Phylum: Chordata
- Class: Actinopterygii
- Order: Labriformes
- Family: Uranoscopidae
- Genus: Xenocephalus; Kaup, 1858

Type species
- Xenocephalus armatus Kaup, 1858

Synonyms
- Ariscopus Jordan & Snyder, 1902; Execestides Jordan & Thompson, 1905; Gnathagnus Gill, 1861; Gnathagnoides Whitley] & Phillipps, 1939; Benthoscopus Longley & Hildebrand, 1940

= Xenocephalus =

Genus of ray-finned fishes

Xenocephalus is a genus of ray-finned fish from the family Uranoscopidae, the stargazers. They are found in the Indo-Pacific region and are benthic, ambush predators.

== Species ==
The following species are classified within Xenocephalus:

- Xenocephalus armatus Kaup, 1858
- Xenocephalus australiensis (Kishimoto, 1989)
- Xenocephalus cribratus (Kishimoto, 1989)
- Xenocephalus egregious (Jordan & Thompson, 1905)
- Xenocephalus elongatus (Temminck & Schlegel, 1843)
- Xenocephalus innotabilis (Waite, 1904)
