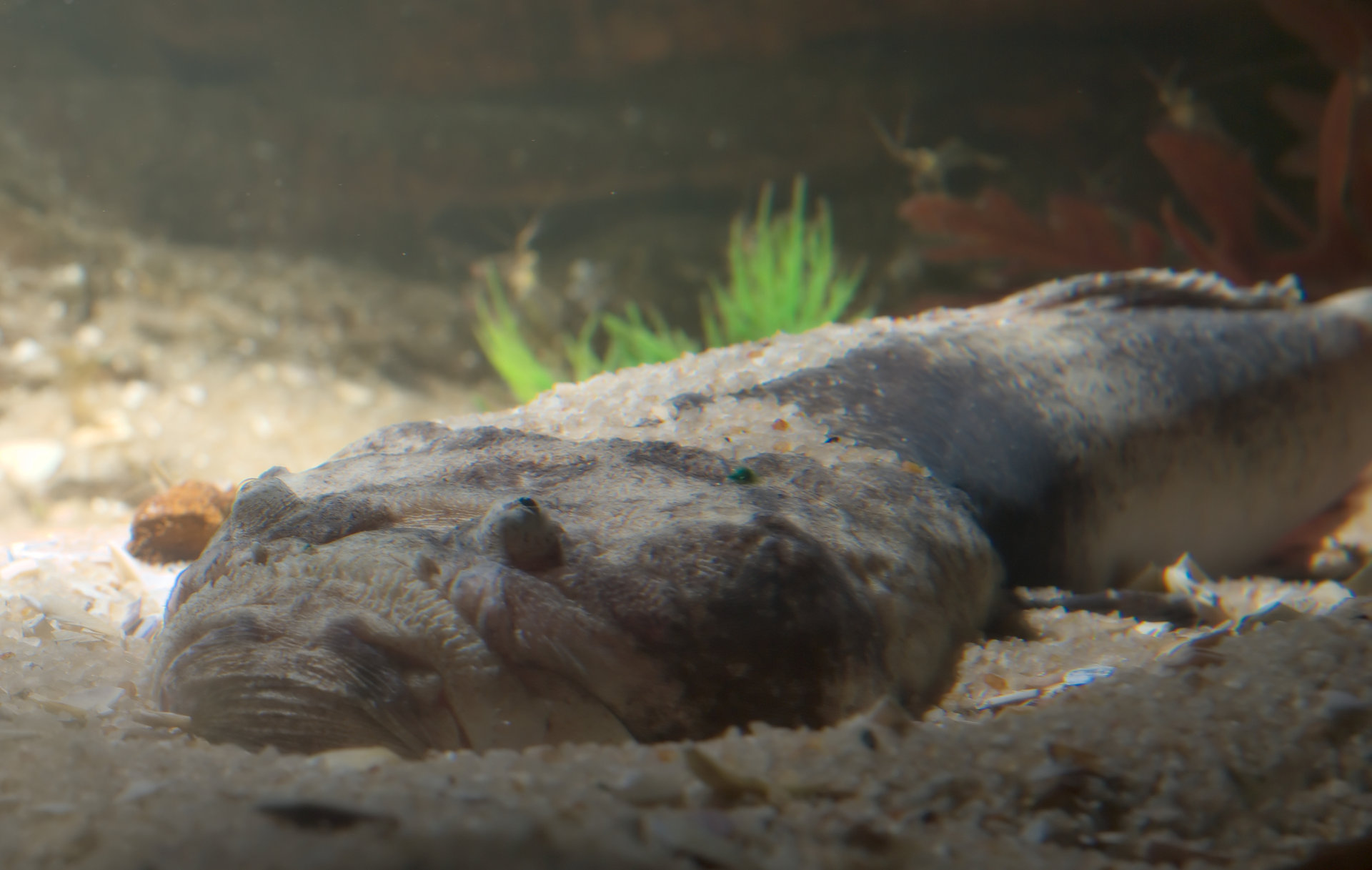
- Kathetostoma laeve

Scientific classification
- Kingdom: Animalia
- Phylum: Chordata
- Class: Actinopterygii
- Order: Labriformes
- Family: Uranoscopidae
- Genus: Kathetostoma; Günther, 1860

Type species
- Uranoscopus laevis Bloch & Schneider, 1801

= Kathetostoma =

Genus of fishes

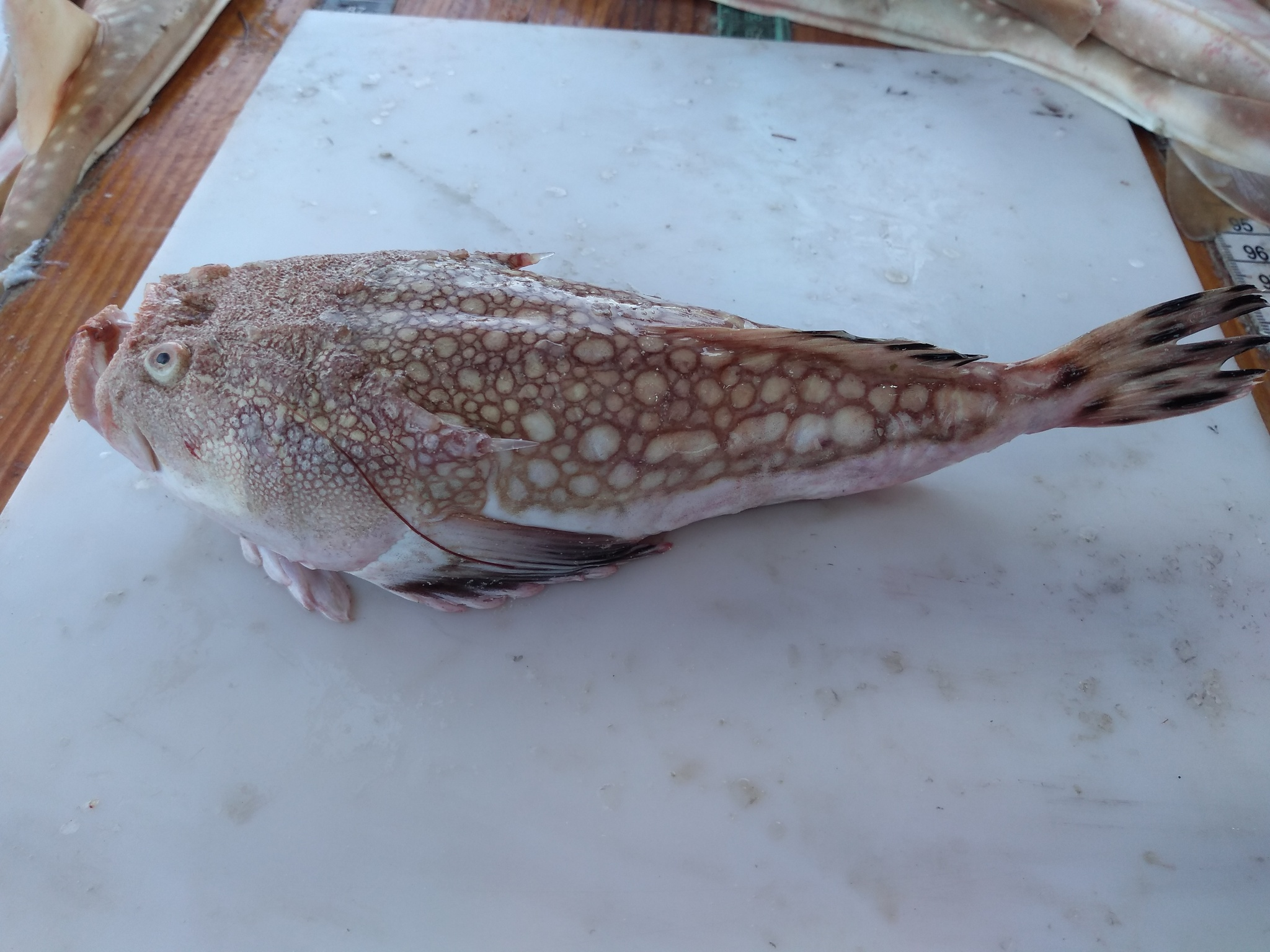
Lancer stargazer (K. albigutta)

Kathetostoma is a genus of bony fish from the family Uranoscopidae, the stargazers. They are demersal predators which are found in the western Atlantic, Pacific and Indian Oceans, with most species around Australia and New Zealand.

== Characteristics ==
They have a naked body with a head which has a quadrilateral cross section with the eyes directed upward. These have a small, bony orbital rim and are separated by a scaleless rectangular space. The mouth is armed with a number of large canines which sit among smaller canines. The chin is smoothly curved and the lips have short ridge-like crenulations. There are four spines on the ventral margin of preopercle and the anterior end of isthmus has two obvious forward pointing spines. There is a prominent spine on the cleithrum which is sheathed in skin and is located above the base of the pectoral fin base. The lateral line consists of pores in the skin placed high on side near the base of the dorsal fin. The dorsal fin is continuous and has 13–18 segmented rays, the anal fin has 12–18 segmented rays and the pectoral fins are very large and semi-circular while the pelvic fins are moderately large. This is a harmless species to humans and has a flattish head.

== Species ==
The following species are classified within Kathetostoma:

- Kathetostoma albigutta (Bean, 1892) - Lancer stargazer
- Kathetostoma averruncus Jordan & Bollman, 1890 - Smooth stargazer,
- Kathetostoma binigrasella Gomon & Roberts, 2011 - Banded stargazer
- Kathetostoma canaster Gomon & Last, 1987
- Kathetostoma cubana Barbour, 1941 Spiny stargazer,
- Kathetostoma fluviatilis Hutton, 1872 River stargazer
- Kathetostoma giganteum Haast, 1873 Giant stargazer
- Kathetostoma laeve (Bloch & Schneider, 1801) Common stargazer,
- Kathetostoma nigrofasciatum Waite & McCulloch, 1915 Deepwater stargazer,
