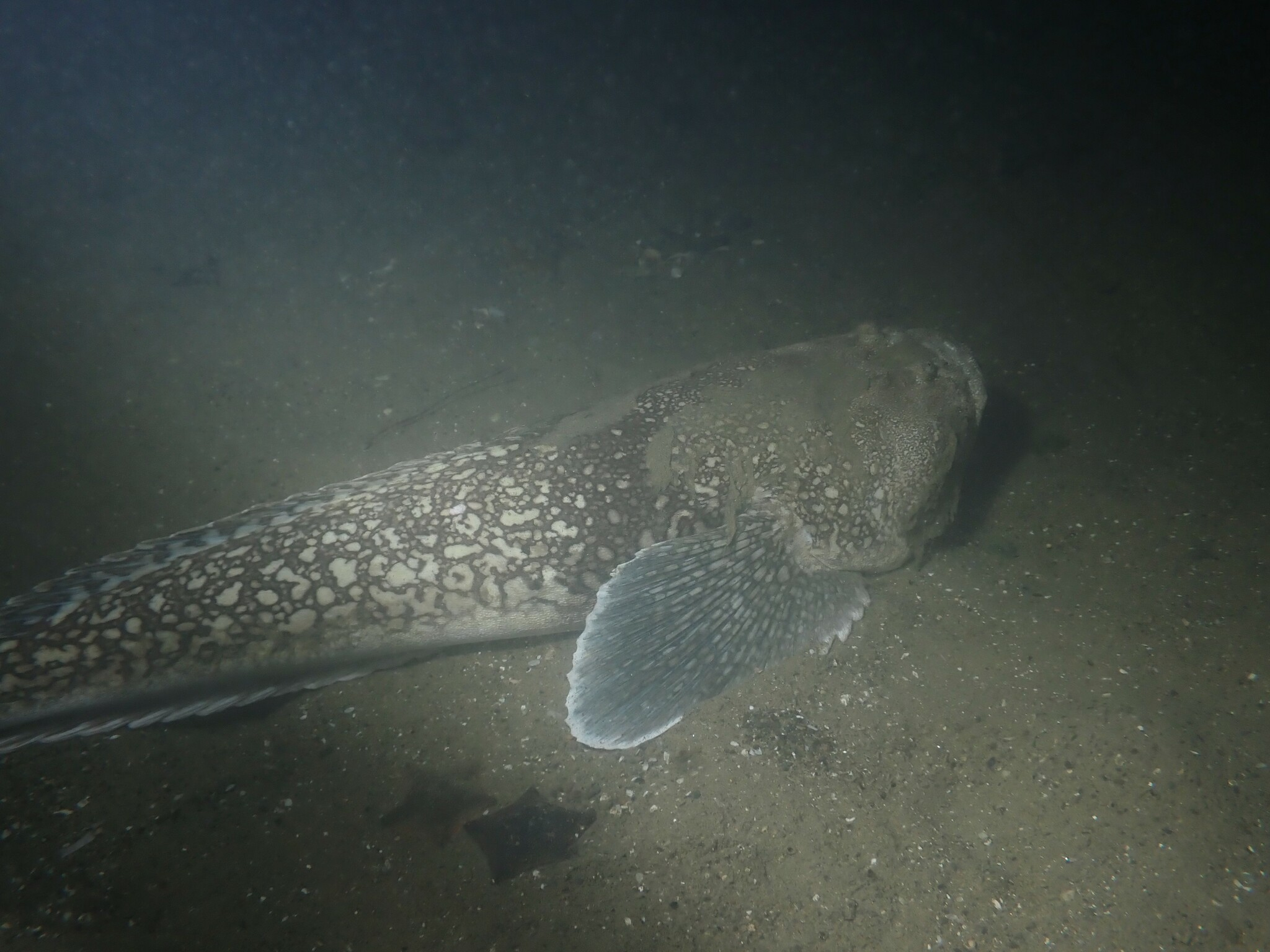

Conservation status
- Least Concern (IUCN 3.1)

Scientific classification
- Kingdom: Animalia
- Phylum: Chordata
- Class: Actinopterygii
- Order: Labriformes
- Family: Uranoscopidae
- Genus: Genyagnus; Gill, 1861
- Species: G. monopterygius

Binomial name
- Genyagnus monopterygius (Schneider, 1801)

Synonyms
- Uranoscopus monopterygius Schneider, 1801

= Spotted stargazer =

Species of ray-finned fish

The spotted stargazer (Genyagnus monopterygius) is a stargazer of the family Uranoscopidae, found on the continental shelf around New Zealand and other southern Pacific islands, at depths down to 100 metres (330 ft). It is known to grow up to 45 centimetres (18 in) in length.

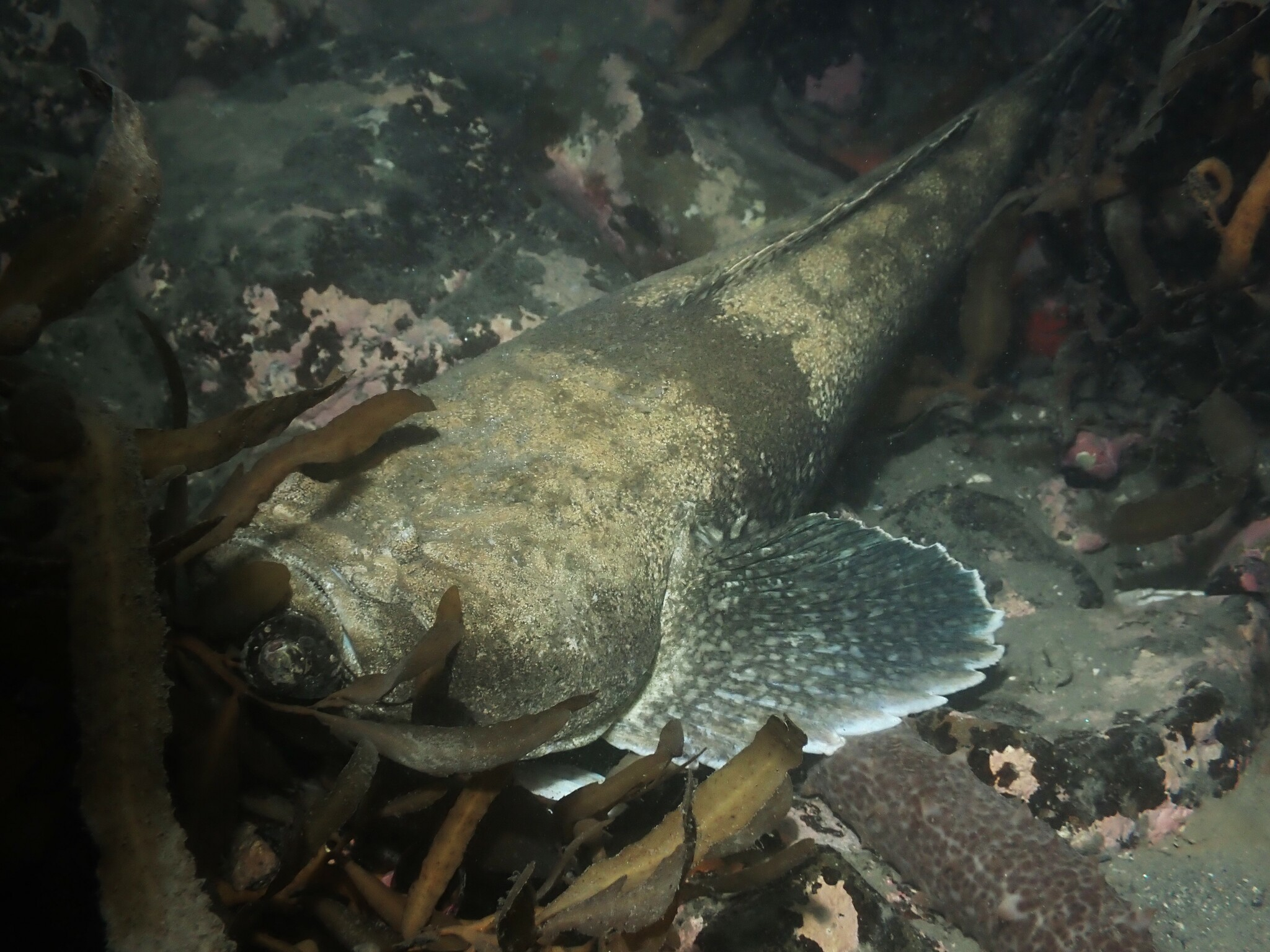
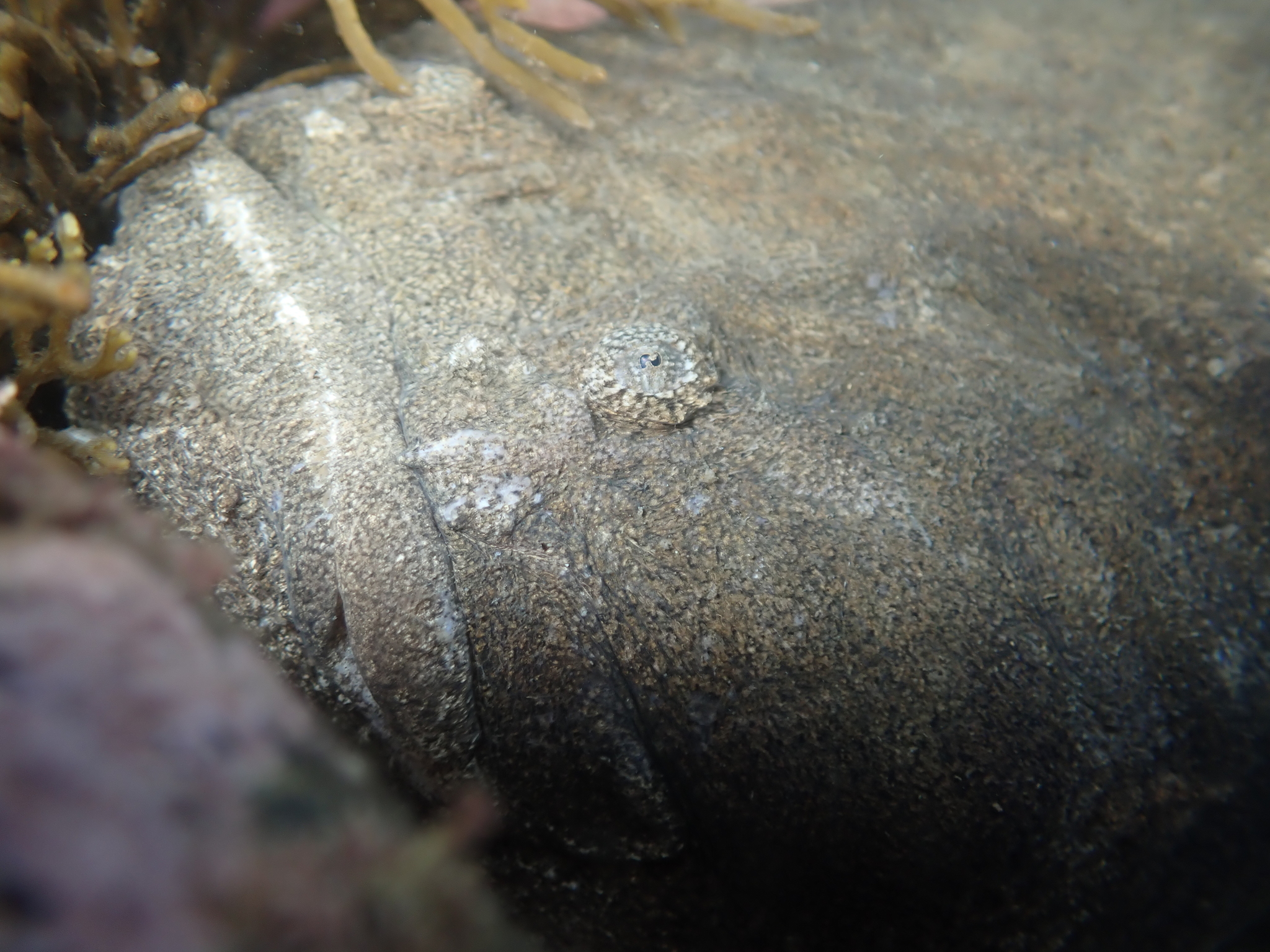
