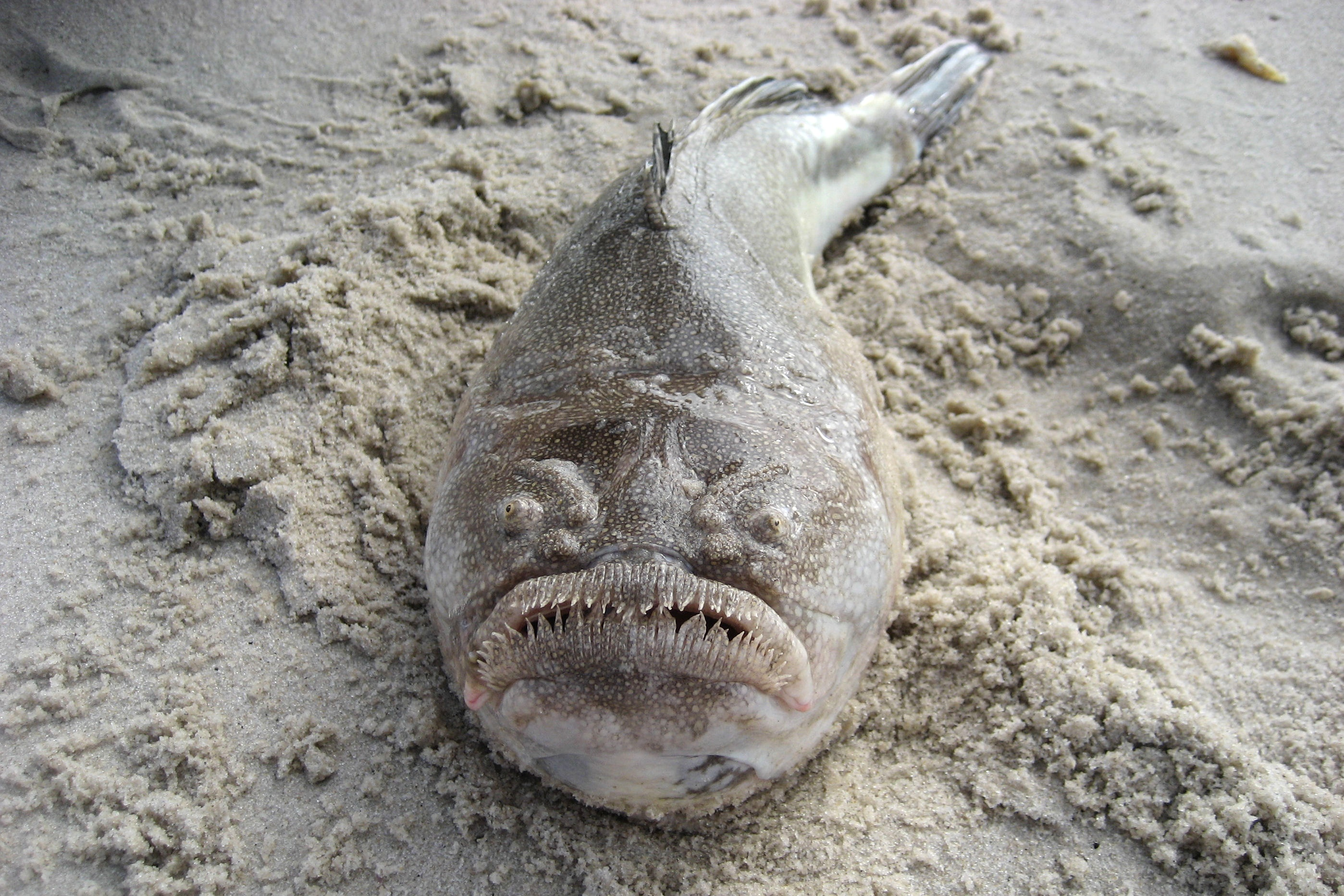
- Northern stargazer (A. guttatus)

Scientific classification
- Kingdom: Animalia
- Phylum: Chordata
- Class: Actinopterygii
- Order: Labriformes
- Family: Uranoscopidae
- Genus: Astroscopus; Brevoort, 1860

Type species
- Uranoscopus anoplos Valenciennes, 1832

Synonyms
- Agnus Günther, 1860; Upselonphorus Gill, 1861

= Astroscopus =

Astroscopus Temporal range: Late Miocene to present

Genus of ray-finned fishes

Astroscopus (from Ancient Greek ἀστήρ (astḗr), meaning "star", and σκοπέω (skopéō), meaning "to look"), the electric stargazers, is a genus of stargazers, a type of percomorph fish from the family Uranoscopidae, part of the order Labriformes. The species in this genus are anatomically distinct uranoscopids, being characterized by internal nares and being the only group of marine bony fish having organs which produce electricity which are derived from the extraocular muscles. They are found on the Atlantic and Pacific coasts of the Americas.

== Species ==
There are four extant and one extinct species included in Astroscopus:

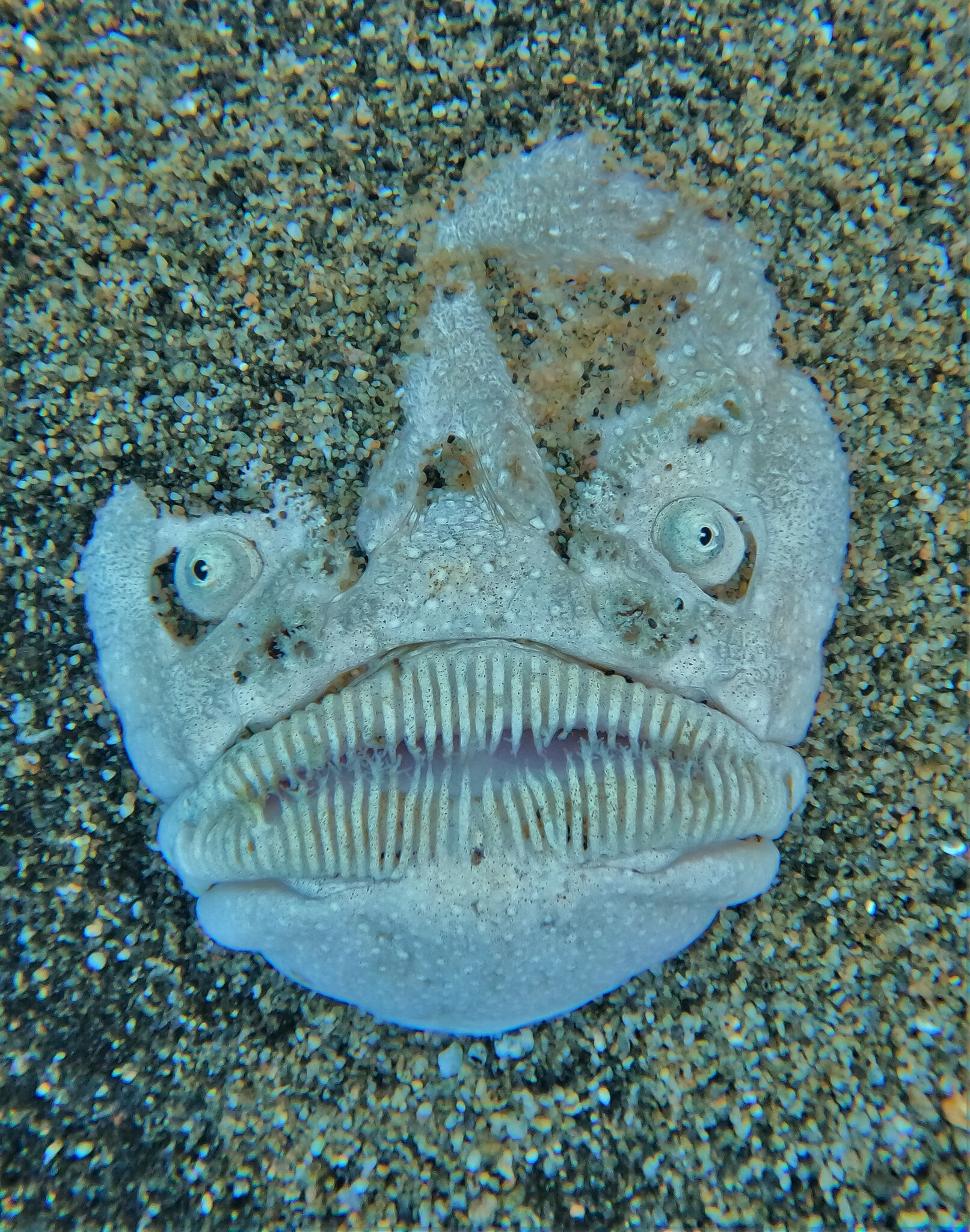
Pacific stargazer (A. zephyreus)

- Astroscopus guttatus Abbott, 1860 - Northern stargazer
- Astroscopus sexspinosus (Steindachner, 1876) - Brazilian Stargazer
- Astroscopus y-graecum, (Cuvier, 1829) - Southern stargazer
- Astroscopus zephyreus Gilbert & Starks in Gilbert, 1897
- †Astroscopus countermani Carnevale, Godfrey & Pietsch, 2011 Extinct species described from the Tortonian deposits of Calvert Cliffs, Maryland.
