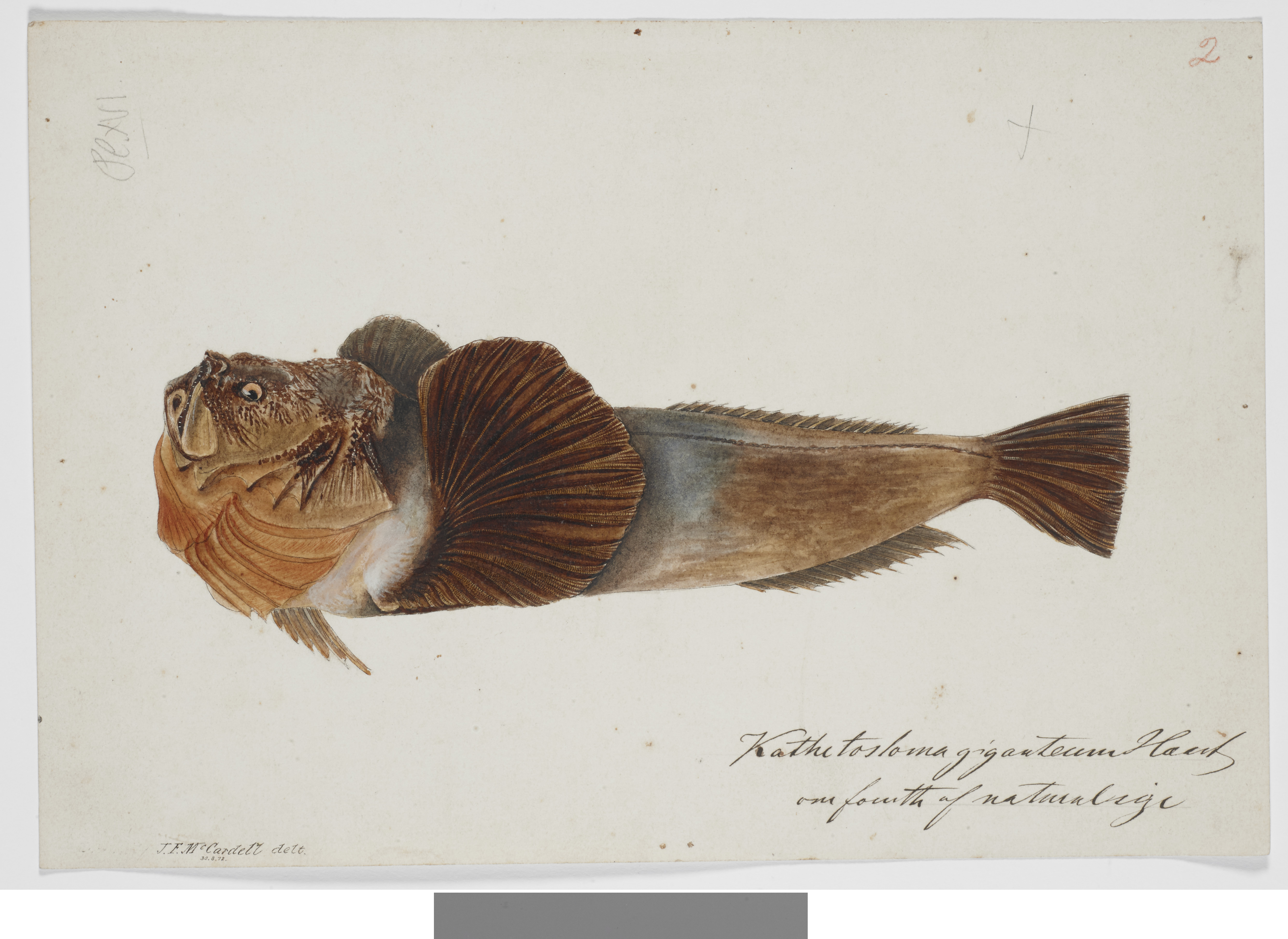

Scientific classification
- Kingdom: Animalia
- Phylum: Chordata
- Class: Actinopterygii
- Order: Labriformes
- Family: Uranoscopidae
- Genus: Kathetostoma
- Species: K. giganteum

Binomial name
- Kathetostoma giganteum Haast, 1873

= Giant stargazer =

Species of ray-finned fish

The giant stargazer (Kathetostoma giganteum) is a stargazer of the family Uranoscopidae, found on the continental shelf around New Zealand and endemic to that area.

It is commonly called monkfish, but this should not be confused with the Northern Hemisphere monkfish which is an entirely different genus of fish, Lophius, in another order, Lophiiformes.

== Names ==
In English, Kathetostoma giganteum is commonly known as the giant stargazer or the monkfish. In the indigenous Māori language, the fish is referred to as kourepoua, moamoa or pūwhara.
