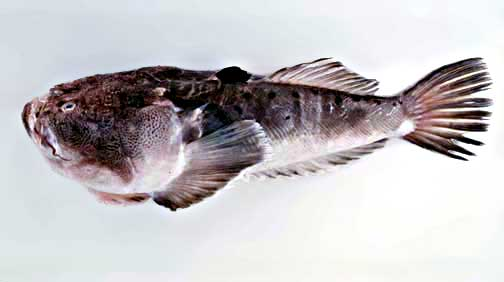

Scientific classification
- Domain: Eukaryota
- Kingdom: Animalia
- Phylum: Chordata
- Class: Actinopterygii
- Order: Labriformes
- Family: Uranoscopidae
- Genus: Uranoscopus
- Species: U. sulphureus

Binomial name
- Uranoscopus sulphureus Valenciennes, 1832

= Whitemargin stargazer =

Species of ray-finned fish

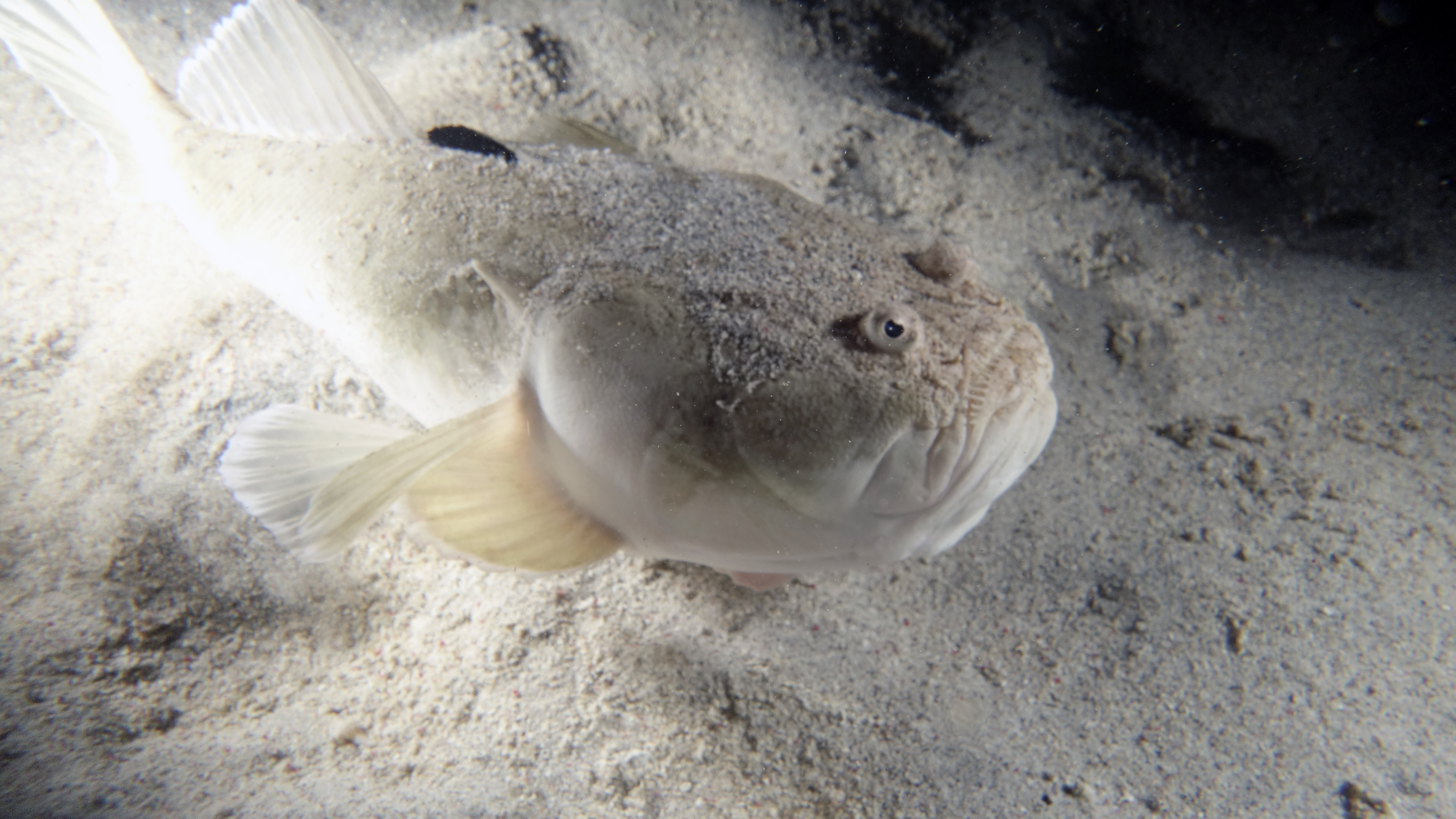
Swimming Whitemargin Stargazer off Komodo Island

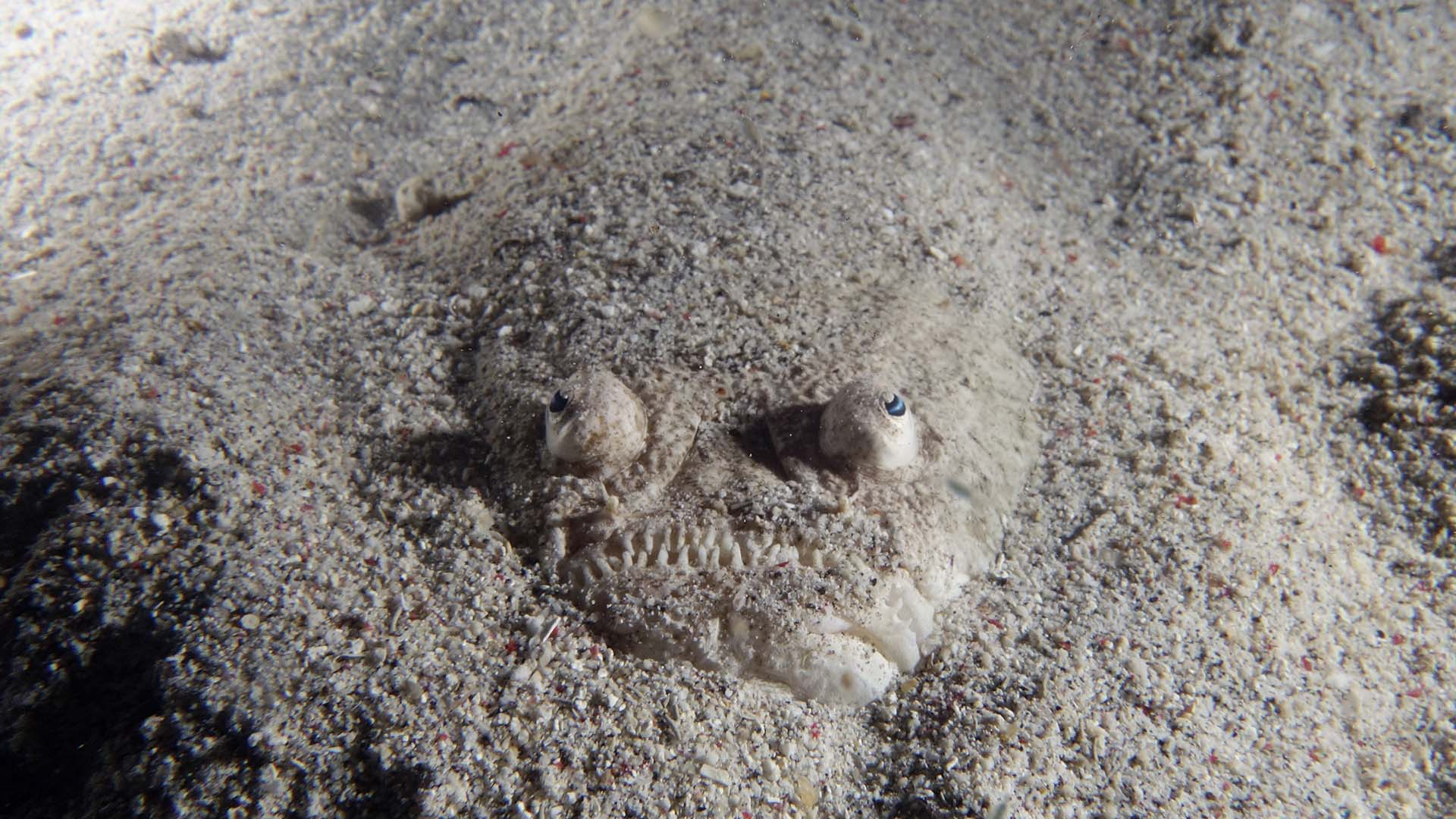
Whitemargin Stargazer in sand off Komodo Island

Whitemargin stargazer (Uranoscopus sulphureus) is a ray-finned fish of the family Uranoscopidae, widespread in the Indopacific: Red Sea, Indonesia, Fiji, Samoa, and Tonga. Marine reef-associated fish, up to 45.0 cm maximal length.
