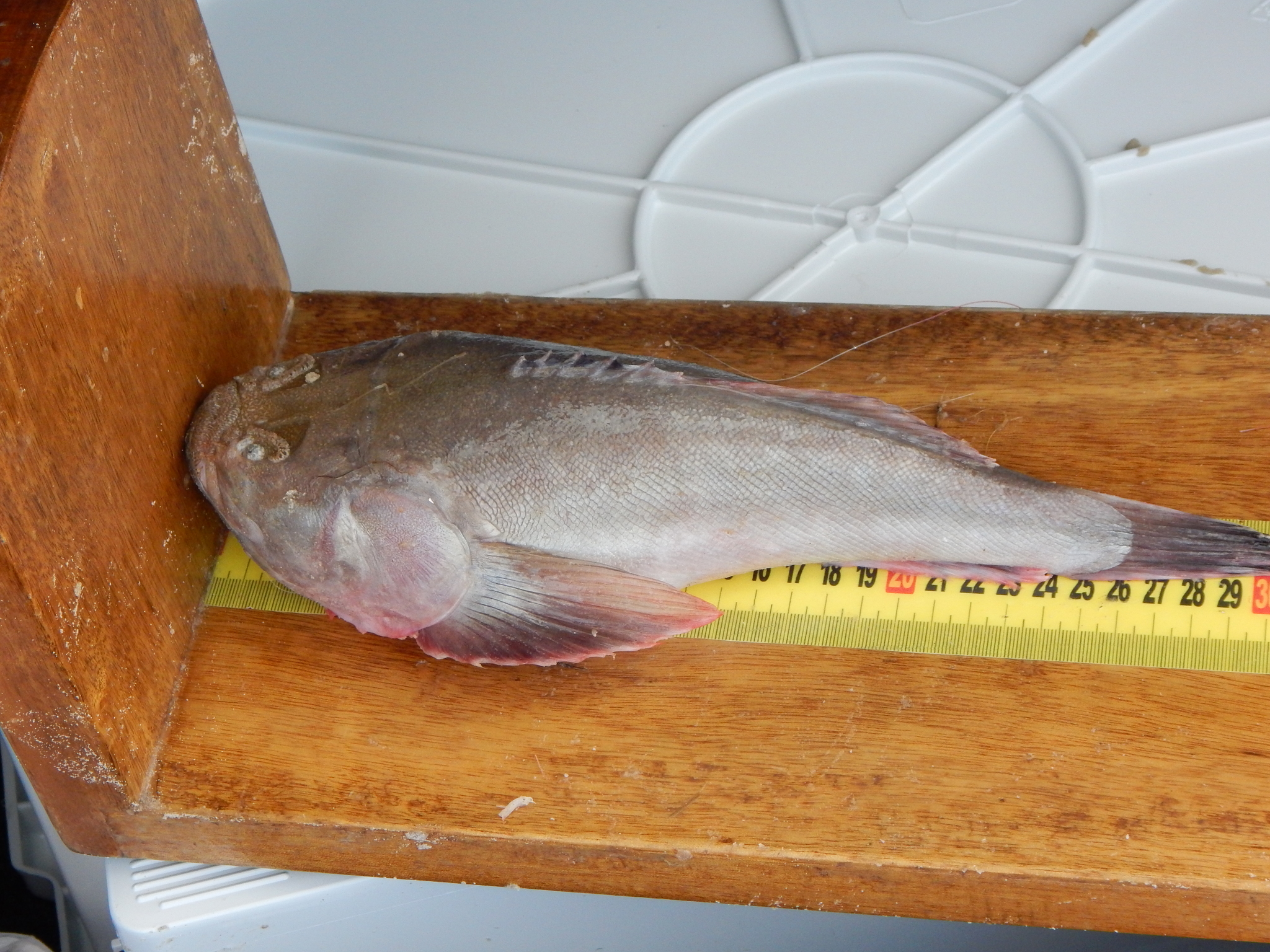

Conservation status
- Least Concern (IUCN 3.1)

Scientific classification
- Kingdom: Animalia
- Phylum: Chordata
- Class: Actinopterygii
- Order: Labriformes
- Family: Uranoscopidae
- Genus: Astroscopus
- Species: A. sexspinosus

Binomial name
- Astroscopus sexspinosus (Steindachner, 1876)

Synonyms
- Uranoscopus sexspinosus Steindachner, 1876

= Astroscopus sexspinosus =

Brazilian Stargazer

Species of ray-finned fish

Astroscopus sexspinosus, the Brazilian stargazer, is a species of electric stargazer (Astroscopus) found off the coast of southern Brazil and northern Argentina. The Brazilian stargazer can be found to depths of 49 feet (15m).
