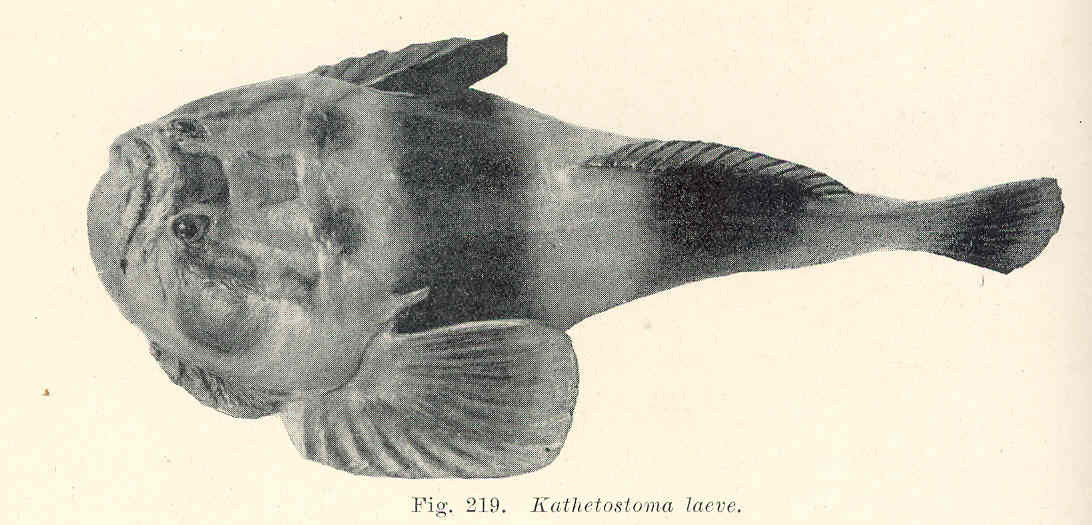
- Common stargazer, Kathetostoma laeve

Scientific classification
- Kingdom: Animalia
- Phylum: Chordata
- Class: Actinopterygii
- Division: Teleostei
- Order: Labriformes
- Suborder: Uranoscopoidei
- Family: Uranoscopidae; Jordan & Evermann, 1898

Genera
- See text

= Stargazer (fish) =

Family of ray-finned fishes

The stargazers are a family, Uranoscopidae (from Ancient Greek οὐρανός (ouranós), meaning "sky, heaven", and σκοπέω (skopéō), meaning "to look"), of perciform, ray-finned fish that have eyes on top of their heads (hence the name). The family includes about 51 species (one extinct) in eight genera, all marine and found worldwide in shallow and deep saltwaters.

== Description ==
In addition to the top-mounted eyes, stargazers also have large, upward-facing mouths in their large heads. Their usual habit is to bury themselves in sand, and leap upwards to ambush prey (benthic fish and invertebrates) that pass overhead. Some species have a worm-shaped lure growing out of the floors of their mouths, which they can wiggle to attract prey's attention. Both the dorsal and anal fins are relatively long; some lack dorsal spines. Lengths range from 18 to 90 cm, for the giant stargazer Kathetostoma giganteum.

Stargazers are venomous; they have two, large, venomous spines situated behind their opercles and above their pectoral fins. The species within the genera Astroscopus and Uranoscopus can also cause electric shocks. Astroscopus species have a single electric organ consisting of modified eye muscles, while Uranoscopus species have theirs derived from sonic muscles. These two genera within stargazers represent one of eight independent evolutions of bioelectrogenesis. They are unique among electric fish in not possessing electroreceptors, meaning that they do not use an electric sense to locate prey.

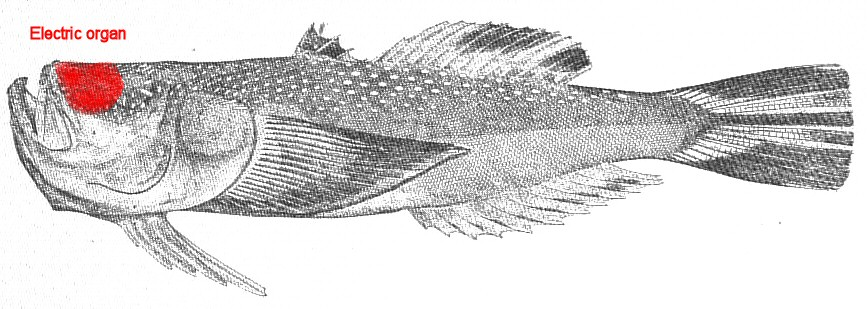
Stargazer's paired electric organs are aligned vertically inside the head, behind the eyes.

Stargazers are a delicacy in some cultures (the venom is not poisonous when eaten), and they can be found for sale in some fish markets with the electric organ removed. As ambush predators, they camouflage themselves; some can deliver both venom and electric shocks. Ichthyologist William Leo Smith called them "the meanest things in creation".

== Genera ==
The Uranscopidae contain these genera:

- Astroscopus Brevoort, 1860
- Genyagnus Gill, 1861
- Ichthyscopus Swainson, 1839
- Kathetostoma Günther, 1860
- Pleuroscopus Barnard, 1927
- Selenoscopus Okamura & Kishimoto, 1993
- Uranoscopus Linnaeus, 1758
- Xenocephalus Kaup, 1858
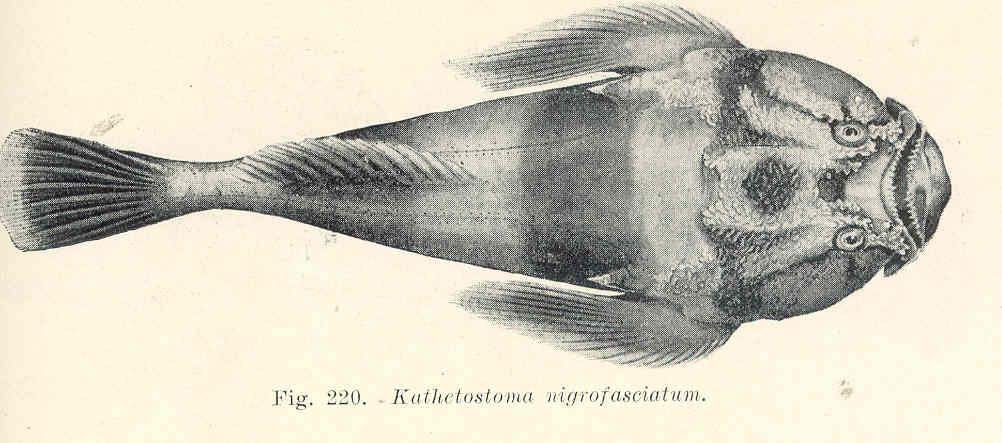
Deepwater stargazer
(Kathetostoma nigrofasciatum)

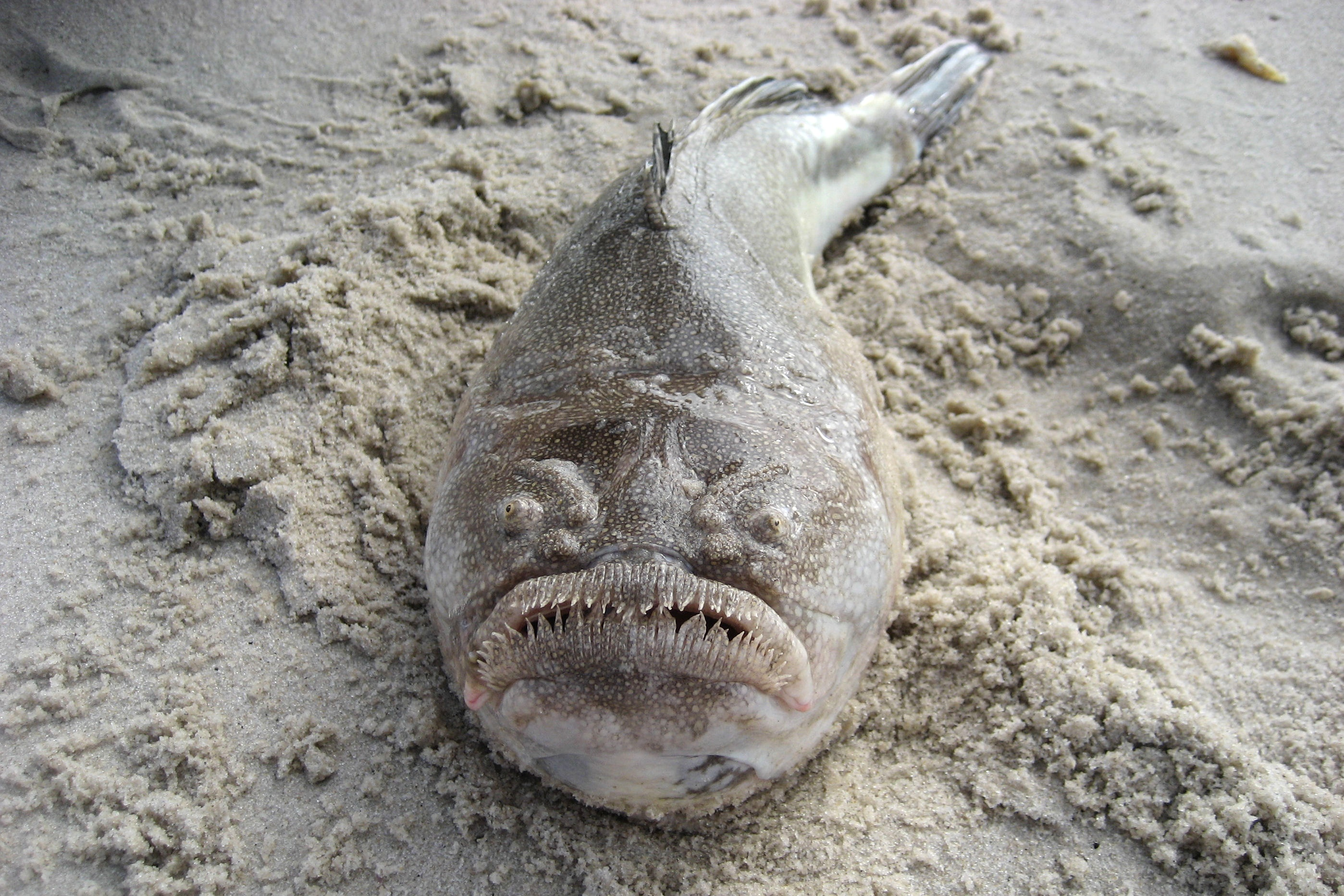
Northern stargazer
(Astroscopus guttatus)

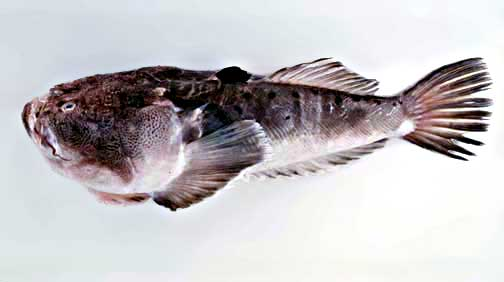
Whitemargin stargazer
(Uranoscopus sulphureus)

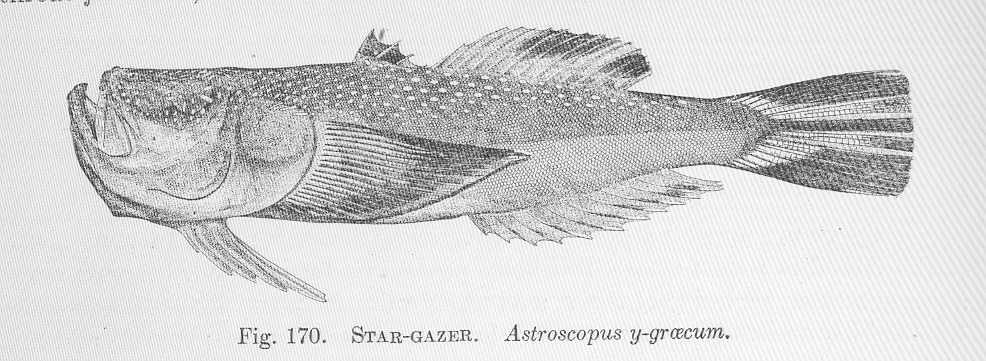
Southern stargazer
(Astroscopus y-graecum)
