= Dual oxidase 1 =

Protein-coding gene in the species Homo sapiens

DUOX1

Identifiers
- Aliases: DUOX1, LNOX1, NOXEF1, THOX1, dual oxidase 1
- External IDs: OMIM: 606758; MGI: 2139422; GeneCards: DUOX1
Enzyme activity
EC #	BRENDA	ExPASy	KEGG	MetaCyc
1.6.3.1	↗	↗	↗	↗

Gene location (Human)
Chr.	Chromosome 15 (human)
Band	15q21.1	Start	45,129,933 bp
Band	15q21.1	End	45,165,576 bp

Gene location (Mouse)
Chr.	Chromosome 2 (mouse)
Band	2|2 E5	Start	122,146,153 bp
Band	2|2 E5	End	122,178,453 bp
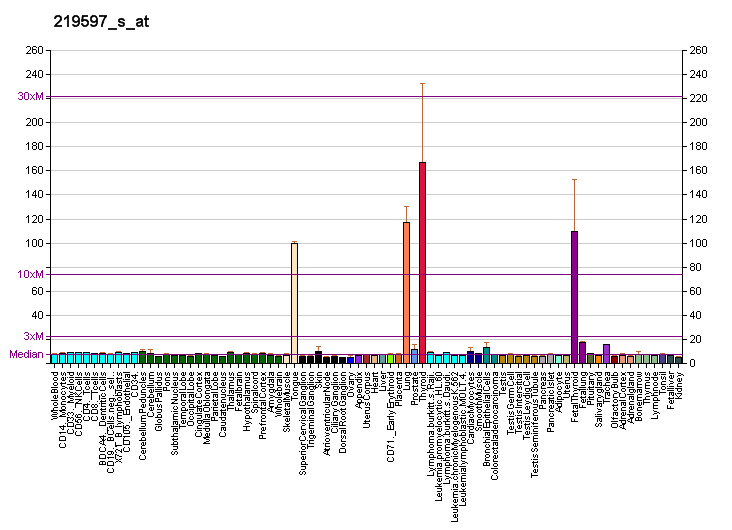
RNA expression pattern
Bgee	Human / Mouse (ortholog); Top expressed in: right lobe of thyroid gland; left lobe of thyroid gland; right lung; bronchial epithelial cell; gums; gingival epithelium; right uterine tube; skin of abdomen; skin of leg; lower lobe of lung / Top expressed in: esophagus; lip; conjunctival fornix; transitional epithelium of urinary bladder; skin of external ear; knee joint; lumbar subsegment of spinal cord; cornea; embryo; nucleus of stria terminalis; More reference expression data
BioGPS	More reference expression data
Gene ontology
Molecular function	calcium ion binding; peroxidase activity; metal ion binding; heme binding; NADP binding; oxidoreductase activity; NAD(P)H oxidase H2O2-forming activity; protein binding; superoxide-generating NAD(P)H oxidase activity
Cellular component	integral component of membrane; membrane; plasma membrane; apical plasma membrane; endoplasmic reticulum; cell surface; cell leading edge; NADPH oxidase complex
Biological process	cuticle development; cytokine-mediated signaling pathway; cellular oxidant detoxification; response to oxidative stress; reactive oxygen species metabolic process; superoxide anion generation; thyroid hormone generation; hydrogen peroxide catabolic process; hydrogen peroxide biosynthetic process; response to cAMP; hormone biosynthetic process; positive regulation of wound healing; positive regulation of cell motility; defense response
Sources:Amigo / QuickGO
Orthologs
Databases	NCBI: entry; OMA: entry
Species	Human	Mouse
Entrez	53905	99439
Ensembl	ENSG00000137857	ENSMUSG00000033268
UniProt	Q9NRD9	A2AQ92
RefSeq (mRNA)	NM_017434; NM_175940	NM_001099297
RefSeq (protein)	NP_059130; NP_787954	NP_001092767
Location (UCSC)	Chr 15: 45.13 – 45.17 Mb	Chr 2: 122.15 – 122.18 Mb
PubMed search
- Wikidata
View/Edit Human	View/Edit Mouse

Dual oxidase 1, also known as DUOX1 or ThOX1 (for thyroid oxidase), is an enzyme which in humans is encoded by the DUOX1 gene. DUOX1 was first identified in the mammalian thyroid gland. In humans, two isoforms are found; hDUOX1 and hDUOX2. Human DUOX protein localization is not exclusive to thyroid tissue; hDUOX1 is prominent in airway epithelial cells and hDUOX2 in the salivary glands and gastrointestinal tract.

== Function ==
Investigations into reactive oxygen species (ROS) in biological systems have, until recently, focused on characterization of phagocytic cell processes. It is now well accepted that production of such species is not restricted to phagocytic cells and can occur in eukaryotic, non-phagocytic cell types via NADPH oxidase (NOX) or dual oxidase (DUOX). This new family of proteins, termed the NOX/DUOX family or NOX family of NADPH oxidases, consists of homologs to the catalytic moiety of phagocytic NADPH-oxidase, gp91^{phox}. Members of the NOX/DUOX family have been found throughout eukaryotic species, including invertebrates, insects, nematodes, fungi, amoeba, alga, and plants (not found in prokaryotes). These enzymes clearly demonstrate regulated production of ROS as their sole function. Genetic analyses have implicated NOX/DUOX derived ROS in biological roles and pathological conditions including hypertension (NOX1), innate immunity (NOX2/DUOX), otoconia formation in the inner ear (NOX3), and thyroid hormone biosynthesis (DUOX1/2). The family currently has seven members including NOX1, NOX2 (formerly known as gp91^{phox}), NOX3, NOX4, NOX5, DUOX1 (this enzyme) and DUOX2.

The current model for ROS generation by C. elegans DUOX1 (CeDUOX1) proposes that superoxide is generated through reduction of oxygen by two electrons extracted from oxidation of NADPH at the C-terminal NADPH oxidase domain. This unstable superoxide, generated at the extracellular surface, may rapidly convert to hydrogen peroxide and be utilized by the N-terminal peroxidase domain to facilitate tyrosine cross-linking. This model for CeDUOX1 activity was recently supported by a study of two point mutations localized within the peroxidase domain of CeDUOX1; G246D and D392N. Both mutations result in a blistering cuticle phenotype, resulting from the loss of tyrosine cross-linking activity. Neither mutant demonstrates a significant decrease in ROS production. These results suggest this peroxidase-like region is directly involved in enzymatic tyrosine cross-linking, but not responsible for ROS production.

== Structure ==
Dual oxidases are characterized by a defining N-terminal, extracellular domain exhibiting considerable sequence identity with the mammalian peroxidases, a transmembrane (TM) segment appended to an EF-hand calcium-binding cytosolic region and a NOX2 homologous structure (six TMs tethered to NADPH oxidase). Topological studies place this peroxidase domain on the opposite side of the membrane from the NADPH oxidase domain.

hDUOX1 and hDUOX2 are 83% homologous, ~190 kDa in size (after extensive glycosylation contributing ~30 kDa in mass), and require maturation factors (DUOXA1 and DUOXA2) to achieve heterologous expression in full-length, active form. Mature DUOX enzymes produce H_{2}O_{2}; this activity is regulated by Ca^{2+} concentration through triggered dissociation of NOXA1 and possibly other as yet unidentified interacting proteins. When sequence alignments were performed against other mammalian peroxidases, the histidine residues responsible for heme coordination were not conserved. Due to this critical disparity, much speculation has surrounded the function of the DUOX peroxidase domain(s). Proposals for functionality include: superoxide dismutase activity, instead of peroxidase activity; a novel peroxidase mechanism; a protein-protein or Ca^{2+} induced conformational change which subsequently allows heme binding for peroxidase activity; or simply inactivity, as a vestigial domain.

Recent in vitro investigations into the ability of the DUOX1 domain to act as a peroxidase demonstrated that cell lysate from peroxidase expression in C. elegans and E. coli had tyrosine cross-linking activity. Further in vitro studies of human DUOX1 (hDUOX1_{1-593}) and C. elegans DUOX1 (CeDUOX1_{1-589}) were made possible by expression and purification via a baculovirus system. Evaluation of these proteins demonstrated that the isolated hDUOX1_{1-593} does not bind heme and has no intrinsic peroxidase activity. In contrast, CeDUOX1_{1-589} binds heme covalently and exhibits a modest peroxidase activity, but does not oxidize bromide ion. Surprisingly, the heme appears to have two covalent links to the C. elegans protein despite the absence of a second conserved carboxyl group in the active site.

Two alternatively spliced transcript variants encoding the same protein have been described for this gene.
