= Dual oxidase 2 =

Protein-coding gene in the species Homo sapiens

DUOX2

Identifiers
- Aliases: DUOX2, LNOX2, NOXEF2, P138-TOX, TDH6, THOX2, dual oxidase 2
- External IDs: OMIM: 606759; MGI: 3036280; GeneCards: DUOX2
Enzyme activity
EC #	BRENDA	ExPASy	KEGG	MetaCyc
1.6.3.1	↗	↗	↗	↗

Gene location (Human)
Chr.	Chromosome 15 (human)
Band	15q21.1	Start	45,092,650 bp
Band	15q21.1	End	45,114,172 bp

Gene location (Mouse)
Chr.	Chromosome 2 (mouse)
Band	2|2 E5	Start	122,109,728 bp
Band	2|2 E5	End	122,128,930 bp
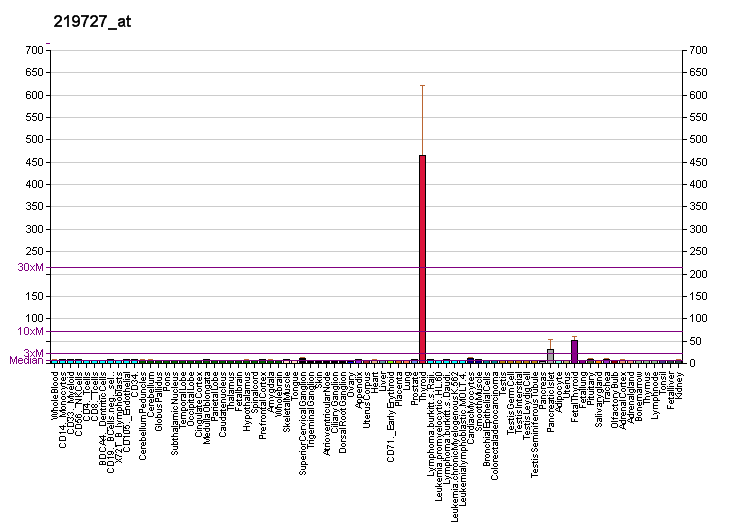
RNA expression pattern
Bgee	Human / Mouse (ortholog); Top expressed in: gallbladder; nasal epithelium; palpebral conjunctiva; right lobe of thyroid gland; left lobe of thyroid gland; gastric mucosa; islet of Langerhans; appendix; sperm; pancreatic epithelial cell / Top expressed in: ileum; jejunum; colon; duodenum; stomach; embryo; urinary bladder; esophagus; pancreas; mouth; More reference expression data
BioGPS	More reference expression data
Gene ontology
Molecular function	calcium ion binding; peroxidase activity; metal ion binding; heme binding; oxidoreductase activity; NAD(P)H oxidase H2O2-forming activity; protein binding; superoxide-generating NAD(P)H oxidase activity
Cellular component	integral component of membrane; membrane; plasma membrane; cell junction; apical plasma membrane; extracellular exosome; endoplasmic reticulum; cytosol; cell surface; cell leading edge; apical part of cell; NADPH oxidase complex
Biological process	cuticle development; bone mineralization; multicellular organism growth; cytokine-mediated signaling pathway; cellular oxidant detoxification; response to virus; response to oxidative stress; thyroid hormone metabolic process; thyroid hormone generation; thyroid gland development; hydrogen peroxide catabolic process; fertilization; inner ear development; response to cAMP; adenohypophysis morphogenesis; hormone metabolic process; hormone biosynthetic process; hydrogen peroxide biosynthetic process; superoxide anion generation; positive regulation of wound healing; positive regulation of cell motility; defense response
Sources:Amigo / QuickGO
Orthologs
Databases	NCBI: entry; OMA: entry
Species	Human	Mouse
Entrez	50506	214593
Ensembl	ENSG00000140279	ENSMUSG00000068452
UniProt	Q9NRD8	A2AQ99
RefSeq (mRNA)	NM_014080; NM_001363711	NM_177610; NM_001362755
RefSeq (protein)	NP_054799; NP_001350640	NP_808278; NP_001349684
Location (UCSC)	Chr 15: 45.09 – 45.11 Mb	Chr 2: 122.11 – 122.13 Mb
PubMed search
- Wikidata
View/Edit Human	View/Edit Mouse

Dual oxidase 2, also known as DUOX2 or ThOX2 (for thyroid oxidase), is an enzyme that in humans is encoded by the DUOX2 gene. Dual oxidase is an enzyme that was first identified in the mammalian thyroid gland. In humans, two isoforms are found; hDUOX1 and hDUOX2 (this enzyme). The protein location is not exclusive to thyroid tissue; hDUOX1 is prominent in airway epithelial cells and hDUOX2 in the salivary glands and gastrointestinal tract.

== Function ==
Investigations into reactive oxygen species (ROS) in biological systems have, until recently, focused on characterization of phagocytic cell processes. It is now well accepted that production of such species is not restricted to phagocytic cells and can occur in eukaryotic non-phagocytic cell types via NADPH oxidase (NOX) or dual oxidase (DUOX). This new family of proteins, termed the NOX/DUOX family or NOX family of NADPH oxidases, consists of homologs to the catalytic moiety of phagocytic NADPH-oxidase, gp91^{phox}. Members of the NOX/DUOX family have been found throughout eukaryotic species, including invertebrates, insects, nematodes, fungi, amoeba, algae, and plants (not found in prokaryotes). These enzymes clearly demonstrate regulated production of ROS as their sole function. Genetic analyses have implicated NOX/DUOX derived ROS in biological roles and pathological conditions including hypertension (NOX1), innate immunity (NOX2/DUOX), otoconia formation in the inner ear (NOX3) and thyroid hormone biosynthesis (DUOX1/2). DUOX2 is the isoform that generates H_{2}O_{2} utilized by thyroid peroxidase (TPO) for the biosynthesis of thyroid hormones, supported by the discovery of congenital hypothyroidism resultant from an inactivating mutation in the DUOX2 gene.

The family currently has seven members including NOX1, NOX2 (formerly known as gp91^{phox}), NOX3, NOX4, NOX5, DUOX1 and DUOX2.

This protein is known as a dual oxidase because it has both a peroxidase homology domain and a gp91^{phox} domain.

Duox are also implicated in lung defence system and especially in cystic fibrosis.

Schema of duox implication in human lung defence system

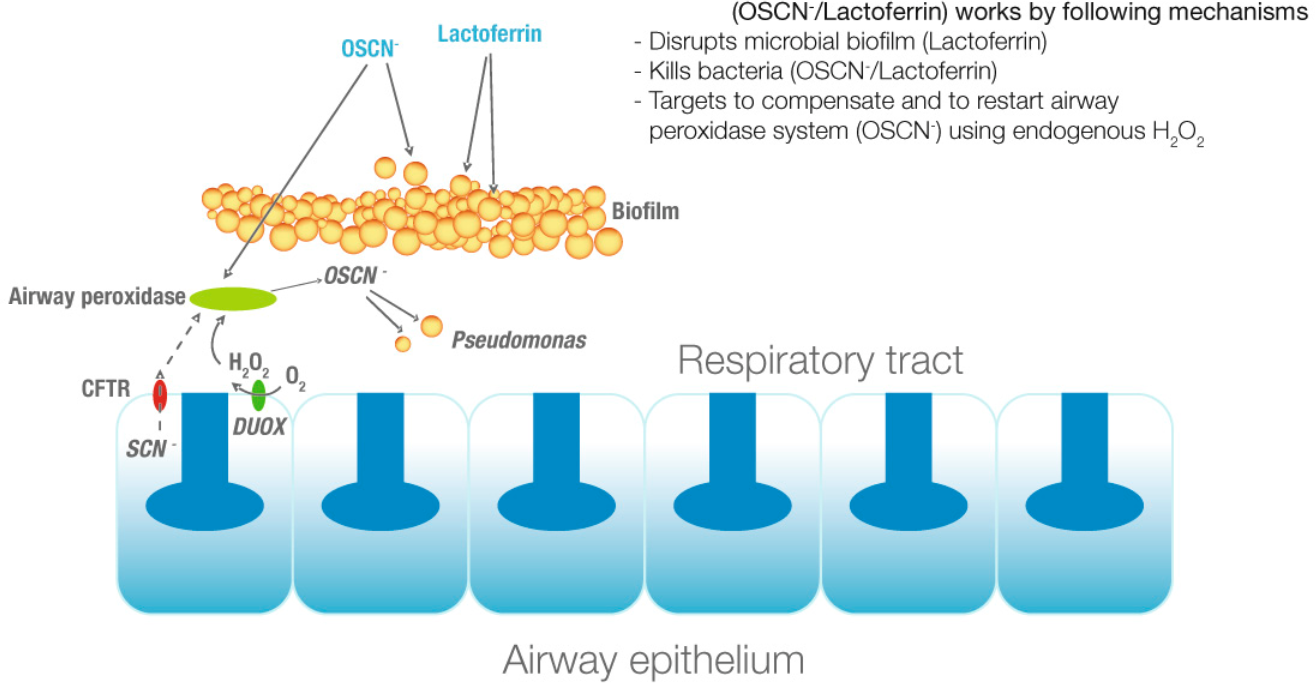
Schematic diagram of the respiratory tract antimicrobial defense system.
