= Respiratory burst =

Immune system chemical weapon

Respiratory burst (or oxidative burst) is the rapid release of the reactive oxygen species (ROS), superoxide anion (O^{−}_{2}) and hydrogen peroxide (H_{2}O_{2}), from different cell types.

This is usually utilised for mammalian immunological defence, but also plays a role in cell signalling. The respiratory burst is also implicated in the ovum of animals following fertilization. It may also occur in plant cells.

== Immunity ==
Immune cells can be divided into myeloid cells and lymphoid cells. Myeloid cells, including macrophages and neutrophils, are especially implicated in the respiratory burst. They are phagocytic, and the respiratory burst is vital for the subsequent degradation of internalised bacteria or other pathogens. This is an important aspect of the innate immunity.

Respiratory burst requires a 10 to 20 fold increase in oxygen consumption through NADPH oxidase (NOX2 in humans) activity. NADPH is the key substrate of NOX2, and bears reducing power. Glycogen breakdown is vital to produce NADPH. This occurs via the pentose phosphate pathway.

The NOX2 enzyme is bound in the phagolysosome membrane. Post bacterial phagocytosis, it is activated, producing superoxide via its redox centre, which transfers electrons from cytosolic NADPH to O_{2} in the phagosome.

2O_{2} + NADPH —> 2O_{2}^{•–} + NADP^{+} + H^{+}

The superoxide can then spontaneously or enzymatically react with other molecules to give rise to other ROS. The phagocytic membrane reseals to limit exposure of the extracellular environment to the generated reactive free radicals.

=== Pathways for reactive species generation ===
Generation of reactive oxygen and reactive nitrogen species in the phagolysosome, implicated in respiratory burst.

There are three main pathways for the generation of reactive oxygen species or reactive nitrogen species (RNS) in effector cells:

1. Superoxide dismutase (or alternatively, myeloperoxidase) generates hydrogen peroxide from superoxide. Hydroxyl radicals are then generated via the Haber–Weiss reaction or the Fenton reaction, of which are both catalyzed by Fe^{2+}.
  O_{2}^{•–}+ H_{2}O_{2} —> ^{•}OH + OH^{–} + O_{2}
2. In the presence of halide ions, prominently chloride ions, myeloperoxidase uses hydrogen peroxide to produce hypochlorous acid.
  H_{2}O_{2} + Cl^{−} —> ClO^{−} + H_{2}O
3. Nitric oxide synthase (the inducible isoform, iNOS, in immunity) catalyses the production of nitric oxide from L-arginine.
  2L-arginine + 3NADPH + 3 H^{+} + 4O_{2} —> 2citrulline + 2NO^{•} + 4H_{2}O + 3NADP^{+}

Nitric oxide may react with superoxide anions to produce peroxynitrite anion.

O_{2}^{•−} + NO^{•} → ONO_{2}^{−}

=== Defense against pathogens ===
The exposure to these reactive species in the respiratory burst results in pathology. This is due to oxidative damage to the engulfed bacteria.

Notably, peroxynitrite is a very strong oxidising agent that can lead to lipid peroxidation, protein oxidation, protein nitration, which are responsible for its bactericidal effects. It may react directly with proteins that contain transition metal centers, such as FeS, releasing Fe^{2+} for the Fenton reaction. Peroxynitrite may also react with various amino acids in the peptide chain, thereby altering protein structure and subsequently, protein function. It most commonly oxidises cysteine, and may indirectly induce tyrosine nitration through other generated RNS. Altered protein function includes changes in enzyme catalytic activity, cytoskeletal organisation and cell signal transduction.

Hypochlorous acid reacts with a range of biomolecules, including DNA, lipids and proteins. HClO may oxidise cysteines and methionines via their sulfhydryl groups and sulfur groups respectively. The former leads to the formation of disulfide bonds, inducing protein crosslinking. Both oxidations result in protein aggregation, and ultimately, cell death. Sulfhydryl groups can be oxidised up to three times by three HClO molecules, forming sulfenic acids, sulfinic acids and R–SO_{3}H, which are increasingly irreversible and bactericidal. Meanwhile, methionine oxidation is reversible. HOCl can also react with primary or secondary amines, producing chloroamines which are toxic to bacteria. Protein cross linking and aggregation may also occur, as well as disruption of FeS groups.

Integral to hypochlorous acid formation is myeloperoxidase. Myeloperoxidase is most abundant in neutrophils, wherein phagocytosis is accompanied by degranulation. This is the fusion of granules with the phagolysosome, releasing their contents, including myeloperoxidase. As many microbicidal products are formed during respiratory burst, the importance of individual molecules in killing invading pathogens is not wholly understood.

Due to the high toxicity of generated antimicrobial products including ROS, neutrophils have a short life span to limit host tissue damage during inflammation.

=== Disease ===
Chronic Granulomatous Disease is an inherited disease of human neutrophils, wherein NOX2 is defective. Phagocytosis may still occur, but without proper functioning NOX2, there is no superoxide production, and therefore no respiratory burst. The bacterial infection is not cleared.

== Cellular signalling ==
=== Non-phagocytic cells ===
In non-phagocytic cells, oxidative burst products are used in intracellular signalling pathways. The generated ROS achieve this via shifting the cell redox state. This may be monitored by the ratio of the antioxidant enzyme glutathione to its oxidised product, glutathione disulphide (GSH:GSSG). Antioxidant enzymes counterbalance redox signalling by eliminating the involved molecules, importantly superoxide anion and nitric oxide. Redox signalling is critical for normal processes such as proliferation, differentiation, as well as vascular function and neurotransmission. It is also involved in disease states such as cancer.

The NADPH oxidase isoform NOX1 transiently produces a burst of superoxide in response to growth factor (e.g. EGF) stimulation of respective receptors. Superoxide is dismutated to hydrogen peroxide at a rate close to the diffusion-limited rate. This spatial restriction for superoxide‘s dismutation allows for specificity of redox signalling. Specificity is also ensured by NOX1 localisation in specific microdomains in the cell’s plasma membrane. Through channels such as aquaporin or diffusion, hydrogen peroxide enters the cytosol. There, it oxidises the cysteine groups of redox-sensitive proteins, which can then transduce signals.

=== Macrophages ===
Oxidative burst in phagocytes is most commonly associated with bacterial killing. However, macrophages, especially alveolar macrophages, usually produce far lower levels of ROS than neutrophils, and may require activation for their bactericidal properties. Instead, their transient oxidative burst regulates the inflammatory response by inducing cytokine synthesis for redox signalling, resulting in an influx of neutrophils and activated macrophages.

=== Cancer cells ===
Cancer cells can manipulate cell signalling by producing excess levels of ROS, thereby constitutively activating pathways to promote their cellular growth and proliferation. Implicated pathways include NF-κB, PI3K, HIFs and MAPKs. In humans, mitochondrial ROS is required alongside those released in the oxidative burst for mitogenic pathway stimulation in oncogenic KRAS cells. However, in oncogenic Kras mice fibroblasts, NADPH oxidase inhibitors have been shown to be sufficient to block these growth factor pathways. Tumorigenic cells also simultaneously maintain high levels of antioxidants to protect against cancer cell death.

== Fertilisation ==
Most notably, oxidative burst post fertilisation can be seen in the sea urchin egg. This is believed to be evolutionally divergent from that in neutrophils.

Hydrogen peroxide is produced by egg oxidase activity following an increase in oxygen consumption. This is essential for the cross-linking of the ovum proteins to prevent lethal polyspermy. Hydrogen peroxide itself is also spermicidal. However, the generated reactive species are maintained at lower levels than in immunity to protect the fertilised egg itself from oxidative damage. This is achieved by the elimination of hydrogen peroxide primarily through the dual function of the same egg oxidase, and secondarily through cytoplasmic ROS scavengers, such as catalase and glutathione.

== In plants ==
Oxidative burst acts as a defence mechanism to pathogen infection in plants. This is seen post PAMPs detection by cell-surface located receptors (e.g. FLS2 or EFR). As in animals, the production of reactive oxygen species in plants is mediated by NADPH oxidase. In plant immunity, the NADPH oxidase subunits RbohD and RbohF have overlapping functions are expressed in different tissues and at different levels. However, in contrast to animal phagocytes, wherein generated ROS are contained in the sealed phagolysosome, oxidative burst in plants is not contained. Consequently, generated ROS bear additional effects alongside pathogen toxicity. Hydrogen peroxide induces oxidative cross-linking of the plant’s cell wall glycoproteins. This reduces susceptibility to enzymatic degradation by pathogens. Systemic acquired resistance, which is analogous to innate immunity in animals, is also induced in the exposed plant cells. Hydrogen peroxide exposure may also result in hypersensitive response, which is the death of a small number of host cells at the site of infection, for the purpose of limiting pathogenic infection. ROS production in plants can be used as a readout for successful pathogen recognition via a luminol-peroxidase based assay.
