= Picropodophyllin =

Names
- IUPAC name (5R,5aR,8aS,9R)-5-hydroxy-9-(3,4,5-trimethoxyphenyl)-5a,6,8a,9-tetrahydro-5H-[2]benzofuro[5,6-f][1,3]benzodioxol-8-one

Identifiers
CAS Number	477-47-4
3D model (JSmol)	Interactive image
ChEBI	CHEBI:75251
ChEMBL	ChEMBL283120
ChemSpider	65362
DrugBank	DB12802
ECHA InfoCard	100.164.896
EC Number	637-166-4
IUPHAR/BPS	7873
KEGG	C10871
PubChem CID	72435
UNII	0F35AOI227
CompTox Dashboard (EPA)	DTXSID80197245
- InChI: InChI=1S/C22H22O8/c1-25-16-4-10(5-17(26-2)21(16)27-3)18-11-6-14-15(30-9-29-14)7-12(11)20(23)13-8-28-22(24)19(13)18/h4-7,13,18-20,23H,8-9H2,1-3H3/t13-,18+,19+,20-/m0/s1 Key: YJGVMLPVUAXIQN-HAEOHBJNSA-N
- SMILES: COC1=CC(=CC(=C1OC)OC)[C@H]2[C@H]3[C@H](COC3=O)[C@H](C4=CC5=C(C=C24)OCO5)O

Properties
Chemical formula	C_{22}H_{22}O_{8}
Molar mass	414.410 g·mol^{−1}

Hazards
- GHS labelling
Pictograms	(GHS06: Toxic) (GHS07: Exclamation mark)
Signal word	Danger
Hazard statements	H301, H312, H315, H319, H335
Precautionary statements	P261, P264, P264+P265, P270, P271, P280, P301+P316, P302+P352, P304+P340, P305+P351+P338, P317, P319, P321, P330, P332+P317, P337+P317, P362+P364, P403+P233, P405, P501
- Except where otherwise noted, data are given for materials in their standard state (at 25 °C [77 °F], 100 kPa). Infobox references

Picropodophyllin is a non-toxic small molecule inhibitor of the insulin-like growth factor-1 receptor (IGF1R). It is a stereoisomer of the molecule podophyllotoxin (PPT) which also acts as an inhibitor of the IGF1R. Both stereoisomers are classified as cyclolignans, with PPT being the trans conformation and picropodophyllin being the cis conformation.

Picropodophyllin is currently being applied in clinical research investigating its viability as an anti-cancer treatment. It is often administered orally in patients with solid tumours. It has shown effectiveness in reducing tumour volume in glioblastoma, rhabdomyosarcoma, and other cancers through the targeting of IGF1R.

== Synthesis ==
Picropodophyllin is a lignan extract from podophyllum resin which is sourced from the roots of Podophyllum plants.

== Clinical applications ==
Picropodophyllin has been used in multiple in-vitro and in-vivo trials investigating its ability to reduce solid tumour volume. Its current primary use is in clinical trials.

=== Administration ===
Picropodophyllin is a relatively non-polar compound, and therefore is administered clinically dissolved in solution or in drug form. In-vitro trials used saline, DMSO, or ethanol to dissolve the picropodophyllin before administering to cell cultures. In-vivo experiments used saline. Clinical trials have also used AXL1717, which is a drug containing picropodophyllin.

=== Glioblastoma ===
Picropodophyllin has been used in in-vitro and in-vivo testing on glioblastoma (GB) cells. In GB cell lines that were cultured and treated with Picropodophyllin, it was demonstrated that picropodophyllin prevents GB cell growth and induces apoptosis. One in-vitro assay demonstrated that out of 12 GB cell lines, all but one had their growth inhibited by the administration of picropodophyllin. Furthermore, an in-vivo assay was conducted which determined that in mice which had xenografted GB tumour cells, picropodophyllin induced strong regression of the xenograft tumours.

=== Astrocytoma ===
A phase 1 clinical trial was conducted on patients suffering from recurrent or progressive malignant astrocytomas. AXL1717, a drug whose main active compound is picropodophyllin, was administered orally at a dosage of 215–400 mg on a 35 day cycle (28 days administered and 7 days off).

9 patients received treatment, with 4 of them showing tumour responses to the Picropodophyllin. The trial also found that the adverse reaction to picropodophyllin, which was neutropenia, was easily detected and reversed in all but one patient.

=== Rhabdomyosarcoma ===
Rhabdomyosarcoma is a cancer that highly expresses IGF1R receptors. In-vitro studies have been conducted to investigate the viability of picropodophyllin as a treatment. In in-vitro cell cultures, certain lines of rhabdomyosarcoma such as RH30 showed 90% of cells had expression of IGF1R.

When treating cell cultures of RH30 and RD with picropodophyllin, researchers found that 24 hour exposure caused a dose dependent decrease in viable cancer cells. Doses above 2μM caused massive apoptosis and cell death.

== Mechanism of action ==
Currently, the specific molecular mechanisms by which picropodophyllin is able to cause apoptosis in cancer cells is unknown. Picropodophyllin suppresses signalling in the IGF1R pathway, which can be observed clinically through a reduction of phosphorylated IGF1R proteins, as well as a reduction of phosphorylated down-stream signalling proteins.

It has also been demonstrated that picropodophyllin interacts with the PI3K/Akt pathway, which mediates neoplastic transformation, apoptosis, and cell cycle progression. Specifically, picropodophyllin induces apoptosis and cell cycle arrest using reactive oxygen species (ROS) generation and inhibition of the PI3K/Akt pathway.

In-vitro investigations show that administration of picropodophyllin significantly increases the expression levels of ROS generating enzymes, including nicotinamide adenine dinucleotide phosphate (NADPH), oxidases (NOX1 and NPX3) and the cytochrome b-245 beta chain (CYBB). The expression of ROS scavenging enzymes remained constant post treatment, resulting in the accumulation of ROS. ROS accumulation has also been demonstrated to inactivate the PI3K/Akt pathway.

Picropodophyllin's ability to cause mitotic arrest in cancer cells is a result of inhibition of microtubule formation. Researchers found that in cells which had been arrested in metaphase, the impact of picropodophyllin administration was like that of Nocodazole, a microtubule destabiliser. Picropodophyllin does not directly bind b-tubulin in microtubules, instead mediating mitotic arrest by interfering with microtubule dynamics.

== Side effects ==
Picropodophyllin can cause adverse effects, primarily being febrile neutropenia.

Picropodophyllin is undergoing investigation in cancer treatment in part due to its clinical activity accompanied by a lack of metabolic toxicity.
