= Setanaxib =

Chemical compound

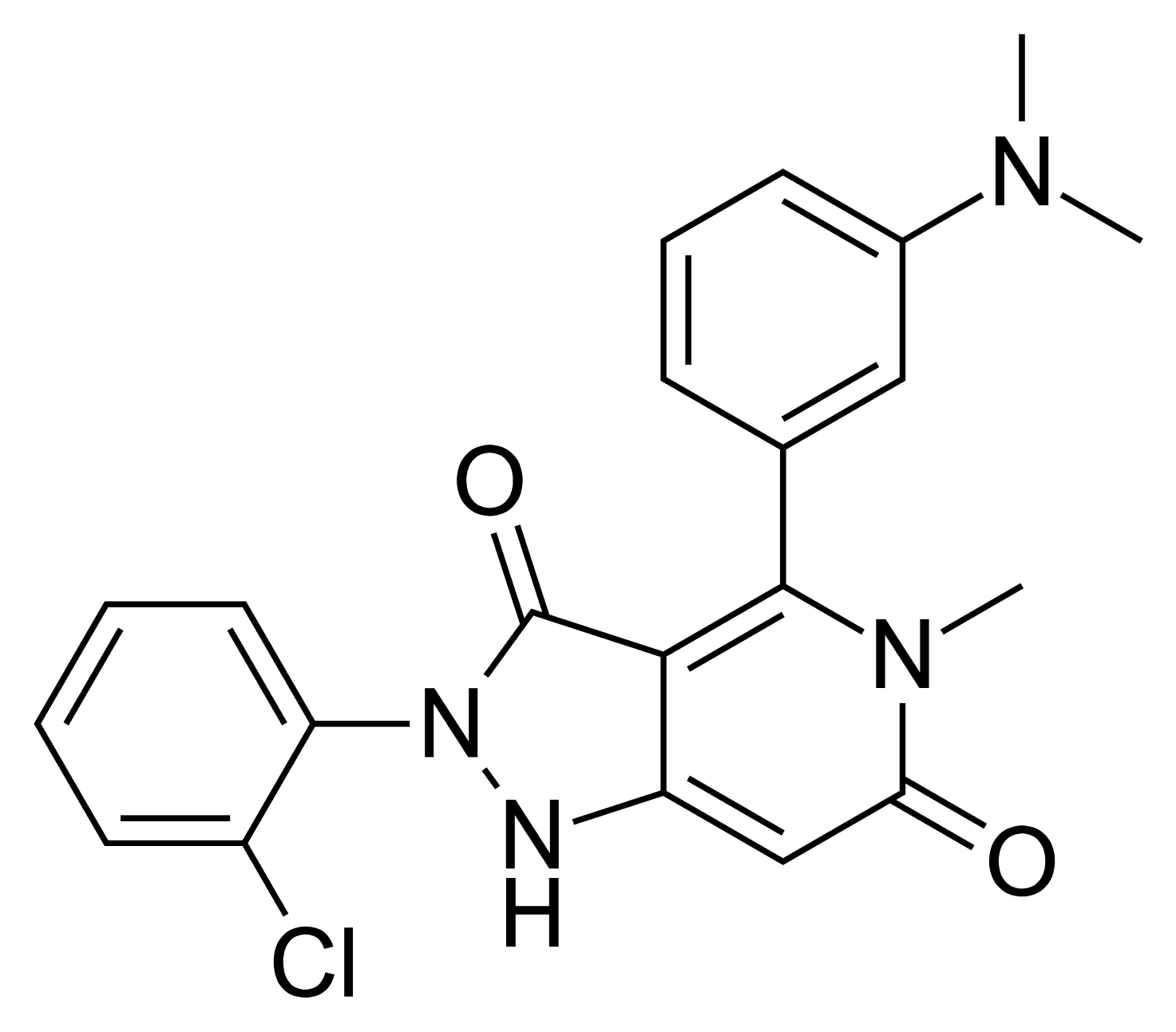

Clinical data
- Other names: GKT-831

Legal status
- Legal status: Investigational

Identifiers
- IUPAC name: 2-(2-Chlorophenyl)-4-[3-(dimethylamino)phenyl]-5-methyl-1H-pyrazolo[4,3-c]pyridine-3,6-dione
- CAS Number: 1218942-37-0
- ChemSpider: 29785291
- UNII: 45II35329V
- CompTox Dashboard (EPA): DTXSID30153432

Chemical and physical data
- Formula: C_{21}H_{19}ClN_{4}O_{2}
- Molar mass: 394.86 g·mol^{−1}
- 3D model (JSmol): Interactive image
- SMILES: CN1C(=O)C=C2C(=C1C3=CC(=CC=C3)N(C)C)C(=O)N(N2)C4=CC=CC=C4Cl
- InChI: InChI=1S/C21H19ClN4O2/c1-24(2)14-8-6-7-13(11-14)20-19-16(12-18(27)25(20)3)23-26(21(19)28)17-10-5-4-9-15(17)22/h4-12,23H,1-3H3; Key:RGYQPQARIQKJKH-UHFFFAOYSA-N

Setanaxib (development code GKT-831) is an experimental orally bioavailable dual inhibitor of NADPH oxidase isoforms NOX4 and NOX1. Setanaxib is a member of the pyrazolopyridine dione chemical series. The compound is the only specific NOX inhibitor that has entered into clinical trials.

Setanaxib has demonstrated biological activity in a number of in vitro and in vivo animal pharmacological models including squamous cell carcinoma of the head and neck, diabetic nephropathy, retinopathy, atherosclerosis, liver fibrosis, osteoporosis, pulmonary hypertension, and idiopathic pulmonary fibrosis. This drug candidate has been investigated in humans in a Phase 2 proof-of-concept trial in primary biliary cholangitis and a Phase 2 proof-of-concept trial in diabetic nephropathy.

Setanaxib was developed by Genkyotex, a French biotech company based in Archamps. In 2020, Calliditas Therapeutics AB acquired a controlling interest in Genkyotex, which was delisted and became a fully owned subsidiary of Calliditas in October 2021. Calliditas, a commercial stage biotech company headquartered in Stockholm, is currently developing setanaxib in two clinical trials in human patients.

== Development ==
The strategy of development of setanaxib was initially focused on the treatment of fibrosis and particularly idiopathic pulmonary fibrosis (IPF). Setanaxib obtained orphan drug designation from regulatory agencies in the US and EU in early 2010. It was later granted FDA Fast Track Designation in PBC in August 2021. Genkyotex first initiated a phase 2 proof-of-concept study in diabetic nephropathy in 2014. However, the trial did not reach the primary clinical endpoint of reduction in albuminuria. Following this, the company conducted a Phase 2 trial in patients with primary biliary cholangitis, reporting out data in 2019. The 111-patient study tested two doses of setanaxib, 400 mg once daily and 400 mg twice daily, versus placebo. The primary endpoint was percentage change in serum gamma-glutamyl transferase (GGT) at 24 weeks; the study did not meet this endpoint. However, the study did show promising data in post-hoc analysis, achieving significance in the secondary endpoint of reduction in alkaline phosphatase (ALP). The higher dose of setanaxib demonstrated a 12.9% reduction of ALP over the 24-week treatment period, with a p-value of p<0.002 vs placebo. Genkyotex then carried out further analysis of a subgroup of the patient population with elevated liver stiffness levels. Liver stiffness, which was measured using noninvasive transient elastography, is an indicator of fibrosis. The study found that patients in stage 3 fibrosis, aka those with baseline liver stiffness levels of 9.6kPa or greater, who were dosed with setanaxib had a 22% reduction in liver stiffness; meanwhile, the patients in this subgroup who received placebo had a 4% increase in liver stiffness. The study also investigated the impact of setanaxib treatment on quality of life outcomes using the PBC-40 questionnaire, a profile measure covering six PBC specific quality of life domains (cognitive, social, emotional function, fatigue, itch, and other symptoms). Treatment with the twice-daily dose of setanaxib resulted in positive effects on emotional function and social quality of life domains, as well as a statistically significant improvement in fatigue. Fatigue is a common problem in PBC, one which has been characterised by patient reports as ‘dramatically impairing’ quality of life.

Setanaxib is now being developed by Calliditas Therapeutics, which is running two clinical trials with this drug candidate. The TRANSFORM study is a Phase 2b/3 study with an adaptive design. The study is investigating the effect of setanaxib in PBC patients who have an intolerance or inadequate response to ursodeoxycholic acid (UDCA), and liver stiffness of ≥8.8 kilopascals (kPa).The primary endpoint is reduction in alkaline phosphatase (ALP). The first part of the trial will have three arms – a placebo arm and two dosing arms, with setanaxib 1200 mg/day and 1600 mg/day. Calliditas will conduct an interim analysis after the 99th patient has completed 24 weeks of treatment. Following this analysis, one dose of setanaxib will be selected to move forward with for the remaining, Phase 3, portion of the trial. The trial will also investigate the change in liver stiffness and the effect of setanaxib on fatigue in patients.

Calliditas is also conducting a Phase 2 proof-of-concept trial in patients with squamous cell carcinoma of the head and neck and who have moderate or high cancer associated fibroblast (CAF) density tumours. This trial follows on from promising pre-clinical data from Professor Gareth Thomas at the University of Southampton, which demonstrated that setanaxib reversed CAF differentiation and overcame CD8 T-cell exclusion in vivo and improved survival in a relevant mouse tumour model. The Calliditas Phase 2 trial will investigate the effect of setanaxib 800 mg twice daily in conjunction with 200mg of pembrolizumab, administered IV. As is standard for this immunotherapy, pembrolizumab will be administered every 3 weeks until unacceptable toxicity or progression. A tumour biopsy will be taken prior to treatment and then again after 9 weeks of treatment.

Setanaxib is also being evaluated in investigator led trials in idiopathic pulmonary fibrosis (IPF) and diabetic kidney disease (DKD). The trial in DKD is being funded by JDRF and is investigating a twice-daily 400mg dose of setanaxib across 48 weeks of treatment. The study in IPF is fully funded by an $8.9 million grant awarded by the U.S. National Institutes of Health (NIH) and is being led by Professor Victor Thannickal at the University of Alabama at Birmingham. The study will evaluate the safety and efficacy of 400mg BID setanaxib in 60 IPF patients who will also be receiving pirfenidone or nintedanib, the standard of care in this disease.

== History ==
Setanaxib was discovered in the early 2000s by scientists at Genkyotex and was patented in 2007. Setanaxib was initially developed for idiopathic pulmonary fibrosis and obtained orphan drug designation both by FDA and EMEA by end of 2010. Setanaxib was developed by rational drug design following a campaign of high-throughput screening on several NOX isoforms. The initial lead compound GKT136901, a pyrazolopyridine dione derivative was further structurally modified in order to enhance its binding affinity and improve its pharmacokinetic properties, resulting in the discovery of setanaxib.

== Toxicity and potential risks ==
Setanaxib did not show any signs of toxicity in a phase 1 clinical trial in healthy volunteers. A study with high-dose setanaxib assessed the safety and pharmacokinetics of the drug in 46 healthy subjects. The study had two parts: a single ascending dose (SAD) part and a multiple ascending dose (MAD) part with dosing up to 1600mg/day. This trial demonstrated a that setanaxib had a favourable safety and pharmacokinetic profile even at high doses.
