= NADPH oxidase =

Enzyme complex

NAD(P)H oxidase

Identifiers
- EC no.: 1.6.3.1
- CAS no.: 77106-92-4

Databases
- BRENDA: enzyme data
- ExPASy: NiceZyme view
- KEGG: enzyme entry
- MetaCyc: metabolic pathway
- Rhea: reactions
- PDB structures: RCSB PDB PDBe PDBsum
Search
- PMC: articles
- PubMed: articles
- NCBI: proteins

Ferric reductase

Identifiers
- Symbol: NADPH oxidase
- Pfam: PF01794
- InterPro: IPR013130
- TCDB: 5.B.1
- OPM superfamily: 464
- OPM protein: 5o05
Available protein structures:
- PDB: IPR013130 PF01794 (ECOD; PDBsum)
- AlphaFold: IPR013130; PF01794

NADPH oxidase (nicotinamide adenine dinucleotide phosphate oxidase) is a membrane-bound enzyme complex that faces the extracellular space. It can be found in the plasma membrane as well as in the membranes of phagosomes used by neutrophil white blood cells to engulf microorganisms. Human isoforms of the catalytic component of the complex include NOX1, NOX2, NOX3, NOX4, NOX5, DUOX1, and DUOX2.

== Reaction ==
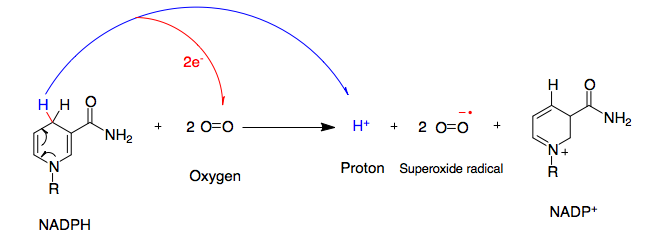
Overall reaction for the formation of superoxide from NADPH

NADPH oxidase catalyzes the production of superoxide free radicals by transferring one electron to two oxygen molecules from NADPH.

NADPH + 2O_{2} ⇌ NADP^{+} + 2O^{−}_{2} + H^{+}

== Types ==
In mammals, NADPH oxidase is found in two types: one in white blood cells (neutrophilic) and the other in vascular cells, differing in biochemical structure and functions. Neutrophilic NADPH oxidase produces superoxide almost instantaneously, whereas the vascular enzyme produces superoxide in minutes to hours. Moreover, in white blood cells, superoxide has been found to transfer electrons across the membrane to extracellular oxygen, while in vascular cells, the radical anion appears to be released mainly intracellularly.

=== Neutrophilic type ===
The isoform found in neutrophils is made up of six subunits. These subunits are:

- a Rho GTPase, usually Rac1 or Rac2 (Rac stands for Rho-related C3 botulinum toxin substrate)
- Five phagocytic oxidase subunits:
  - gp91^{phox} (NOX2)
  - p22^{phox} (CYBA)
  - p40^{phox} (NCF4)
  - p47^{phox} (NCF1)
  - p67^{phox} (NCF2)

=== Vascular type ===
There are several vascular isoforms of the complex which use paralogs the NOX2 subunit:

- NOX1
- NOX3
- NOX4
- NOX5

=== Thyroid type ===
There are two further paralogs of NOX2 subunit in the thyroid:

- DUOX1
- DUOX2

== Structure ==
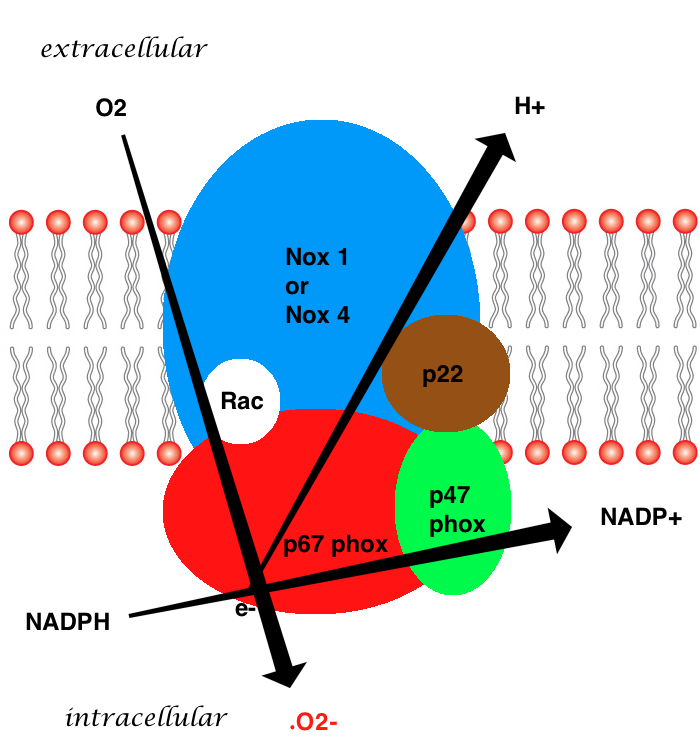
Vascular NAD(P)H generating a superoxide (coloured by subunit).

The whole structure of the membrane-bound vascular enzyme is composed of five parts: two cytosolic subunits (p47phox and p67phox), a cytochrome b558 which consists of gp91phox, p22phox and a small G protein Rac. Generation of the superoxide in vascular NADPH occurs by a one-electron reduction of oxygen via the gp91phox subunit, using reduced NADPH as the electron donor. The small G protein carries an essential role in the activation of the oxidase by switching between a GDP-bound (inactive) and GTP-linked (active) forms.

== Biological function ==
NADPH oxidases (NOXes) are one of the major sources of cellular reactive oxygen species (ROS), and they still are the focus of extensive research interest due to their exclusive function in producing ROS under normal physiological conditions. The NADPH oxidase complex is dormant under normal circumstances but is activated to assemble in the membranes during respiratory burst. The activated NADPH oxidase generates superoxide which has roles in animal immune response and plant signalling.

Superoxide can be produced in phagosomes which have ingested bacteria and fungi, or it can be produced outside of the cell. In macrophages, superoxide kills bacteria and fungi by mechanisms that are not yet fully understood. Superoxide spontaneously dismutates to form peroxide which is then protonated to produce hydrogen peroxide. Opinions are polarised as to how the oxidase kills microbes in neutrophils. On the one hand it is thought that hydrogen peroxide acts as substrate for myeloperoxidase to produce hypochlorous acid. It may also inactivate critical metabolic enzymes, initiate lipid peroxidation, damage iron-sulphur clusters, and liberate redox-active iron, which allows the generation of indiscriminate oxidants such as the hydroxyl radical. An alternative view is that the oxidase elevates the pH in the vacuole to about 9.0, which is optimal for the neutral proteases that degranulate from the cytoplasmic granules (where they are inactive at pH ~5.5) and it pumps potassium into the vacuole, which solubilises the enzymes, and it is the activated proteases that kill and digest the microbes.

In insects, NOXes had some functions clarified. Arthropods have three NOX types (NOX4-art, an arthropod-specific p22-phox-independent NOX4, and two calcium-dependent enzymes, DUOX). In the gut, DUOX-dependent ROS production from bacteria-stimulated Drosophila melanogaster mucosa is an important pathogen-killing mechanism and can increase defecation as a defense response. In Aedes aegypti, DUOX is involved in the control of the gut indigenous microbiota. Rhodnius prolixus has calcium activated DUOX, which is involved in eggshell hardening, and NOX5, which is involved in the control of gut motility and blood digestion.

=== Regulation ===
Careful regulation of NADPH oxidase activity is crucial to maintain a healthy level of ROS in the body. The enzyme is dormant in resting cells but becomes rapidly activated by several stimuli, including bacterial products and cytokines. Vascular NADPH oxidases are regulated by a variety of hormones and factors known to be important players in vascular remodeling and disease. These include thrombin, platelet-derived growth factor (PDGF), tumor necrosis factor (TNFa), lactosylceramide, interleukin-1, and oxidized LDL. It is also stimulated by agonists and arachidonic acid. Conversely, assembly of the complex can be inhibited by apocynin and diphenylene iodonium. Apocynin decreases influenza-induced lung inflammation in mice in vivo and so may have clinical benefits in the treatment of influenza.

Ang-1 triggers NOX2, NOX4, and the mitochondria to release ROS and that ROS derived from these sources play distinct roles in the regulation of the Ang-1/Tie 2 signaling pathway and pro-angiogenic responses.

== Pathology ==
Superoxides are crucial in killing foreign bacteria in the human body. Consequently, under-activity can lead to an increased susceptibility to organisms such as catalase-positive microbes, and over-activity can lead to oxidative stress and cell damage.

Excessive production of ROS in vascular cells causes many forms of cardiovascular disease including hypertension, atherosclerosis, myocardial infarction, and ischemic stroke. Atherosclerosis is caused by the accumulation of macrophages containing cholesterol (foam cells) in artery walls (in the intima). ROS produced by NADPH oxidase activate an enzyme that makes the macrophages adhere to the artery wall (by polymerizing actin fibers). This process is counterbalanced by NADPH oxidase inhibitors, and by antioxidants. An imbalance in favor of ROS produces atherosclerosis. In vitro studies have found that the NADPH oxidase inhibitors apocynin and diphenyleneiodonium, along with the antioxidants N-acetyl-cysteine and resveratrol, depolymerized the actin, broke the adhesions, and allowed foam cells to migrate out of the intima.

One study suggests a role for NADPH oxidase in ketamine-induced loss of neuronal parvalbumin and GAD67 expression. Similar loss is observed in schizophrenia, and the results may point at the NADPH oxidase as a possible player in the pathophysiology of the disease. Nitro blue tetrazolium is used in a diagnostic test, in particular, for chronic granulomatous disease, a disease in which there is a defect in NADPH oxidase; therefore, the phagocyte is unable to make the reactive oxygen species or radicals required for bacterial killing, resulting in bacteria thriving within the phagocyte. The higher the blue score the better the cell is at producing reactive oxygen species.

It has also been shown that NADPH oxidase plays a role in the mechanism that induces the formation of sFlt-1, a protein that deactivates certain proangiogenic factors that play a role in the development of the placenta, by facilitating the formation of reactive oxygen species, which are suspected intermediaries in sFlt-1 formation. These effects are in part responsible for inducing pre-eclampsia in pregnant women

=== Mutations ===
Mutations in the NADPH oxidase subunit genes cause several Chronic Granulomatous Diseases (CGD), characterized by extreme susceptibility to infection. These include:

- X-linked chronic granulomatous disease (CGD)
- Autosomal recessive cytochrome b-negative CGD
- Autosomal recessive cytochrome b-positive CGD type I
- Autosomal recessive cytochrome b-positive CGD type II.

In these diseases, cells have a low capacity for phagocytosis, and persistent bacterial infections occur. Areas of infected cells are common, granulomas. A similar disorder called neutrophil immunodeficiency syndrome is linked to a mutation in the RAC2, also a part of the complex.

=== Inhibition ===
NADPH oxidase can be inhibited by apocynin, nitric oxide (NO), and diphenylene iodonium. Apocynin acts by preventing the assembly of the NADPH oxidase subunits. Apocynin decreases influenza-induced lung inflammation in mice in vivo and so may have clinical benefits in the treatment of influenza.

Inhibition of NADPH oxidase by NO blocks the source of oxidative stress in the vasculature. NO donor drugs (nitrovasodilators) have therefore been used for more than a century to treat coronary artery disease, hypertension, and heart failure by preventing excess superoxide from deteriorating healthy vascular cells.

More advanced NADPH oxidase inhibitors include GKT-831 (Formerly GKT137831), a dual Inhibitor of isoforms NOX4 and NOX1 which was patented in 2007. The compound was initially developed for Idiopathic pulmonary fibrosis and obtained orphan drug designation by the FDA and EMA at end of 2010.
