= Kidney ischemia =

Kidney disease

Kidney ischemia is a disease with a high morbidity and mortality rate. Blood vessels shrink and undergo apoptosis which results in poor blood flow in the kidneys. More complications happen when failure of the kidney functions result in toxicity in various parts of the body which may cause septic shock, hypovolemia, and a need for surgery. What causes kidney ischemia is not entirely known, but several pathophysiology relating to this disease have been elucidated. Possible causes of kidney ischemia include the activation of IL-17C and hypoxia due to surgery or transplant. Several signs and symptoms include injury to the microvascular endothelium, apoptosis of kidney cells due to overstress in the endoplasmic reticulum, dysfunctions of the mitochondria, autophagy, inflammation of the kidneys, and maladaptive repair.

Kidney ischemia can be diagnosed by checking the levels of several biomarkers such as clusterin and cystatin C. While the duration of ischemia was used as a biomarker, it was found that it has significant flaws in predicting renal function outcomes. More emerging treatments are in the clinical trials such as Bendavia in targeting mitochondrial dysfunction and using Mesenchymal Stem Cell Therapy. Several receptors agonists and antagonists have shown promise in animal studies; however, they have not been proven clinically yet.

== Causes ==
Little is known as to what causes ischemic injury in the kidneys; however, several physical insults are stated to be activated during injury. Physical stress such as infarction, surgery and transplant may produce kidney ischemia. Dietary habits and genetics could cause ischemic injury, as well. Diseases such as sepsis can cause kidney ischemia too.

=== Infarction or Physical Injury ===
Infarction is defined as the blockage of blood flow in tissues or organs, which may cause necrosis or death of a group of cells in the tissue. In studies of mice models, clamping of the kidney may result in kidney ischemia.

=== Renal Surgery and Transplant ===
Renal surgery and coronary artery bypass grafting can produce renal ischemia and reperfusion injury. This could lead to an acute kidney injury. Moreover, renal ischemia can cause the delay of graft function after renal transplant and can cause rejection of the transplant.

=== Dietary Habits ===
In studies of mice models, a high-fat diet can induce greater injury to the kidney with renal ischemia-reperfusion as compared to mice with normal diet. This is because in a high-fat diet model, accumulation of phospholipids resulted in enlarged lysosomes within proximal tubular cells. This accumulation of phospholipids lead to an increase aggregation of ubiquitin in the kidney cells. When this happens, autophagy becomes exaggerated and results in malfunction of the mitochondria and inflammation of the tissue.

==== Atherosclerosis ====
A common cause of ischemic renal disease is atherosclerosis. Atherosclerosis is a specific type of arteriosclerosis. Arteriosclerosis is defined as the thickening or stiffening or both of the blood vessels; more specifically, atherosclerosis refers to the buildup of cholesterol and fats in the artery walls. Because the blood vessels carry oxygen and nutrients throughout the body, having atherosclerosis restrict blood flow and consequently prevent necessary nutrients to reach the kidneys. This accounts for 60-97% of renal arterial lesions, which could lead to the occlusion of the renal artery and ischemic atrophy of the kidneys.

=== Genetics ===
Several genetic pathways that lead to apoptosis of kidney cells have been implicated in mice models and in-vitro assays. These are proapoptotic genes that can be categorized in two: extrinsic and intrinsic pathways. The extrinsic pathway are directly induced upon renal ischemic injury, while intrinsic pathways are dependent on mitochondrial signaling pathways. Moreover, several genes have been implicated as risk factors in the development of ischemic injury.

==== Extrinsic Pathway ====
Activation of pro-caspase 8 initiates apoptosis via signaling from cell-surface death receptors such as Fas proteins and their ligands FADD and DAXX. This series of signaling cascade generally regulates programmed cell-death or apoptosis. Upregulation of Fas and FADD protein has occurred in mice models after a 24h period of ischemic injury. This is also shown in cell-based assays wherein tubule cells are monitored after ischemic-like injury. This shows that the Fas-pathway may play a role in the pathogenesis of the apoptosis of tubule cells during the early ischemic-reperfusion period. The role of DAXX is still unclear; however, DAXX mediates both Fas-dependent and TGF-beta-induced apoptosis and renal induction of TGF-beta is well documented in renal ischemia studies.

==== Intrinsic Pathway ====
Activation of pro-caspase 9 is dependent on mitochondrial signaling pathways which are regulated by the Bcl-2 family of proteins. Activation of Bcl-2 proteins such as Bax and Bak triggers a signaling cascade that results in the release of cytochrome c into the cytosol. This then activates pro-caspase 9 and results in apoptosis of the cells.

==== Genetic Risk Factors ====
Polymorphisms in genes have been shown to increase or decrease risk of renal ischemic injury. Genes such as Apolipoprotein E (APO E), which controls cholesterol metabolism, NADPH Oxidase which regulates oxidative stress, Angiotensin-converting enzyme (ACE) for vasomotor regulation, HSP72 which helps in tolerance of ischemic injury, Interleukin cytokines which is an inflammation modulator, and VEGF which regulates angiogenesis or the formation of blood vessels have all been shown to have significant effects in acute kidney injury.

===== Apolipoprotein E =====
Apolipoprotein E are proteins that metabolize fats in the body. In studies of patients undergoing coronary artery bypass grafting, carriers of APO-E e4 allele was found to have a decreased risk of acute kidney injury compared to non-carriers of the allele.

===== NADPH Oxidase =====
NADPH Oxidase regulates oxidative stress by conjugating with reactive oxygen species in cells. Polymorphisms in NADPH Oxidase p22phox and with the T allele has been shown to have a greater risk of dialysis and mortality.

===== Angiotensin-converting Enzyme =====
Angiotensin-converting enzyme regulates vasomotor movement by controlling blood pressure going through the kidneys. Similarly to the APO-E polymorphism, patients with the D-allele for ACE has an increased risk of acute kidney injury after coronary artery bypass grafting, as well.

===== HSP72 =====
In infant studies, it was shown that HSP72 gene with the G allele gave an increased risk for acute kidney injury.

===== Interleukin =====
Researchers have found that IL-17C is activated in kidney injury. In hypoxia-induced studies of mice, an upregulation of the synthesis of IL-17C was evident upon oxygen loss in the kidney. Moreover, Knockout variants of the IL-17C decreased the inflammation caused by activation of IL-17C.Using antibodies and siRNA against IL-17C also provided the same results. Also, studies of IL-60174GG showed that carriers of this polymorphism have a higher creatinine levels in the blood; however, carriers of the G-allele of IL-10 have a decreased risk of death after organ failure.

===== VEGF =====
Unlike with HSP72 polymorphism, infant studies show that VEGF with a homozygous A allele resulted in reduced risk for acute kidney injury.

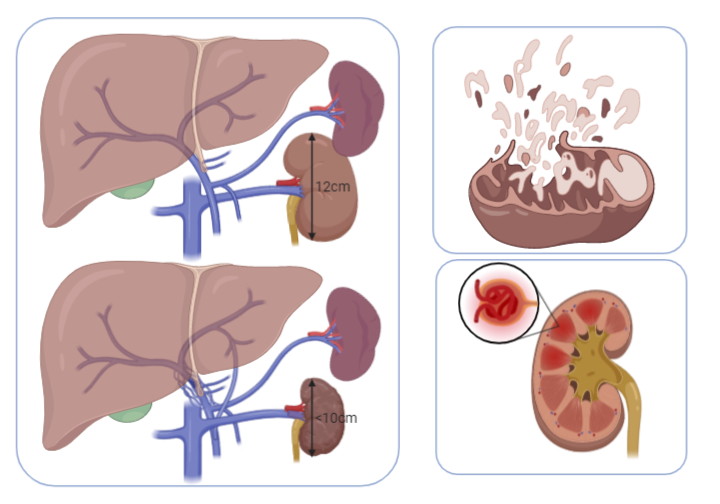
Examples of Signs and Symptoms of Kidney Ischemia. On the left shows the difference in the size of the kidneys resulting from Kidney Ischemia. Kidney Ischemia may result in a shrinkage of the kidney to about 2cm or more. The top right shows the disruption of the mitochondria due to dysfunctions, This leads to a release of proapoptotic proteins such as cytochrome c and results in cell death. The lower right shows inflammation of the glomeruli of the kidneys.

== Pathophysiology ==
Several pathophysiological conditions that change when the kidney is undergoing ischemic injuries are listed below. This includes changes in the vasculature, endoplasmic reticulum stress, disfunction of the mitochondria, autophagy of cells, inflammation, and incorrect or maladaptive repair.

=== Vasculature ===
Normal functions of the kidney require a high amount of oxygen, as such the oxygen supply to the kidney is well regulated. Production of adenosine triphosphate and nitric oxide requires a high concentration of oxygen. These compounds, as well as some reactive oxygen species, are required for the kidney to function properly. With an injury, cellular respiration is compromised. This leads to an imbalance of the supply of oxygen and the products of cellular respiration. When that happens, the kidney undergoes oxidative stress and injury to the microvascular endothelium promotes the recruitment of leukocytes and platelets. This leads to changes in perfusion and oxygen delivery.

=== Endoplasmic Reticulum Stress ===
Misfolded and unfolded proteins accumulate in the endoplasmic reticulum. This triggers the unfolded protein response (UPR). The unfolded protein response is an adaptive mechanism to restore cell and tissue homeostasis. If the stress is too severe, the maladaptive response is activated and the C/EBP Homologous Protein pathway (CHOP) is induced. This leads to apoptosis.

=== Mitochondrial Dysfunction ===
In acute kidney ischemia, the proximal tubules are vulnerable to mitochondrial dysfunction because they rely on aerobic metabolism and they are in a more oxidized state as compared to the distal tubules. When mitochondrial dysfunction happens, cellular respiration is disrupted. This leads to the mitochondria releasing pro-apoptotic proteins such as cytochrome c and end up in the death of kidney cells.

=== Autophagy ===
During ischemic stress, the cross-talk between the mitochondria and the UPR is activated. This results in autophagy by which proteins, organelles, and cytoplasmic components are recycled and degraded by the lysosomes. The process of autophagy helps in removing unnecessary components of the cells to maintain more important functions. In this case, autophagy is induced in kidneys in response to hypoxia to protect against further kidney injury.

=== Inflammation ===
The renal inflammatory process involves events that lead to injury or death of renal cells. When the kidneys undergo inflammatory responses, it produces mediators such as bradykinin, histamine, and pro-inflammatory cytokines such as interleukin-1 and tumor necrosis factor-a. In mice models, studies wherein removal of these mediators from plasma were observed and has shown beneficial to mice.

=== Maladaptive Repair ===
When an injury is severe, the adaptive responses that are activated to restore normal cell and tissue homeostasis become maladaptive. This leads to cell and tissue malfunction. This could lead to chronic kidney disease progression.

=== Physical Symptoms ===
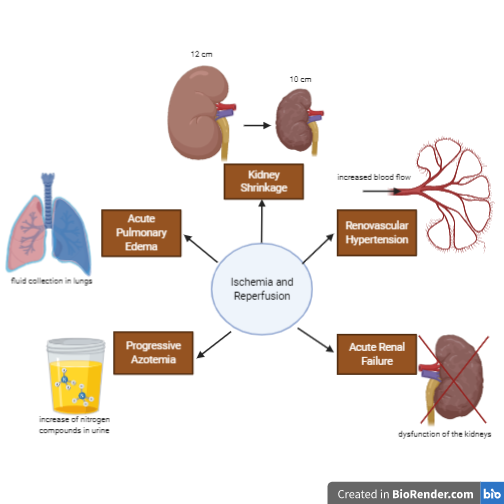
Physical symptoms implicated with kidney ischemia includes kidney shrinkage or a difference in kidney sizes, renovascular hypertension, acute renal failure, progressive azotemia, diagnosed by an increase of nitrogen compounds in urine, and acute pulmonary edema which is excess fluid in the lungs.

Kidney features can be clinically suggestive of renal ischemia. Because renal failure can be correlated to hypertension, both of these situations have been observed. In general, kidney sizes differ in patients with acute kidney ischemia. Hypertension, acute renal failure, progressive azotemia, and acute pulmonary edema are also signs of a developing ischemic injury for hypertensive patients.

==== Kidney size differences ====
In normal patients, the length of the two kidneys only differ by less than 1.5 cm; however, hypertensive patients tend to have an asymmetric kidney size. This strongly suggests ischemic renal disease.

==== Renovascular hypertension ====
Renovascular hypertension or renal artery stenosis is characterized as an increase in blood pressure through the arteries to the kidneys. This is due to an abnormal narrowing of the arteries.

==== Acute Renal Failure caused by the treatment of hypertension ====
In patients with hypertension, treatment of the disease using Angiotensin-converting enzyme inhibitors (ACEIs) are sometimes necessary. The glomerular filtration rate (GFR) in patients is regulated by vasoconstriction of the efferent arteriole. When ACEI is taken by the patient, this vasoconstrictor effect of the efferent arteriole is blocked. This then leads to a decrease in GFR and leads to acute renal failure. Studies have shown that 6-38% of patients with renal vascular disease or hypertension will develop acute renal ischemia through acute renal failure.

===== Progressive Azotemia (with Renovascular Hypertension, refractory or severe hypertension, or atherosclerotic diseases) =====
Azotemia is characterized as an increase of creatinine and blood urea nitrogen (BUN) in the plasma. Patients who have renovascular hypertension often get a deterioration of the renal function.

Likewise above, patients who are being treated with an antihypertensive drug for renovascular, refractory or severe hypertension exhibit progressive azotemia. Acute kidney ischemia may result from taking ACEIs due to the alteration of intrarenal hemodynamics.

==== Acute pulmonary edema ====
Acute pulmonary edema is characterized as a fluid collection in the air sacs of the lungs. This makes it difficult for patients to breathe. Patients with poorly-controlled hypertension and renal insufficiency usually also have recurrent acute pulmonary edema. While patients may have other risk factors for having pulmonary edema, volume-dependent renovascular hypertension appears to be the dominant factor.

== Diagnosis and Screening ==
Screening of Biomarkers is one way to diagnose a patient if their kidney is functioning normally.

=== Biomarkers ===
- Creatinine - Serum creatinine is a standard biomarker to define acute kidney injury. However, it is insensitive, nonspecific. Also, it is a fairly late marker of damage, highly dependent on diet, skeletal muscle function, and kidney stability.
- Clusterin - Clusterin is a protein ubiquitously expressed in different cell lines. Secreted clusterin is involved in lipid transport. The cells release clusterin as a response to cell stress. This is due to clusterin being able to protect the cell by reducing oxidative stress and by binding to misfolded proteins.
- Cystatin C - Cystatin C is produced in kidney cells and is used as a biomarker. The level of cystatin C is used to determine whether the kidney is functioning well or not since it is removed from the kidney through glomerular filtration. Therefore, a high amount of cystatin C in the blood is a determinant of kidney injury.
- EGF - lower levels of EGF mRNA and proteins in the kidneys are indicative of injury after kidney ischemia and reperfusion.
- KIM-1 - also known as Kidney Injury Model 1 is a protein that is highly expressed upon kidney injury. Therefore, higher levels of KIM-1 signifies that there is an injury with proximal tubes due to ischemia.
- IL-6 - Interleukin-6 expression is a response to ischemia and reperfusion injury linked to renal dysfunction. This is also highly expressed when a transplant of the kidney is rejected.
- Endothelin-1 - Endothelin-1 is a vasoconstrictor and can be detected in the urine. More specifically, urinary endothelin-1 levels are used as an acute marker in cold ischemic reperfusion and injury.
- NGAL - neutrophil gelatinase-associated lipocalin 2 is expressed in neutrophils and in low levels in the kidney, prostate, and epithelia of the respiratory and alimentary tracts. (SOURCE). NGAL is used as a biomarker for kidney injury. This is because a high NGAL excretion can be correlated to ischemic insult. NGAL is secreted at high levels in the blood and urine within two hours of injury.
- IMA - Ischemic Modified Albumin. IMA can be used as an early biomarker for ischemic injury. Moreover, the amount of IMA in the blood is proportional to the duration of ischemic injury and necrosis factor, as such it can be used as a biomarker to determine how long the injury has been.
- TIMP-2 and IGFBP7. In the distal tubular regions, there is an elevation of the expression of TIMP2 and IGFBP7 and this is linked to early tubular damage in ischemic injury and reperfusion, as well as acute kidney injury.

=== Imaging Tests ===
==== Duplex Doppler Sonography ====
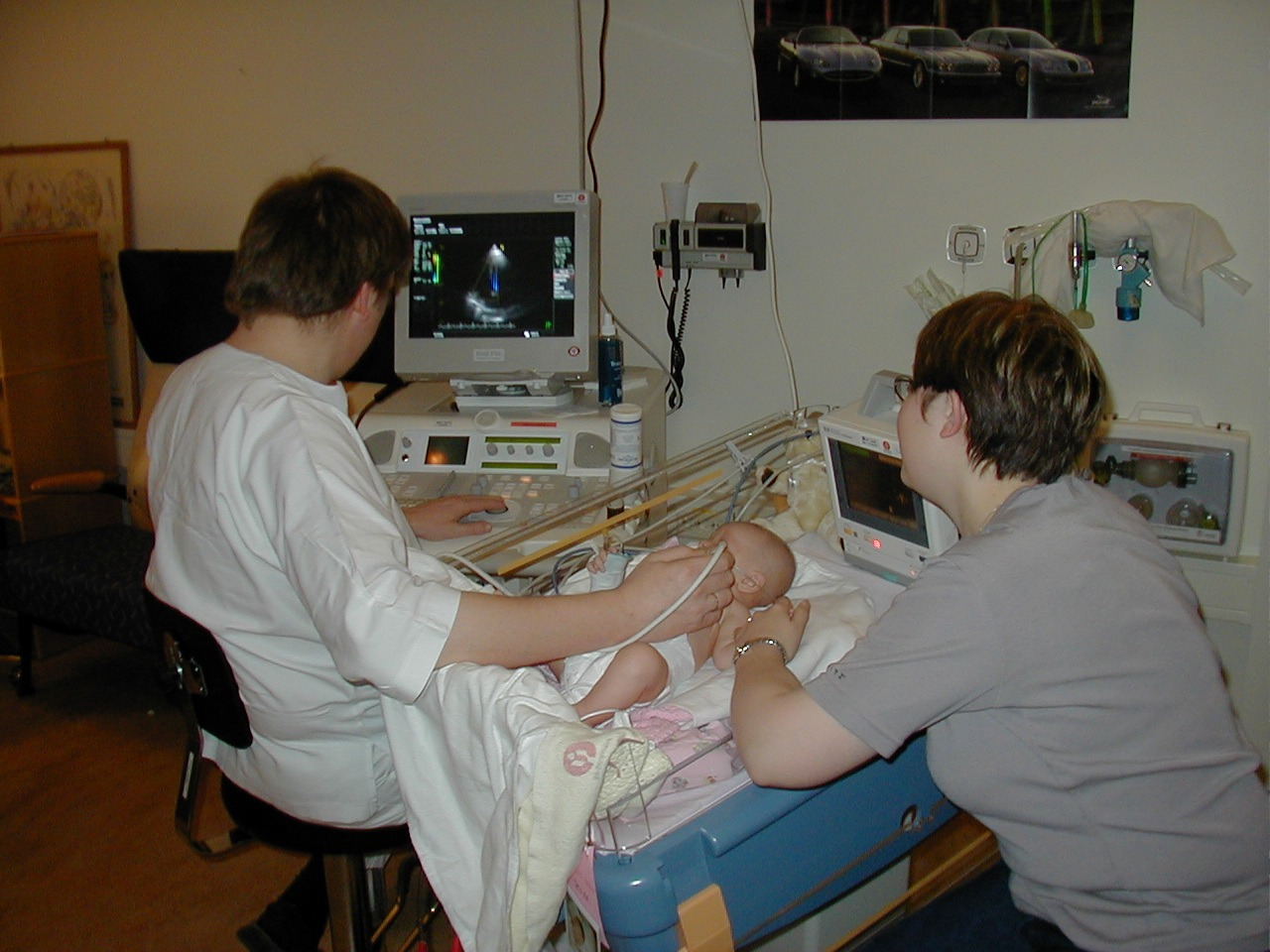
Sonography example

Duplex Doppler Sonography(DDS) is an imaging test for evaluating blood flow in the kidney or the renal system. B-mode ultrasonography is combined with Doppler ultrasonography, to locate and assess the renal artery and the velocity of blood flowing through it. This test is useful even in the presence of azotemia and for patients with hypertension, it is not necessary to relieve the administration of ACEIs. By assessing the velocity of blood flow, the doctors can measure whether the kidney is receiving enough blood and nutrients to function normally.

==== Magnetic Resonance Angiography ====
Assessment of the kidneys magnetic resonance angiography in perfusion and diffusion

Similar to DDS, Magnetic Resonance Angiography(MRA) also images blood vessels. MRA uses magnetic resonance and unlike a traditional angiogram, this does not require inserting a catheter. This test can be used to evaluate stenosis and occlusions in the kidney. This test can also be used to determine aneurysms in the brain. More clinical uses of MRA is used to check blood vessels in different parts of the body, such as the thorax, lower limbs, and the heart.

=== Functional Tests ===
==== Plasma renin activity ====
Plasma renin activity is also known as renin assay. This assay measures the activity of renin, also known as angiotensinogenase, which plays a role in blood pressure regulation and urine output. This is considered a non-invasive test and patients who are taking ACEIs should opt to take it. This is because it is useful in detecting renovascular hypertension, one of the symptoms of kidney ischemia, with sensitivity going to 90%. However, renal failure may diminish the accuracy of this test.

==== Renography after administration of ACEI ====
Renography uses radioisotopes in diagnosing renovascular disease. This test compares normal function of kidney versus stenotic kidney by measuring the amount of the radionucleotides going to the kidney and being excreted by it. Two radionuclides are used in renography: Tc99m-MAG3 (mercaptoacetyltriglycine) and TC99m-DTPA (diethylenetriaminepentacetate). In this test, the radionucleotides are injected intravenously to the system. The compound then progresses through the renal system and is tracked with a gamma camera. The camera then takes images at intervals and a measurement of the radioactivity is taken. By performing this scan, doctors can differentiate between kidney ischemia and intrinsic renal disease by checking the amount of time for the radioactivity to peak and decline. Renovascular hypertension is very sensitive to this imaging, with a specificity of 95% and sensitivity of 96%.

== Treatments ==
=== Traditional Treatments ===
Our knowledge of renal ischemia comes from animal studies. Based on these studies, kidney transplants and retrospective partial nephrectomy series indicate the risk of renal function impairment the longer the ischemic injury persists. However, based on historical studies, the use of the duration of the ischemia as a dichotomous marker has been found to have significant flaws in predicting renal function outcomes. The duration of kidney ischemia does not affect kidney function either in the short term or long term.

==== Ischemic Preconditioning ====
In patients who get a kidney transplant or a coronary artery bypass, ischemic preconditioning is given. In ischemic preconditioning, the kidney is given a tolerable amount of ischemia. This preconditions the kidney to tolerate subsequent ischemia-induced injuries. This reduces cell lysis and apoptosis of kidney cells and improves the overall renal function of the kidneys post-ischemia as compared to not having the preconditioning.

==== Furosemide to Promote Post-perfusion Diuresis ====
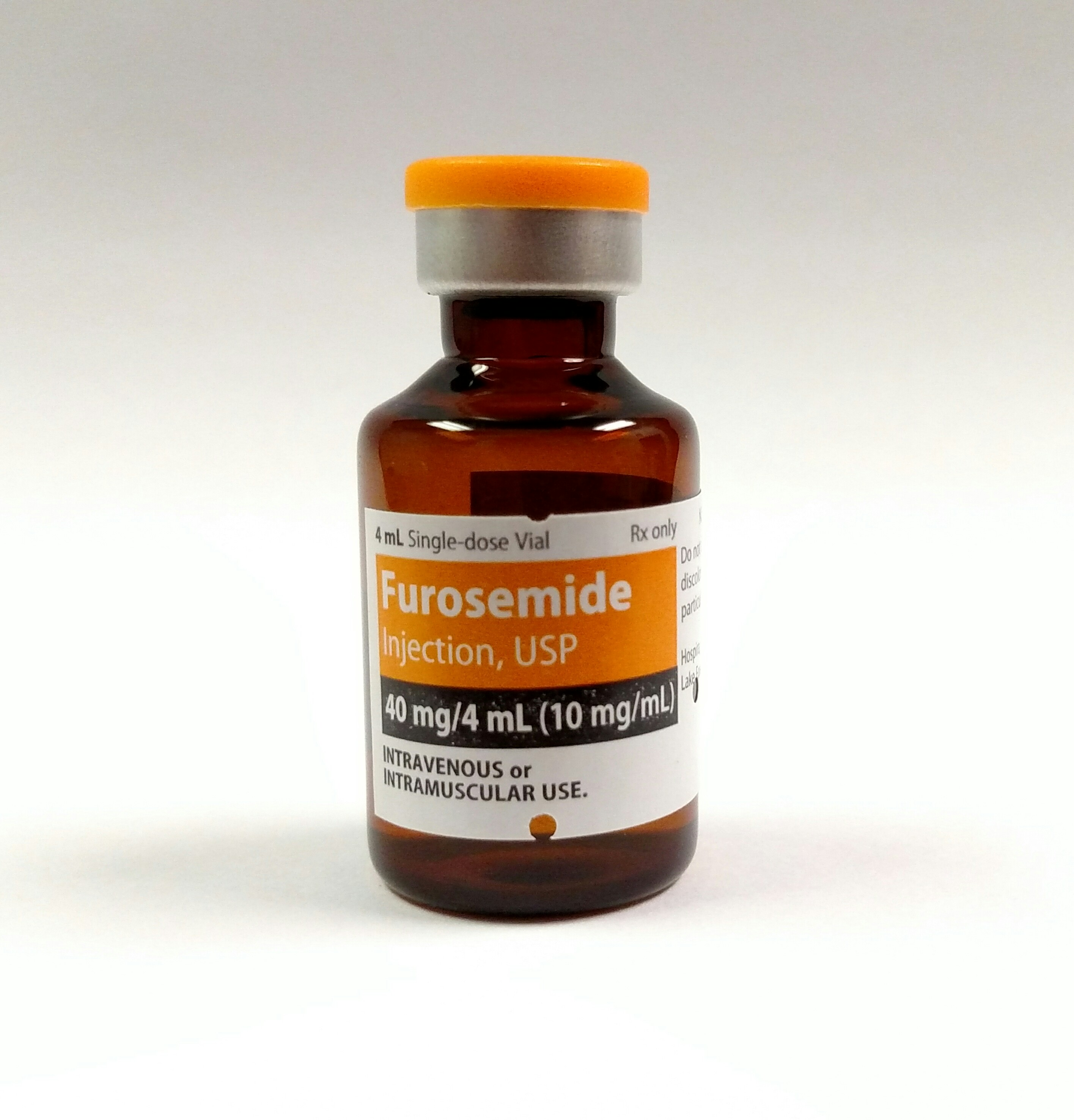
A vial of furosemide taken intravenously or intramuscularly

Furosemide is a common diuretic and is used for the prevention or to reverse acute kidney injury. A diuretic is a substance that promotes excretion of water from the body. When the kidneys undergo ischemia, it leads to reperfusion or a return of blood supply to the organs. As such, using diuretics has helped in getting rid of excess water in the kidneys after reperfusion. Taking furosemide as a tablet, as a liquid solution, or via injection is used as a preventative measure or as treatment of kidney ischemia has shown to reduce the severity of renal failure, reduce apoptosis induced by ischemia, and speed the recovery of renal function. This as also lead to the reduction of the need of surgical renal replacement in some patients.

==== Fenoldopam Mesylate ====
Fenoldopam is used postoperatively in treating Acute Kidney Injury, if used before kidney damage. Similar to Furosemide, this can be taken orally or intravenously; however, bioavailability, or the amount of the drug that reaches the blood circulation, is reduced if taken orally. Fenoldopam is used as a vasodilator and can increase blood flow to the kidneys, as well as renin secretion. Thus, it can be used to regulate the blood pressure in the arteries and reduce injury due to ischemia.

=== Emerging Treatments ===
==== Bendavia ====
Bendavia is currently in clinical studies targeting mitochondrial dysfunction. It is protective in rat models of kidney ischemia when it was administered before the injury. Bendavia binds to cardiolipin on the inner mitochondrial membrane and this inhibits cytochrome c peroxidase activity. This protects respiration during the early reperfusion and accelerates the recovery of ATP. In the animal models, it was found that tubular cell death and dysfunction were reduced.

==== Therapeutic Gases: CO, NO, and H2S ====
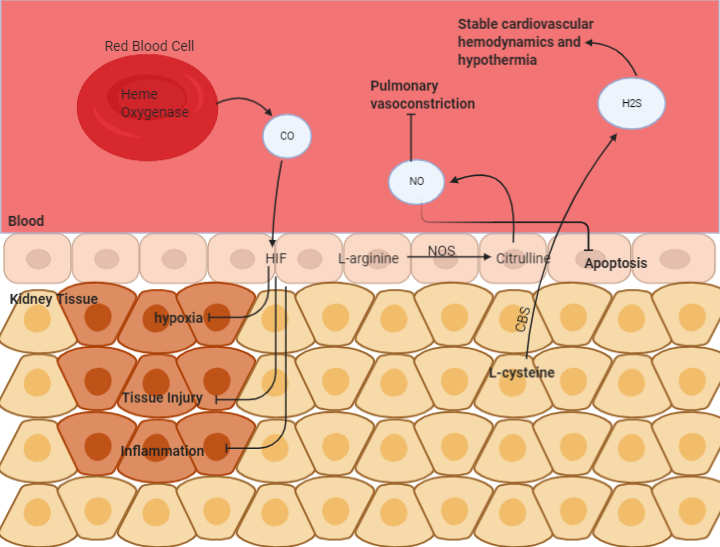
This figure shows how carbon monoxide, nitric oxide, and hydrogen sulfide help in attenuating kidney ischemia by reducing inflammation, tissue injury, hypoxia, apoptosis of cells, and vasoconstriction.

Carbon monoxide (CO) helps in stabilizing HIF, which helps in regulating autophagy and hypoxic response. Through this, inflammation and tissue injury are stabilized. Nitric Oxide (NO) is a byproduct of the metabolism of arginine to citrulline by NO synthase. This gas is available in all cells, and inhalation of NO has been found to be therapeutically active. This reduces pulmonary vasoconstriction and lessens apoptosis during renal ischemia. Hydrogen Sulfide (H2S) is also an endogenous product of metabolic activity in cells. This is a byproduct of the metabolism of cysteine by cystathionine-b-synthase. Like with NO, inhalation of H2S has been found to be therapeutic and has been shown to stabilize hypothermia and stabilize cardiovascular hemodynamics which protects from ischemic injury.

==== Mesenchymal Stem Cell ====
Mesenchymal Stem Cells (MSCs) are multipotent mature stem cells that are capable of differentiating into different types of cells. This is a promising line of therapy as regenerative medicine has shown benefits in the restoration of the kidneys. MSCs have anti-inflammatory properties and has been applied in animal and human patients. Because of their regenerative capabilities, the kidney can benefit from it by transdifferentiation into kidney cells. Moreover, they can give anti-inflammatory and immuno-modulatory properties and therefore protecting the kidney as well as repairing it from ischemic injury.

== Outcome ==
Ischemic kidney injury might result in fibrosis, irreversible renal dysfunction, and a need for renal replacement therapy. Acute kidney ischemia is associated with high mortality. Chronic ischemic kidney disease (CIKD) usually involves loss of renal parenchyma or reduction of GFR caused by gradual vascular obstruction. Clinically, the term "ischemic renal disease" most often describes CIKD, which contributes to 6–27% of end-stage kidney disease, particularly among patients older than 50 years
