= Renal stem cell =

Details
- Precursor: Metanephric blastema
- Location: Kidney
- Function: Stem cell

Identifiers
- Latin: ansa nephroni

Renal stem cells are self-renewing, multipotent stem cells which are able to give rise to all the cell types of the kidney. It is involved in the homeostasis and repair of the kidney, and holds therapeutic potential for treatment of kidney failure.

== Structure ==
Strong evidence suggests that renal stem cells are located in the renal papilla. Using stain-retaining assay (with bromodeoxyuridine, or BrdU), a low-cycling cell population was found in the papillary region, which was able to divide rapidly to repair the damage caused by transcient renal ischemia. These cells are able to incorporate into other renal tissues, and was able to repeatedly form spheres in 3D cultures, and clonal analysis also exhibited its multipotency.

Other reports have suggested the renal tubule and renal capsule to be the site of stem cells. The renal capsule contain stain-retaining cells which exhibited markers for mesenchymal stem cells; after their removal, recovery was significantly slower post-ischemic injury. These evidence suggests a stem cell population exists within the renal capsule.

=== Development ===
Using in vivo lineage tracing techniques, Lgr5^{+} cells were found to contribute to the nephron, specifically to the ascending limb of the loop of Henle and the distal convoluted tubule. Thus, Lgr5^{+} cells can potentially be a marker for renal stem and/or progenitor cells.

== Clinical significance ==
There is much debate regarding the cells involved in repair after injury; while some suggests that stem cells are the sole driving force of repair, others suggests that cells dedifferentiate after damage to act like stem cells. Alternately, it was also reported that differentiated tubular epithelial cells are the driving mechanism for regeneration after injury, using proliferative expansion as the mechanism.

Multipotent mouse kidney progenitor cells (MKPC) were obtained from Myh9 targeted mutant mice. Injection of MKPC into mice post-ischemic injury saw the MKPC regenerating different cell lineages and was able to regenerate renal function and enhanced survival.

=== Renal induced pluripotent stem cells ===
It has been reported that endogenous kidney tubular renal epithelial cells can be dedifferentiated into induced pluripotent stem cells by the treatment of only two factors - Oct4 and Sox2.

== See also ==
- List of human cell types derived from the germ layers
