= Cytochrome b-245, alpha polypeptide =

Protein-coding gene in the species Homo sapiens

CYBA
Available structures
PDB	Ortholog search: PDBe RCSB
PDB	List of PDB id codes 1WLP

Identifiers
- Aliases: CYBA, p22-PHOX, Cytochrome b-245, alpha polypeptide, cytochrome b-245 alpha chain, CGD4
- External IDs: OMIM: 608508; MGI: 1316658; HomoloGene: 80; GeneCards: CYBA; OMA:CYBA - orthologs

Gene location (Human)
Chr.	Chromosome 16 (human)
Band	16q24.2	Start	88,643,275 bp
Band	16q24.2	End	88,651,083 bp

Gene location (Mouse)
Chr.	Chromosome 8 (mouse)
Band	8|8 E1	Start	123,151,515 bp
Band	8|8 E1	End	123,159,669 bp
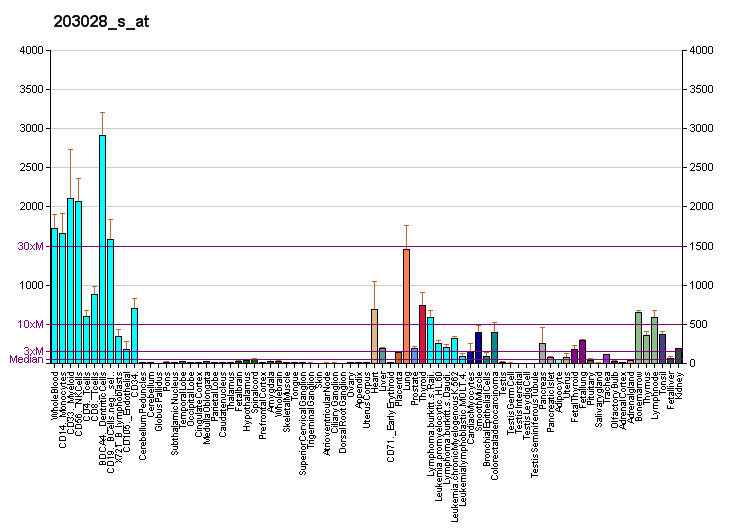
RNA expression pattern
Bgee	Human / Mouse (ortholog); Top expressed in: granulocyte; monocyte; mucosa of transverse colon; spleen; bone marrow; right lung; right uterine tube; upper lobe of left lung; bone marrow cell; olfactory zone of nasal mucosa / Top expressed in: granulocyte; right kidney; mesenteric lymph nodes; human kidney; tibiofemoral joint; spleen; stroma of bone marrow; yolk sac; proximal tubule; thymus; More reference expression data
BioGPS	More reference expression data
Gene ontology
Molecular function	SH3 domain binding; metal ion binding; protein binding; heme binding; protein heterodimerization activity; electron transfer activity; oxidoreductase activity; superoxide-generating NAD(P)H oxidase activity
Cellular component	cytoplasm; endosome; phagocytic vesicle membrane; Golgi apparatus; membrane; plasma membrane; perinuclear endoplasmic reticulum; secretory granule; soma; NADPH oxidase complex; dendrite; apical plasma membrane; mitochondrion; nucleus; endoplasmic reticulum membrane; stress fiber; focal adhesion; specific granule membrane; tertiary granule membrane
Biological process	positive regulation of reactive oxygen species biosynthetic process; cellular response to organic substance; positive regulation of phagocytosis; cytochrome complex assembly; response to interleukin-1; positive regulation of endothelial cell proliferation; antigen processing and presentation of exogenous peptide antigen via MHC class I, TAP-dependent; regulation of release of sequestered calcium ion into cytosol; cellular response to tumor necrosis factor; cellular response to organic cyclic compound; negative regulation of glomerular filtration by angiotensin; smooth muscle hypertrophy; positive regulation of defense response to bacterium; cell redox homeostasis; reactive oxygen species metabolic process; superoxide anion generation; respiratory burst; regulation of blood pressure; cellular response to mechanical stimulus; positive regulation of cell growth; vascular endothelial growth factor receptor signaling pathway; response to nutrient levels; cellular response to gamma radiation; positive regulation of interleukin-6 production; positive regulation of tumor necrosis factor production; cellular response to amino acid stimulus; hydrogen peroxide biosynthetic process; positive regulation of toll-like receptor 2 signaling pathway; positive regulation of superoxide anion generation; innate immune response; inflammatory response; positive regulation of mucus secretion; cellular response to glucose stimulus; superoxide metabolic process; positive regulation of smooth muscle cell proliferation; response to aldosterone; positive regulation of NAD(P)H oxidase activity; cellular response to L-glutamine; response to hypoxia; cellular response to angiotensin; response to activity; neutrophil degranulation; cellular response to oxidative stress; electron transport chain; positive regulation of blood pressure
Sources:Amigo / QuickGO
Orthologs
Species	Human	Mouse
Entrez	1535	13057
Ensembl	ENSG00000051523	ENSMUSG00000006519
UniProt	P13498	Q61462
RefSeq (mRNA)	NM_000101	NM_001301284; NM_007806
RefSeq (protein)	NP_000092	NP_001288213; NP_031832
Location (UCSC)	Chr 16: 88.64 – 88.65 Mb	Chr 8: 123.15 – 123.16 Mb
PubMed search
- Wikidata
View/Edit Human	View/Edit Mouse

Cytochrome b-245 light chain is a protein that in humans is encoded by the CYBA gene involved in superoxide production and phagocytosis.

Cytochrome b-245 is composed of a light chain (alpha) and a heavy chain (beta). This gene encodes the light, alpha subunit, which has been proposed as a primary component of the microbicidal oxidase system of phagocytes. Mutations in this gene are associated with autosomal recessive chronic granulomatous disease (CGD), which is characterized by the failure of activated phagocytes to generate superoxide, which is important for the microbicidal activity of these cells.

== Discovery ==
The p22phox protein (phox for phagocytic oxidase) was first identified in 1987 during the purification of the cytochrome b-245mv from human neutrophils. A few years before, this low-potential cytochrome b, also called cytochrome b558 (cytb) because of its spectral properties, was demonstrated as the major component of the microbicidal nicotinamide adenine dinucleotide phosphate (NADPH) oxidase complex in phagocytes. Cytb, the redox element of the NADPH oxidase complex, is a membrane heterodimer composed of two subunits: p22phox (also called the alpha or small subunit or the light chain of the cytb) and gp91phox (renamed NOX2 in the 2000s) or the beta or heavy chain or large subunit. By screening a cDNA library constructed from human promyelocytic leukemia cells, Parkos et al. isolated a cDNA corresponding to the light chain of cytb. The importance of the role of p22phox was evidenced by the discovery of autosomal recessive chronic granulomatous disease caused by mutations in CYBA and leading to the absence of cytb expression in phagocytes.

== Gene ==
The human CYBA gene (OMIM number 233690) encoding the p22phox protein is located on the long arm of chromosome 16 at position 24 (16q24: 88,643,288 to 88,651,084, OMIM 608508), containing 6 exons, 5 introns and spanning 8.5kb (Fig. 1). An update of the promoter region of CYBA contains TATA, CCAC boxes, Sp1, -interferon, and nuclear factor B sites. The p22phox cDNA was also cloned in rat vascular smooth muscle cells (VSMCs) and showed that the rat gene was homologous to both human and mouse genes. P22phox human mRNA is 0.8 kb and has a constitutive expression in a variety of cell types. P22phox expression is not related to the NOX2 transcript expression, suggesting that both subunits have an independent transcription process.

== Protein structure and function ==
P22phox is a transmembrane protein that contains 195 amino acids and that has a molecular mass of 22.0 kDa. It associates with NOX2 and with NOX1, NOX3 and NOX4 in a 1:1 complex and has a ubiquitous expression. The main physiological role of p22phox is to contribute to the maturation and the stabilization of the heterodimer that it forms with NOX enzymes (NOX1–4) in order to produce reactive oxygen species (ROS). Association of NOXs with p22phox in the late endoplasmic reticulum seems to be a prerequisite for the localization of the heterodimer to specific membrane compartments such as perinuclear vesicles for NOX4 and plasma membranes in the case of NOX1, 2 and 3. The importance of some sequences of p22phox for its interaction with NOXs has been highlighted. The hydropathic profile of p22phox deduced from the gene sequence is compatible with at least two (possibly three or four) transmembrane passages. However, the most probable are the two or four transmembrane-spanning models because they are compatible with a cytosolic location of both the N- and the C-terminal tail of p22phox. A polyproline-rich region (PRR) (K149 to E162 sequence) in the C-terminus of p22phox contains a consensus motif PxxP that interacts with the SH3 (SRC homology 3) domains of p47phox during NADPH oxidase assembly in phagocytes. This PRR-rich sequence also interacts with the cytosolic organizer NOXO1 homologs to p47phox expressed in nonphagocytic cells, during the activation of NADPH oxidases (NOX1, NOX2 and NOX3), except for NOX4, which is constitutively expressed. Phosphorylation of Thr147 close to the PRR region of p22phox enhances NADPH oxidase activity by promoting p47phox binding in phagocytes. ROSs generated by NOX2-p22phox (or cytb) in the phagocytes are microbicide and are able to kill microorganisms during infections. P22phox associated with NOX2 is also found in brain and especially in microglia. Anarchic ROS production by these cells is involved in the pathological process of degenerative diseases. P22phox can be associated with NOX1, NOX3 and NOX4 in several cells and tissues, but the level of ROS production is far lower than those produced in phagocytes by cytb. In this case ROSs are considered as signaling messengers rather than toxic products. Excessive ROS generation by NOX enzymes has been linked to a range of diseases including cardiovascular diseases such as atherosclerosis and hypertension, diabetes, neurodegenerative disease and ischemia/reperfusion injury. NOX1, NOX2 and NOX4, which require p22phox to be functional, are important contributors of ROS in tissues and especially vascular cells. Therefore, the variability of ROS production by NOXs could influence the risk of such diseases, although increased oxidative stress by p22phox overexpression has not been functionally characterized or attributed to a particular NOX family member.

== Clinical relevance of mutations ==
Mutations in CYBA or CYBB, encoding p22phox or NOX2, respectively, lead to Chronic granulomatous disease because of the absence of cytb in both cases. This means that the synthesis of both subunits is essential for the maturation of cytb. CGD is a rare inherited disorder in which phagocytic cells are unable to kill pathogens during an infection. Patients suffer from severe and recurrent infections early in childhood. Actually, the main treatment is antibiotic and antifungal prophylaxis. Allogenic bone marrow transplantation is possible and genetic therapy is currently under development. The most frequent CGD form is X-linked CGD caused by mutations in CYBB (60% of cases). Mutations in the CYBA gene encoding p22phox are extremely rare (about 6%) and lead to AR-CGD220. However, in countries such as Turkey, Tunisia, Morocco and Jordan AR inheritance can be the predominant form because of the high rate of consanguinity. As of 2010, 55 different mutations of CYBA have been identified. Most CYBA mutations result in the absence of p22phox expression (AR-CGD220). The only missense mutation leading to a normal expression of a nonfunctional p22phox protein is Pro156Gln (AR-CGD22+) located in the potential cytosolic C-terminal tail of p22phox. This mutation in the PRR of p22phox disrupted the interaction between p22phox and p47phox, confirming the importance of this domain in the oxidase activation in neutrophils. Since p22phox is ubiquitous and associated with different NOXs, it could be logical that CGD patients suffer from the consequences of the absence of p22phox expression in tissues. However it is far from being evident. One possibility could be that the humans may be able to compensate for the absence of p22phox and/or NOXs in cells and tissues other than phagocytes. Given the rarity of the AR-CGD220 forms, information on the severity of this type of CGD is difficult to establish. A relationship between the presence of residual ROS production and the survival of CGD patients has been found. In case of CYBA mutations leading to the absence of p22phox, NOX2 expression is also absent and disables cytochrome b558, the redox element of the NADPH oxidase complex. Therefore, these mutations behave similarly to severe X-CGD. The molecular and phenotypic characterization of a p22phox-deficient mouse strain with the Tyr121His missense mutation in CYBA has been described. The p22phox deficiency results in the clinical and biological characteristics of CGD as well as a severe balance disorder in these mice. As the site of p22phox expression is in the inner ear, p22phox has been proposed as being involved in the control of vestibular organogenesis. In addition, mutations of NOX3 in head-tilt mice were associated with vestibular defects. Yet the in vivo relevance of p22phox for NOX3 function remains uncertain because AR-CGD220 patients do not suffer from vestibular dysfunction (personal data). One possibility could be that the human brain may be able to compensate the balance defect. In Matsumoto Eosinophilia Shinshu (MES) rats a loss-of-function mutation in CYBA was responsible for spontaneous and severe blood eosinophilia. These rats suffered from a balance defect due to a leak of otoconia in the inner ear, like nmf333 mice. In addition, MES rats retained normal innate immune defense against Staphylococcus aureus infection probably because of the hypereosinophilia. However, the mechanisms by which CYBA mutations lead to eosinophilia remain unknown.

== Clinical relevance of single-nucleotide polymorphisms ==
Contrary to CYBB, CYBA supports a relatively high number of single-nucleotide polymorphisms (SNPs) that could influence the level of ROS generation. These SNPs were mainly associated with cardiovascular diseases such as hypertension, coronary artery disease (CAD), coronary heart disease (CHD) and also cerebral ischemic diseases. The first and most widely studied is the C242T polymorphism is located in exon 4 at position 214 from the ATG and resulting in a non conservative His72 substitution for a Tyr. Inoue et al. first found that the T allele of the C242 polymorphism might have a protective effect against CAD. Despite some evidence of the effect of this polymorphism on ROS generation at the cellular level, the association of the CYBA C242T polymorphism with cardiovascular diseases has been widely reported but with conflicting results. Single SNP analysis may explain the discrepancies among CYBA association studies. A global approach such as haplotype analysis is probably a better approach to understand the impact of CYBA genetic variability on diseases. CYBA variants together with polymorphism analysis of lipid metabolism or stress oxidant pathway genes are of great interest as well. However, for future investigations regarding the effect of these polymorphisms, it is crucial that the number of patients under study provide sufficient statistical power. In addition, genetics studies that include control of external factors should be extremely informative. Finally, since 2010 nine Chinese meta-analyses of the C242T polymorphism have been published in relation with CAD, hypertension atherosclerosis or diabetes and its complications and ischemic cerebrovascular diseases. The results from these meta-analyses were controversial. Several factors could influence these data: the search strategy, the identification of relevant studies (publication bias), the statistical analysis including a sufficient sampling, the prevalence of the studied polymorphism in the studied population [minor allele frequency (MAF)] and the type of population (population-based or not, for example). Results of these meta-analyses need to be confirmed with larger samples. In addition, a meta-analysis based on genome-wide association study data will be of great interest in the future.
