= Cytochrome b-245 =

Protein complex

The Cytochrome b (-245) protein complex is composed of cytochrome b alpha (CYBA) and beta (CYBB) chain.
