= NOX5 =

Protein-coding gene in the species Homo sapiens

Identifiers
- Aliases: NOX5, NADPH oxidase 5
- External IDs: OMIM: 606572; GeneCards: NOX5

Gene location (Human)
Chr.	Chromosome 15 (human)
Band	15q23	Start	68,930,525 bp
Band	15q23	End	69,062,762 bp
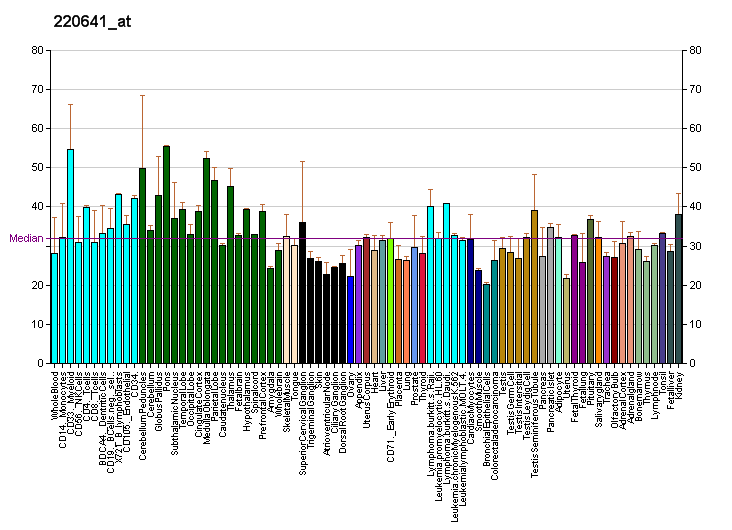
RNA expression pattern
Bgee	Human / Mouse (ortholog); Top expressed in: oocyte; thymus; spleen; secondary oocyte; muscle tissue; testicle; right testis; left testis; metanephros; placenta / n/a; More reference expression data
BioGPS	More reference expression data
Gene ontology
Molecular function	metal ion binding; proton channel activity; calcium ion binding; heme binding; oxidoreductase activity; flavin adenine dinucleotide binding; NADP binding; protein binding; superoxide-generating NAD(P)H oxidase activity
Cellular component	integral component of membrane; membrane; endoplasmic reticulum; endoplasmic reticulum membrane; plasma membrane; NADPH oxidase complex
Biological process	angiogenesis; superoxide anion generation; positive regulation of reactive oxygen species metabolic process; regulation of fusion of sperm to egg plasma membrane; apoptotic process; ion transport; regulation of proton transport; cell population proliferation; endothelial cell proliferation; cellular response to oxidative stress; proton transmembrane transport; cytoskeleton-dependent cytokinesis; defense response
Sources:Amigo / QuickGO
Orthologs
Databases	NCBI: entry; OMA: entry
Species	Human	Mouse
Entrez	79400	n/a
Ensembl	ENSG00000255346	n/a
UniProt	Q96PH1	n/a
RefSeq (mRNA)	NM_001184779; NM_001184780; NM_024505	n/a
RefSeq (protein)	NP_001171708; NP_001171709; NP_078781	n/a
Location (UCSC)	Chr 15: 68.93 – 69.06 Mb	n/a
PubMed search		n/a
- Wikidata
View/Edit Human

NADPH oxidase, EF-hand calcium binding domain 5, also known as NOX5, is a protein which in humans is encoded by the NOX5 gene.

== Function ==
NOX5 is a novel NADPH oxidase that generates superoxide.

Nox5 interacts with c-abl, superoxide production leads to phosphorylation of c-abl, while inhibition of c-abl kinase activity inhibits Nox5 superoxide production.
