= NOX3 =

Protein-coding gene in the species Homo sapiens

Identifiers
- Aliases: NOX3, GP91-3, MOX-2, NADPH oxidase 3
- External IDs: OMIM: 607105; MGI: 2681162; GeneCards: NOX3

Gene location (Human)
| Chr. | Chromosome 6 (human) |
| Band | 6q25.3 | Start | 155,395,368 bp |
| Band | 6q25.3 | End | 155,455,839 bp |

Gene location (Mouse)
| Chr. | Chromosome 17 (mouse) |
| Band | 17 A1|17 2.05 cM | Start | 3,685,515 bp |
| Band | 17 A1|17 2.05 cM | End | 3,746,536 bp |
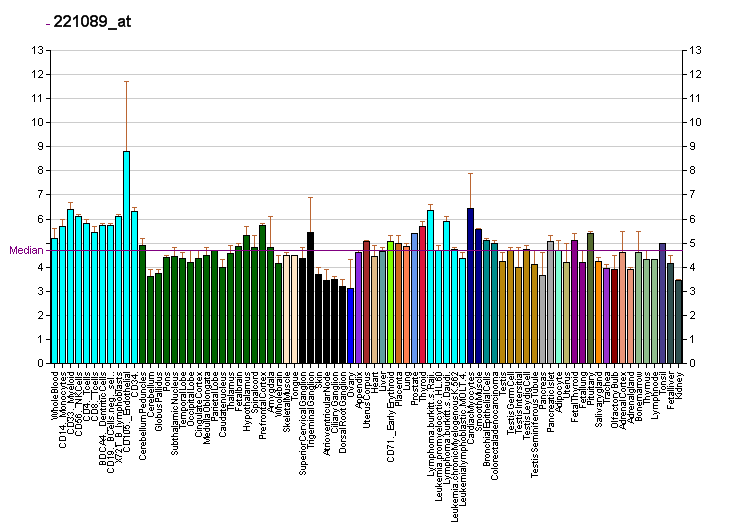
RNA expression pattern
| Bgee | Human / Mouse (ortholog); Top expressed in: Cortex of frontal lobe; hippocampus proper; right frontal lobe / Top expressed in: spermatid; testicle; More reference expression data |
| BioGPS | More reference expression data |
Gene ontology
| Molecular function | oxidoreductase activity; superoxide-generating NAD(P)H oxidase activity |
| Cellular component | cytoplasm; integral component of membrane; plasma membrane; NADPH oxidase complex; extracellular exosome; membrane |
| Biological process | response to gravity; temperature homeostasis; detection of gravity; otolith development; superoxide anion generation; defense response |
Sources:Amigo / QuickGO
Orthologs
| Databases | NCBI: entry; OMA: entry |
| Species | Human | Mouse |
| Entrez | 50508 | 224480 |
| Ensembl | ENSG00000074771 | ENSMUSG00000023802 |
| UniProt | Q9HBY0 | Q672J9 |
| RefSeq (mRNA) | NM_015718 | NM_198958 |
| RefSeq (protein) | NP_056533 | NP_945196 |
| Location (UCSC) | Chr 6: 155.4 – 155.46 Mb | Chr 17: 3.69 – 3.75 Mb |
| PubMed search |
- Wikidata
| View/Edit Human | View/Edit Mouse |

NADPH oxidase 3 is an enzyme that in humans is encoded by the NOX3 gene.

== Function ==
NADPH oxidases, such as NOX3, are plasma membrane-associated enzymes found in many cell types. They catalyze the production of superoxide by a one-electron reduction of oxygen, using NADPH as the electron donor.[supplied by OMIM]
