= P22phox =

p22phox Protein, also known as the human neutrophil cytochrome b light chain (CYBA), is an essential component of the membrane-associated enzyme phagocyte NADPH-oxidase This enzyme uses NADH or NADPH as the electron donor for the one electron reduction of oxygen to produce superoxide anion, a reactive oxygen species (ROS), and a functionally important step for the antimicrobial activity of phagocytic cells. p22phox is also expressed in many other human cells such as endothelial and vascular smooth muscle cells, including those within the coronary arteries. Specific polymorphisms of the CYBA gene have been identified that are associated with a decreased risk of coronary artery disease (CAD).

== Protein structure and gene function ==
Cytochrome b is a heterodimer of two glycoproteins, gp91phox (also known as the heavy or β chain) and p22phox (the light or α chain). The heavy and light chains are closely associated in phagocytic cells, but while the expression of gp91phox is restricted to these cells, p22phox has been detected in many other cell types and is able to function as a component of NAD(P)H oxidases. The alpha chain CYBA gene is located on chromosome 16q24 and consists of 6 exons and 5 introns, with a total length of 8.5kb.

== Genetic polymorphisms and link to coronary artery disease ==
Oxidative stress in the vasculature induced by ROS (particularly the superoxide anion) via the NAD(P)H oxidase pathway causes vascular wall remodeling and endothelial dysfunction, consistent with the initial pathogenesis of vascular diseases such as atherosclerosis and CAD. Genetic alterations in the CYBA gene have been reported that interrupt this pathway in the vasculature, including the C242T and A640G polymorphisms.

The C242T polymorphism occurs in exon 4 and results in a histidine to tyrosine amino acid substitution in the p22phox protein. This leads to reduced NAD(P)H oxidase activity in human blood vessels and therefore a decreased production of ROS and vascular oxidative stress. A 2014 meta-analysis indicated a protective role of this polymorphism for CAD in an Asian population due to reduced NAD(P)H oxidase activity. Functional studies have further shown that the C242T variant is associated with lower superoxide production in human blood vessels, independent of established atherosclerosis risk factors. Associations between the p22phox C242T polymorphism and other vascular diseases have also been investigated. Pooled analyses have examined its relationship with ischemic cerebrovascular disease, with results varying by population and disease subtype.

The A640G polymorphism is located in the 3' untranslated region (UTR) of the CYBA gene and does not cause an amino acid substitution, however it has still been shown to have an effect on ROS generation. Although this variation has been less extensively studied, it has also been linked to a decreased risk of CAD, possibly due to decreased translational activity of the CYBA gene. Specific mechanisms of this particular polymorphism are currently under investigation.
