= NOX4 =

Protein-coding gene in the species Homo sapiens

Identifiers
- Aliases: NOX4, KOX, KOX-1, RENOX, NADPH oxidase 4
- External IDs: OMIM: 605261; MGI: 1354184; GeneCards: NOX4
Enzyme activity
EC #	BRENDA	ExPASy	KEGG	MetaCyc
1.6.3.1	↗	↗	↗	↗

Gene location (Human)
Chr.	Chromosome 11 (human)
Band	11q14.3	Start	89,324,353 bp
Band	11q14.3	End	89,498,187 bp

Gene location (Mouse)
Chr.	Chromosome 7 (mouse)
Band	7|7 D3	Start	86,895,304 bp
Band	7|7 D3	End	87,047,918 bp
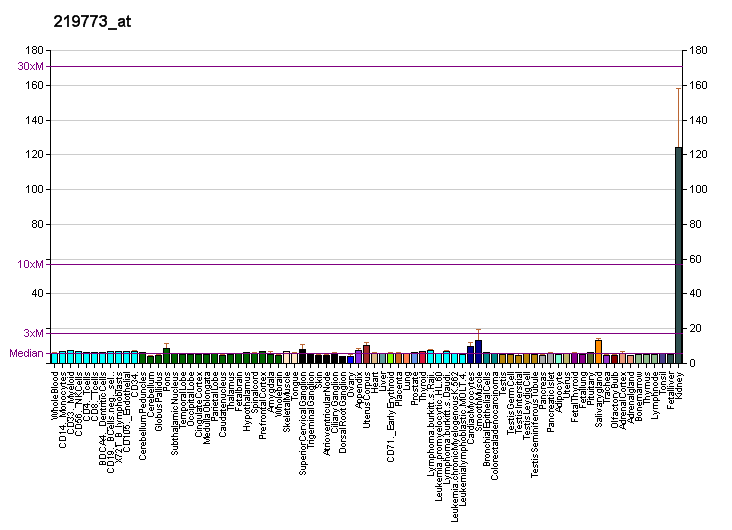
RNA expression pattern
Bgee	Human / Mouse (ortholog); Top expressed in: Achilles tendon; kidney tubule; glomerulus; metanephric glomerulus; ascending aorta; human kidney; Descending thoracic aorta; pericardium; popliteal artery; tibial arteries / Top expressed in: human kidney; tunica media of zone of aorta; right kidney; lumbar spinal ganglion; epithelium of small intestine; left lobe of liver; ascending aorta; carotid body; aortic valve; renal cortex; More reference expression data
BioGPS	More reference expression data
Gene ontology
Molecular function	nucleotide binding; NAD(P)H oxidase H2O2-forming activity; flavin adenine dinucleotide binding; oxidoreductase activity, acting on NAD(P)H, oxygen as acceptor; modified amino acid binding; protein binding; heme binding; electron transfer activity; oxidoreductase activity; oxygen gasoreceptor activity; superoxide-generating NAD(P)H oxidase activity; protein tyrosine kinase binding
Cellular component	integral component of membrane; membrane; focal adhesion; plasma membrane; stress fiber; cell junction; NADPH oxidase complex; nucleolus; apical plasma membrane; mitochondrion; endoplasmic reticulum; perinuclear region of cytoplasm; cell periphery; endoplasmic reticulum membrane; nucleus; perinuclear endoplasmic reticulum
Biological process	cellular response to transforming growth factor beta stimulus; positive regulation of protein kinase B signaling; response to hypoxia; gene expression; positive regulation of MAP kinase activity; cardiac muscle cell differentiation; ageing; bone resorption; reactive oxygen species metabolic process; superoxide anion generation; positive regulation of smooth muscle cell migration; positive regulation of reactive oxygen species metabolic process; cellular response to gamma radiation; cell morphogenesis; positive regulation of DNA biosynthetic process; positive regulation of ERK1 and ERK2 cascade; positive regulation of apoptotic process; homocysteine metabolic process; inflammatory response; positive regulation of stress fiber assembly; cellular response to cAMP; cellular response to glucose stimulus; superoxide metabolic process; negative regulation of cell population proliferation; cellular response to oxidative stress; electron transport chain; heart process; positive regulation of protein tyrosine kinase activity; reactive oxygen species biosynthetic process; defense response
Sources:Amigo / QuickGO
Orthologs
Databases	NCBI: entry; OMA: entry
Species	Human	Mouse
Entrez	50507	50490
Ensembl	ENSG00000086991	ENSMUSG00000030562
UniProt	Q9NPH5	Q9JHI8
RefSeq (mRNA)	NM_001143836; NM_001143837; NM_001291926; NM_001291927; NM_001291929 NM_001300995; NM_016931	NM_001285833; NM_001285835; NM_015760
RefSeq (protein)	NP_001137308; NP_001137309; NP_001278855; NP_001278856; NP_001278858 NP_001287924; NP_058627	NP_001272762; NP_001272764; NP_056575
Location (UCSC)	Chr 11: 89.32 – 89.5 Mb	Chr 7: 86.9 – 87.05 Mb
PubMed search
- Wikidata
View/Edit Human	View/Edit Mouse

NADPH oxidase 4 is an enzyme that in humans is encoded by the NOX4 gene, and is a member of the NOX family of NADPH oxidases.

== Function ==
Oxygen sensing is essential for homeostasis in all aerobic organisms. A phagocyte-type oxidase, similar to that responsible for the production of large amounts of reactive oxygen species (ROS) in neutrophil granulocytes, with resultant antimicrobial activity, has been postulated to function in the kidney as an oxygen sensor that regulates the synthesis of erythropoietin in the renal cortex.

Nox4 protects the vasculature against inflammatory stress. Nox-dependent reactive oxygen species modulation by amino endoperoxides can induce apoptosis in high Nox4-expressing cancer cells.

A study found that NOX4 facilitates certain beneficial adaptive responses to exercise mediated by ROS. Moreover, reductions in skeletal muscle NOX4 in aging and obesity was shown to contribute to the development of insulin resistance and may promote oxidative stress.
