= NOX2 =

Protein-coding gene in the species Homo sapiens

CYBB

Identifiers
- Aliases: CYBB, AMCBX2, CGD, GP91-1, GP91-PHOX, GP91PHOX, IMD34, NOX2, p91-PHOX, cytochrome b-245 beta chain, CGDX
- External IDs: OMIM: 300481; MGI: 88574; GeneCards: CYBB
Available structures
PDB	Ortholog search: PDBe RCSB
PDB	List of PDB id codes 3A1F

Gene location (Human)
Chr.	X chromosome (human)
Band	Xp21.1-p11.4	Start	37,780,018 bp
Band	Xp21.1-p11.4	End	37,813,461 bp

Gene location (Mouse)
Chr.	X chromosome (mouse)
Band	X|X A1.1	Start	9,301,491 bp
Band	X|X A1.1	End	9,354,010 bp
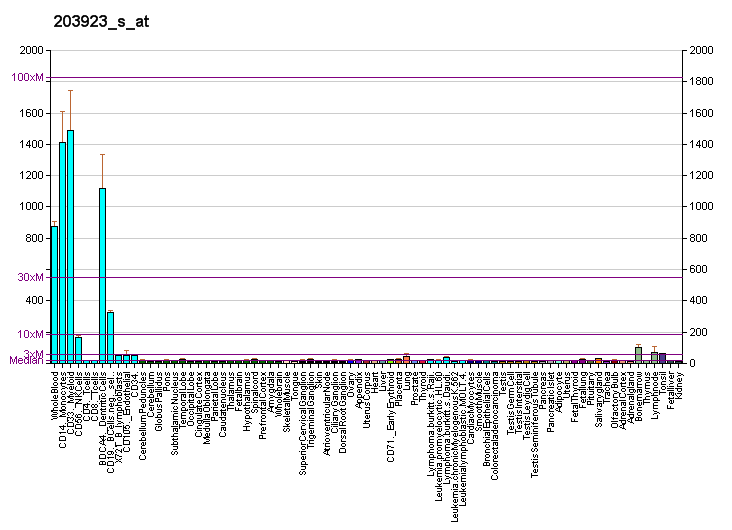

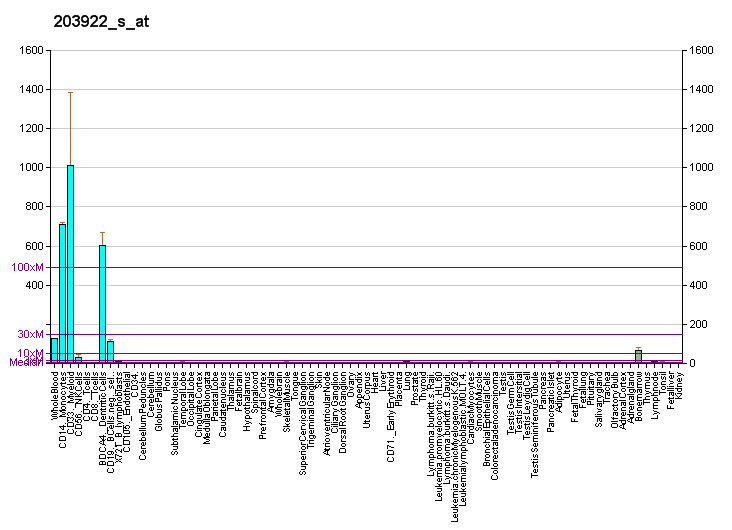
RNA expression pattern
Bgee	Human / Mouse (ortholog); Top expressed in: monocyte; granulocyte; bone marrow; bone marrow cell; synovial joint; blood; trabecular bone; appendix; lymph node; decidua / Top expressed in: granulocyte; stroma of bone marrow; mesenteric lymph nodes; right lung lobe; spleen; lumbar spinal ganglion; tibiofemoral joint; calvaria; blood; ankle; More reference expression data
BioGPS	More reference expression data
Gene ontology
Molecular function	flavin adenine dinucleotide binding; superoxide-generating NAD(P)H oxidase activity; metal ion binding; voltage-gated ion channel activity; protein binding; heme binding; protein heterodimerization activity; electron transfer activity; oxidoreductase activity
Cellular component	cytoplasm; integral component of membrane; phagocytic vesicle membrane; membrane; plasma membrane; integral component of plasma membrane; NADPH oxidase complex; perinuclear region of cytoplasm; phagocytic vesicle; Golgi apparatus; endoplasmic reticulum; soma; intracellular anatomical structure; endoplasmic reticulum membrane; rough endoplasmic reticulum; dendrite; nuclear envelope; specific granule membrane; tertiary granule membrane; perinuclear endoplasmic reticulum
Biological process	regulation of ion transmembrane transport; ion transport; superoxide anion generation; respiratory burst; vascular endothelial growth factor receptor signaling pathway; hydrogen peroxide biosynthetic process; innate immune response; inflammatory response; superoxide metabolic process; cellular response to L-glutamine; positive regulation of angiogenesis; response to angiotensin; response to nutrient; cellular response to hypoxia; hypoxia-inducible factor-1alpha signaling pathway; cellular response to cadmium ion; cellular response to ethanol; response to aldosterone; neutrophil degranulation; cellular response to oxidative stress; electron transport chain; ion transmembrane transport; antigen processing and presentation of exogenous peptide antigen via MHC class I, TAP-dependent; defense response; cell redox homeostasis
Sources:Amigo / QuickGO
Orthologs
Databases	NCBI: entry; OMA: entry
Species	Human	Mouse
Entrez	1536	13058
Ensembl	ENSG00000165168	ENSMUSG00000015340
UniProt	P04839	Q61093
RefSeq (mRNA)	NM_000397	NM_007807
RefSeq (protein)	NP_000388	NP_031833
Location (UCSC)	Chr X: 37.78 – 37.81 Mb	Chr X: 9.3 – 9.35 Mb
PubMed search
- Wikidata
View/Edit Human	View/Edit Mouse

NADPH oxidase 2 (Nox2), also known as cytochrome b(558) subunit beta or Cytochrome b-245 heavy chain, is a protein that in humans is encoded by the NOX2 gene (also called CYBB gene). The protein is a superoxide generating enzyme which forms reactive oxygen species (ROS).

== Function ==
The CYBB gene encode cytochrome b-245, beta chain. This protein is subunit of a group of proteins that forms an enzyme complex called NADPH oxidase, which plays an essential role in the immune system. Within this complex, the cytochrome b-245, beta chain has an alpha chain partner (produced from the CYBA gene). Both alpha and beta chains are required for either to function and the NADPH oxidase complex requires both chains in order to be functional. It has been proposed as a primary component of the microbicidal oxidase system of phagocytes.

Nox2 is the catalytic, membrane-bound subunit of NADPH oxidase. It is inactive until it binds to the membrane-anchored p22phox, forming the heterodimer known as flavocytochrome b558. After activation, the regulatory subunits p67phox, p47phox, p40phox and a GTPase, typically Rac, are recruited to the complex to form NADPH oxidase on the plasma membrane or phagosomal membrane. Nox2 itself is composed of an N-terminal transmembrane domain that binds two heme groups, and a C-terminal domain that is able to bind to FAD and NADPH.

Evidence has shown that it plays an important role in atherosclerotic lesion development in the aortic arch, thoracic, and abdominal aorta.

It has also been shown to play a part in determining the size of a myocardial infarction due to its connection to ROS, which play a role in myocardial reperfusion injury. This was a result of the relation between Nox2 and signaling necessary for neutrophil recruitment. Furthermore, it increases global post-reperfusion oxidative stress, likely due to decreased STAT3 and Erk phosphorylation.

In addition, it appears that hippocampal oxidative stress is increased in septic animals due to the actions of Nox2. This connection also came about through the actions of the chemically active ROS, which work as one of the main components that help in the development of neuroinflammation associated with sepsis-associated encephalopathy (SAE). Endothelial Nox2 limits NF-κB activation and TLR4 expression, which in turn attenuates the severity of hypotension and systemic inflammation induced by lipopolysaccharides (LPS).

It seems that Nox2 also plays an important role in angiotensin II-mediated inward remodelling in cerebral arterioles due to the emittance of superoxides from Nox2-containing NADPH oxidases.

== Clinical significance ==
CYBB deficiency is one of five described biochemical defects associated with chronic granulomatous disease (CGD). CGD is characterized by recurrent, severe infections to pathogens that are normally harmless to humans, such as the common mold Aspergillus niger, and can result from point mutations in the gene encoding Nox2. In this disorder, there is decreased activity of phagocyte NADPH oxidase; neutrophils are able to phagocytize bacteria but cannot kill them in the phagocytic vacuoles. The cause of the killing defect is an inability to increase the cell's respiration and consequent failure to deliver activated oxygen into the phagocytic vacuole. At least 34 disease-causing mutations in this gene have been discovered.

Since Nox2 was shown to play an essential role in determining the size of a myocardial infarction, the protein can be a potential target for drug medication due to its negative effect on myocardial reperfusion.

Recent evidence highly suggests that Nox2 generates ROS which contribute to reduce flow-mediated dilation (FMD) in patients with periphery artery disease (PAD). Scientists have gone to conclude that administering an antioxidant helps with inhibiting Nox2 activity and allowing in the improvement of arterial dilation.

Lastly, targeting Nox2 in the bone marrow could be a great therapeutic attempt at treating vascular injury during diabetic retinopathy (damage to the retina), because the Nox2-generated ROS which are produced by the bone-marrow derived cells & local retinal cells are accumulating the vascular injury in the diabetic retina area.

CYBB transcript levels are upregulated in the lung parenchyma of smokers.

== Interactions ==
Nox2 has been shown to interact directly with podocyte TRPC6 channels.
