= NOX1 =

Protein-coding gene in the species Homo sapiens

Identifiers
- Aliases: NOX1, GP91-2, MOX1, NOH-1, NOH1, NADPH oxidase 1, NOH-1L
- External IDs: OMIM: 300225; MGI: 2450016; GeneCards: NOX1

Gene location (Human)
| Chr. | X chromosome (human) |
| Band | Xq22.1 | Start | 100,843,324 bp |
| Band | Xq22.1 | End | 100,874,359 bp |

Gene location (Mouse)
| Chr. | X chromosome (mouse) |
| Band | X 55.69 cM|X E3 | Start | 132,987,170 bp |
| Band | X 55.69 cM|X E3 | End | 133,122,705 bp |
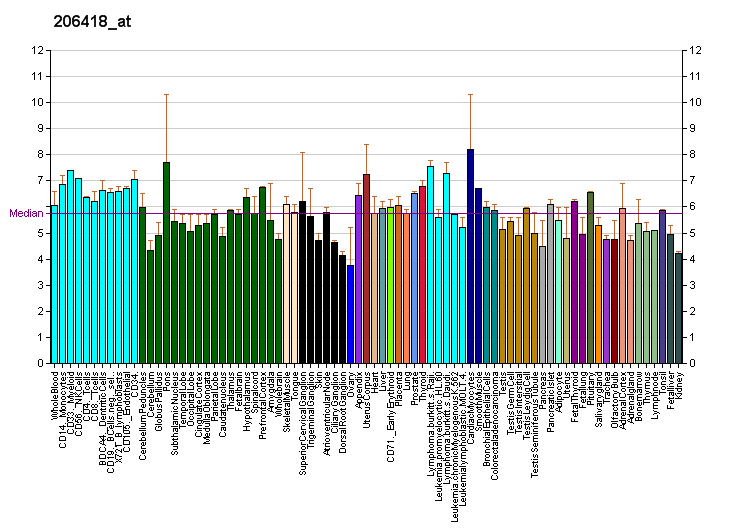

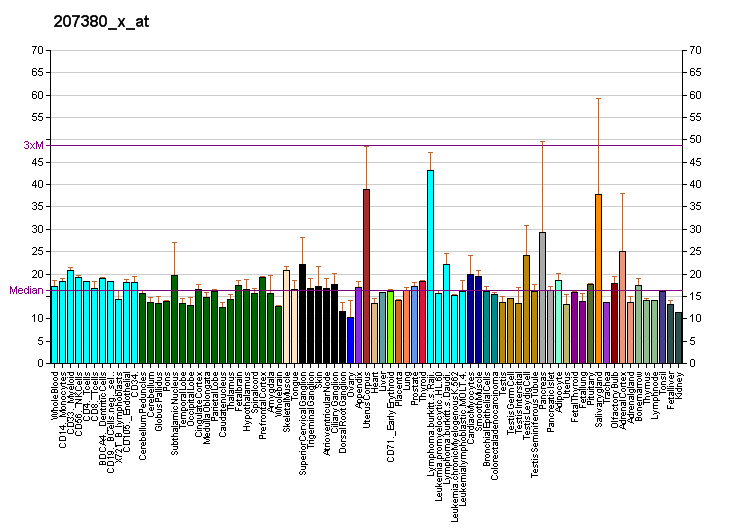

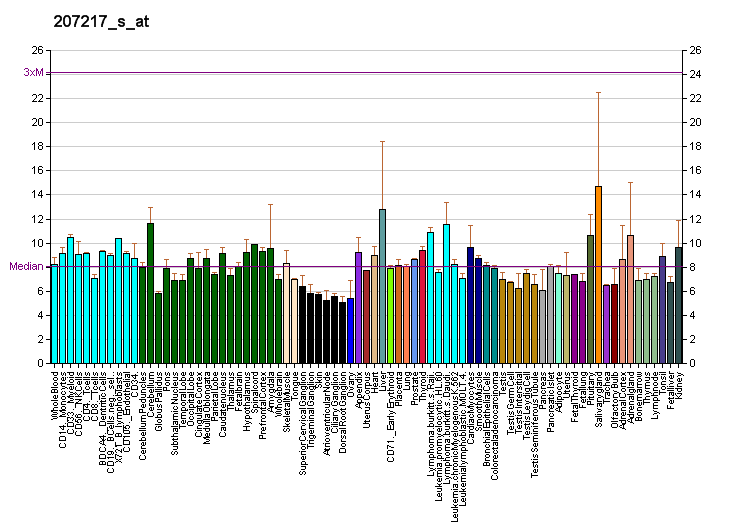
RNA expression pattern
| Bgee | Human / Mouse (ortholog); Top expressed in: rectum; mucosa of sigmoid colon; mucosa of transverse colon; mucosa of ileum; epithelium of colon; testicle; buccal mucosa cell; pancreatic ductal cell; gonad; appendix / Top expressed in: ileum; duodenum; colon; jejunum; secondary oocyte; embryo; dentate gyrus of hippocampal formation granule cell; primary oocyte; zygote; ventricular zone; More reference expression data |
| BioGPS | More reference expression data |
Gene ontology
| Molecular function | metal ion binding; voltage-gated ion channel activity; protein binding; NADP binding; oxidoreductase activity; superoxide-generating NAD(P)H oxidase activity |
| Cellular component | cytoplasm; integral component of membrane; endosome; cell projection; membrane; plasma membrane; cell junction; NADPH oxidase complex; early endosome |
| Biological process | cellular stress response to acidic pH; NADP metabolic process; intracellular pH elevation; cellular response to hyperoxia; regulation of ion transmembrane transport; extracellular matrix organization; positive regulation of JNK cascade; oxygen metabolic process; ion transport; positive regulation of integrin biosynthetic process; regulation of blood pressure; respiratory burst; hydrogen peroxide metabolic process; angiogenesis; positive regulation of cell population proliferation; positive regulation of oxidative stress-induced intrinsic apoptotic signaling pathway; positive regulation of vascular endothelial growth factor production; inflammatory response; regulation of systemic arterial blood pressure by renin-angiotensin; cell migration; signal transduction; positive regulation of smooth muscle cell proliferation; positive regulation of MAPK cascade; ion transmembrane transport; superoxide anion generation; defense response |
Sources:Amigo / QuickGO
Orthologs
| Databases | NCBI: entry; OMA: entry |
| Species | Human | Mouse |
| Entrez | 27035 | 237038 |
| Ensembl | ENSG00000007952 | ENSMUSG00000031257 |
| UniProt | Q9Y5S8 | Q8CIZ9 |
| RefSeq (mRNA) | NM_013955; NM_001271815; NM_007052; NM_013954 | NM_172203 |
| RefSeq (protein) | NP_001258744; NP_008983; NP_039249 | NP_757340 |
| Location (UCSC) | Chr X: 100.84 – 100.87 Mb | Chr X: 132.99 – 133.12 Mb |
| PubMed search |
- Wikidata
| View/Edit Human | View/Edit Mouse |

NADPH oxidase 1 is an enzyme that in humans is encoded by the NOX1 gene.

== Gene ==
Alternative splicing of the human NOX1 gene produces distinct transcript variants. Two experimentally supported human NOX1 isoforms have been described: a full-length form and a shorter splice variant lacking an NAD(P)H-binding region.

== Function ==
NOX1 primarily generates superoxide and functions with regulatory proteins including p22phox, NOXO1, NOXA1 and Rac proteins to form an active NADPH oxidase complex.

NOX1 is expressed particularly strongly in the colon epithelium, where NOX1-dependent reactive oxygen species have been implicated in epithelial homeostasis, proliferation, inflammatory responses and host defense.
