= Function-spacer-lipid Kode construct =

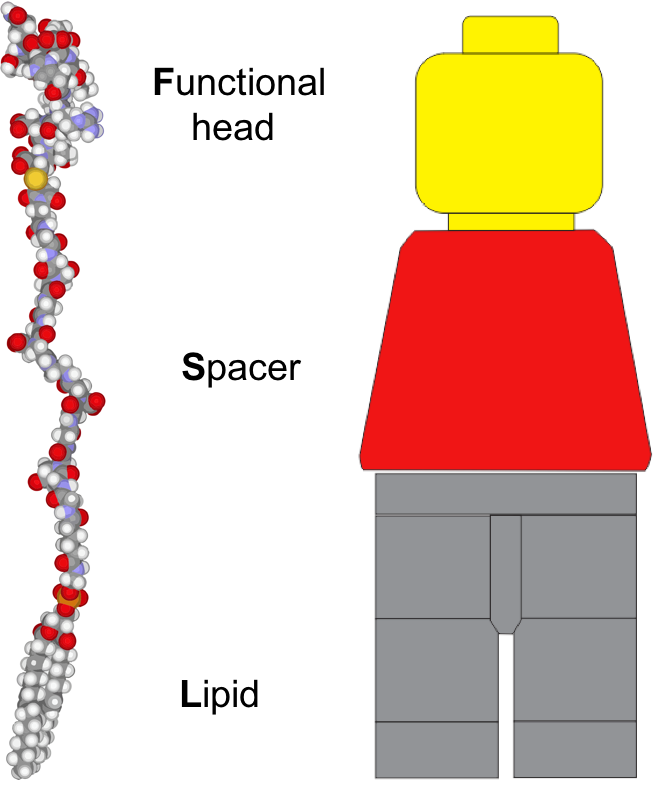
Fig. 1 A structural analogy of a Lego Minifigure to a chemical space filling models of an FSL construct. The FSL construct is a peptide-based partially carboxymethylated oligoglycine (CMG2) spacer with 1,2- dioleoyl-sn-glycero-3-phosphoethanolamine (DOPE) lipid.

Function-Spacer-Lipid (FSL) Kode constructs (Kode Technology) are amphiphatic, water dispersible biosurface engineering constructs that can be used to engineer the surface of cells, viruses and organisms, or to modify solutions and non-biological surfaces with bioactives. FSL Kode constructs spontaneously and stably incorporate into cell membranes. FSL Kode constructs with all these aforementioned features are also known as Kode Constructs. The process of modifying surfaces with FSL Kode constructs is known as "koding" and the resultant "koded" cells, viruses and liposomes are respectively known as kodecytes, and kodevirions.

== Technology description ==
All living surfaces are decorated with a diverse range of complex molecules, which are key modulators of chemical communications and other functions such as protection, adhesion, infectivity, apoptosis, etc. Functional-Spacer-Lipid (FSL) Kode constructs can be synthesized to mimic the bioactive components present on biological surfaces, and then re-present them in novel ways. The architecture of an FSL Kode construct, as implicit in the name, consists of three components - a functional head group, a spacer, and a lipid tail. This structure is analogous to a Lego minifigure in that, they have three structural components, with each component having a separate purpose. In the examples shown in all the figures, a Lego 'minifig' has been used for the analogy. However, it should be appreciated that this is merely a representation and the true structural similarity is significantly varied between Lego minifigures and FSL Kode constructs (fig 1). The functional group of an FSL is equivalent to a Lego minifigure head, with both being at the extremity and carrying the character functional components. The spacer of the FSL is equivalent to the body of the Lego minifigure and the arms on the minifigure are representative of substitutions which may be engineered into the chemical makeup of the spacer. The lipid of the FSL anchors it to lipid membranes and gives the FSL construct its amphiphatic nature which can cause it to self-assemble. Because the lipid tail can act directly as an anchor it is analogous to the legs of a Lego minifigure.

== Flexible design ==
The functional group, the spacer and the lipid tail components of the FSL Kode construct can each be individually designed resulting in FSL Kode constructs with specific biological functions. The functional head group is usually the bioactive component of the construct and the various spacers and lipids influence and effect its presentation, orientation and location on a surface. Critical to the definition of an FSL Kode construct is the requirement to be dispersible in water, and spontaneously and stably incorporate into cell membranes. Other lipid bioconjugates that include components similar to FSLs but do not have these features are not termed as Function-Spacer-Lipid Kode constructs.

=== Functional groups ===
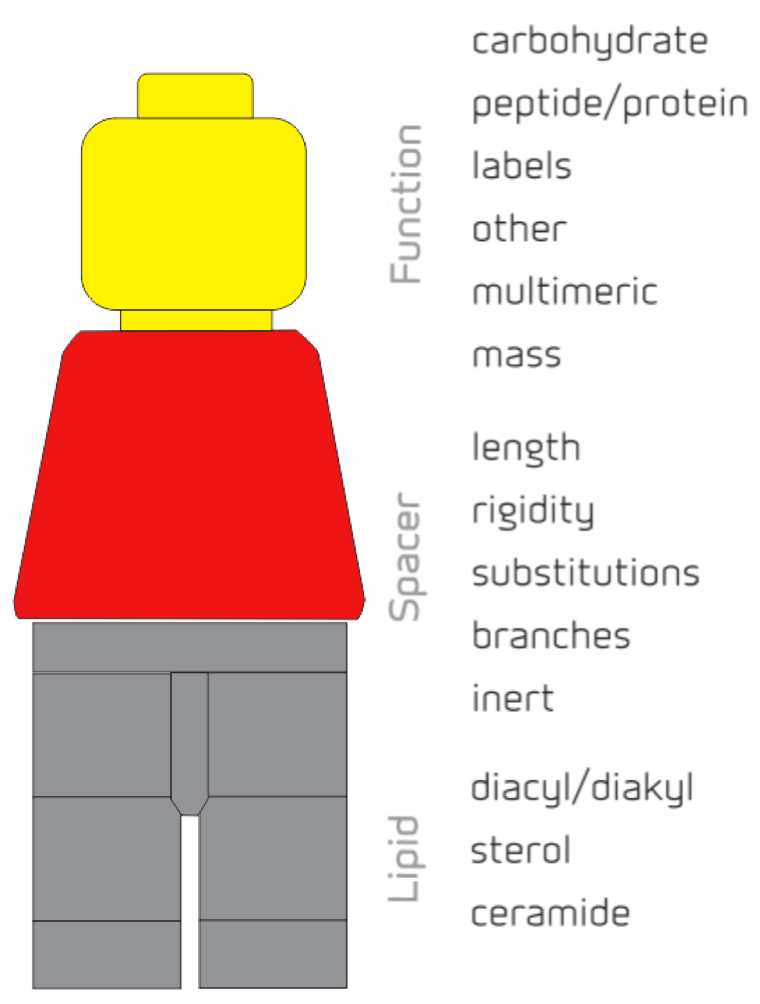
Fig. 2 Diagram showing the features of the function-spacer-lipid construct of a kodecyte, using the analogy of a Lego minifigure. As indicated in the figure, the function group analogous to the minifigures head can be arranged in different substances, the spacer analogous to the body of the minifigure (including the arms) can have a variety of different features, and the lipid or minifigure legs can be a variety of different lipids. Together the three components of function, spacer & lipid represent the FSL construct. Kode Biotech Limited

A large range of functional groups have already been made into FSL Kode constructs. These include:

- Carbohydrates – ranging from monosaccharides to polysaccharides and including blood group antigens, hyaluronic acid oligomers and sialic acid residues
- Peptide/protein – ranging from single amino acids to proteins as large as antibodies
- Labels – including fluorophores, radioisotopes, biotin, etc.
- Other – chemical moieties such as maleimide, click residues, PEG, charged compounds

Note 1: Multimeric – the presentation of the F residue can be as multimers with controlled spacing and be variable.

Note 2: Mass – the mass that can be anchored by an FSL Kode constructs can range from 200 to >1 million Da

=== Spacers ===
The spacer is an integral part of the FSL Kode construct and gives it several important characteristics including water dispersibility.

- Length – the spacer can be varied in length, for example 1.9 nm (Ad), 7.2 nm (CMG2), 11.5 nm (CMG4), allowing for enhanced presentation of Functional groups at the biosurface.
- Optimizes 'F' presentation – The presentation of the bioactive (functional group) on a spacer reduces steric hindrance and increases the bioactive surfaces exposed and available for interactions
- Rigidity – the spacer can be modified to be either flexible or rigid depending upon desired characteristics
- Substitutions (represented by the leaves on the stalk) – the spacer can be modified both in charge, and polarity.
- Branches – usually the spacer is linear, but it can also be branched including specific spacing of the branches to optimize presentation and interaction of the F group.
- Inert – important to the design of FSL Kode constructs is the biologically inert nature of the spacer. Importantly this feature means the S-L components of the constructs are unreactive with undiluted serum. Consequently, the constructs are compatible in vivo use, and can improve diagnostic assay sensitivity by allowing for the use of undiluted serum.

=== Lipids ===
The lipid tail is essential for enabling lipid membrane insertion and retention but also for giving the construct amphiphilic characteristics that enable hydrophilic surface coating (due to formation of bilipid layers). Different membrane lipids that can be used to create FSLs have different membrane physiochemical characteristics and thus can affect biological function of the FSL. Lipids in FSL Kode constructs include:

- Diacyl/diakyl e.g. DOPE
- Sterols e.g. cholesterol
- Ceramides

== Optimising functional group (F) presentation ==
Fig. 3 Diagram comparing the presentation of antigens in immunoassays between a typical direct attachment and in a function-spacer-lipid (by analogy to a flower).

Upper image shows the antigen (flower head) presented in a variety of formats directly on a solid surface. The construct attaches randomly to the solid surface.

Lower image shows the same antigen (flower head) presented in optimal orientation as an FSL construct with a spacer (stalk) holding it away from the solid surface. The lipid tail (roots) causes the construct to attach to the solid surface.

Fig. 4 Combinations of different spacers, lipids and other modifications can be used to optimise the functionality of the function group on the FSL construct.

In all diagrams, the same functional group is represented by the sunflower head. The first four examples show monomeric presentation of F, with the first example representing the short 1.9nm (Ad) spacer (the flower stalk). The second and fourth with the longer stalks (spacers) representing the CMG2 7.2nm spacer and CMG4 11.5nm spacers respectively. The second and third constructs have the same spacers, but the lipid tail of the third construct is cholesterol, rather than DOPE.

The last three examples all based on CMG2 spacers (stalks), with a DOPE lipid tail (roots) are multimeric presentations of F. The first of these is a simple duplication of the F group, while the following has an additional spacer between the F groups. The final construct is a cluster presentation.

One of the important functions of an FSL construct is that it can optimise the presentation of antigens, both on cell surfaces and solid-phase membranes. This optimisation is achieved primarily by the spacer, and secondarily by the lipid tail. In a typical immunoassay, the antigen is deposited directly onto the microplate surface and binds to the surface either in a random fashion, or in a preferred orientation depending on the residues present on the surface of this antigen. Usually this deposition process is uncontrolled. In contrast, the FSL Kode construct bound to a microplate presents the antigen away from the surface in an orientation with a high level of exposure to the environment. Furthermore, typical immunoassays use recombinant peptides rather than discrete peptide antigens. As the recombinant peptide is many times bigger than the epitope of interest, a lot of undesired and unwanted peptide sequences are also represented on the microplate. These additional sequences may include unwanted microbial related sequences (as determined by a BLAST analysis) that can cause issues of low level cross-reactivity. Often the mechanism by which an immunoassay is able to overcome this low level activity is to dilute the serum so that the low level microbial reactive antibodies are not seen, and only high-level specific antibodies result in an interpretable result. In contrast, FSL Kode constructs usually use specifically selected peptide fragments (up to 40 amino acids), thereby overcoming cross-reactivity with microbial sequences, and allowing for the use of undiluted serum (which increases sensitivity).

The F component can be further enhanced by presentation of it in multimeric formats and with specific spacing. The four types of multimeric format include linear repeating units, linear repeating units with spacing, clusters, and branching (Fig. 4).

== Mechanisms of interaction ==
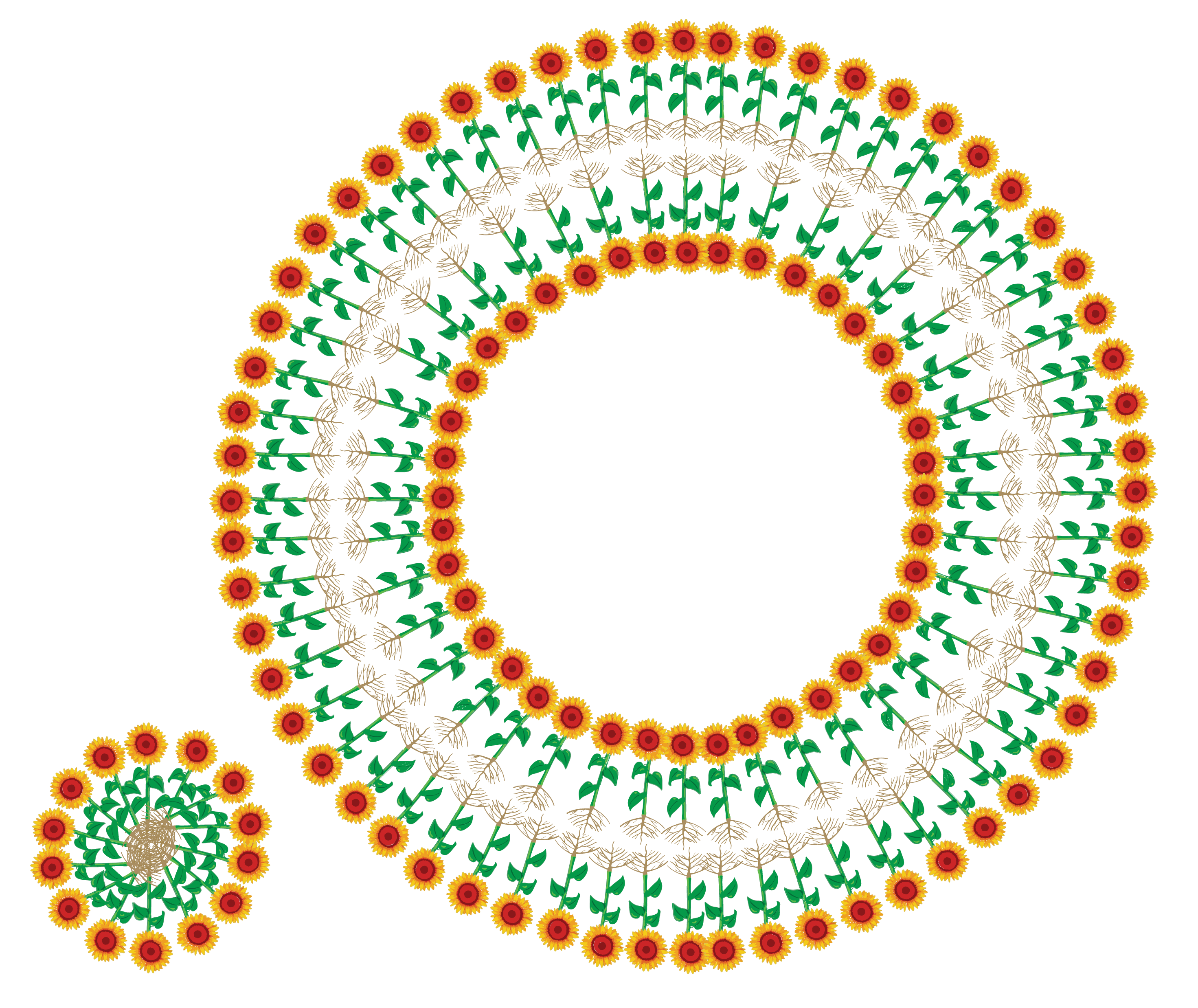
Fig. 5a Schematic cross-sectional slice of FSL micelles. FSL construct by nature of its composition in possessing both hydrophobic and hydrophilic regions is amphiphilic (or amphiphathic). This characteristic determines the way in which the construct will interact with surfaces. When present in a solution they may form simple micelles or adopt more complex bilayer structures

Fig. 5b Hydrophobic surface FSL coating. The hydrophobic lipid tail of an FSL construct will interact and anchor FSL constructs directly onto hydrophobic surfaces.

Fig. 5c Hydrophilic surface FSL coating. The hydrophobic lipid tail of an FSL construct will not interact directly with hydrophilic surfaces. Instead, due to the amphiphilic nature of the FSL, the construct will spontaneously form into a bilayer. The surface of the bilayer will be hydrophilic, allowing it to interact and anchor the FSLs to the hydrophilic surface.

=== Amphiphilic FSL Kode construct ===
The FSL Kode construct by nature of its composition in possessing both hydrophobic and hydrophilic regions are amphiphilic (or amphipathic). This characteristic determines the way in which the construct will interact with surfaces. When present in a solution they may form simple micelles or adopt more complex bilayer structures with two simplistic examples shown in Fig. 5a. More complex structures are expected. The actual nature of FSL micelles has not been determined. However, based on normal structural function of micelles, it is expected that it will be determined in part by the combination of functional group, spacer and lipid together with temperature, concentration, size and hydrophobicity/hydrophilicity for each FSL Kode construct type.

Surface coatings will occur via two theoretical mechanisms, the first being direct hydrophobic interaction of the lipid tail with a hydrophobic surface resulting in a monolayer of FSL at the surface (Fig. 5b). Hydrophobic binding of the FSL will be via its hydrophobic lipid tail interacting directly with the hydrophobic (lipophilic) surface. The second surface coating will be through the formation of bilayers as the lipid tail is unable to react with the hydrophilic surface. In this case the lipids will induce the formation of a bilayer, the surface of which will be hydrophilic. This hydrophilic membrane will then interact directly with the hydrophilic surface and will probably encapsulate fibres. This hydrophilic bilayer binding is the expected mechanism by which FSLs are able to bind to fibrous membranes such as paper and glass fibres (Fig. 5c) and (Fig. 9).

=== Lipid membrane modification ===
Fig. 6a A plasma membrane modified with FSL constructs (by analogy to sunflower), creating a kodecyte membrane.

Fig. 6b FSL constructs (by analogy to sunflower) inserted via their lipid tail (roots) into a liposome. The spacer of the FSL (stalk) hold the functional group of the FSL (flower head) away from the surface.

After labeling of the surface with the selected F bioactives, the constructs will be present and oriented at the membrane surface. It is expected that the FSL will be highly mobile within the membrane and the choice of lipid tail will effect is relative partitioning within the membrane. The construct unless it has flip-flop behavior is expected to remain surface presented. However, the modification is not permanent in living cells and constructs will be lost (consumed) at a rate proportional to the activity at the membrane and division rate of the cell (with dead cells remaining highly labeled). Additionally, when present in vivo with serum lipids FSLs will elute from the membrane into the plasma at a rate of about 1% per hour. In fixed cells or inactive cells (e.g. red cells) stored in serum free media the constructs are retained normally.

Liposomes are easy koded by simply adding FSL Kode constructs into the preparation. Contacting koded liposomes with microplates or other surfaces can cause the labeling of the microplate surface.

=== Non-biologic surface interaction ===
Non-biologic surface coatings will occur via two mechanisms, the first being direct hydrophobic interaction of the lipid tail with a hydrophobic surface resulting in a monolayer of FSL at the surface. The second surface coating will be through the formation of bilayers, which probably either encapsulate fibres or being via the hydrophilic F group. This is the expected mechanism by which FSLs bind to fibrous membranes such as paper and glass fibres. A recent study has found that when FSL Kode constructs are optimised, could in a few seconds glycosylate almost any non-biological surface including metals, glass, plastics, rubbers, and other polymers.

== Technology features ==
The technological features of FSL Kode constructs and the koding process can be summarized as follows:

- Rapid and simple – simple contact for 10–120 minutes and constructs spontaneously and stably incorporate – no washing required.
- Replicable – same variables (time, temperature, concentration) equals the same result.
- Toxicity – FSL constructs are biocompatible, disperse into biological solutions without solvents, detergents. They label non-covalently and are non-genetic. Normal vitality and functionality is maintained in modified cells/virions/organisms. Toxicity/vitality experiments in small laboratory animals, zebrafish, cell cultures, spermatozoa and embryos find no toxic effects within physiological ranges.
- Amphiphilic – the amphiphilic nature of the FSL Kode construct makes them water dispersible (clear solution of micelles), yet once interacted with a membrane they insert/coat and become water resistant
- Variable design – a single F can be presented in more than 100 ways by varying the spacer and lipid.
- High biovisibility – as the spacer holds the F moiety away for the membrane it is able to achieve increased sensitivity, specificity and reactivity can be optimized by use of multiple and variable biomarker presentations on the same surface.
- Additive – FSL modification is compatible with other technologies allowing users to add additional features to cells/viruses/organisms/surfaces already modified by more traditional methods. Multiple FSL constructs may be added to a surface simultaneously by simply creating a mix of FSL Kode constructs. Constructs insert into living or fixed cell (glutaraldehyde) membranes.

Fig. 8 FSLs can be easily created from cysteine-containing peptides, proteins or any other thiols of biological interest. The mixing of a cysteine containing peptide with FSL-RFG(Maleimide), in 4MMF buffer, allows the peptide to react with the maleimide residue of the FSL (through the well-known Michael nucleophilic addition reaction). Following overnight incubation then vacuum drying, an FSL peptide is created. No purification is required.

- Simple FSL peptide synthesis – there is a reactive-functional-group FSL Kode construct with maleimide as its functional group which can be used for preparation of FSLs from cysteine-containing peptides, proteins or any other thiols of biological interest. The effective synthetic approach is based on the well-known Michael nucleophilic addition to maleimides (Fig. 7).
- Synthetic "Gylcolipids" – one family of the FSL constructs are synthetic glycolipids with well-defined hydrophobic tails and carbohydrate head groups

=== Koded membranes surfaces and solutions ===
FSL constructs have a wide range of uses and they have been used to modify the following:

- Cells – blood cells, culture lines, embryos, spermatozoa
- Viruses – influenza, measles, varicella
- Organisms – parasites, microbes, zebrafish
- Liposomes – also micelles, lipid particles
- Surfaces/fibres – hydrophobic or hydrophilic membranes/fibres, paper, nitrocellulose, cotton, silk, glass, Teflon, silica, magnetic beads (microspheres) etc.
- Solutions – saline, plasma/serum, culture media

== Methodology for FSL use (koding) ==
Fig. 9 Preparation of kodecytes/kodevirions. Simply mix cells/virions with an FSL solution (containing 1 or more FSLs) and incubate for 10–120 minutes at 37°C (or at temperatures as low as 4°C). The constructs will spontaneously incorporate into the membrane and no further steps are required.

FSL constructs, when in solution (saline) and in contact, will spontaneously incorporate into cell and virus membranes. The methodology involves simply preparing a solution of FSL constructs in the range of 1–1000 μg/mL. The actual concentration will depend on the construct and the quantity of construct required in the membrane. One part of FSL solution is added to one part of cells (up to 100% suspension) and they are incubated at a set temperature within the range of 4–37 °C (39–99 °F) depending on temperature compatibility of the cells being modified. The higher the temperature, the faster the rate of FSL insertion into the membrane. For red blood cells, at 37 °C incubation for 2 hours achieves >95% insertion with at least 50% insertion being achieved within 20 minutes. In general, FSL insertion time of 4 hours at room temperature or 20 hours at 4 °C gives results similar to 1 hour at 37 °C for carbohydrate based FSLs inserting into red blood cells. The resultant kodecytes or kodevirions do not required to be washed, however this option should be considered if an excess of FSL construct is used in the koding process.

== Applications ==
FSL Kode constructs have been used for research and development, diagnostic products, and are currently being investigated as potential therapeutic agents.

=== Kodecytes ===
FSL have been used to create human red cell kodecytes that have been used to detect and identify blood group allo-antibodies as ABO sub-group mimics, ABO quality control systems, serologic teaching kits and a syphilis diagnostic. Kodecytes have also demonstrated that FSL-FLRO4 is a suitable reagent for labelling packed red blood cells (PRBC) at any point during routine storage and look to facilitate the development of immunoassays and transfusion models focused on addressing the mechanisms involved in transfusion-related immunomodulation (TRIM). Murine kodecytes have been experimentally used to determine in vivo cell survival, and create model transfusion reactions. Zebrafish kodecytes have been used to determine real time in vivo cell migration. Kodecytes have been used to create influenza diagnostics. Kodecytes which have been modified with FSL-GB3 were unable to be infected with the HIV virus.

=== Kodevirions ===
Kodevirions are FSL modified viruses. Several FSL Kode constructs have been used to label viruses to assist in their flow-cytometric visualisation and to track them real time distribution in animal models. They have also been used to modify the surface of viruses with the intention of targeting them to be used to attach tumors (oncolytic).

=== Kodesomes ===
Kodesomes are liposomes that have been decorated with FSL Kode constructs. These have been used to deposit FSL constructs onto microplates to create diagnostic assays. They also have the potential for therapeutic use.

=== Koded solutions ===
These are solutions containing FSL Kode constructs where the construct will exist as a clear micellular dispersion. FSL-GB3 as a solution/gel has been used to inhibit HIV infection and to neutralise Shiga toxin. FSL blood group A as a solution has been used to neutralise circulating antibodies in a mouse model and allow incompatible blood group A (murine kodecytes) transfusion. This model experiment was used to demonstrate the potential of FSLs to neutralise circulating antibody and allow for incompatible blood transfusion or organ transplantation.

=== Koded surfaces ===
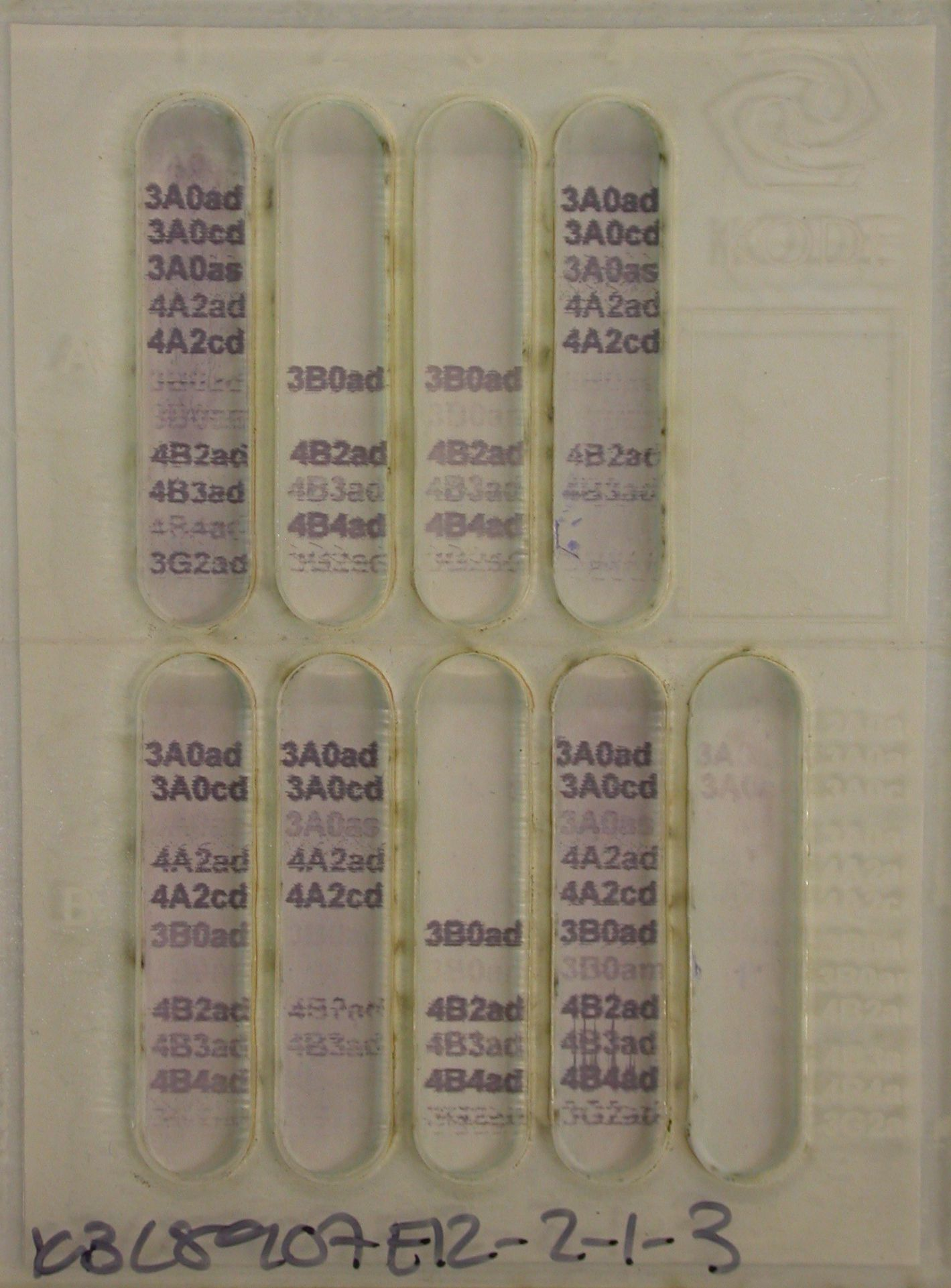
Fig. 10 FSL constructs can be printed with a standard desktop inkjet printer directly onto paper to create immunoassays. Image is a typical example of an inkjet printed enzyme immunoassay (EIA) where 12 different FSL constructs were printed as identifying codes on paper and then reacted against different samples. The antibody activity in the samples can be identified by appearance of words identifying the target antigen. An empty inkjet cartridge is filled with an FSL construct and words, barcodes, or graphics are printed. A Perspex template is adhered to the surface to create reaction wells. The method is then a standard EIA procedure, but blocking of serum is not required and undiluted serum can be used. A typical EIA procedure is as follows: add serum, incubate, wash by immersion, add secondary EIA detection antibody, incubate, wash, add NBT/BCIP precipitating substrate and stop the reaction when developed by washing. The result is stable for years.

All FSL Kode constructs disperse in water and are therefore compatible with inkjet printers. FSL constructs can be printed with a standard desktop inkjet printer directly onto paper to create immunoassays. An empty ink cartridge is filled with an FSL construct and words, barcodes, or graphics are printed. A Perspex template is adhered to the surface to create reaction wells. The method is then a standard EIA procedure, but blocking of serum is not required and undiluted serum can be used. A typical procedure is as follows: add serum, incubate, wash by immersion, add secondary EIA conjugate, incubate, wash, add NBT/BCIP precipitating substrate and stop the reaction when developed by washing (Fig. 9). The result is stable for years.

== See also ==
- Kodevirion
- Kodecyte
