= FSL =

FSL may refer to:

== Language ==
- Filipino Sign Language
- Finnish Sign Language
- French Sign Language

== Other uses ==
- Fast Simplex Link, a soft microprocessor bus
- Few-shot learning, a machine learning method
- Fiji Senior League, a football league in Fiji
- Fleet Support Limited, a British logistics company
- Florida State League, an American minor baseball league
- Fluid Science Laboratory, on the International Space Station
- FMRIB Software Library
- FM FSL, a rifle
- Folger Shakespeare Library in Washington, D.C., United States
- Forecast Systems Laboratory of the United States National Oceanic and Atmospheric Administration
- Fox Sports Live, an American television program
- Fraternitas Scintilla Legis, a Philippine fraternity
- Freescale Semiconductor, an American semiconductor manufacturer
- Free-space loss
- Friends' School, Lisburn, in Northern Ireland
- Function-spacer-lipid construct
