= Porcine viruses =

Porcine viruses may refer to:

- Porcine epidemic diarrhea virus
- Porcine reproductive and respiratory syndrome virus
- Porcine circovirus
- Porcine parvovirus
