= Kodevirion =

The term kodecyte is used to describe cells with detectable Function-Spacer-Lipid (FSL) constructs, and in concert, the term kodevirion (pronounced co-da-virion), is used to describe virions with detectable FSL constructs.

The method for labeling virions with FSL constructs is simple, non covalent and only involves incubation of the virion with the FSL construct in saline for a few hours – nothing further is required. The FSL construct will spontaneously, stably and quantitatively incorporate into the virion membrane. Virions have been labelled with fluorescent (FSL-FLRO4) and radioactive iodine (FSL-125I). FSL-FLRO4 could be shown to label virions in a dose dependent manner and could be visualized by flow cytometry either directly, or indirectly if the virion had bound to the cell or fused with the cell membrane. FSLs do not appear to significantly affect the virions infectivity or their ability to bind target cells, probably because they integrate into the membrane without exposing the virion to chemical agents or covalent modification.

== See also ==
- Function-Spacer-Lipid construct (Kode™ Technology)
- Kodecyte
