= SMEDI =

SMEDI (an acronym of stillbirth, mummification, embryonic death, and infertility) is a reproductive disease of swine caused by Porcine parvovirus (PPV) and Porcine enterovirus. The term SMEDI usually indicates Porcine enterovirus, but it also can indicate Porcine parvovirus, which is a more important cause of the syndrome. SMEDI also causes abortion, neonatal death, and decreased male fertility.

From an economic standpoint SMEDI is an important disease because of the loss of productivity from fetal death in affected herds. Initial infection of a herd causes the greatest effect, but losses slow over time. The disease is spread most commonly by ingestion of food and water contaminated with infected feces and occasionally through sexual contact and contact with aborted tissue. A vaccine is available (ATCvet code: QI09AA02 (WHO)).

== Pathogenesis ==
This depends on the age of the animal affected and the efficiency of its immune system. Colostral protection lasts up to 5 months of age, after which it decreases to an all-time low to increase yet again at about 12 months of age.

- Prenatal infection: virus travels from infected mother to fetus via the placenta. In this case, the time of gestation determines the result of the infection.
  - If the fetus is infected in the first 30 days of fetal life, death and absorption of all, or some of the fetuses may occur. In this case, some immunotolerant healthy piglets may be born.
  - If the infection happens at 40 days, death and mummification may occur. Also in this case, some or all the fetuses are involved, i.e. some of the fetuses can be born healthy and immunotolerant, or else carriers of the disease.
  - If the viruses crosses the placenta in the last trimester, neonatal death may occur, or the birth of healthy piglets with a protective pre-colostral immunity.
- Postnatal infection (pigs up to 1 year of age): Infection occurs oro-nasally, followed by a viremic period associated with transitory leucopenia.
- Infection in adults (over 1 year of age): These subject would have an active, protective immune system which protects them from future exposures (e.g. mating with an infected male).

The virus is particularly dangerous for the sow in her first gestation, which would be at 7–8 months of age, as she would have a particularly low antibody count at this age and could easily contract the virus via copulation.

== Lesions ==
Histologically, the pregnant sow suffers lesions in the myometrium due to the infiltration of monocytes. The fetus presents: retarded growth, congestion of superficial vessels which may be associated with hemorrhage and dehydration which results in mummification of the fetus.
