= Porcine parvovirus =

Virus classification
- (unranked): Virus
- Realm: Floreoviria
- Kingdom: Shotokuvirae
- Phylum: Cossaviricota
- Class: Quintoviricetes
- Order: Piccovirales
- Family: Parvoviridae
- Genus: Protoparvovirus
- Species: Protoparvovirus ungulate1

Member viruses
- Porcine parvovirus

Synonyms
- Porcine parvovirus

Species of virus

Porcine parvovirus (PPV, Protoparvovirus ungulate1), a virus of the genus Protoparvovirus in the virus family Parvoviridae, causes reproductive failure of swine characterized by embryonic and fetal infection and death, usually in the absence of outward maternal clinical signs. The disease develops mainly when seronegative dams are exposed oronasally to the virus anytime during about the first half of gestation, and conceptuses are subsequently infected transplacentally before they become immunocompetent. There is no definitive evidence that infection of swine other than during gestation is of any clinical or economic significance. The virus is ubiquitous among swine throughout the world and is enzootic in most herds that have been tested. Diagnostic surveys have indicated that PPV is the major infectious cause of embryonic and fetal death. In addition to its direct causal role in reproductive failure, PPV can potentiate the effects of porcine circovirus type II (PCV2) infection in the clinical course of postweaning multisystemic wasting syndrome (PMWS).

== Signs and symptoms ==
Acute infection of postnatal pigs, including pregnant dams that subsequently develop reproductive failure, is usually subclinical. However, in young pigs and probably in older breeding stock as well, the virus replicates extensively and is found in many tissues and organs with a high mitotic index. Viral antigen is especially concentrated in lymphoid tissues (Fig. 3A, B). Many pigs, irrespective of age or sex, have a transient, usually mild, leukopenia sometime within 10 days after initial exposure to the virus. PPV and other structurally similar viruses have been identified in the feces of pigs with diarrhea. However, there is no experimental evidence to suggest that PPV either replicates extensively in the intestinal crypt epithelium or causes enteric disease as do parvoviruses of several other species. PPV also has been isolated from pigs with lesions described as vesiclelike. The causal role of PPV in such lesions has not been clearly defined.

The major and usually only clinical response to infection with PPV is maternal reproductive failure. Pathologic sequelae depend mainly on when exposure occurs during gestation. Dams may return to estrus, fail to farrow despite being anestrus, farrow few pigs per litter, or farrow a large proportion of mummified fetuses. All can reflect embryonic or fetal death or both. The only outward sign may be a decrease in maternal abdominal girth when fetuses die at midgestation or later and their associated fluids are resorbed. Other manifestations of maternal reproductive failure, namely, infertility, abortion, stillbirth, neonatal death, and reduced neonatal vitality, also have been ascribed to infection with PPV. These are normally only a minor component of the disease. The presence of mummified fetuses in a litter can prolong both gestation and the farrowing interval. Either may result in stillbirth of apparently normal littermates, whether or not they are infected.

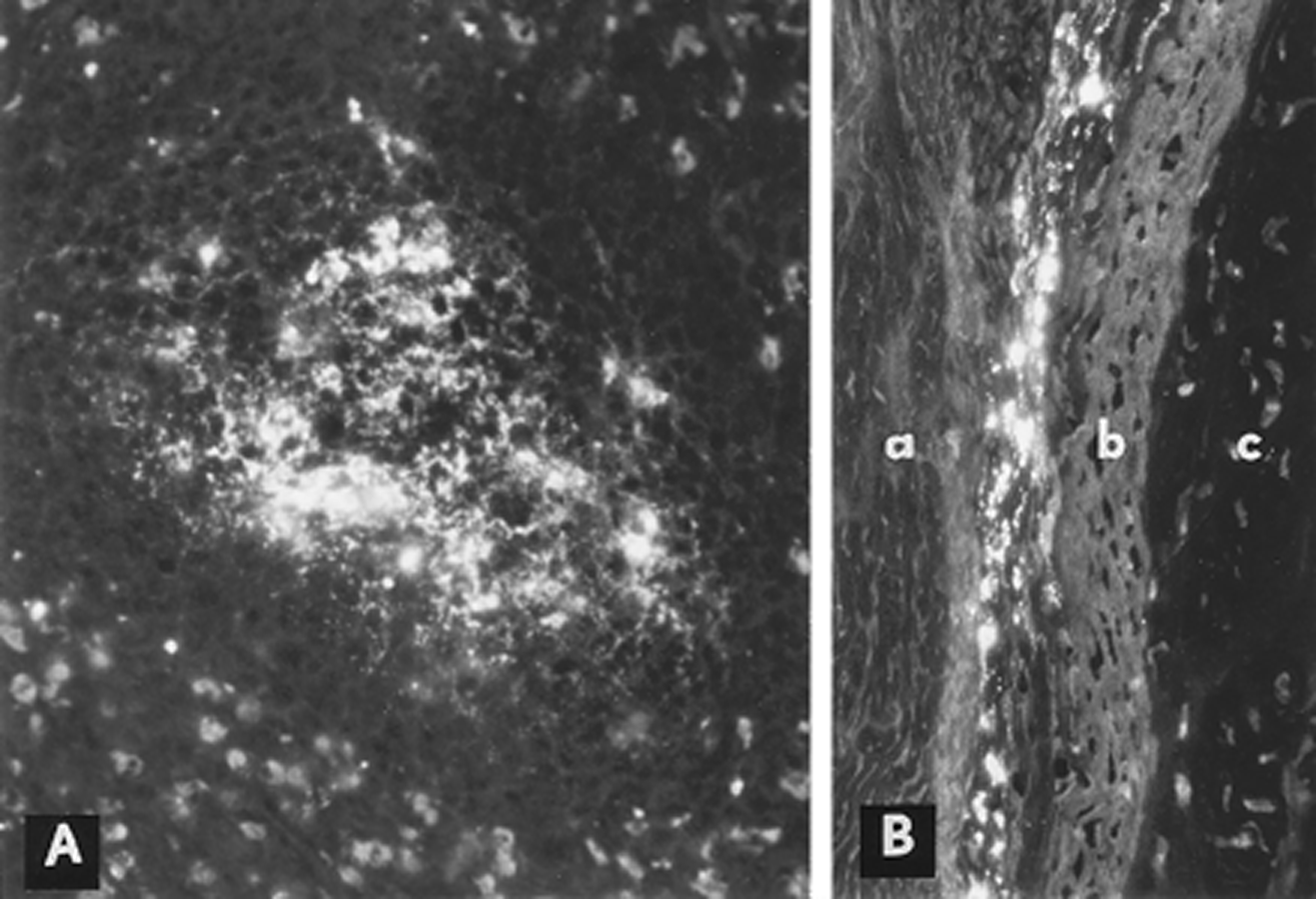
Figure 3. Cryostat-microtome sections of tissues from PPV-infected 8-week-old pigs, examined by IF microscopy (×312.5). (A) Viral antigen in germinal center, tonsil. (B) Viral antigen in osteogenic layer of periosteum, rib: a = connective tissue, b = cortical bone, c = marrow cavity.

There is no evidence that either fertility or libido of boars is altered by infection with PPV.

== Cause ==
PPV is classified in the genus Parvovirus (Latin parvus = small) of the family Parvoviridae. All isolates of PPV that have been compared have been found antigenically similar if not identical. PPV is also antigenically related to several other members of the genus. However, its identity can be established by relatively stringent serologic tests such as viral neutralization (VN) and hemagglutination inhibition (HI).

=== Biophysical and biochemical properties ===
The biophysical and biochemical properties of PPV have been extensively studied and are summarized as follows. A mature virion has cubic symmetry, two or three capsid proteins, a diameter of approximately 20 nm, 32 capsomeres, no envelope or essential lipids, and a weight of 5.3 million daltons. The viral genome is single-stranded deoxyribonucleic acid (DNA) with a molecular weight of 1.4 million (i.e., about 26.5% of the weight of the complete virion). Buoyant densities (g/mL in cesium chloride) of complete infectious virions, incomplete "empty" virions, and extracted virion DNA are 1.38–1.395, 1.30–1.315, and 1.724 respectively. Viral infectivity, hemagglutinating activity, and antigenicity are remarkably resistant to heat, a wide range of hydrogen ion concentrations, and enzymes.

=== Replication ===
Replication of PPV in vitro is cytocidal and characterized by "rounding up," pyknosis, and lysis of cells (Fig. 1A). Many of the cell fragments often remain attached, eventually giving the affected culture a ragged appearance. Intranuclear inclusions develop but they are often sparsely distributed. Infected cultures may hemadsorb slightly (Fig. 1B). Cytopathic changes are extensive when cell culture-adapted virus is propagated under appropriate conditions. However, on initial isolation several serial passages of the virus or, better, the infected culture may be necessary before the effects are recognized. The use of immunofluorescence (IF) microscopy greatly increases the likelihood of detecting minimally infected cultures.

Primary and secondary cultures of fetal or neonatal porcine kidney cells are most often used for propagation and titration of PPV, although other kinds of cultures are also susceptible. Replication is enhanced by infection of mitotically active cultures. Many cells in such cultures are in the S phase (i.e., the DNA synthesis phase) of their cell cycle, wherein the DNA polymerases of cell origin needed for viral replication are available.

If either fetal or adult bovine serum is incorporated in the nutrient medium of cell cultures used to propagate PPV, it should be pretested for viral inhibitors. The same may apply to sera of several other species. Because replication of PPV is affected by mitotic activity, the effect of the serum on the cells is also especially important. In addition, cultures should be pretested for PPV contamination. Cultures are sometimes unknowingly prepared from infected tissues of fetal and postnatal pigs. Moreover, PPV can be accidentally introduced into cultures in several ways, including the use of contaminated trypsin. If contamination is detected before all cells are infected, the virus can be eliminated by repeatedly subculturing the cells in the presence of nutrient medium containing PPV antiserum.

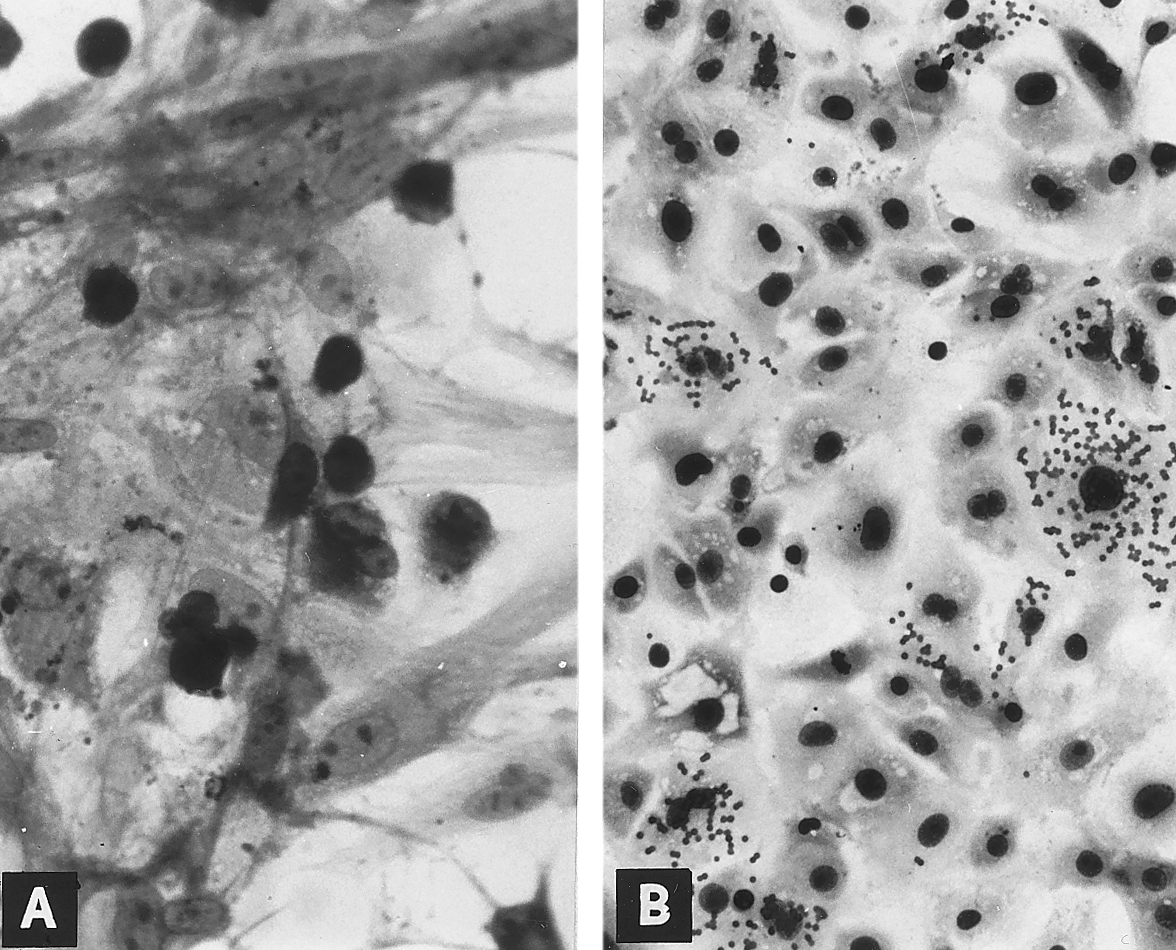
Figure 1. Cell cultures infected with PPV. (A) Cytopathic effect, secondary fetal porcine kidney cells, 120 hours after infection (×250). (B) Hemadsorption, secondary adult porcine thyroid cells, guinea pig erythrocytes, 22 hours after thyroid cells were infected and then subcultured (May-Grünwald-Giemsa; ×100).

Several investigators have used IF microscopy to follow the development of PPV in cell culture. In general, the sequence of events is as follows. Viral antigen is detected in the cytoplasm of cells soon after infection if the inoculum contains a high titer of virus and viral antigen. Most, if not all, of this early cytoplasmic fluorescence is the result of antigen phagocytized from the inoculum. By sequential examinations, such antigen can be demonstrated first on the external surface of the cytoplasmic membrane and later within the cytoplasm, often relatively concentrated in a juxtanuclear location. The first unequivocal evidence of viral replication is the appearance of nascent viral antigen in the nucleus (Fig. 2A). In at least some infected cells, nascent antigen next appears in the cytoplasm in sufficient quantity that both cytoplasm and nucleus are brightly fluorescent. Infected cells commonly seen in the lung of fetuses that develop a high titer of antibody for PPV probably represent this stage of replication (see Fig. 8C). Affected cells subsequently round up, become pyknotic, and disintegrate with release of virus and viral antigen (Fig. 2B). Other cells in the culture that are not at the appropriate stage to support viral replication continue to phagocytize and accumulate viral antigen in their cytoplasm (Fig. 2C). A second wave of viral replication can be induced if these cells are stimulated to enter the S phase of the cell cycle as, for example, by the addition of fresh culture medium.

=== Hemagglutination ===
PPV agglutinates human, monkey, guinea pig, cat, chicken, rat, and mouse erythrocytes. Erythrocytes of other kinds of animals that have been tested are relatively or completely insensitive, or the results have been equivocal. Several parameters of the hemagglutination (HA) test—such as the temperature of incubation, the species of erythrocyte used, and in the case of chicken erythrocytes the genetic composition and age of the donor—may quantitatively affect results. The HA test is most commonly conducted at room temperature, at approximately neutral pH, and with guinea pig erythrocytes. Higher HA titers have been recorded when the diluent used in the test was veronal buffer rather than phosphate-buffered saline. Elution of virus (the hemagglutinin is part of the virion) can be induced by suspending erythrocytes in alkaline buffer, pH 9.

=== Infectivity assays ===
Infectivity assays are conducted in a standard manner except that, because cytopathic changes at terminal dilutions are often vague, endpoints of infectivity are often determined either by examining cell cultures for intranuclear inclusions after appropriate staining or by examining cell culture medium for viral hemagglutinin. A titration procedure wherein infected cells are made evident by IF microscopy and a plaque assay also have been described.

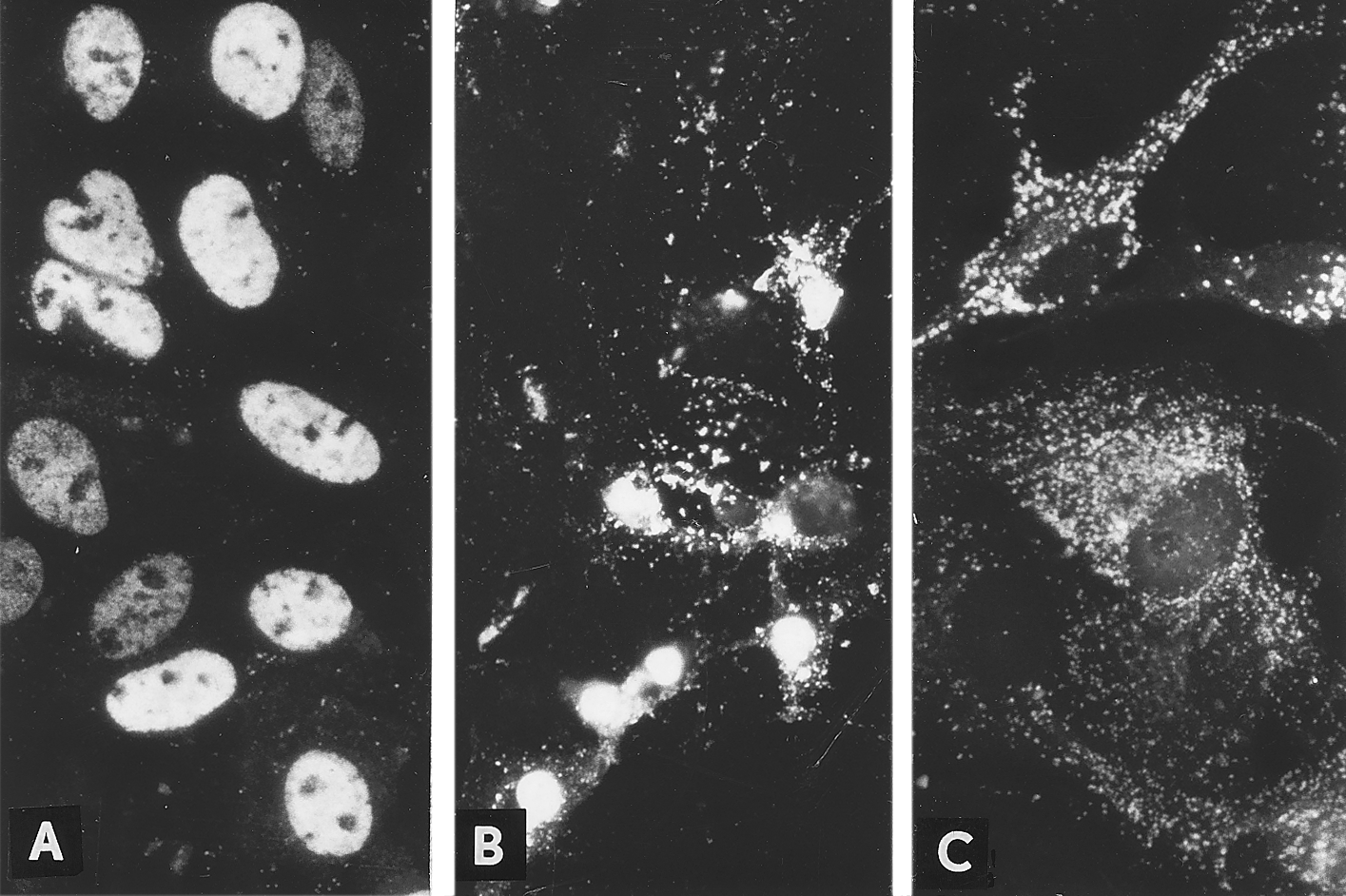
Figure 2. Secondary cultures of fetal porcine kidney cells infected with PPV and examined by IF microscopy (×500). (A) 14 hours after infection, culture fixed and then reacted with fluorescent antibodies (FA). (B) 24 hours after infection, culture reacted with FA and then fixed; only extracellular antigen and antigen in cells with disrupted cytoplasmic and nuclear membranes are identified. (C) 48 hours after infection, culture fixed and then reacted with FA.

=== Serologic ===
Tests The HI test is frequently used for detection and quantitation of humoral antibody for PPV. Antibody sometimes can be detected as early as 5 days after swine are exposed to live virus, and it may persist for years. Sera examined by the HI test are usually pretreated by heat inactivation (56?C, 30 minutes) and by adsorption with erythrocytes (to remove naturally occurring hemagglutinins) and kaolin (to remove or reduce nonantibody inhibitors of HA). Trypsin also has been used to remove nonantibody inhibitors of HA. Parameters of the HI test have been studied in detail.

The SN test is occasionally used for detection and quantitation of humoral antibody for PPV. Neutralization of infectivity is usually confirmed by the absence or reduction either of intranuclear inclusions or fluorescent cells in cultures or of viral hemagglutinin in the culture medium. The SN test has been reported to be more sensitive than the HI test. A microtechnique for application of the SN test has been described.

Immunodiffusion, a modified direct complement-fixation test, and enzyme-linked immunosorbent assay also have been used successfully to detect antibody for PPV.

== Evolution ==
These viruses appear to have evolved ~120 years ago with a rapid increase in their population size within the last 40–60 years. They appear to have evolved initially in wild boars and subsequently spread to domestic pigs. The rate of evolution has been estimated to be 3.86 × 10^{−4} – 8.23 × 10^{−4} substitutions per site per year. This rate is similar to other single stranded DNA viruses.

== Epidemiology ==
Porcine parvovirus is ubiquitous among swine throughout the world. In major swine-producing areas such as the midwestern United States, infection is enzootic in most herds, and with few exceptions sows are immune. In addition, a large proportion of gilts are naturally infected with PPV before they conceive, and as a result they develop an active immunity that probably persists throughout life. Collectively, the seroepidemiological data indicate that exposure to PPV is common. They also emphasize the high risk of infection and reproductive disease among gilts that have not developed immunity before conception. The most common routes of infection for postnatal and prenatal pigs are oronasal and transplacental respectively.

Pigs nursing immune dams absorb a high titer of antibody for PPV from colostrum. These titers decrease progressively with time by dilution as pigs grow as well as by biological degradation. They usually reach subdetectable levels in 3–6 months if sera are examined by the HI test. Sometimes passively acquired antibody persists for a longer interval. Moreover, levels of antibody too low to be detected by the HI test may be detected by the SN test. The primary significance of passively acquired antibody is that it interferes with the development of active immunity. High levels of such antibody can prevent infection, and lower levels can minimize dissemination from infected pigs. Consequently, some groups of gilts are not fully susceptible to infection and dissemination of virus until either shortly before conception or during early gestation.

Contaminated premises are probably major reservoirs of PPV. The virus is thermostable, is resistant to many common disinfectants, and may remain infectious for months in secretions and excretions from acutely infected pigs. It was shown experimentally that although pigs transmitted PPV for only about 2 weeks after exposure, the pens in which they were initially kept remained infectious for at least 4 months. The ubiquity of PPV also raises the possibility that some pigs are persistently infected and at least periodically shed virus. However, shedding beyond the interval of acute infection has not been demonstrated. The possibility of immunotolerant carriers of PPV as a result of early in utero infection has been suggested. When gilts were infected with PPV before day 55 of gestation, their pigs were born infected but without antibody. Virus was isolated from kidneys, testicles, and seminal fluid of such pigs killed at various times after birth up to the time they were 8 months of age; at which time the experiment was terminated. Results of another study, wherein dams were infected early in gestation and their pigs were born infected but without antibody, also suggest an acquired immunotolerance. A possible example of an infected, immunotolerant, sexually active boar was reported.

Boars may play a significant role in dissemination of PPV at a critical time. During acute infection the virus is shed by various routes, including semen, and the isolation of PPV from semen of naturally infected boars has been reported. Semen may be contaminated externally, as for example with viruscontaining feces, or within the male reproductive tract. The virus was isolated from a testicle of a boar 5 days after it was injected into the boar's prepuce and from testicles of boars killed 5 and 8 days after they were infected oronasally (Mengeling, unpublished data 1976). Virus was also isolated from scrotal lymph nodes of boars killed 5, 8, 15, 21, and 35 days after oronasal exposure. After day 8, isolation was accomplished by cocultivating lymph node fragments with fetal porcine kidney cells (Mengeling, unpublished data 1976). Irrespective of their immune status, boars can also function as a vehicle for mechanical dissemination of PPV among susceptible females.

== Pathogenesis ==
Dams are susceptible to PPV-induced reproductive failure if infected anytime during about the first half of gestation. This interval of maternal susceptibility is indicated by the collective results of several experimental studies, by in-depth epidemiological investigations, and by estimates of the time of death of fetuses collected during epidemiological surveys. Consequences of maternal infection during this interval are embryonic and fetal death followed by resorption and mummification respectively. Transplacental infection also follows maternal exposure after midgestation, but fetuses usually survive without obvious clinical effects in utero. The likely reason is that transplacental infection often requires 10–14 days or longer, and by 70 days of gestation most fetuses are able to develop a protective immunologic response to the virus. In general, fetuses experimentally infected by transuterine inoculation of the virus have died when infected before day 70 of gestation, but they have survived and produced antibody when infected later in gestation. A strain of PPV of slightly greater virulence also has been reported. The usual consequences of infection at different stages of gestation are summarized in Table 1.

When only part of a litter is infected transplacentally, as is often the case, one or more littermates are frequently infected by subsequent intrauterine spread of virus. The same would apply if initial infection were through contaminated semen. As a result, any combination or all of the sequelae indicated in Table 1 can develop in the same litter. Intrauterine dissemination is probably less common when early embryos are infected because they are quickly resorbed after death, effectively removing the intrauterine reservoir of virus. In such cases there is no evidence at farrowing for the cause of fewer pigs per litter.

Table 1. Consequences of infection with PPV at different intervals of gestation
Interval of Gestation(days)^{a}
Infection of Dam	Infection of Conceptus^{b}	Description of Conceptus	Consequences of Infection
≤56	10–30	Embryo	Death and resorption
	30–70	Fetus	Death and mummification
>56	70–term	Fetus	Immune response and usually survival in utero

^{a}Intervals are approximations.

^{b}Assuming transplacental infections 10–14 days after maternal exposure.

The effect, if any, of PPV on the ovum before ovulation is unknown. The virus adheres tenaciously to the external surface of the zona pellucida of the fertilized porcine ovum, and although it apparently cannot penetrate this layer, speculation is that it could pose a threat to the embryo after hatching.

Despite strong circumstantial evidence, a direct causal role of PPV-contaminated semen in reproductive failure has not been established unequivocally. The zona pellucida could protect the early embryo while local immunity is developing. Conversely, the virus may cause uterine changes incompatible with gestation. In any event, a female infected through semen provides a focus of infection for others.

With the possible exception of the uterine changes alluded to in the preceding paragraph, PPV-induced reproductive failure is caused by the direct effect of the virus on the conceptus. In the absence of an immune response, the virus replicates extensively throughout these tissues. By the time the conceptus dies, most of its cells contain large quantities of intracytoplasmic viral antigen that can be demonstrated by IF microscopy. The relative lack of nuclear fluorescence at the time of death, compared to earlier stages of the disease, indicates that when the conceptus is severely affected, mitotic activity and the associated conditions necessary for viral replication are suppressed more than phagocytic activity.

Death of the conceptus probably results from the collective damage by the virus to a variety of tissues and organs, including the placenta. However, in the absence of an immune response, changes in almost any vital organ are probably sufficient to eventually cause death. One of the most striking features of viral distribution is the extensive involvement of endothelium. This seems to preclude further development of the vascular network of the conceptus. Preparation for cellular mitosis (i.e., the S phase) results in concomitant viral replication and cell death. Damage to the fetal circulatory system is indicated by edema, hemorrhage, and the accumulation of large amounts of serosanguineous fluids in body cavities. Necrosis of the endothelium is microscopically evident.

The mechanism of transplacental infection has been investigated by using IF microscopy to identify infected cells in maternal and fetal tissues at progressively longer intervals after maternal oronasal exposure. Examination of tissues contiguous with the maternal-fetal junction revealed viral antigen in endothelial and mesenchymal cells of the chorion, with increasing involvement of these tissues at progressively later stages of gestation. Viral antigen was never detected unequivocally in either uterine epithelium or trophectoderm. Consequently, there was no evidence for maternalfetal transfer of the virus by replicating through these tissues. However, this route cannot be excluded, since only a small part of the total area of contact was examined. Transfer of the virus within macrophages has been considered. Whatever the route, maternal viremia seems a likely prerequisite for transplacental infection.

== Lesions ==
Neither macroscopic nor microscopic lesions have been reported for nonpregnant pigs. It is conceivable that cellular infiltrations subsequently described for fetuses could be induced by infection during the perinatal interval.

Macroscopic lesions have not been reported in pregnant dams; however, microscopic lesions have been seen in tissues of gilts killed after their fetuses were infected by transuterine inoculation of virus. Gilts that were seronegative when their fetuses were infected at 70 days of gestation had focal accumulations of mononuclear cells adjacent to the endometrium and in deeper layers of the lamina propria when they were killed 12 and 21 days later. In addition, there were perivascular cuffs of plasma cells and lymphocytes in the brain, spinal cord, and choroid of the eye. When fetuses were infected earlier in gestation (35, 50, and 60 days) and their dams were killed 7 and 11 days later, the lesions were similar. However, uterine lesions were more severe and also included extensive cuffing of myometrial and endometrial vessels with mononuclear cells. Only focal accumulations of lymphocytes were seen in uteruses of gilts that were seropositive when their fetuses were infected.

Macroscopic changes of embryos are death followed by resorption of fluids (Fig. 4) and then soft tissues (Fig. 5). Virus and viral antigen are widely distributed in tissues of infected embryos and their placentas, and it is probable that microscopic lesions of necrosis and vascular damage, subsequently described for fetuses, also develop in advanced embryos.

There are numerous macroscopic changes in fetuses infected before they become immunocompetent (Fig. 6). These include a variable degree of stunting and sometimes an obvious loss of condition before other external changes are apparent; occasionally, an increased prominence of blood vessels over the surface of the fetus due to congestion and leakage of blood into contiguous tissues; congestion, edema, and hemorrhage with accumulation of serosanguineous fluids in body cavities; hemorrhagic discoloration becoming progressively darker after death; and dehydration (mummification). Many of these changes also apply to the placenta. Microscopic lesions consist primarily of extensive cellular necrosis in a wide variety of tissues and organs (Fig. 7A). Inflammation and intranuclear inclusions also have been described.

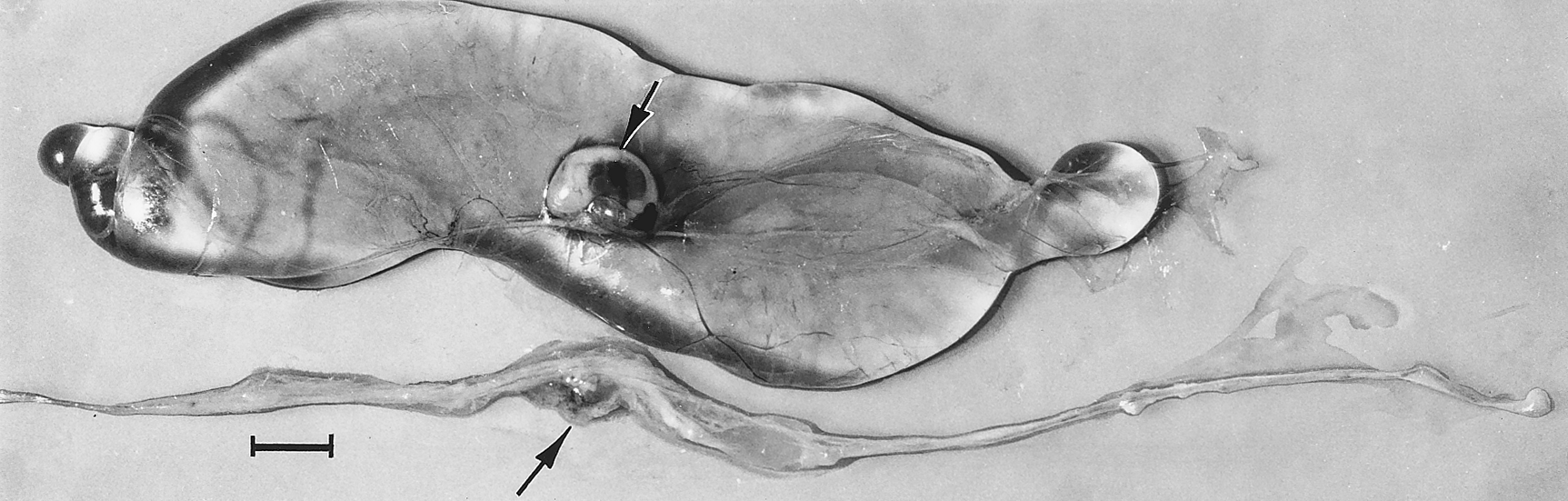
Figure 4. Embryos from a gilt experimentally infected oronasally immediately after breeding and killed 22 days later. Bar = 1 cm. (Top) Noninfected, clinically normal embryo (arrow) and associated extraembryonic membranes; (bottom) PPV-infected, dead littermate embryo (arrow) and associated extraembryonic membranes, recent death, no obvious resorption of soft tissues.

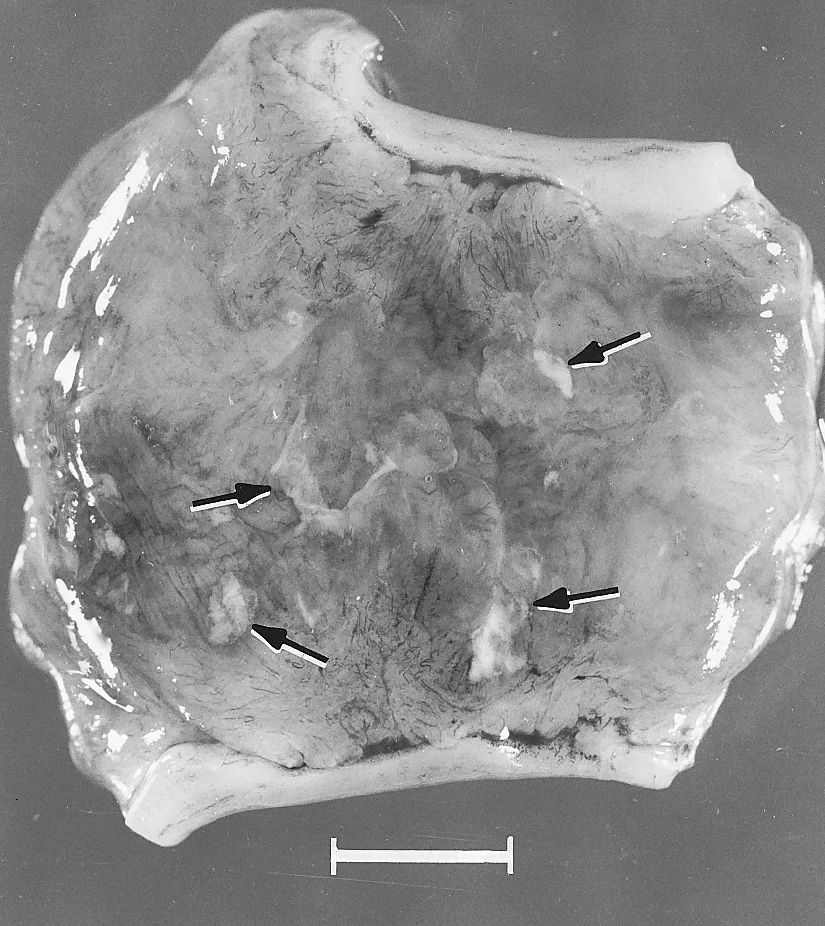
Figure 5. Segment of uterus opened to show necrotic remnants of a partially resorbed PPV-infected embryo (arrows) and associated extraembryonic membranes of a gilt experimentally infected oronasally immediately after breeding and killed 22 days later; remnants are laden with virus and viral antigen. Bar = 1 cm.

In contrast, macroscopic changes have not been reported for fetuses infected after they become immunocompetent for PPV. Microscopic lesions are primarily endothelial hypertrophy and mononuclear cell infiltrations consistent with an immune response. Meningoencephalitis characterized by perivascular cuffing with proliferating adventitial cells, histiocytes, and a few plasma cells was seen in the gray and white matter of the cerebrum and in the leptomeninges of PPV-infected stillborn pigs. These lesions were believed to be pathognomonic for PPV infection. Similar lesions have been observed in PPV-infected, live fetuses collected late in gestation (Fig. 7B).

Both general types of microscopic lesions (i.e., necrosis and mononuclear cell infiltration) may develop in fetuses infected near midgestation when the immune response is insufficient to provide protection.

== Diagnosis ==
PPV should be considered in a differential diagnosis of reproductive failure of swine whenever there is evidence of embryonic or fetal death or both. The pathologic sequelae of maternal infection during gestation have been described (see the section on clinical signs). If gilts but not sows are affected, maternal illness is not seen during gestation, there are few or no abortions or fetal developmental anomalies, and other evidence suggests an infectious disease, then a tentative diagnosis of PPV-induced reproductive failure can be made. The relative lack of maternal illness, abortions, and fetal developmental anomalies differentiates PPV from most other infectious causes of reproductive failure. However, a definitive diagnosis requires laboratory support.

Several mummified fetuses (<16 cm in length) or lungs from such fetuses, if sufficiently developed, should be submitted to the diagnostic laboratory. Larger mummified fetuses (i.e., more than about 70 days of gestational age), stillborn pigs, and neonatal pigs are not recommended for submission unless they are the only samples available. If infected, their tissues will usually contain antibody that interferes with laboratory tests for either virus or viral antigen.

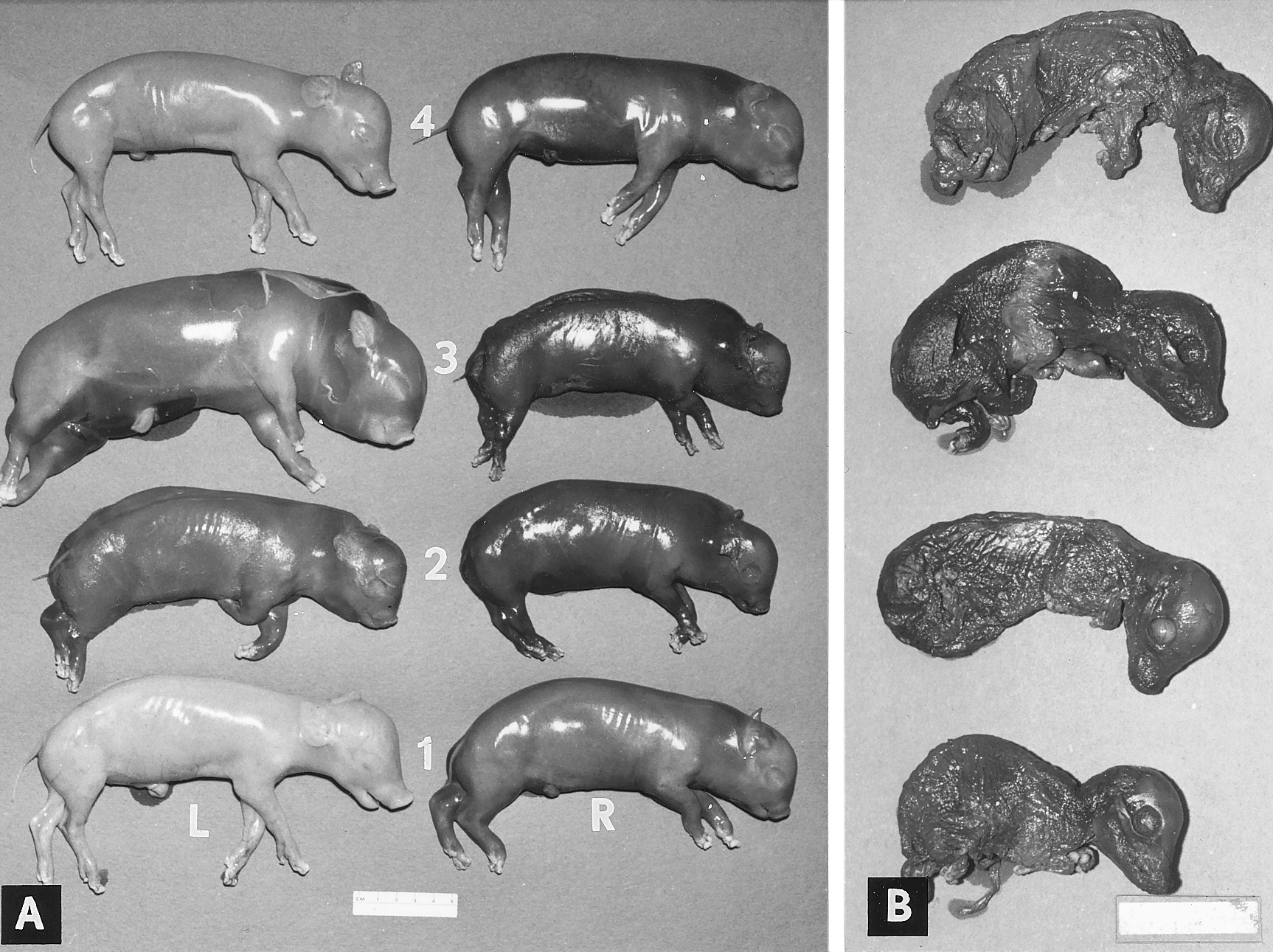
Figure 6. PPV-infected fetuses. Bars = 5 cm. (A) Litter of a gilt experimentally infected oronasally on day 47 of gestation and killed 34 days later; fetuses from left (L) and right (R) horn of uterus, numbered 1–4 from cervix toward ovary; fetuses L1 and L4 stunted but alive at necropsy, fetus L3 recently dead, others later stages. (B) Fetuses from litter of a naturally infected gilt, collected at about 114 days of gestation, advanced stage of dehydration (mummification).

If females fail to farrow despite being anestrus and are sent to an abattoir, their uteruses should be collected and examined for affected fetuses. Sometimes only remnants of fetal tissues remain when fetuses die early in the middle third of gestation. Nevertheless, these are adequate samples if tested for viral antigen by IF microscopy. The absence of affected fetuses or fetal remnants does not exclude PPV-induced reproductive failure. When all embryos of a litter die and are completely resorbed after the first few weeks of gestation, the dam may remain endocrinologically pregnant and not return to estrus until after the expected time of farrowing.

Identification of viral antigen by IF microscopy is a reliable and sensitive diagnostic procedure. Sections of fetal tissues are prepared with a cryostat microtome and are then reacted with standardized reagents. The test can be completed within a few hours. In the absence of a fetal antibody response, antigen is seen throughout fetal tissues (Fig. 8A, B); even when antibody is present, infected cells usually can be detected in fetal lung (Fig. 8C).

Detection of viral hemagglutinin also has been recommended as a diagnostic technique. Tissues are triturated in diluent and then sedimented by centrifugation. The supernatant fluid is tested for agglutinating activity for guinea pig erythrocytes. This test requires a minimum of laboratory equipment and is effective in the absence of antibody.

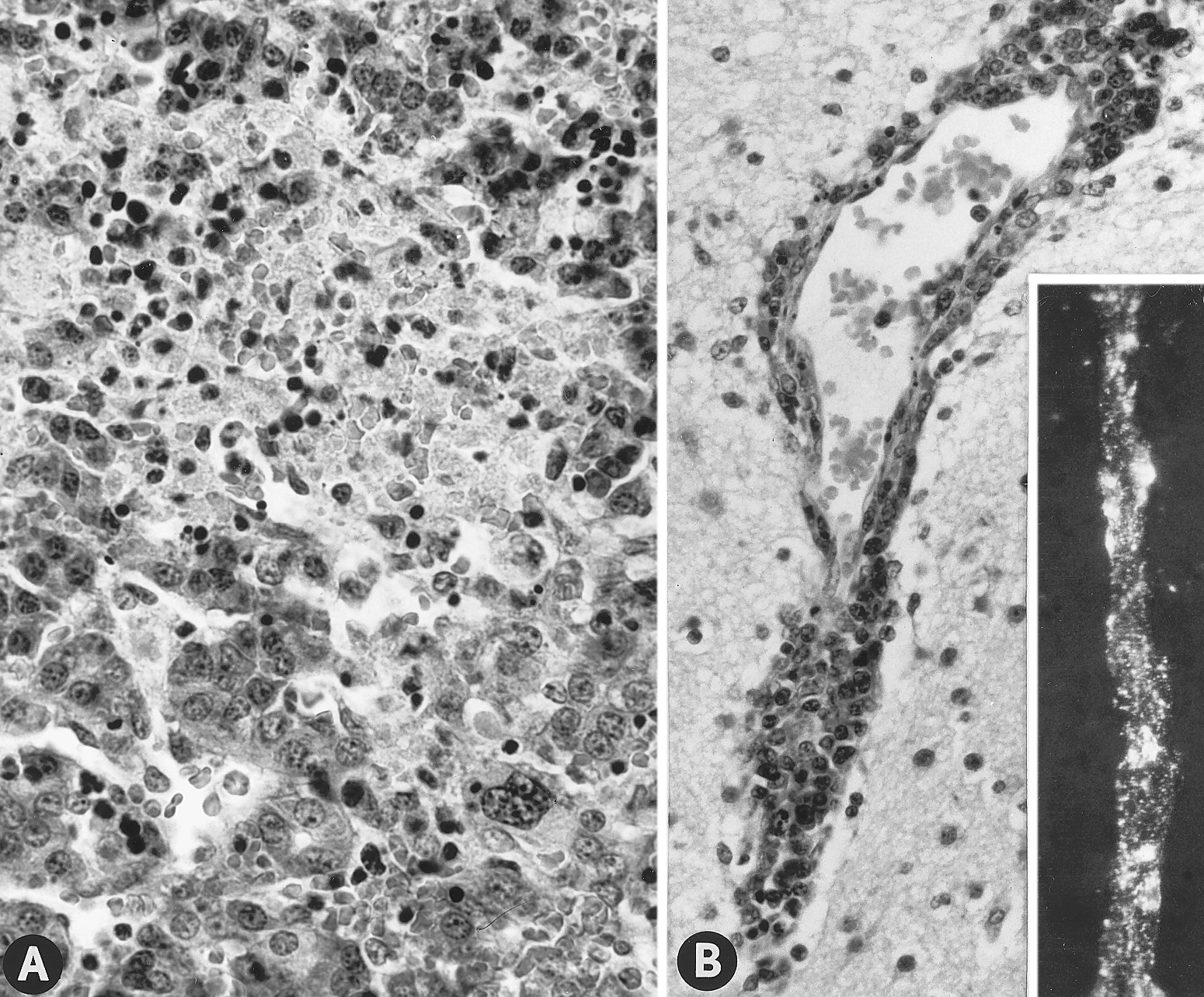
Figure 7. Tissues of PPV-infected fetuses of gilts experimentally infected oronasally. (A) Necrotic focus in liver of live fetus of a gilt infected on day 40 of gestation and killed 42 days later; fetus had numerous macroscopic lesions (H&E; ×400). (B) Perivascular cuffing with mononuclear cells in cerebrum of live fetus, littermate of A; fetus had no macroscopic lesions (H&E; ×320). (Insert) Viral antigen associated with endothelium of cerebral vessel of fetus of a gilt infected on day 46 of gestation and killed 25 days later (IF microscopy; ×312.5). All fetuses were probably infected by intrauterine spread of PPV from transplacentally infected littermates. (Photographs A and B courtesy of T. T. Brown Jr., National Animal Disease Center.)

Virus isolation is less suitable as a routine diagnostic procedure than either of the aforementioned tests. Infectivity is slowly but progressively lost after fetal death; as a result, isolation of virus from mummified fetuses that have died as a result of infection is sometimes unsuccessful. Moreover, the procedure is time-consuming, and contamination is a constant threat because of the stability of PPV in the laboratory and because cell cultures are sometimes unknowingly prepared from infected tissues. IF microscopy is often used to determine whether PPV has been isolated in cell culture.

In general, serologic procedures are recommended for diagnosis only when tissues from mummified fetuses are not available for testing as previously described. Results with maternal sera are of value if antibody is not detected, thus excluding PPV as a cause, and if samples collected at intervals reveal seroconversion for PPV coincident with reproductive failure. Because PPV is ubiquitous, the presence of antibody in a single sample is otherwise meaningless. However, a determination of relative amounts of antibody present as immunoglobulin M and G can indicate the recency of infection. Detection of antibody in sera of fetuses and stillborn pigs and in sera collected from neonatal pigs before they nurse is evidence of in utero infection, since maternal antibody does not cross the maternal-fetal junction. When serum is not available, body fluids collected from fetuses or their viscera that have been kept in a plastic bag overnight at 4?C have been used successfully to demonstrate antibody.

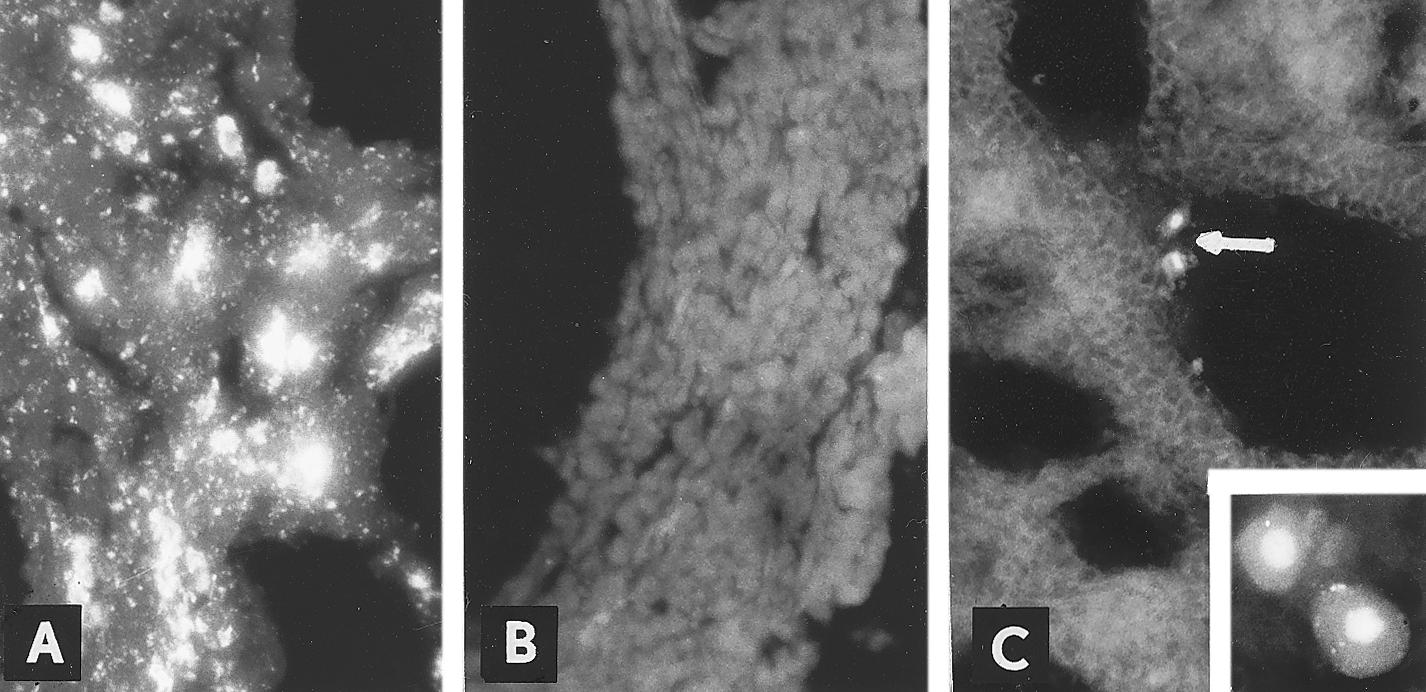
Figure 8. Cryostat-microtome sections of lungs of PPV-infected fetuses examined by IF microscopy. (A) Lung of mummified fetus reacted with FA plus nonimmune serum (×312.5). (B) Replicate section reacted with FA plus PPV-immune serum (i.e., blocking control) (×312.5). (C) Lung of live fetus with HI antibody titer of 640 reacted with fluorescent antibodies (FA) plus nonimmune serum, two infected cells (arrow) (× 162.5). (Insert) Two similar infected cells in the same section as C (×500).

== Treatment and prevention ==
There is no treatment for PPV-induced reproductive failure.

Gilts should be either naturally infected with PPV or vaccinated for PPV before they are bred. To promote natural infection, a common practice is to arrange contact between seronegative gilts and seropositive sows, with the expectation that one or more of the sows will be shedding virus. Moving gilts to a potentially contaminated area, either currently or recently inhabited by seropositive swine, also can be recommended. Once infection is started, the virus spreads rapidly among fully susceptible swine. Just how effective these procedures are in increasing the incidence of natural infection is unknown. For whatever reasons, infection is common, and probably well over one-half of all gilts in areas where PPV is enzootic are infected before they are bred for the first time.

The use of vaccine is the only way to ensure that gilts develop active immunity before conception. Both inactivated and modified live-virus (MLV) vaccines have been developed. An inactivated vaccine has been tested under field conditions, and both types of vaccines were effective when tested under controlled laboratory conditions.

Vaccines should be administered several weeks before conception to provide immunity throughout the susceptible period of gestation but after the disappearance of passively acquired colostral antibody, which could interfere with the development of active immunity. These limits may define a very brief interval for effective vaccination of gilts that are bred before 7 months of age. Although inactivated vaccine provides maximum safety, there is experimental evidence that PPV can be sufficiently attenuated so that it is unlikely to cause reproductive failure even if inadvertently administered during gestation. The apparent safety of MLV vaccine may be due to its reduced ability to replicate in tissues of the intact host and cause the level of viremia needed for transplacental infection. Moreover, it has been shown by transuterine inoculation of both virulent and attenuated virus that a much larger dose of attenuated virus is required to establish infection of fetuses. Duration of immunity following vaccination is unknown; however, in one study antibody titers were maintained for at least 4 months after administration of an inactivated vaccine. Low levels of antibody found to be protective allow speculation that, once the immune system has been primed with PPV, subsequent exposure to virulent virus during gestation is unlikely to result in transplacental infection even if antibody from vaccination is no longer detected.

Vaccination is recommended also for seronegative sows and boars. Seronegative sows are usually found only in PPV-free herds; in such cases, inactivated vaccine is indicated. Experience has shown that few herds can be expected to remain free of PPV even if access is carefully controlled. Introduction of PPV into a totally susceptible herd can be disastrous. Vaccination of boars should reduce their involvement in dissemination of the virus.

Vaccines are used extensively in the United States and in several other countries where PPV has been recognized as an economically important cause of reproductive failure. All federally licensed vaccines marketed in the United States are inactivated.

== See also ==
- SMEDI
