= Kodecyte =

Modified living cell

A kodecyte (ko•de•cyte) is a living cell that has been modified (koded) by the incorporation of one or more function-spacer-lipid constructs (FSL constructs) to gain a new or novel biological, chemical or technological function. The cell is modified by the lipid tail of the FSL construct incorporating into the bilipid membrane of the cell.

All kodecytes retain their normal vitality and functionality while gaining the new function of the inserted FSL constructs. The combination of dispersibility in biocompatible media, spontaneous incorporation into cell membranes, and apparent low toxicity, makes FSL constructs suitable as research tools and for the development of new diagnostic and therapeutic applications.

== The technology ==
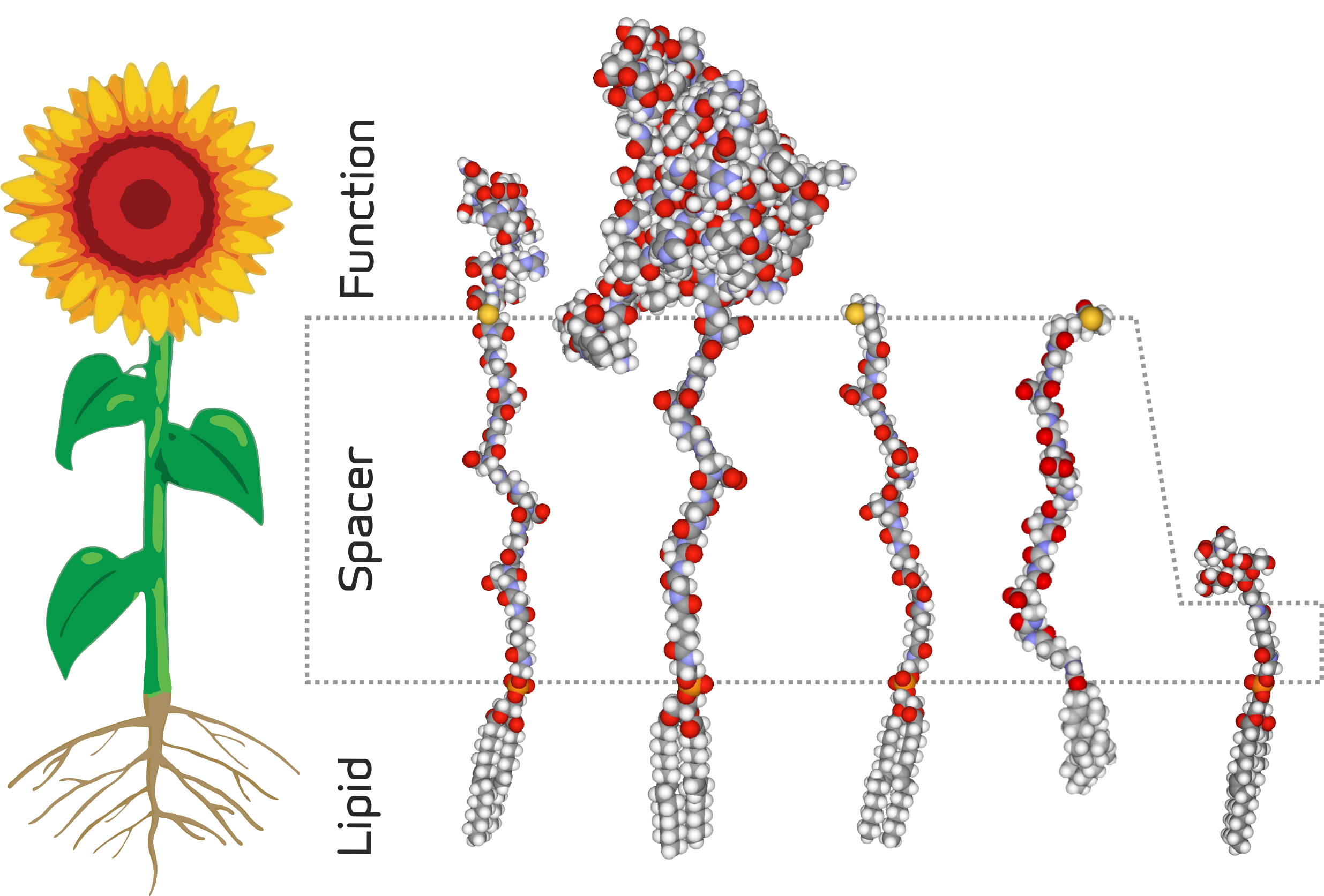
Structural analogy of a sunflower to space filling models of selected FSL constructs. The two FSL constructs on the left are FSL-peptides based on partially carboxymethylated oligoglycine (CMG2) spacers with 1,2- dioleoyl-sn-glycero-3-phosphoethanolamine (DOPE) lipids. The 3rd and 4th constructs are FSL-biotin based on CMG but with DOPE and sterol (δ-oxycarbonylaminovaleric acid derivative of cholesterol) lipids, respectively. The final FSL construct is a typical trisaccharide, conjugated via an O(CH_{2})_{3}NH spacer to an activated adipate derivative of the diacyl lipid DOPE.

Kode FSL constructs consist of three components; a functional moiety (F), a spacer (S) and a lipid (L).

Function groups on FSL constructs that can be used to create kodecytes include saccharides (including ABO blood group-related determinants, sialic acids, hyaluronin polysaccharides), fluorophores, biotin, and a range of peptides.

Although kodecytes are created by modifying natural cells, they are different from natural cells. For example, FSL constructs, influenced by the composition of the lipid tail, are laterally mobile in the membrane and some FSL constructs may also cluster due to the characteristics of the functional group (F). As FSL constructs are anchored in the membrane via a lipid tail (L) it is believed they do not participate in signal transduction, but may be designed to act as agonists or antagonists of the initial binding event. FSL constructs will not actively pass through the plasma membrane but may enter the cell via membrane invagination and endocytosis.

The "koding" of cells is stable (subject to the rate of turnover of the membrane components). FSL constructs will remain in the membrane of inactive cells (e.g. red blood cells) for the life of the cell provided it is stored in lipid free media. In the peripheral circulation FSL constructs are observed to be lost from red cell kodecytes at a rate of about 1% per hour. The initial "koding" dose and the minimum level required for detection determine how long the presence of "kodecytes" in the circulation can be monitored. For red blood "kodecytes" reliable monitoring of the presence of the "kodecytes" for up to 3 days post intravenous administration has been demonstrated in small mammals.

The spacer (S) of a FSL construct has been selected so as to have negligible cross-reactivity with serum antibodies so kodecytes can be used with undiluted serum. By increasing the length of the FSL spacer from 1.9 to 7.2 nm it has been shown sensitivity can improve two-fold in red cell agglutination based kodecyte assays. However, increasing the size of the spacer further from 7.2 to 11.5 nm did not result in any further enhancement.

A plasma membrane modified with FSL constructs (by analogy to sunflower), creating a kodecyte membrane.

=== Technology Video ===
To view a simple video explaining how Kode Technology works, click the following link: https://www.youtube.com/watch?v=TIbjAl5KYpA

== Methodology ==
Preparation of kodecytes. Simply mix cells with an FSL solution (containing 1 or more FSLs) and incubate for 10–120 minutes at 37 °C (or at temperatures as low as 4 °C). The constructs will spontaneously incorporate into the membrane and no further steps are required.

FSL constructs, when in solution (saline) and in contact, will spontaneously incorporate into cell membranes. The methodology involves simply preparing a solution of FSL constructs in the range of 1–1000 μg/mL, with the concentration used determining the amount of antigen present on the kodecyte. The ability to control antigen levels on the outside of a kodecyte has allowed for manufacture of quality control sensitivity systems and serologic teaching kits incorporating the entire range of serologic agglutination reactions. The actual concentration will depend on the construct and the quantity of construct required in the membrane. One part of FSL solution is added to one part of cells (up to 100% suspension) and they are incubated at a set temperature within the range of 4–37 °C (39–99 °F) depending on temperature compatibility of the cells being modified. The higher the temperature, the faster the rate of FSL insertion into the membrane. For red blood cells incubation for 2 hours at 37 °C achieves >95% FSL insertion with at least 50% insertion being achieved within 20 minutes. In general, for carbohydrate based FSLs insertion into red blood cells, incubation for 4 hours at room temperature or 20 hours at 4 °C are similar to one hour at 37 °C. The resultant kodecytes do not required to be washed, however this option should be considered if an excess of FSL construct is used in the "koding process".

Kodecytes can also be created in vivo by injection of constructs directly into the circulation. However this process will modify all cells in contact with the constructs and usually require significantly more construct than in vitro preparation, as FSL constructs will preferentially associate with free lipids. The in vivo creation of kodecytes is untargeted and FSL constructs will insert into all cells non-specifically, but may show a preference for some cell types.

Diagnostic serological analyses including flow cytometry and scanning electron microscopy usually can't see a difference between "kodecytes" and unmodified cells. However, when compared with natural cells there does appear to be a difference between IgM and IgG antibody reactivities when the functional group (F) is a monomeric peptide antigen. IgM antibodies appear to react poorly with kodecytes made with FSL peptides. Furthermore, FSL constructs may have a restricted antigen/epitope and may not react with a monoclonal antibody unless the FSL construct and monoclonal antibody are complementary.

Kodecytes can be studied using standard histological techniques. Kodecytes can be fixed after "koding" subject to the functional moiety (F) of the FSL construct being compatible with the fixative. However, freeze cut or formalin-fixed freeze cut tissues are required because the lipid based FSL constructs (and other glycolipids) will be leached from the "kodecytes" in paraffin imbedded samples during the deparaffination steps.

== Nomenclature ==
Koded membranes are described by the construct and the concentration of FSL (in μg/mL) used to create them. For example, kodecytes created with a 100 μg/mL solution of FSL-A would be termed A100 kodecytes. If multiple FSL constructs were used then the definition is expanded accordingly, e.g. A100+B300 kodecytes are created with a solution containing 100 μg/mL solution of FSL-A and 300 μg/mL solution of FSL-B. The "+" symbol is used to separate the construct mixes, e.g. A100+B300. If FSL concentrations are constant then the μg/mL component of the terminology can be dropped, e.g. A kodecytes. Alternatively unrelated constructs such as FSL-A and FSL-biotin will create A+biotin kodecytes, etc. If different cells are used in the same study then inclusion of the cell type into the name is recommended, e.g. RBC A100 kodecytes vs WBC A100 kodecytes, or platelet A100 kodecytes, etc.

== Applications ==
Kode Technology has been used for the in vitro modification of murine embryos, spermatozoa, zebra fish, epithelial/endometrial cells and red blood cells to create cellular quality controls systems, serologic kits (teaching), rare antigen expression, add infectious markers onto cells, modified cell adhesion/interaction/separation/immobilisation, and labelling. It has also been intravascularly infused for in vivo modification of blood cells and neutralisation of circulating antibodies and in in vivo imaging of circulating bone marrow kodecytes in zebrafish. Kode FSL constructs have also been applied to non-biological surfaces such as modified cellulose, paper, silica, polymers, natural fibers, glass and metals and has been shown to be ultra-fast in labelling these surfaces.

== See also ==
- Function-Spacer-Lipid construct
- Kodevirion
