= Transfusion-related immunomodulation =

Effect following blood transfusion

Transfusion-related immunomodulation (TRIM) refers to the transient depression of the immune system following transfusion of blood products. This effect has been recognized in groups of individuals who have undergone kidney transplantation or have had multiple miscarriages. Some research studies have shown that, because of this immune depression, blood transfusions increase the risk of infections and cancer recurrence. However, other studies have not shown these differences and the degree of impact transfusion has on infection and tumor recurrence is not well understood. The Blood Products Advisory Committee of the Food and Drug Administration recommends that all transfused blood products undergo leukocyte reduction in order to offset the contribution of donor white blood cells to immune suppression.
