= Nitro blue tetrazolium chloride =

Names
- IUPAC name 2,2'-bis(4-Nitrophenyl)-5,5'-diphenyl-3,3'-(3,3'-dimethoxy-4,4'-diphenylene)ditetrazolium chloride

Identifiers
CAS Number	298-83-9
3D model (JSmol)	Interactive image
ChEBI	CHEBI:9505
ChEMBL	ChEMBL403063
ChemSpider	8924
ECHA InfoCard	100.005.517
PubChem CID	9281
UNII	X44P41F7ZK
CompTox Dashboard (EPA)	DTXSID6046719
- InChI: InChI=1S/C40H30N10O6.2ClH/c1-55-37-25-29(13-23-35(37)47-43-39(27-9-5-3-6-10-27)41-45(47)31-15-19-33(20-16-31)49(51)52)30-14-24-36(38(26-30)56-2)48-44-40(28-11-7-4-8-12-28)42-46(48)32-17-21-34(22-18-32)50(53)54;;/h3-26H,1-2H3;2*1H/q+2;;/p-2 Key: FSVCQIDHPKZJSO-UHFFFAOYSA-L; InChI=1/C40H30N10O6.2ClH/c1-55-37-25-29(13-23-35(37)47-43-39(27-9-5-3-6-10-27)41-45(47)31-15-19-33(20-16-31)49(51)52)30-14-24-36(38(26-30)56-2)48-44-40(28-11-7-4-8-12-28)42-46(48)32-17-21-34(22-18-32)50(53)54;;/h3-26H,1-2H3;2*1H/q+2;;/p-2 Key: FSVCQIDHPKZJSO-NUQVWONBAE
- SMILES: [Cl-].[Cl-].[O-][N+](=O)c1ccc(cc1)n2nc(n[n+]2c3ccc(cc3OC)c7ccc([n+]5nc(nn5c4ccc([N+]([O-])=O)cc4)c6ccccc6)c(OC)c7)c8ccccc8

Properties
Chemical formula	C_{40}H_{30}Cl_{2}N_{10}O_{6}
Molar mass	817.64 g/mol
Appearance	yellow crystalline powder
Melting point	200 °C (392 °F; 473 K)

Hazards
- Occupational safety and health (OHS/OSH)
Main hazards	may be reactive based on presence of tetrazole group, nitro group and contiguous nitrogen atoms
Flash point	not available
- Lethal dose or concentration (LD, LC)
LD_{50} (median dose)	2 g/kg
- Except where otherwise noted, data are given for materials in their standard state (at 25 °C [77 °F], 100 kPa). verify (what is ?) Infobox references

Nitro blue tetrazolium is a chemical compound composed of two tetrazole moieties. It is used in immunology for sensitive detection of alkaline phosphatase (with BCIP). NBT serves as the oxidant and BCIP is the AP-substrate (and gives also dark blue dye).

== Clinical significance ==
In immunohistochemistry the alkaline phosphatase is often used as a marker, conjugated to an antibody. The colored product can either be of the NBT/BCIP reaction reveals where the antibody is bound, or can be used in immunofluorescence.

The NBT/BCIP reaction is also used for colorimetric/spectrophotometric activity assays of oxidoreductases. One application is in activity stains in gel electrophoresis, such as with the mitochondrial electron transport chain complexes.

Nitro blue tetrazolium is used in a diagnostic test, particularly for chronic granulomatous disease and other diseases of phagocyte function. When there is an NADPH oxidase defect, the phagocyte is unable to make reactive oxygen species or radicals required for bacterial killing. As a result, bacteria may thrive within the phagocyte. The higher the blue score, the better the cell is at producing reactive oxygen species.
