= Forecast Systems Laboratory =

Former US weather agency

The Forecast Systems Laboratory (FSL) was a meteorological research and development laboratory in the National Oceanic and Atmospheric Administration (NOAA)/Office of Oceanic and Atmospheric Research (OAR). In October 2005, it was merged with five other NOAA labs to form the Earth System Research Laboratories.

FSL conducted applied meteorological research and development to improve and create short-term warning and weather forecast systems, models, and observing technology. Supercomputing and other leading-edge technology are used in these applications. FSL then transferred these new scientific and technological advances to its clients which include NOAA's National Weather Service, the commercial and general aviation communities, the United States Air Force, many foreign weather forecasting services, and various private interests.
