= 5-Bromo-4-chloro-3-indolyl phosphate =

BCIP

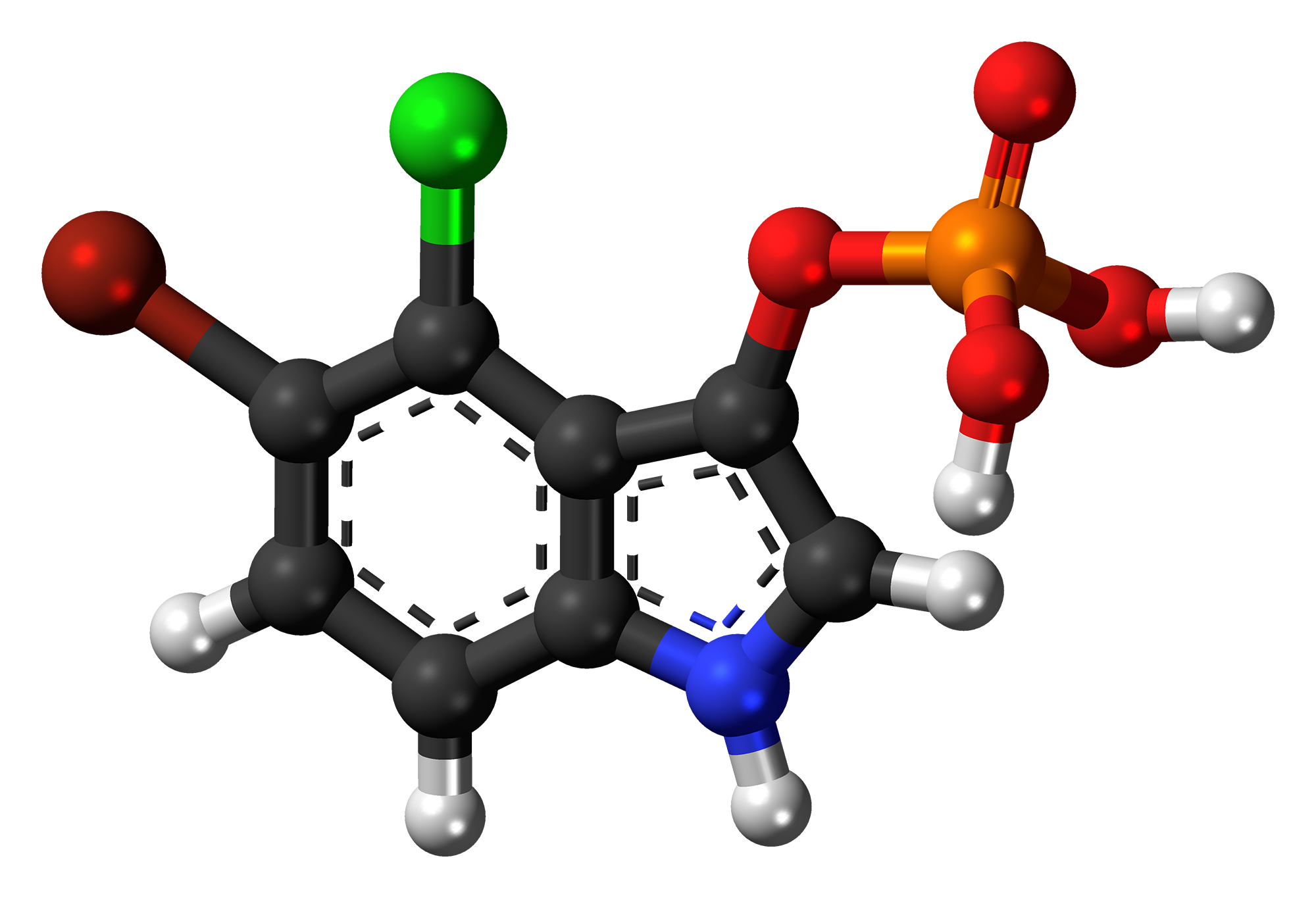

Names
- Preferred IUPAC name 5-Bromo-4-chloro-1H-indol-3-yl dihydrogen phosphate
- Other names BCIP

Identifiers
CAS Number	38404-93-2
3D model (JSmol)	Interactive image
ChemSpider	58873
PubChem CID	65409
UNII	BZ64NZV99J
CompTox Dashboard (EPA)	DTXSID40191744
- InChI: InChI=1S/C8H6BrClNO4P/c9-4-1-2-5-7(8(4)10)6(3-11-5)15-16(12,13)14/h1-3,11H,(H2,12,13,14) Key: QRXMUCSWCMTJGU-UHFFFAOYSA-N; InChI=1/C8H6BrClNO4P/c9-4-1-2-5-7(8(4)10)6(3-11-5)15-16(12,13)14/h1-3,11H,(H2,12,13,14) Key: QRXMUCSWCMTJGU-UHFFFAOYAN
- SMILES: C1=CC(=C(C2=C1NC=C2OP(=O)(O)O)Cl)Br

Properties
Chemical formula	C_{8}H_{6}BrClNO_{4}P
Molar mass	326.47 g·mol^{−1}
Appearance	Colorless
Solubility in water	soluble in water (sodium salt)
- Except where otherwise noted, data are given for materials in their standard state (at 25 °C [77 °F], 100 kPa). verify (what is ?) Infobox references

5-Bromo-4-chloro-3-indolyl phosphate (BCIP, X-phosphate, XP) is an artificial chromogenic substrate used for the sensitive colorimetric detection of alkaline phosphatase activity. It is, for example, used in immunoblotting, in situ hybridization, and immunohistochemistry, often in combination with nitro blue tetrazolium chloride (NBT). 5-bromo-4-chloro-3-indoxyl is oxidized by atmospheric oxygen to form the blue dye 5,5′-dibromo-4,4′-dichloro-indigo. It is also oxidized by nitroblue tetrazolium (NBT), which forms an insoluble dark blue diformazan precipitate after reduction. Alkaline phosphatase is commonly conjugated to secondary antibodies.
