= Infectivity =

Pathogen's ability to infect hosts

In epidemiology, infectivity is the ability of a pathogen to establish an infection. More specifically, infectivity is the extent to which the pathogen can enter, survive, and multiply in a host. It is measured by the ratio of the number of people who become infected to the total number exposed to the pathogen.

Infectivity has been shown to positively correlate with virulence, in plants. This means that as a pathogen's ability to infect a greater number of hosts increases, so does the level of harm it brings to the host.

A pathogen's infectivity is different from its transmissibility, which refers to a pathogen's capacity to pass from one organism to another.

== See also ==
- Basic reproduction number (basic reproductive rate, basic reproductive ratio, R_{0}, or r nought)
