= List of disabled human pseudogenes =

This is a list of human pseudogenes that are known to be disabled genes.

- NCF1C pseudogene, associated with a type of white blood cell. It is related to NCF1. It may disable NCF1 by recombination, leading to chronic granulomatous disease.
- GULO pseudogene, associated with the production of Vitamin C
- hHaA pseudogene, associated with fur-like body hair: see hypertrichosis
- DEFT1P pseudogene, associated with the immune system
- HTR5BP pseudogene, associated with a variant of the 5-HT5 receptor.
- Urate oxidase pseudogene, associated with the processing of uric acid
- Photolyase pseudogene, associated with repairing DNA damaged by UV radiation.
  - Photolyase is no longer encoded for despite obvious advantages. Instead, this gene is mutated to encode for cryptochromes.
- TLR12P pseudogene, encodes a toll-like receptor. In mice, this gene recognizes profilin. It has also been duplicated in mice into TLR11 (recognizes profilin, bacterial flagellin). TLR13 (recognizes bacterial ribosomal RNA) is another lost TLR, albeit with no apparent pseudogene.

Dubious pseudogenes:

- WNT3A. It does encode a functional protein in humans, but has no apparent consequence upon mutation. In mice, loss of the gene causes tail shortening loss.

Resurrected pseudogenes:

- IRGM, associated with the immune system
