= NCF1C =

Pseudogene in the species Homo sapiens

Identifiers
- Aliases: NCF1C, SH3PXD1C, neutrophil cytosolic factor 1C pseudogene
- External IDs: GeneCards: NCF1C; OMA:NCF1C - orthologs

Gene location (Human)
Chr.	Chromosome 7 (human)
Band	7q11.23	Start	75,156,639 bp
Band	7q11.23	End	75,172,044 bp
Orthologs
Species	Human	Mouse
Entrez	654817	n/a
Ensembl	ENSG00000165178	n/a
UniProt	n a	n/a
RefSeq (mRNA)	n/a	n/a
RefSeq (protein)	n/a	n/a
Location (UCSC)	Chr 7: 75.16 – 75.17 Mb	n/a
PubMed search		n/a
- Wikidata
View/Edit Human

NCF1C is a human pseudogene related to NCF1 (neutrophil cytosol factor 1), the latter being responsible for encoding the 47 kDA cytosolic subunit of NADPH oxidase. In chronic granulomatous disease, the functional NCF1 gene recombines with the two nearby pseudogenes (NCF1B, NCF1C) and becomes inactivated.
