= FRG2B =

Human gene

Identifiers
- Aliases: FRG2B, FSHD region gene 2 family member B
- External IDs: MGI: 3648470; GeneCards: FRG2B

Gene location (Human)
Chr.	Chromosome 10 (human)
Band	10q26.3	Start	133,623,895 bp
Band	10q26.3	End	133,626,795 bp
RNA expression pattern
Bgee	Human / Mouse (ortholog); Top expressed in: right hemisphere of cerebellum; Brodmann area 9; endometrium; superior frontal gyrus; right frontal lobe; primary visual cortex; anterior cingulate cortex; left ovary; C1 segment; human kidney / n/a; More reference expression data
BioGPS	n/a
Orthologs
Databases	NCBI: entry; OMA: entry
Species	Human	Mouse
Entrez	441581	622052
Ensembl	ENSG00000225899	n/a
UniProt	Q96QU4	n/a
RefSeq (mRNA)	NM_001080998	XM_886462
RefSeq (protein)	NP_001074467	n/a
Location (UCSC)	Chr 10: 133.62 – 133.63 Mb	n/a
PubMed search
- Wikidata
View/Edit Human	View/Edit Mouse

FRG2B (FSHD Region Gene 2 Family Member B) is a human gene located on chromosome 10 (cytoband 10q26.3). Its function is unknown.
