= Carbohydrate dehydrogenase =

Class of enzymes

Carbohydrate dehydrogenases are a group of dehydrogenase enzymes that occur in many organisms and facilitate the conversion from a carbohydrate to an aldehyde, lactone, or ketose.

Carbohydrate dehydrogenases are the most common quinoprotein oxidoreductases, which are enzymes that oxidize a wide range of molecules.

An example includes L-gulonolactone oxidase.

They are categorized under EC number 1.1. More specifically, they are in three subcodes: 1, 2, and 99, categorized as follows:

- EC 1.1.1 With NAD or NADP as acceptor
- EC 1.1.2 With a cytochrome as acceptor
- EC 1.1.99 With other acceptors
