= Bernard Babior =

American physician (1935–2004)

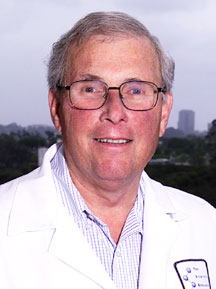
- Born: November 10, 1935
- Died: June 29, 2004 (aged 68); San Diego, California
- Education: Harvard University
- Scientific career
- Fields: Hematology
- Workplaces: The Scripps Research Institute

Bernard Macy Babior (November 10, 1935 – June 29, 2004) was an American physician and research biochemist.

Born in Los Angeles, he received his M.D. degree at the University of California, San Francisco . After interning at Peter Bent Brigham Hospital, he joined the laboratory of Konrad Bloch at Harvard University and was awarded a Ph.D. degree in 1965. He received further training at The National Institutes of Health, Harvard University and Tufts University In 1986 he moved to California as staff physician at Scripps Clinic, and Head of the Division of Biochemistry at The Scripps Research Institute.

Early in his career, while studying a vitamin B_{12}-dependent enzyme, Babior recognized that free radicals might play an important role in biologic processes. He showed that superoxide, a highly reactive oxygen derivative, was produced by white blood cell NADPH oxidase as a mechanism to kill invading bacteria. As such, Babior was able to explain the etiology of a rare genetic highly fatal immunodeficiency disease, Chronic granulomatous disease, whereby patients are unable to fight off normally non-pathogenic bacteria. Babior and others showed that the very weapons that the body makes to protect itself against microbial invasion can also play an important role in a variety of common diseases, including arthritis, arteriosclerosis, and Alzheimer's disease.

Babior received numerous honors, including membership of the American Society for Clinical Investigation. He was also a Fellow of the American Association for the Advancement of Science. In 1999 he was elected to membership in the National Academy of Sciences, one of the very few physicians practicing medicine to achieve this honor. The same year, he was elected a Fellow of the American Academy of Arts and Sciences.

He served on the editorial boards of a number of academic journals, including the Journal of Clinical Investigation, Blood and the Journal of Biological Chemistry. He published more than 250 scientific papers and wrote or edited four books.

Babior was married to Shirley; the couple had two children, Gregory and Jill. He died in San Diego, from prostate cancer, at the age of sixty-eight.
