= Chronic granulomatous disease =

Hereditary disease group

- Other names: Bridges–Good syndrome, chronic granulomatous disorder, Quie syndrome
- Superoxide
- Specialty: Immunology

Chronic granulomatous disease (CGD), also known as Bridges–Good syndrome, chronic granulomatous disorder, and Quie syndrome, is a diverse group of hereditary diseases in which certain cells of the immune system have difficulty forming the reactive oxygen compounds (most importantly the superoxide radical due to defective phagocyte NADPH oxidase) used to kill certain ingested pathogens. This leads to the formation of granulomas in many organs. CGD affects about 1 in 200,000 people in the United States, with about 20 new cases diagnosed each year.

This condition was first discovered in 1950 in a series of four boys from Minnesota, and in 1957 it was named "a fatal granulomatosus of childhood" in a publication describing their disease. The underlying cellular mechanism that causes chronic granulomatous disease was discovered in 1967, and research since that time has further elucidated the molecular mechanisms underlying the disease. Bernard Babior made key contributions in linking the defect of superoxide production of white blood cells, to the cause of the disease. In 1986, the X-linked form of CGD was the first disease for which positional cloning was used to identify the underlying genetic mutation.

== Symptoms and signs ==
Classically, patients with chronic granulomatous disease will have recurrent bouts of infection due to the decreased capacity of their immune system to fight off disease-causing organisms. The recurrent infections they acquire are specific and are, in decreasing order of frequency:

- pneumonia
- abscesses of the skin, tissues, and organs
- septic arthritis
- osteomyelitis
- bacteremia/fungemia
- superficial skin infections such as cellulitis or impetigo

Most people with CGD are diagnosed in childhood, usually, before age 5. Early diagnosis is important since these people can be placed on antibiotics to ward off infections before they occur. Small groups of CGD patients may also be affected by McLeod syndrome because of the proximity of the two genes on the same X-chromosome.

=== Atypical infections ===
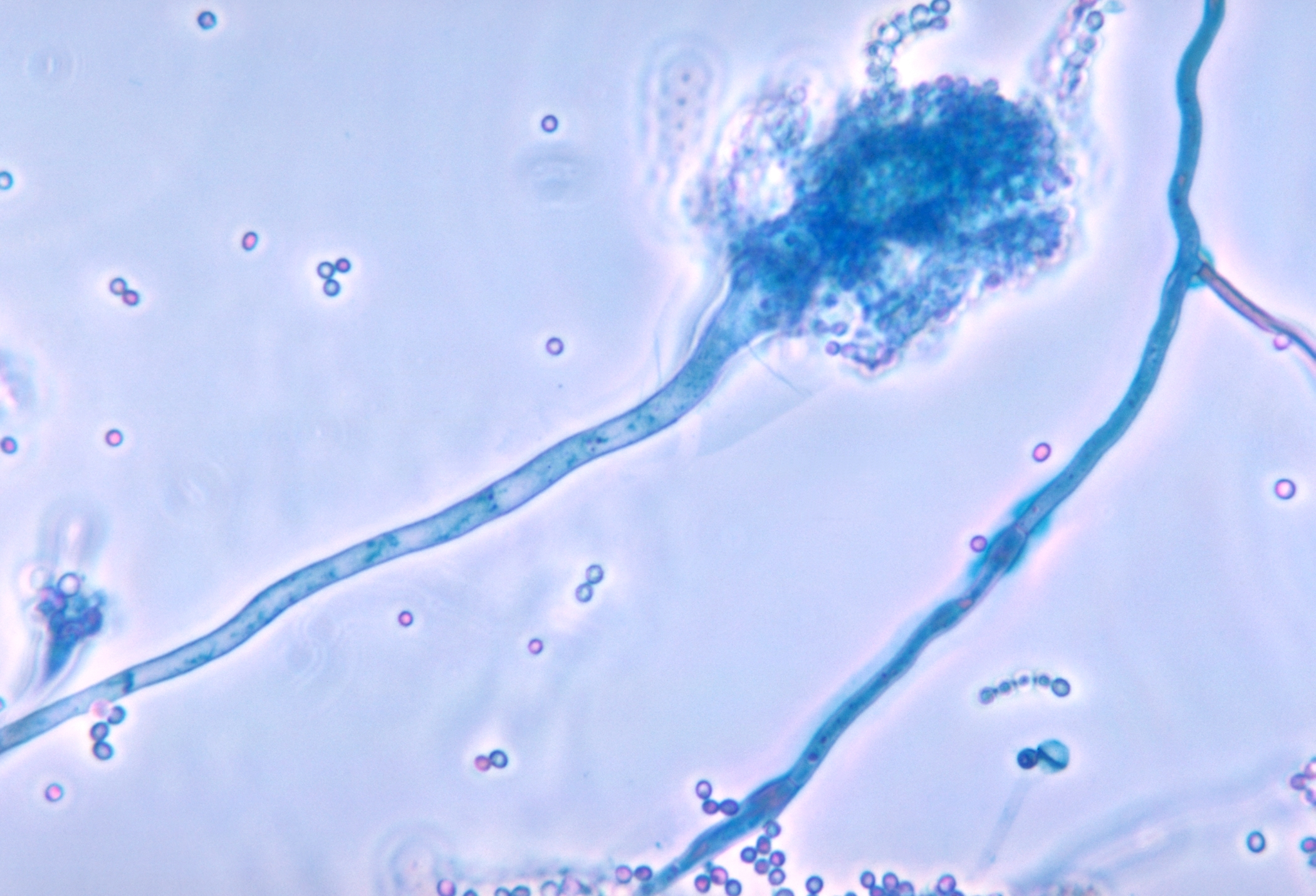
Microscopic image of the fungus Aspergillus fumigatus, an organism that commonly causes disease in people with chronic granulomatous disease.

People with CGD are sometimes infected with organisms that usually do not cause disease in people with normal immune systems. Among the most common organisms that cause disease in CGD patients are:

- Bacteria (particularly those that are catalase-positive)
  - Staphylococcus aureus.
  - Serratia marcescens.
  - Listeria species.
  - E. coli.
  - Klebsiella species.
  - Pseudomonas cepacia, a.k.a. Burkholderia cepacia.
  - Nocardia.
- Fungi
  - Aspergillus species. Aspergillus has a propensity to cause infection in people with CGD and of the Aspergillus species, Aspergillus fumigatus seems to be most common in CGD.
  - Candida species.

Patients with CGD can usually resist infections of catalase-negative bacteria but are susceptible to catalase-positive bacteria. Catalase is an enzyme that catalyzes the breakdown of hydrogen peroxide in many organisms. In infections caused by organisms that lack catalase (catalase-negative), the host with CGD is successfully able to "borrow" hydrogen peroxide being made by the organism and use it to fight off the infection. In infections by organisms that have catalase (catalase-positive), this "borrowing mechanism" is unsuccessful because the enzyme catalase first breaks down any hydrogen peroxide that would be borrowed from the organism. Therefore in the CGD patient, hydrogen peroxide cannot be used to make oxygen radicals to fight infection, leaving the patient vulnerable to infection by catalase-positive bacteria.

== Genetics ==
Most cases of chronic granulomatous disease are transmitted as a mutation on the X chromosome and are thus called an "X-linked trait". The affected gene on the X chromosome codes for the gp91 protein p91-PHOX (91 is the weight of the protein in kDa; the gp means glycoprotein). CGD can also be transmitted in an autosomal recessive fashion (via CYBA, NCF1, NCF2 and NCF4) which affect other PHOX proteins. The type of mutation that causes both types of CGD are varied and may be deletions, frame-shift, nonsense, and missense.

A low level of NADPH, the cofactor required for superoxide synthesis, can lead to CGD. This has been reported in women who are homozygous for the genetic defect causing glucose-6-phosphate dehydrogenase deficiency (G6PD), which is characterised by reduced NADPH levels.

== Pathophysiology ==
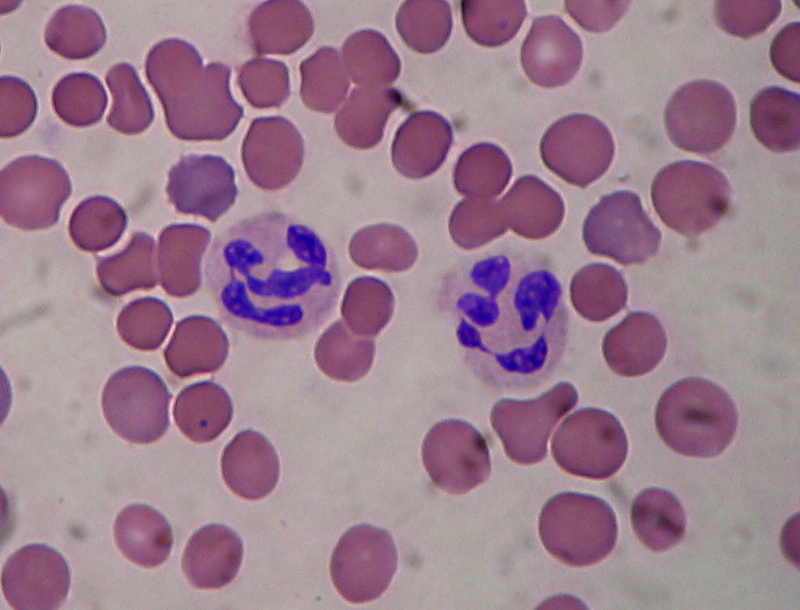
Two neutrophils among many red blood cells. Neutrophils are one type of cell affected by chronic granulomatous disease.

Phagocytes (i.e. neutrophils and macrophages) require an enzyme to produce reactive oxygen species to destroy bacteria after they are ingested (phagocytosis), a process known as the respiratory burst. This enzyme is termed "phagocyte NADPH oxidase" (PHOX). This enzyme oxidizes NADPH and reduces molecular oxygen to produce superoxide anions, a reactive oxygen species. Superoxide is then disproportionated into peroxide and molecular oxygen by superoxide dismutase. Finally, peroxide is used by myeloperoxidase to oxidize chloride ions into hypochlorite (the active component of bleach), which is toxic to bacteria. Thus, NADPH oxidase is critical for phagocyte killing of bacteria through reactive oxygen species.

(Two other mechanisms are used by phagocytes to kill bacteria: nitric oxide and proteases, but the loss of ROS-mediated killing alone is sufficient to cause chronic granulomatous disease.)

Defects in one of the four essential subunits of phagocyte NADPH oxidase (PHOX) can all cause CGD of varying severity, dependent on the defect. There are over 410 known possible defects in the PHOX enzyme complex that can lead to chronic granulomatous disease.

== Diagnosis ==
When chronic granulomatous disease (CGD) is suspected, neutrophil-function testing should be carried out, and positive findings should be confirmed by genotyping. The p47phox mutation is due to a pseudogene conversion, hence it may not be detectable by standard sequencing; in these cases, an immunoblot or gene dose determination may be needed to confirm p47phox deficiency.

Infections caused by the pathogens commonly associated with CGD should prompt functional or genetic screening; neonatal or early postnatal screening of potentially affected children is essential with a family history of CGD.

Neutrophil function tests: These include nitroblue tetrazolium (NBT) reduction test, dihydrorhodamine (DHR) 123 test, direct measurement of superoxide production, cytochrome c reduction assay, and chemiluminescence. DHR test is usually preferred because it is easy to use, objective, and it is able to distinguish between X-linked and autosomal forms of CGD; furthermore, it allows to detect gp91phox carriers.

- The nitroblue-tetrazolium (NBT) test is the original and most widely known test for chronic granulomatous disease. It is negative in CGD, meaning that it does not turn blue. The higher the blue score, the better the cell is at producing reactive oxygen species. This test depends upon the direct reduction of NBT to the insoluble blue compound formazan by superoxide which is produced by normal peripheral blood neutrophils stimulated in vitro; NADPH oxidase catalyzes the aforementioned reaction and NADPH is oxidized in the same reaction. This test is simple to perform and gives rapid results but only tells whether or not there is a problem with the PHOX enzymes, not how much they are affected.
- Dihydrorhodamine (DHR) 123 test: In this test the respiratory burst of the neutrophils is stimulated with phorbol myristate acetate (PMA), resulting in oxidation of dihydrorhodamine 123 (nonfluorescent derivative of rhodamine) to rhodamine 123 (green fluorescent compound), which can be measured by flow cytometry. This test is abnormal in patients with chronic granulomatous disease (i.e., there is no shift in fluorescence with stimulation). Moreover, its quantitative nature allows to differentiate oxidase-positive from oxidase-negative phagocyte subpopulations in CGD carriers and identify deficiencies in gp91phox and p47phox. Modest residual production of reactive oxygen intermediates (ROI) as assessed by DHR 123 test, is associated with significantly less severe illness and a greater likelihood of long-term survival than patients with little residual ROI production. On the other hand, in the case of complete myeloperoxidase deficiency, DHR test gives abnormal results (false positive for CGD) because the DHR signal yielded by flow cytometry depends on intact NADPH oxidase activity as well as the presence of a myeloperoxidase (MPO); however, NBT test demonstrates normal production of superoxide.

Genetic testing: Once CGD has been diagnosed based on abnormal neutrophil function tests, genetic testing should go next. As mentioned above, p47phox defect is usually difficult to identify genetically because it is caused by pseudogene conversion and may be missed in typical sequencing studies; in this case, immunoblotting or flow cytometry can show absence of protein.

Prenatal testing: It is particularly useful when a family member has already been diagnosed with CGD. This test may be performed by analysis of NADPH oxidase activity of neutrophils from fetal blood. Samples from amniotic fluid or chorionic villi provides an earlier and more reliable diagnosis for families at risk.

=== Classification ===
Chronic granulomatous disease is the name for a genetically heterogeneous group of immunodeficiencies. The core defect is a failure of phagocytic cells to kill organisms that they have engulfed because of defects in a system of enzymes that produce free radicals and other toxic small molecules. There are several types, including:

- X-linked chronic granulomatous disease (CGD)
- autosomal recessive cytochrome b-negative CGD
- autosomal recessive cytochrome b-positive CGD type I
- autosomal recessive cytochrome b-positive CGD type II
- atypical granulomatous disease

== Treatment ==
Management of chronic granulomatous disease revolves around two goals: 1) diagnose the disease early so that antibiotic prophylaxis can be given to keep an infection from occurring, and 2) educate the patient about his or her condition so that prompt treatment can be given if an infection occurs.

=== Antibiotics ===
Physicians often prescribe the antibiotic trimethoprim-sulfamethoxazole to prevent bacterial infections. This drug also has the benefit of sparing the normal bacteria of the digestive tract. Fungal infection is commonly prevented with itraconazole, although a newer drug of the same type called voriconazole may be more effective. The use of this drug for this purpose is still under scientific investigation.

=== Immunomodulation ===
Interferon, in the form of interferon gamma-1b (Actimmune) is approved by the Food and Drug Administration for the prevention of infection in CGD. It has been shown to reduce infections in CGD patients by 70% and to decrease their severity. Although its exact mechanism is still not entirely understood, it has the ability to give CGD patients more immune function and therefore, greater ability to fight off infections. This therapy has been the standard treatment for CGD for several years.

=== Hematopoietic stem cell transplantation (HSCT) ===
Hematopoietic stem cell transplantation from a matched donor is curative although not without significant risk.

== Prognosis ==
There are currently no studies detailing the long term outcome of chronic granulomatous disease with modern treatment. Without treatment, children often die in the first decade of life. The increased severity of X-linked CGD results in a decreased survival rate of patients, as 20% of X-linked patients die of CGD-related causes by the age of 10, whereas 20% of autosomal recessive patients die by the age of 35.
Recent experience from centers specializing in the care of patients with CGD suggests that the current mortality has fallen to under 3% and 1% respectively. CGD was initially termed "fatal granulomatous disease of childhood" because patients rarely survived past their first decade in the time before routine use of prophylactic antimicrobial agents. The average patient now survives at least 40 years.

== Epidemiology ==
CGD affects about 1 in 200,000 people in the United States, with about 20 new cases diagnosed each year.

Chronic granulomatous disease affects all people of all races; however, there is limited information on prevalence outside of the United States. One survey in Sweden reported an incidence of 1 in 220,000 people, while a larger review of studies in Europe suggested a lower rate: 1 in 250,000 people.

== History ==
This condition was first described in 1954 by Janeway, who reported five cases of the disease in children. In 1957 it was further characterized as "a fatal granulomatosus of childhood". The underlying cellular mechanism that causes chronic granulomatous disease was discovered in 1967, and research since that time has further elucidated the molecular mechanisms underlying the disease. Use of antibiotic prophylaxis, surgical abscess drainage, and vaccination led to the term "fatal" being dropped from the name of the disease as children survived into adulthood.

== Research ==
Gene therapy is currently being studied as a possible treatment for chronic granulomatous disease. CGD is well-suited for gene therapy since it is caused by a mutation in single gene which only affects one body system (the hematopoietic system). Viruses have been used to deliver a normal gp91 gene to rats with a mutation in this gene, and subsequently the phagocytes in these rats were able to produce oxygen radicals.

In 2006, two human patients with X-linked chronic granulomatous disease underwent gene therapy and blood cell precursor stem cell transplantation to their bone marrow. Both patients recovered from their CGD, clearing pre-existing infections and demonstrating increased oxidase activity in their neutrophils. However, long-term complications and efficacy of this therapy were unknown.

In 2012, a 16-year-old boy with CGD was treated at the Great Ormond Street Hospital, London with an experimental gene therapy that temporarily reversed the CGD and allowed him to overcome a life-threatening lung disease.

In 2024, Prime Medicine began a Phase 1/2 open-label clinical trial to evaluate PM359, an investigational gene therapy, in patients with CGD caused by NCF1 mutations. The treatment involves transplantation of autologous CD34+ stem cells modified by prime editing ex vivo. Following an announcement of preliminary results in May 2025, Prime Medicine and its clinical collaborators reported in December 2025 that two CGD patients treated with PM359 had been "effectively cured" of the disease. In 2026, a Canadian man was identified as being the first patient to be cured of the disease with this treatment.
