= L-gulonolactone oxidase =

Enzyme involved in the synthesis of vitamin C

GULOP

Identifiers
- Aliases: GULOP, GULO, SCURVY, gulonolactone (L-) oxidase, pseudogene
- External IDs: MGI: 1353434; GeneCards: GULOP

Gene location (Mouse)
Chr.	Chromosome 14 (mouse)
Band	14|14 D1	Start	66,224,235 bp
Band	14|14 D1	End	66,246,656 bp
Orthologs
Databases	NCBI: entry; OMA: entry
Species	Human	Mouse
Entrez	2989	268756
Ensembl	ENSG00000234770	ENSMUSG00000034450
UniProt	n a	P58710
RefSeq (mRNA)	n/a	NM_178747
RefSeq (protein)	n/a	NP_848862
Location (UCSC)	n/a	Chr 14: 66.22 – 66.25 Mb
PubMed search
- Wikidata
View/Edit Human	View/Edit Mouse

L-gulonolactone oxidase

Identifiers
- EC no.: 1.1.3.8
- CAS no.: 9028-78-8

Databases
- BRENDA: enzyme data
- ExPASy: NiceZyme view
- KEGG: enzyme entry
- MetaCyc: metabolic pathway
- Rhea: reactions
- PDB structures: RCSB PDB PDBe PDBsum
- Gene Ontology: AmiGO / QuickGO
Search
- PMC: articles
- PubMed: articles
- NCBI: proteins

L-Gulonolactone oxidase (EC 1.1.3.8) is an enzyme that produces vitamin C. It is expressed in most mammals, but is not produced in Haplorhini (a suborder of primates, including humans), in guinea pigs, and in some bat species.

It catalyzes the reaction of L-gulono-1,4-lactone with oxygen to form L-xylo-hex-3-gulonolactone (2-keto-gulono-γ-lactone) and hydrogen peroxide. It uses FAD as a cofactor. The L-xylo-hex-3-gulonolactone then converts to ascorbic acid spontaneously, without enzymatic action. The structure of L-gulonolactone oxidase in rats helps identify characteristics of this enzyme.

L-gulono-1,4-lactone
O_{2}
H_{2}O_{2}
O_{2}
H_{2}O_{2}
Vitamin C

== Gulonolactone oxidase deficiency ==
The non-functional gulonolactone oxidase pseudogene (GULOP) was mapped to human chromosome 8p21, which corresponds to an evolutionarily conserved segment on either porcine chromosome 4 (SSC4) or 14 (SSC14). GULO produces both hydrogen peroxide and the gulonolactone precursor to ascorbic acid, which spontaneously converts to the vitamin itself.

The loss of activity of the gene encoding L-gulonolactone oxidase (GULO) has occurred separately in the history of several species. GULO activity has been lost in some species of bats, but others retain it. The loss of this enzyme activity is responsible for the inability of guinea pigs to enzymatically synthesize vitamin C. Both these events happened independently of the loss in the haplorhine suborder of primates, which includes humans.

A non-functional remnant of this gene with many mutations is still present in the genomes of humans and guinea pigs. It is not known whether remains of the gene exist in the bats that lack GULO activity. The function of GULO appears to have been lost several times, and possibly re-acquired, in several lines of passerine birds, where ability to make vitamin C varies from species to species.

Loss of GULO activity in the primate order occurred about 63 million years ago, at about the time it split into the suborders Haplorhini (which lost the enzyme activity) and Strepsirrhini (which retained it). The haplorhine ("simple-nosed") primates, which cannot make vitamin C enzymatically, include the tarsiers and the simians (apes, monkeys, and humans). The strepsirrhine ("bent-nosed" or "wet-nosed") primates, which can still make vitamin C enzymatically, include lorises, galagos, pottos, and, to some extent, lemurs.

L-Gulonolactone oxidase deficiency has been called "hypoascorbemia" and is described by OMIM (Online Mendelian Inheritance in Man) as "a public inborn error of metabolism", as it affects all humans. There exists a wide discrepancy between the amounts of ascorbic acid other primates consume and what are recommended as "reference intakes" for humans. In its patently pathological form, the effects of ascorbate deficiency are manifested as scurvy.

== Consequences of loss ==
It is likely that some level of adaptation occurred after the loss of the GULO gene by primates. Erythrocyte Glut1 and associated dehydroascorbic acid uptake modulated by stomatin switch are unique traits of humans and the few other mammals that have lost the ability to synthesize ascorbic acid from glucose. As GLUT transporters and stomatin are ubiquitously distributed in different human cell types and tissues, similar interactions may occur in human cells other than erythrocytes.

Linus Pauling observed that after the loss of endogenous ascorbate production, apo(a) and Lp(a) were greatly favored by evolution, acting as ascorbate surrogate, since the frequency of occurrence of elevated Lp(a) plasma levels in species that had lost the ability to synthesize ascorbate is great. Also, only primates share regulation of the CAMP gene expression by vitamin D, which occurred after the loss of GULO gene.

Johnson et al. have hypothesized that the mutation of the GULOP pseudogene that stopped it from producing GULO may have benefited early primates by increasing uric acid levels and enhancing fructose effects on weight gain and fat accumulation. During reduced food availability, this gave mutants a survival advantage.

== Animal models ==
Studies of human diseases have benefited from the availability of small laboratory animal models. However, the tissues of animal models with a GULO gene generally have high levels of ascorbic acid and so are often only slightly influenced by exogenous vitamin C. This is a major handicap for studies involving the endogenous redox systems of primates and other animals that lack this gene.

Guinea pigs are a popular human model. They lost the ability to make GULO 20 million years ago.

In 1999, Maeda et al. genetically engineered mice with an inactivated GULO gene. The mutant mice, like humans, entirely depend on dietary vitamin C, and they show changes indicating that the integrity of their vasculature is compromised. GULO^{–/–} mice have been used as a human model in multiple subsequent studies.

There have been successful attempts to re-activate lost enzymatic function in different animal species. Various GULO mutants were also identified.

== Plant models ==
In plants, the importance of vitamin C in regulating whole-plant morphology, cell structure, and plant development has been clearly established via characterization of low-vitamin C mutants of Arabidopsis thaliana, potato, tobacco, tomato, and rice. Elevating vitamin C content by overexpressing inositol oxygenase and gulono-1,4-lactone oxidase in A. thaliana leads to enhanced biomass and tolerance to abiotic stresses.

== L-gulonolactone oxidase in rats ==
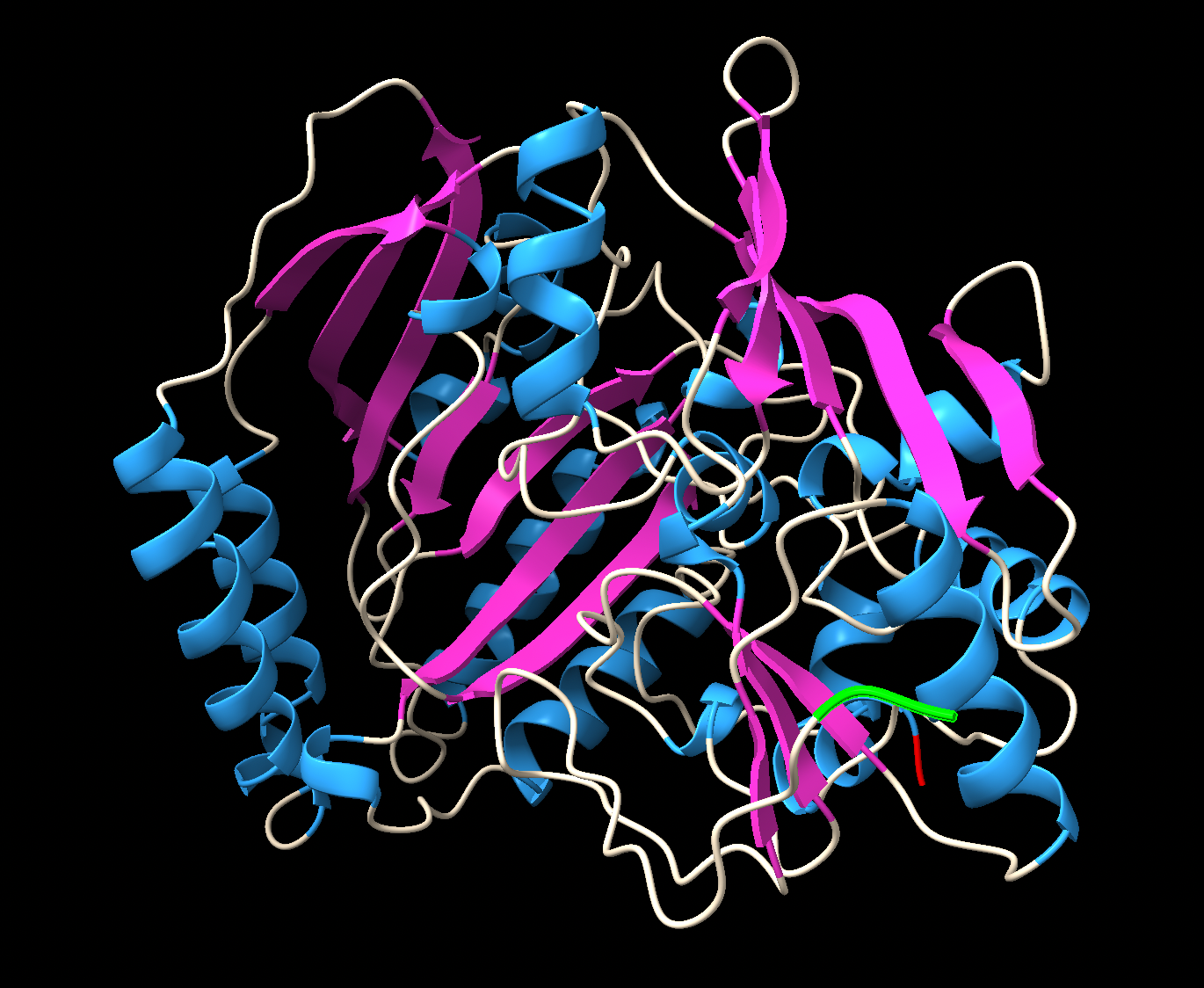
L-gulonolactone oxidase protein of a rat. The magenta color shows the B-sheets that are present in the protein. The blue color represents the alpha helices that make up the structure of L-gulonolactone oxidase. Lime green is showing the N-terminus. Red is displaying the C-terminus end of the protein.

L-gulonolactone oxidase (GULO) is an enzyme that helps catalyze the production of ascorbic acid aka vitamin C. Mammals such as humans and guinea pigs do not express this gene due to multiple mutations in a specific exon. These mutations correlate to nucleotide substitution. Rats are a species that do express L-gulonolactone oxidase with a specific gene transcript. The protein coding region of the gene is 645 base-pairs long, with eight exons and seven introns. The amino acid sequence of this protein has suggested that rat L-Gulonolactone oxidase is located in the membrane portion of the endoplasmic reticulum due to its multiple B-sheet structure which contains hydrophobic areas. It has been determined that rat GULO has a prosthetic domain in the N-terminus, flavian adenine dinucleotide. The only substrates that can make this rat enzyme function are L-GalL and L-GulL.

== Alternative substrates and related enzymes ==
GULO belongs to a family of sugar-1,4-lactone oxidases, which also includes the yeast enzyme D-arabinono-1,4-lactone oxidase (ALO). ALO produces erythorbic acid when acting on its canonical substrate. This family is in turn a subfamily under more sugar-1,4-lactone oxidases, which also includes the bacterial L-gulono-1,4-lactone dehydrogenase and the plant galactonolactone dehydrogenase. All these aldonolactone oxidoreductases play a role in some form of vitamin C synthesis, and some (including GULO and ALO) accept substrates of other members.

== See also ==
- Vitamin C (ascorbic acid)
- Oxidoreductase
- Scurvy
