= Lists of human genes =

Lists of human genes are as follows:

== By chromosome ==
Human chromosomes, each of which contains an incomplete list of genes located on that chromosome, are as follows:

- Chromosome 1
- Chromosome 2
- Chromosome 3
- Chromosome 4
- Chromosome 5
- Chromosome 6
- Chromosome 7
- Chromosome 8
- Chromosome 9
- Chromosome 10
- Chromosome 11
- Chromosome 12
- Chromosome 13
- Chromosome 14
- Chromosome 15
- Chromosome 16
- Chromosome 17
- Chromosome 18
- Chromosome 19
- Chromosome 20
- Chromosome 21
- Chromosome 22
- X Chromosome
- Y Chromosome

== Protein-coding genes ==
The lists below constitute a complete list of all known human protein-coding genes:

== Transcription factors ==
1639 genes which encode proteins that are known or expected to function as human transcription factors:

- List of human transcription factors

== See also ==
- List of enzymes
- List of proteins
- List of disabled human pseudogenes
