= Galactonolactone dehydrogenase =

L-galactonolactone dehydrogenase

Identifiers
- EC no.: 1.3.2.3
- CAS no.: 2603847

Databases
- IntEnz: IntEnz view
- BRENDA: BRENDA entry
- ExPASy: NiceZyme view
- KEGG: KEGG entry
- MetaCyc: metabolic pathway
- PRIAM: profile
- PDB structures: RCSB PDB PDBe PDBsum
Search
- PMC: articles
- PubMed: articles
- NCBI: proteins

L-galactonolactone dehydrogenase (EC 1.3.2.3, galactonolactone dehydrogenase, L-galactono-gamma-lactone dehydrogenase, L-galactono-gamma-lactone:ferricytochrome-c oxidoreductase, GLDHase, GLDase) is an enzyme with systematic name L-galactono-1,4-lactone:ferricytochrome-c oxidoreductase. This enzyme catalyses two chemical reactions

L-galactono-1,4-lactone
+ 2 ferricytochrome c
2 H^{+}
2 H^{+}
vitamin C
2 ferrocytochrome c
vitamin C
+ 2 ferricytochrome c
2 H^{+}
2 H^{+}
dehydroascorbic acid
2 ferrocytochrome c

The first stage is the final step in the biosynthesis of vitamin C in plants and other photosynthetic eukaryotes.
