= D-arabinono-1,4-lactone oxidase =

Class of enzymes

Identifiers
- EC no.: 1.1.3.37
- CAS no.: 182372-12-9

Databases
- BRENDA: enzyme data
- ExPASy: NiceZyme view
- KEGG: enzyme entry
- MetaCyc: metabolic pathway
- Rhea: reactions
- PDB structures: RCSB PDB PDBe PDBsum
- Gene Ontology: AmiGO / QuickGO
Search
- PMC: articles
- PubMed: articles
- NCBI: proteins

In enzymology, D-arabinono-1,4-lactone oxidase (EC 1.1.3.37) is an enzyme that catalyzes the chemical reaction

D-arabinono-1,4-lactone
O_{2}
H_{2}O_{2}
O_{2}
H_{2}O_{2}
D-erythro-ascorbic acid

The two substrates of this enzyme are D-arabinono-1,4-lactone and oxygen. Its products are D-erythro-ascorbic acid and hydrogen peroxide.

This enzyme belongs to the family of oxidoreductases, specifically those acting on the CH-OH group of donor with oxygen as acceptor. The systematic name of this enzyme class is D-arabinono-1,4-lactone:oxygen oxidoreductase. It employs one cofactor, FAD.
