= Neutrophil cytosolic factor 4 =

Protein-coding gene in the species Homo sapiens

NCF4
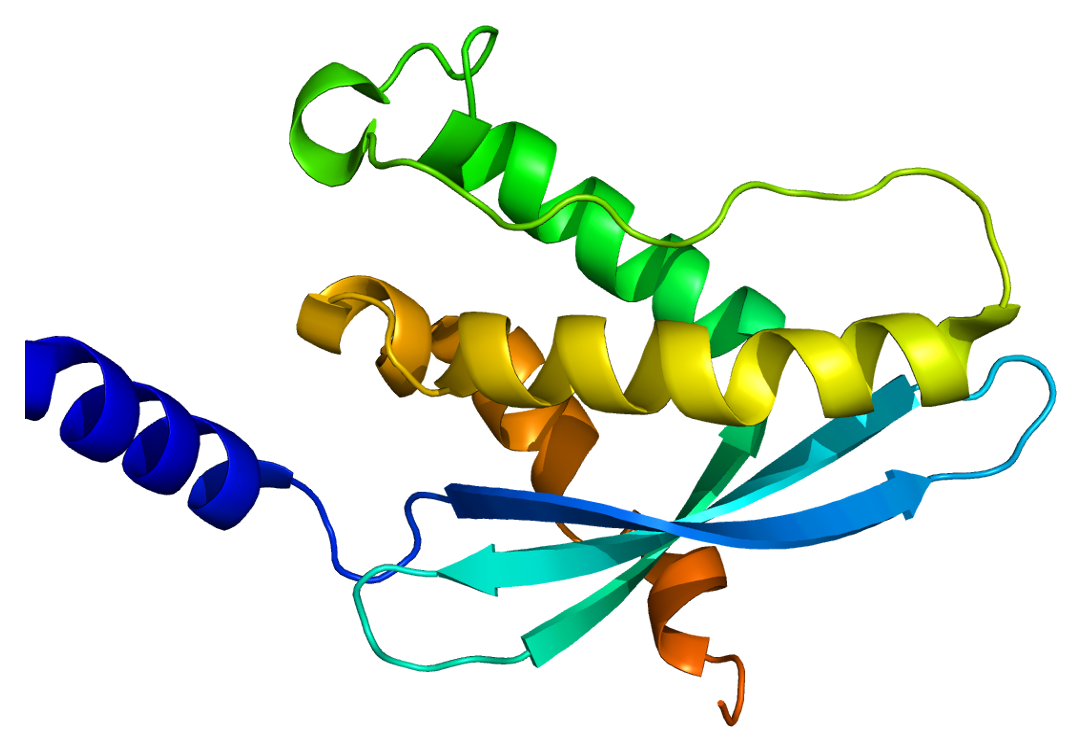

Identifiers
- Aliases: NCF4, NCF, P40PHOX, SH3PXD4, Neutrophil cytosolic factor 4, CGD3
- External IDs: OMIM: 601488; MGI: 109186; GeneCards: NCF4
Available structures
PDB	Ortholog search: PDBe RCSB
PDB	List of PDB id codes 1H6H, 1OEY, 1W6X, 1W70, 1Z9Q, 2DYB

Gene location (Human)
Chr.	Chromosome 22 (human)
Band	22q12.3	Start	36,860,988 bp
Band	22q12.3	End	36,878,017 bp

Gene location (Mouse)
Chr.	Chromosome 15 (mouse)
Band	15 E1|15 37.1 cM	Start	78,129,001 bp
Band	15 E1|15 37.1 cM	End	78,146,780 bp
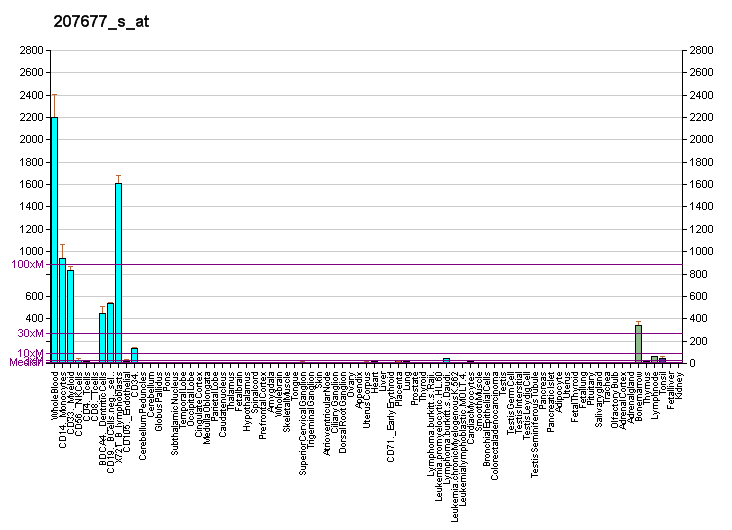

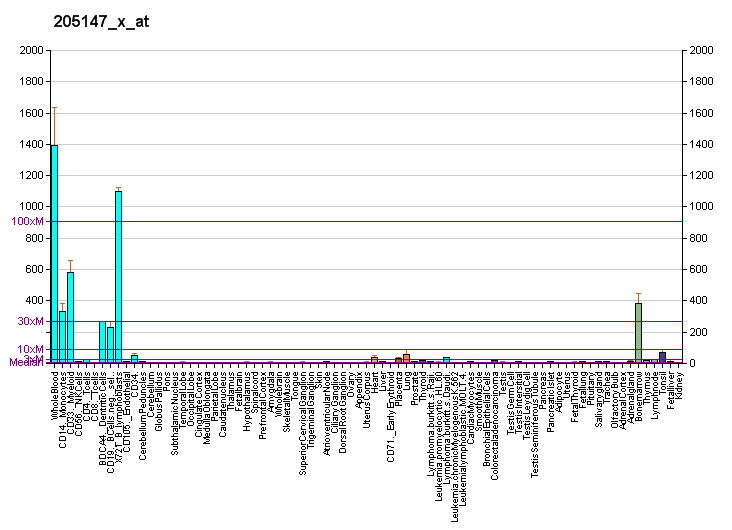
RNA expression pattern
Bgee	Human / Mouse (ortholog); Top expressed in: blood; spleen; granulocyte; bone marrow; monocyte; bone marrow cell; appendix; lymph node; synovial membrane; placenta / Top expressed in: granulocyte; blood; tibiofemoral joint; spleen; mesenteric lymph nodes; bone marrow; fetal liver hematopoietic progenitor cell; stroma of bone marrow; embryo; internal carotid artery; More reference expression data
BioGPS	More reference expression data
Gene ontology
Molecular function	protein dimerization activity; phosphatidylinositol-3-phosphate binding; protein binding; phosphatidylinositol binding; lipid binding; superoxide-generating NADPH oxidase activator activity
Cellular component	cytoplasm; cytosol; endosome; membrane; phagolysosome; endosome membrane; trans-Golgi network; NADPH oxidase complex
Biological process	vascular endothelial growth factor receptor signaling pathway; immune response; positive regulation of catalytic activity; vesicle-mediated transport; phagocytosis; respiratory burst; superoxide metabolic process; antigen processing and presentation of exogenous peptide antigen via MHC class I, TAP-dependent; cellular response to oxidative stress; cell redox homeostasis
Sources:Amigo / QuickGO
Orthologs
Databases	NCBI: entry; OMA: entry
Species	Human	Mouse
Entrez	4689	17972
Ensembl	ENSG00000275990; ENSG00000100365	ENSMUSG00000071715
UniProt	Q15080	P97369
RefSeq (mRNA)	NM_000631; NM_013416	NM_008677
RefSeq (protein)	NP_000622; NP_038202	NP_032703
Location (UCSC)	Chr 22: 36.86 – 36.88 Mb	Chr 15: 78.13 – 78.15 Mb
PubMed search
- Wikidata
View/Edit Human	View/Edit Mouse

Neutrophil cytosol factor 4 is a protein that in humans is encoded by the NCF4 gene.

== Function ==
The protein encoded by this gene is a cytosolic regulatory component of the superoxide-producing phagocyte NADPH-oxidase, a multicomponent enzyme system important for host defense. This protein is preferentially expressed in cells of myeloid lineage. It interacts primarily with neutrophil cytosolic factor 2 (NCF2/p67-phox) to form a complex with neutrophil cytosolic factor 1 (NCF1/p47-phox), which further interacts with the small G protein RAC1 and translocates to the membrane upon cell stimulation. This complex then activates flavocytochrome b, the membrane-integrated catalytic core of the enzyme system. The PX domain of this protein can bind phospholipid products of the PI(3) kinase, which suggests its role in PI(3) kinase-mediated signaling events. The phosphorylation of this protein was found to negatively regulate the enzyme activity. Alternatively spliced transcript variants encoding distinct isoforms have been observed.

== Clinical significance ==
GWAS studies showed that Crohn's disease patient with certain SNPs in NCF4 are more susceptible to get Crohn's disease. Crohn's patient with rs4821544 variants showed a decreased reactive oxygen species after stimulation with GM-CSF which is a proinflammtory cytokine.

== Interactions ==
Neutrophil cytosolic factor 4 has been shown to interact with Ku70, Neutrophil cytosolic factor 1 and Moesin.
