= Neutrophil cytosolic factor 1 =

Protein-coding gene in the species Homo sapiens

NCF1
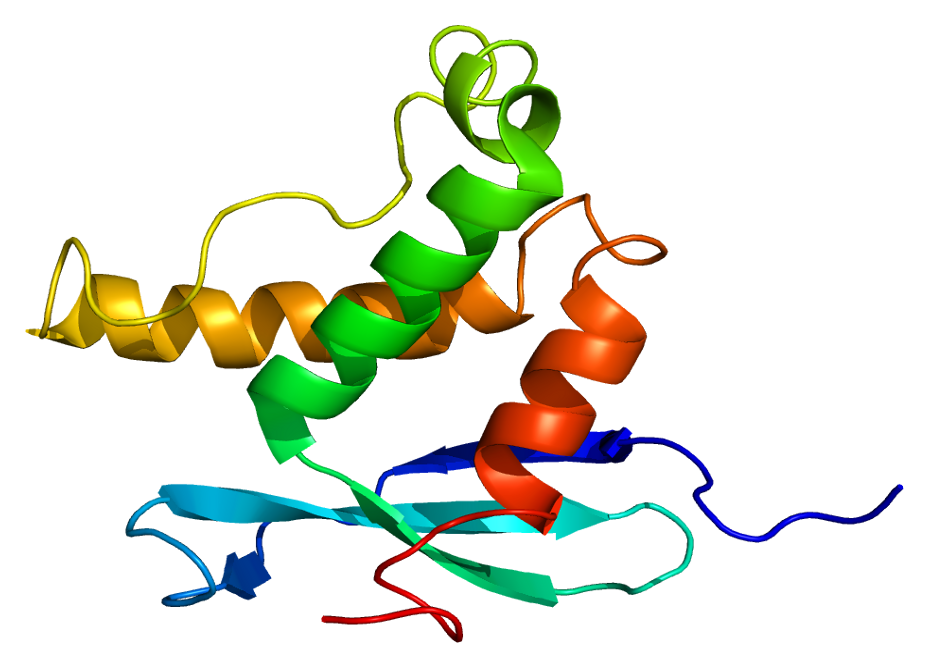

Identifiers
- Aliases: NCF1, NCF1A, NOXO2, SH3PXD1A, p47phox, Neutrophil cytosolic factor 1, CGD1
- External IDs: OMIM: 608512; MGI: 97283; GeneCards: NCF1
Available structures
PDB	Ortholog search: PDBe RCSB
PDB	List of PDB id codes 1GD5, 1K4U, 1KQ6, 1NG2, 1O7K, 1OV3, 1UEC, 1W70, 1WLP

Gene location (Human)
Chr.	Chromosome 7 (human)
Band	7q11.23	Start	74,774,011 bp
Band	7q11.23	End	74,789,315 bp

Gene location (Mouse)
Chr.	Chromosome 5 (mouse)
Band	5 G2|5 74.47 cM	Start	134,248,907 bp
Band	5 G2|5 74.47 cM	End	134,258,479 bp
RNA expression pattern
Bgee	Human / Mouse (ortholog); Top expressed in: granulocyte; blood; monocyte; bone marrow cell; spleen; appendix; lymph node; upper lobe of left lung; right lung; mucosa of transverse colon / Top expressed in: granulocyte; stroma of bone marrow; mesenteric lymph nodes; tibiofemoral joint; blood; spleen; calvaria; transitional epithelium of urinary bladder; left lung lobe; right lung lobe; More reference expression data
BioGPS	n/a
Gene ontology
Molecular function	superoxide-generating NAD(P)H oxidase activity; SH3 domain binding; phosphatidylinositol-3,4-bisphosphate binding; protein binding; phosphatidylinositol binding; electron transfer activity; lipid binding; superoxide-generating NADPH oxidase activator activity
Cellular component	cytoplasm; cytosol; membrane; phagolysosome; extrinsic component of membrane; dendrite; NADPH oxidase complex; Golgi apparatus; rough endoplasmic reticulum; soma; podosome; plasma membrane
Biological process	protein targeting to membrane; superoxide anion generation; cellular defense response; vascular endothelial growth factor receptor signaling pathway; innate immune response; superoxide metabolic process; apoptotic process; respiratory burst; podosome assembly; positive regulation of phosphatidylinositol 3-kinase signaling; cellular response to reactive oxygen species; positive regulation of epidermal growth factor-activated receptor activity; positive regulation of transcription, DNA-templated; positive regulation of JNK cascade; cellular response to cadmium ion; positive regulation of p38MAPK cascade; electron transport chain; antigen processing and presentation of exogenous peptide antigen via MHC class I, TAP-dependent; cellular response to oxidative stress; cell redox homeostasis
Sources:Amigo / QuickGO
Orthologs
Databases	NCBI: entry; OMA: entry
Species	Human	Mouse
Entrez	653361	17969
Ensembl	ENSG00000158517	ENSMUSG00000015950
UniProt	P14598	Q09014
RefSeq (mRNA)	NM_000265	NM_001286037; NM_010876
RefSeq (protein)	NP_000256	NP_001272966; NP_035006
Location (UCSC)	Chr 7: 74.77 – 74.79 Mb	Chr 5: 134.25 – 134.26 Mb
PubMed search
- Wikidata
View/Edit Human	View/Edit Mouse

Neutrophil cytosol factor 1, also known as p47phox, is a protein that in humans is encoded by the NCF1 gene.

== Function ==
The protein encoded by this gene is a 47 kDa cytosolic subunit of neutrophil NADPH oxidase. This oxidase is a multicomponent enzyme that is activated to produce superoxide anion. Mutations in this gene have been associated with chronic granulomatous disease.

Genetic variability in the NCF1 gene has been found to be related to a higher chance of getting autoimmune diseases such as Sjögren's syndrome, rheumatoid arthritis and lupus erythematosus.

== Interactions ==
Neutrophil cytosolic factor 1 has been shown to interact with:

- Moesin,
- Neutrophil cytosolic factor 4, and
- RELA.

== Therapies ==
A Phase 1/2 open-label clinical trial began in the U.S. in late 2024 to evaluate PM359, a gene therapy developed by Prime Medicine, in patients with chronic granulomatous disease caused by mutations in the NCF1 gene.
